= List of Clostridium species =

As of October 2022, there are 164 validly published species in Clostridium, as well as 38 species described but not validly published.

== Species ==
- Clostridium aceticum
- Clostridium acetireducens
- Clostridium acetobutylicum
- Clostridium acidisoli
- Clostridium aciditolerans
- Clostridium aestuarii
- Clostridium akagii
- Clostridium algidicarnis
- Clostridium algifaecis
- Clostridium algoriphilum
- Clostridium amazonense
- Clostridium aminophilum
- Clostridium ammoniilyticum
- Clostridium amylolyticum
- Clostridium aquiflavi
- Clostridium arbusti
- Clostridium arcticum
- Clostridium argentinense
- Clostridium aromativorans
- Clostridium aurantibutyricum
- "Clostridium autoethanogenum"
- Clostridium baratii
- Clostridium beihaiense
- Clostridium beijerinckii
  - Clostridium diolis
- Clostridium bornimense
- Clostridium botulinum
- Clostridium bovifaecis
- Clostridium bowmanii
- Clostridium budayi
- Clostridium butanoliproducens
- Clostridium butyricum
- Clostridium cadaveris
- Clostridium caldaquaticum
- Clostridium carboxidivorans
- Clostridium carnis
- Clostridium cavendishii
- Clostridium celatum
- "Clostridium cellulofermentans"
- Clostridium cellulosi
- Clostridium cellulovorans
- Clostridium chartatabidum
- Clostridium chauvoei
- Clostridium chromiireducens
- Clostridium chrysemydis
- Clostridium cochlearium
- Clostridium colicanis
- Clostridium colinum
- Clostridium collagenovorans
- Clostridium combesii
- Clostridium composti
- Clostridium cylindrosporum
- Clostridium disporicum
- Clostridium drakei
- Clostridium estertheticum
- Clostridium facile
- Clostridium fallax
- Clostridium felsineum
- Clostridium fermenticellae
- Clostridium fessum
- Clostridium fimetarium
- Clostridium folliculivorans
- Clostridium formicaceticum
- Clostridium frigidicarnis
- Clostridium frigoris
- Clostridium fungisolvens
- Clostridium ganghwense
- Clostridium gasigenes
- Clostridium gelidum
- Clostridium grantii
- Clostridium guangxiense
- Clostridium haemolyticum
- Clostridium herbivorans
- Clostridium homopropionicum
- Clostridium hominis
- Clostridium huakuii
- Clostridium hydrogeniformans
- Clostridium hylemonae
- Clostridium indicum
- Clostridium innocuum
- Clostridium intestinale
- Clostridium isatidis
- Clostridium jeddahense
- Clostridium kluyveri
- Clostridium kogasense
- Clostridium lacusfryxellense
- Clostridium lentum
- Clostridium leptum
- Clostridium liquoris
- Clostridium ljungdahlii
- Clostridium lundense
- Clostridium luticellarii
- Clostridium magnum
- Clostridium malenominatum
- Clostridium manihotivorum
- Clostridium methoxybenzovorans
- Clostridium methylpentosum
- Clostridium mobile
- Clostridium moniliforme
- Clostridium muellerianum
- Clostridium neonatale
- Clostridium neuense
- Clostridium nexile
- Clostridium nitritogenes
- Clostridium nitrophenolicum
- Clostridium novyi
- Clostridium oceanicum
- Clostridium omnivorum
- Clostridium oryzae
- Clostridium pabulibutyricum
- Clostridium paradoxum
- Clostridium paraputrificum
- Clostridium pascui
- Clostridium pasteurianum
- Clostridium peptidivorans
- Clostridium perfringens
- Clostridium phytofermentans
- Clostridium piliforme
- Clostridium polyendosporum
- Clostridium polynesiense
- Clostridium polysaccharolyticum
- Clostridium porci
- Clostridium prolinivorans
- Clostridium psychrophilum
- Clostridium punense
- Clostridium puniceum
- Clostridium putrefaciens
- Clostridium putrificum
- Clostridium quinii
- "Clostridium ragsdalei"
- Clostridium saccharobutylicum
- Clostridium saccharoperbutylacetonicum
- Clostridium sardiniense
- Clostridium sartagoforme
- Clostridium saudiense
- Clostridium scatologenes
- Clostridium schirmacherense
- Clostridium scindens
- Clostridium senegalense
- Clostridium septicum
- Clostridium simiarum
- Clostridium sporogenes
- Clostridium sporosphaeroides
- Clostridium subterminale
- Clostridium sulfidigenes
- Clostridium swellfunianum
- Clostridium symbiosum
- Clostridium tagluense
- Clostridium tanneri
- Clostridium tarantellae
- Clostridium tepidiprofundi
- Clostridium tepidum
- Clostridium tertium
- Clostridium tetani
- Clostridium tetanomorphum
- Clostridium thailandense
- Clostridium thermarum
- Clostridium thermoalcaliphilum
- Clostridium thermobutyricum
- Clostridium thermopalmarium
- Clostridium thermopapyrolyticum
- Clostridium thermosuccinogenes
- Clostridium thiosulfatireducens
- Clostridium tyrobutyricum
- Clostridium uliginosum
- Clostridium vincentii
- Clostridium viride
- Clostridium vitabionis
- Clostridium vulturis
- Clostridium weizhouense
- Clostridium zeae

== Species formerly placed in Clostridium ==
- Order Caryophanales
  - Family Paenibacillaceae
    - Genus Oxalophagus: Clostridium oxalicum, reassigned in 1994.
    - Genus Paenibacillus: Clostridium durum, reassigned in 1994.
- Order Erysipelotrichia
  - Family Coprobacillaceae
    - Genus Thomasclavelia: Clostridium cocleatum, C. ramosum, C. saccharogumia and C. spiroforme, reassigned in 2023.
- Order Eubacteriales
  - Family Clostridiaceae
    - Genus Asaccharospora: Clostridium irregulare, reassigned in 2014.
    - Genus Caloramator: Clostridium fervidum, reassigned in 1994.
    - Genus Hathewaya: Clostridium histolyticum, C. limosum and C. proteolyticum, reassigned in 2016.
    - Genus Hungatella: Clostridium hathewayi, reassigned in 2014.
    - Genus Intestinibacter: Clostridium bartlettii, reassigned in 2014.
    - Genus Oxobacter: Clostridium pfennigii, reassigned in 1994.
    - Genus Romboutsia: Clostridium lituseburense, reassigned in 2014.
    - Genus Sarcina: Clostridium maximum and C. ventriculi. Originally described in Sarcina, proposed to be moved to Clostridium in 2016 but remained due to Sarcina being the older genus.
    - Genus Terrisporobacter: Clostridium glycolicum and C. mayombei, reassigned in 2014.
  - Family Eubacteriaceae
    - Genus Eubacterium: Clostridium barkeri, reassigned in 1994.
  - Family Lachnospiraceae
    - Genus Anaerocolumna: Clostridium aminovalericum, C. jejuense and C. xylanovorans, reassigned in 2016.
    - Genus Anaeromicropila: Clostridium populeti, reassigned in 2023.
    - Genus Anaerotignum: Clostridium lactatifermentans, C. neopropionicum and C. propionicum, reassigned in 2017
    - Genus Blautia: Clostridium coccoides, reassigned in 2008.
    - Genus Butyrivibrio: Clostridium proteoclasticum, reassigned in 2008.
    - Genus Cellulosilyticum: C. lentocellum, reassigned in 2010.
    - Genus Enterocloster: Clostridium aldenense, C. asparagiforme, C. bolteae, C. citroniae, C. clostridioforme and C. lavalense, reassigned in 2020.
    - Genus Faecalicatena: Clostridium oroticum, reassigned in 2017.
    - Genus Lacrimispora: Clostridium aerotolerans, C. algidixylanolyticum, C. amygdalinum, C. celerecrescens, C. indolis, C. saccharolyticum, C. sphenoides, C. xylanolyticum
    - Genus Mediterraneibacter: Clostridium glycyrrhizinilyticum, reassigned in 2019
  - Family Oscillospiraceae
    - Genus Acetivibrio: Clostridium aldrichii, C. alkalicellulosi, C. clariflavum, C. straminisolvens and C. thermocellum, reassigned in 2019.
    - Genus Flavonifractor: Clostridium orbiscindens, merged with Eubacterium plautii and moved to new genus in 2010.
    - Genus Ruminiclostridium: Clostridium cellobioparum, Clostridium cellulolyticum, Clostridium hungatei, Clostridium josui, Clostridium papyrosolvens, Clostridium sufflavum and Clostridium termitidis reassigned in 2018.
    - Genus Thermoclostridium: Clostridium caenicola and C. stercorarium, reassigned in 2018.
  - Family Peptostreptococcaceae
    - Genus Acetoanaerobium: Clostridium sticklandii, reassigned in 2016.
    - Genus Clostridioides: Clostridium difficile and C. mangenotii, reassigned in 2016.
    - Genus Filifactor: Clostridium villosum, reassigned in 1994.
    - Genus Maledivibacter: Clostridium halophilum, reassigned in 2016.
    - Genus Paraclostridium: Clostridium bifermentans, reassigned in 2016. C. ghonii and C. sordellii, were first reassigned to Paeniclostridium in 2016 and merged into Paraclostridium in 2024. Both genera remained in Clostridiaceae until 2024.
    - Genus Paramaledivibacter: Clostridium caminithermale, reassigned in 2016.
    - Genus Peptacetobacter: Clostridium hiranonis, reassigned in 2020.
    - Genus Peptoclostridium: C. litorale, reassigned in 2016.
  - Family Syntrophomonadaceae
    - Genus Syntrophospora: Clostridium bryantii, reassigned in 1990.
- Order Fusobacteriales
  - Family Fusobacteriaceae
    - Genus Fusobacterium: Clostridium rectum, merged into Fusobacterium mortiferum in 2017.
- Order Halanaerobiales
  - Family Halobacteroidaceae
    - Genus Sporohalobacter: Clostridium lortetii, reassigned in 1984.
- Order Selenomonadales
  - Family Sporomusaceae
    - Genus Dendrosporobacter: Clostridium quercicolum, reassigned in 2000.
- Order Thermoanaerobacterales
  - Family Thermoanaerobacteraceae
    - Genus Moorella: Clostridium thermaceticum and C. thermautotrophicum, reassigned in 1994.
    - Genus Thermoanaerobacter: Clostridium thermohydrosulfuricum and C. thermosulfurigenes, reassigned in 1993 and Clostridium thermocopriae and C. thermosaccharolyticum, reassigned in 1994.
- Order Tissierellales
  - Family Gottschalkiaceae
    - Genus Gottschalkia: Clostridium acidurici and C. purinilyticum, first proposed in 2013 together with Clostridium angusta, reassigned in 2017.
  - Family Tissierellaceae
    - Genus Schnuerera: Clostridium ultunense, reassigned in 2020.
    - Genus Tissierella: Clostridium hastiforme, reassigned in 1986.
  - Unassigned to family
    - Genus Sedimentibacter: C. hydroxybenzoicum, reassigned in 2002.
