= Solventogenesis =

Biochemical production of solvents

Solventogenesis is the biochemical production of solvents (usually acetone and butanol) by Clostridium species. It is the second phase of ABE fermentation.

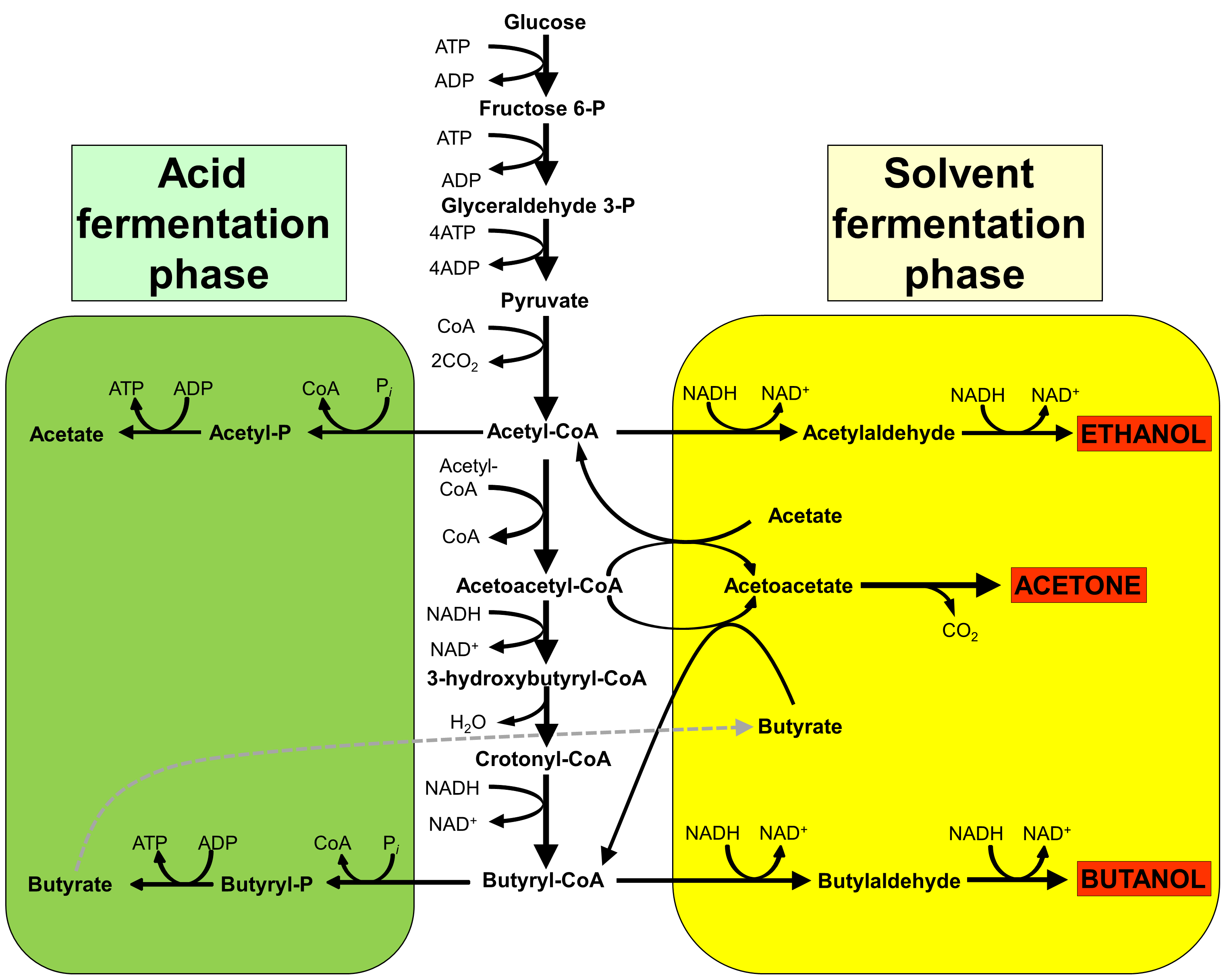
This figure shows acidogenic and solventogenic phases of ABE fermentation by solventogenic Clostridium species.

== Process ==
Solventogenic Clostridium species have a biphasic metabolism composed of an acidogenic phase and a solventogenic phase. During acidogenesis, these bacteria are able to convert several carbon sources into organic acids, commonly butyrate and acetate. As acid accumulates, cells begin to assimilate the organic acids into solvents. In Clostridium acetobutylicum, a model solventogenic Clostridium species, a combination of low pH and high undisociated butyrate, referred to as the "pH-acid effect", triggers the metabolic shift from acidogenesis to solventogenesis.

== Products ==
Acetone, butanol, and ethanol are the most common products of solventogenesis. Some species such as Clostridium beijerinckii, Clostridium puniceum and Clostridium roseum are able to further reduce acetone to isopropanol. Several species are able to produce additional solvents under various culture conditions. For example, glycerol fermentation results in the production of 1,3-propanediol in several species. Acetoin is produced by several species and is further reduced to 2,3-butanediol by Clostridium beijerinckii.

== List of solventogenic Clostridium ==
- Clostridium acetobutylicum
- Clostridium aurantibutyricum
- Clostridium beijerinckii
- Clostridium butyricum
- Clostridium cadaveris
- Clostridium carboxidivorans
- Clostridium chauvoei
- Clostridium felsineum
- Clostridium pasteurianum
- Clostridium puniceum
- Clostridium roseum
- Clostridium saccharobutylicum
- Clostridium saccharoperbutylacetonicum
- Clostridium tetanomorphum
- Clostridium thermosaccharolyticum
- Clostridium tyrobutyricum
