= Clostridium vulturis =

Scientific classification
- Domain: Bacteria
- Kingdom: Bacillati
- Phylum: Bacillota
- Class: Clostridia
- Order: Eubacteriales
- Family: Clostridiaceae
- Genus: Clostridium
- Species: C. vulturis

Binomial name
- Clostridium vulturis Paek et al. 2015

Clostridium-genus bacteria

Clostridium vulturis is a gram-positive, rod-shaped, spore-forming, anaerobic bacterium, originally found in the intestine of a cinereous vulture in Korea. Part of the Clostridium genus, C. vulturis is closely related to Clostridium subterminale (96.9% genome similarity), Clostridium thiosulfatireducens (96.7% genome similarity), Clostridium sulfidigenes (96.6% genome similarity), and Clostridium amazonense (with 97.4% genome similarity).

Clostridium vulturis produces several fermentation products, including acetate, butyrate, ethanol, propanol, carbon dioxide, and hydrogen.
