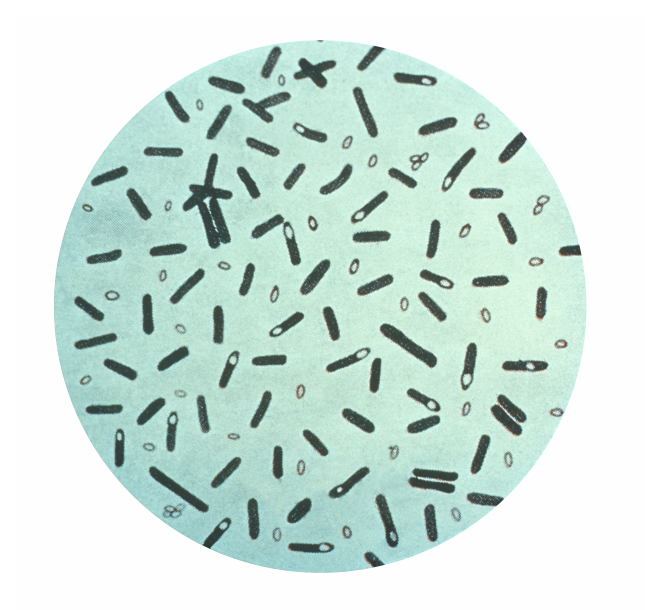
- Clostridium botulinum, stained with gentian violet

Scientific classification
- Domain: Bacteria
- Kingdom: Bacillati
- Phylum: Bacillota
- Class: Clostridia
- Order: Eubacteriales
- Family: Clostridiaceae
- Genus: Clostridium
- Species: C. botulinum

Binomial name
- Clostridium botulinum van Ermengem, 1896

= Clostridium botulinum =

Species of endospore forming bacterium

Clostridium botulinum is a gram-positive, rod-shaped, anaerobic, spore-forming, motile bacterium that has the ability to produce botulinum toxin, which is a highly potent neurotoxin.

C. botulinum is a diverse group of pathogenic bacteria. Initially, they were grouped together by their ability to produce botulinum toxin and are now known as four distinct groups, C. botulinum groups I–IV. Along with some strains of Clostridium butyricum and Clostridium baratii, these bacteria all produce the toxin.

Botulinum toxin can cause botulism, a severe flaccid paralytic disease in humans and other animals. The botulinum toxin is the most potent toxin known in scientific literature, natural or synthetic, with a lethal dose of 1.3–2.1 ng/kg in humans.

C. botulinum is commonly associated with bulging canned food; misshapen cans can be due to an internal increase in pressure caused by gas produced by bacteria. C. botulinum can also grow in traditionally aged meats (such as igunaq) and carrion (such as a dead beached whale).

C. botulinum is responsible for food-borne botulism (ingestion of preformed toxin), infant botulism (intestinal infection with toxin-forming C. botulinum), and wound botulism (infection of a wound with C. botulinum). C. botulinum produces heat-resistant endospores that are commonly found in soil and are able to survive under adverse conditions.

== Microbiology ==
C. botulinum is an obligate anaerobe, requiring an environment that lacks oxygen. However, C. botulinum tolerates traces of oxygen due to the enzyme superoxide dismutase, which is an important antioxidant defense in nearly all cells exposed to oxygen. C. botulinum is able to produce the neurotoxin only during sporulation, which can happen only in an anaerobic environment.

C. botulinum is divided into four distinct phenotypic groups (I-IV) and is also classified into seven serotypes (A–G) based on the antigenicity of the botulinum toxin produced. On the level visible to DNA sequences, the phenotypic grouping matches the results of whole-genome and rRNA analyses, and setotype grouping approximates the result of analyses focused specifically on the toxin sequence. The two phylogenetic trees do not match because of the ability of the toxin gene cluster to be horizontally transferred.

=== Serotypes ===
Botulinum neurotoxin (BoNT) production is the unifying feature of the species. Seven serotypes of toxins have been identified that are allocated a letter (A–G), several of which can cause disease in humans. They are resistant to degradation by enzymes found in the gastrointestinal tract. This allows for ingested toxins to be absorbed from the intestines into the bloodstream. Toxins can be further differentiated into subtypes on the bases of smaller variations. However, all types of botulinum toxin are rapidly destroyed by heating to 100 °C (212 °F) for 15 minutes (900 seconds). 80 °C (176 °F) for 30 minutes also destroys BoNT.

Most strains produce one type of BoNT, but strains producing multiple toxins have been described. C. botulinum producing B and F toxin types have been isolated from human botulism cases in New Mexico and California. The toxin type has been designated Bf as the type B toxin was found in excess to the type F. Similarly, strains producing Ab and Af toxins have been reported.

Evidence indicates the neurotoxin genes have been the subject of horizontal gene transfer, possibly from a viral (bacteriophage) source. This theory is supported by the presence of integration sites flanking the toxin in some strains of C. botulinum. However, these integrations sites are degraded (except for the C and D types), indicating that the C. botulinum acquired the toxin genes quite far in the evolutionary past. Nevertheless, further transfers still happen via the plasmids and other mobile elements the genes are located on.

==== Toxin types in disease ====
Botulinum toxin types A, B, E, F and H (FA) cause disease in humans. Types A, B, and E are associated with food-borne illness, while type E is specifically associated with fish products. Type C produces limber-neck in birds and type D causes botulism in other mammals. No disease is associated with type G. The "gold standard" for determining toxin type is a mouse bioassay, but the genes for types A, B, E, and F can now be readily differentiated using quantitative PCR. Type "H" is in fact a recombinant toxin from types A and F. It can be neutralized by type A antitoxin and no longer is considered a distinct type.

A few strains from organisms genetically identified as other Clostridium species have caused human botulism: C. butyricum has produced type E toxin and C. baratii has produced type F toxin. The ability of C. botulinum to naturally transfer neurotoxin genes to other clostridia is concerning, especially in the food industry, where preservation systems are designed to destroy or inhibit only C. botulinum but not other Clostridium species.

=== Metabolism ===
Many C. botulinum genes play a role in the breakdown of essential carbohydrates and the metabolism of sugars. Chitin is the preferred source of carbon and nitrogen for C. botulinum. Hall A strain of C. botulinum has an active chitinolytic system to aid in the breakdown of chitin. Type A and B of C. botulinum production of BoNT is affected by nitrogen and carbon nutrition. There is evidence that these processes are also under catabolite repression.

Proteolytic Clostridium often rely on amino acids as carbon and energy sources. They carry out a unique metabolic process called Stickland Fermentation. In this process, two amino acids are used in complementary roles. One will serve as an electron donor, and the other amino acid serves as an electron acceptor. Not only does this reaction create precursors for other metabolic pathways, but it also regenerates NAD+, an important oxidizing agent in the Embden-Meyerhof-Parnas pathway. Utilizing amino acids as a carbon source and regenerating NAD+ allows C. botulinum to thrive in anaerobic environments.

=== Groups ===
Physiological differences and genome sequencing at 16S rRNA level support the subdivision of the C. botulinum species into groups I-IV. Some authors have briefly used groups V and VI, corresponding to toxin-producing C. baratii and C. butyricum. What used to be group IV is now C. argentinense. Being each as different from each other as bacterial species are, they have developed some obvious phenotypical differences:

Genogroups of toxin-producing Clostridium
Property	Group I	Group II	Group III	C. argentinense (IV)	C. baratii (V)	C. butyricum (VI)
Proteolysis (casein)	+	-	-	+	-	-
Saccharolysis	-	+	-	-		
Lipase	+	+	+	-	-	-
Toxin Types	A, B, F	B, E, F	C, D	G	F	E
Toxin gene	chromosome/plasmid	chromosome/plasmid	bacteriophage	plasmid	chromosome	chromosome
Close relatives	C. sporogenes; C. combesii	C. beijerinckii; C. butyricum	C. novyi type A; C. haemolyticum	N/A (already a species)		

Although group II cannot degrade native protein such as casein, coagulated egg white, and cooked meat particles, it is able to degrade gelatin.

Human botulism is predominantly caused by group I or II C. botulinum. Group III organisms mainly cause diseases in non-human animals.

=== Laboratory isolation ===
In the laboratory, C. botulinum is usually isolated in tryptose sulfite cycloserine (TSC) growth medium in an anaerobic environment with less than 2% oxygen. This can be achieved by several commercial kits that use a chemical reaction to replace O_{2} with CO_{2}. C. botulinum (groups I through III) is a lipase-positive microorganism that grows between pH of 4.8 and 7.0 and cannot use lactose as a primary carbon source, characteristics important for biochemical identification.

=== Transmission, sporulation, and germination ===
Sporulation and germination in Clostridium botulinum is a major virulence factor, allowing the bacteria to be prevalent in a wide variety of environments, and botulism to exist in many forms. The exact mechanism behind sporulation and germination of C. botulinum is not known, but the study of Bacillus subtilus can be used to give a general prediction of the mechanism.

Different strains of C. botulinum can be divided into three different groups, group I, II, and III, based on environmental conditions like heat resistance, temperature, and biome. Within each group, different strains will use different strategies to adapt to their environment to survive. Unlike other clostridial species, C. botulinum spores will sporulate as it enters the stationary phase. C. botulinum relies on quorum-sensing to initiate the sporulation process.

C. botulinum begins sporulation once its sporulation protein becomes phosphorylated. The phosphorylation activates the stage I and II sporulation genes that halt cell division, and begin creation of an asymmetric septum and the spore. The cell forms spore layers until the spore is fully mature, after which, the cell is covered in exosporium. Group I cells have a thick yet loose exosporium layer that allows the spore to be heat-resistant, while group III have a thin yet tight exosporium layer that leaves the cell with a moderate amount of heat-resistance.

Germination will begin if specific nutrients called germinants interact with receptors found within the spore. Once the germinants are bound to the cell, the cell begins to hydrolyze itself to rehydrate its core and create a vegetative cell. C. botulinum spores are not found in human feces unless the individual has contracted botulism, but C. botulinum cannot spread from person to person.

=== Motility structures ===
The most common motility structure for C. botulinum is a flagellum. Though this structure is not found in all strains of C. botulinum, most produce peritrichous flagella. When comparing the different strains, there are also differences in the length of the flagella and how many are present on the cell.

Genomic analyses of C. botulinum have shown many strains to harbor mutations in flagellar genes, including flaA, which encodes the flagellin protein, and flhA and flgN, which are involved in flagellar biosynthesis. These mutations can change motility to varying extents, and in some cases, may modify the structure of the flagellum without fully impairing its function. Flagella are important in colonization and movement in gut environments, but also have immunogenic properties that make the bacterium more visible to host defenses. As a result, strains may downregulating flagellar production or acquire mutations that change flagellar assembly, so they can be used for motility but also evade the immune system during colonization.

== Growth conditions and prevention ==
C. botulinum is a soil bacterium. The spores can survive in most environments and are very hard to kill. They can survive the temperature of boiling water at sea level, thus many foods are canned with a pressurized boil that achieves even higher temperatures, sufficient to kill the spores. This bacteria is widely distributed in nature and can be assumed to be present on all food surfaces. Its optimum growth temperature is within the mesophilic range. In spore form, it is a heat resistant pathogen that can survive in low acid foods and grow to produce toxins. The toxin attacks the nervous system and will kill an adult at a dose of around 75 ng. Botulinum toxin can be destroyed by holding food at 100 °C (212 °F) for 10 minutes; however, because of its potency, this is not recommended by the USA's FDA as a means of control.

Botulism poisoning can occur due to preserved or home-canned, low-acid food that was not processed using correct preservation times and/or pressure. Growth of the bacterium can be prevented by high acidity, high ratio of dissolved sugar, high levels of oxygen, very low levels of moisture, or storage at temperatures below 3 °C (37 °F) for type A. For example, low-acid, canned vegetables (such as green beans) that are not heated enough to kill the spores (i.e., a pressurized environment) may provide an oxygen-free medium for the spores to grow and produce the toxin. However, pickles are sufficiently acidic to prevent growth; even if the spores are present, they pose no danger to the consumer.

Honey, corn syrup, and other sweeteners may contain spores, but the spores cannot grow in a highly concentrated sugar solution; however, when a sweetener is diluted in the low-oxygen, low-acid digestive system of an infant, the spores can grow and produce toxin. As soon as infants begin eating solid food, the digestive juices become too acidic for the bacterium to grow.

The control of food-borne botulism caused by C. botulinum is based almost entirely on thermal destruction (heating) of the spores or inhibiting spore germination into bacteria and allowing cells to grow and produce toxins in foods. Conditions conducive of growth are dependent on various environmental factors. Growth of C. botulinum is a risk in low acid foods as defined by having a pH greater than 4.6 although growth is significantly retarded for pH below 4.9.

=== Mechanisms of tolerance ===
C. botulinum is very resilient against many mechanisms of food processing because of the endospores that it produces. These endospores allow the bacteria to survive extreme conditions such as heat, cold, and high or low acidity. These endospores have multiple thick protective layers which allow the bacteria to survive in a dormant state for very long periods of time. The endospores can remain dormant in the bacteria, and in this state they are harmless. As endospores germinate when they are subject to environments with low oxygen, they multiply producing the neurotoxin that causes botulism.

== Taxonomic history ==
Genomic information
- NCBI ID: GCF_000063585.1
- Specimen sequenced: Sample from str. ATCC 3502
- Ploidy: haploid
- Genome size: 3.91 Mb
- Number of chromosomes: 2 (1 plasmid)
- Year of completion: 2007

C. botulinum was first recognized and isolated in 1895 by Emile van Ermengem from home-cured ham implicated in a botulism outbreak. The isolate was originally named Bacillus botulinus, after the Latin word for sausage, botulus. ("Sausage poisoning" was a common problem in 18th- and 19th-century Germany, and was most likely caused by botulism.) However, isolates from subsequent outbreaks were always found to be anaerobic spore formers, so Ida A. Bengtson proposed that both be placed into the genus Clostridium, as the genus Bacillus was restricted to aerobic spore-forming rods.

Since 1959, all species producing the botulinum neurotoxins (types A–G) have been designated C. botulinum. Substantial phenotypic and genotypic evidence exists to demonstrate heterogeneity within the species, with at least four clearly defined "groups" (see § Groups) straddling other species, implying that they each deserve to be a genospecies.

The situation as of 2018 is as follows:

- C. botulinum type G (= group IV) strains are since 1988 their own species, C. argentinense.
- Group I C. botulinum strains that do not produce a botulin toxin are referred to as C. sporogenes. Both names are conserved names since 1999. Group I also contains C. combesii.
- All other botulinum toxin-producing bacteria, not otherwise classified as C. baratii (V) or C. butyricum (VI), is called C. botulinum. This group still contains three genogroups (I, II, III).

Smith et al. (2018) argues that group I should be called C. parabotulinum and group III be called C. novyi sensu lato, leaving only group II in C. botulinum. This argument is not accepted by the LPSN and would cause an unjustified change of the type strain under the Prokaryotic Code. (The current type strain ATCC 25763 falls into group I.) Dobritsa et al. (2018) argues, without formal descriptions, that group II can potentially be made into two new species.

The complete genome of C. botulinum ATCC 3502 has been sequenced at Wellcome Trust Sanger Institute in 2007. This strain encodes a type "A" toxin.

== Diagnosis ==
Physicians may consider the diagnosis of botulism based on a patient's clinical presentation, which classically includes an acute onset of bilateral cranial neuropathies and symmetric descending weakness. Other key features of botulism include an absence of fever, symmetric neurologic deficits, normal or slow heart rate and normal blood pressure, and no sensory deficits except for blurred vision. A careful history and physical examination is paramount to diagnose the type of botulism, as well as to rule out other conditions with similar findings, such as Guillain–Barré syndrome, stroke, and myasthenia gravis. Depending on the type of botulism considered, different tests for diagnosis may be indicated.

- Foodborne botulism: serum analysis for toxins by bioassay in mice should be done, as the demonstration of the toxins is diagnostic.
- Wound botulism: isolation of C. botulinum from the wound site should be attempted, as growth of the bacteria is diagnostic.
- Adult enteric and infant botulism: isolation and growth of C. botulinum from stool samples is diagnostic. Infant botulism is a diagnosis which is often missed in the emergency room.

Other tests that may be helpful in ruling out other conditions are:

- Electromyography (EMG) or antibody studies may help with the exclusion of myasthenia gravis and Lambert–Eaton myasthenic syndrome (LEMS).
- Collection of cerebrospinal fluid (CSF) protein and blood assist with the exclusion of Guillan-Barre syndrome and stroke.
- Detailed physical examination of the patient for any rash or tick presence helps with the exclusion of any tick transmitted tick paralysis.

== Pathology ==
=== Foodborne botulism ===
Signs and symptoms of foodborne botulism typically begin between 18 and 36 hours after the toxin gets into the body, but can range from a few hours to several days, depending on the amount of toxin ingested. Symptoms include:

- Double vision
- Blurred vision
- Ptosis
- Nausea, vomiting, and abdominal cramps
- Slurred speech
- Trouble breathing
- Difficulty in swallowing
- Dry mouth
- Muscle weakness
- Constipation
- Reduced or absent deep tendon reactions, such as in the knee

=== Wound botulism ===
Wound botulism is extremely rare. Most people who develop wound botulism are those who inject illicit drugs several times a day, so determining a timeline of when onset symptoms first occurred and when the toxin entered the body can be difficult. It is most common in people who inject black tar heroin, and those who inject intramuscularly or subcutaneously, rather than intravenously. Wound botulism signs and symptoms include:

- Difficulty swallowing or speaking
- Facial weakness on both sides of the face
- Blurred or double vision
- Ptosis
- Trouble breathing
- Paralysis

=== Infant botulism ===
If infant botulism is related to food, such as honey, problems generally begin within 18 to 36 hours after the toxin enters the baby's body. Signs and symptoms include:

- Constipation (often the first sign)
- Floppy movements due to muscle weakness and trouble controlling the head
- Weak cry
- Irritability
- Drooling
- Ptosis
- Tiredness
- Difficulty sucking or feeding
- Paralysis

=== Beneficial effects of botulinum toxin ===
Purified botulinum toxin is diluted by a physician for treatment of:

- Congenital pelvic tilt
- Spasmodic dysphasia (intermittent spasming of the vocal cords)
- Achalasia (esophageal stricture)
- Strabismus (crossed eyes)
- Paralysis of the facial muscles
- Failure of the cervix
- Frequent blinking
- Anti-cancer drug delivery

=== Adult intestinal toxemia ===
A very rare form of botulism that occurs by the same route as infant botulism but is among adults. Occurs rarely and sporadically. Signs and symptoms include:

- Abdominal pain
- Blurred vision
- Diarrhea
- Dysarthria
- Imbalance
- Weakness in arms and hand area

=== Veterinary pathology ===
Most cases of botulism in animals come from foodborne botulism, though wound botulism is also common. Foodborne botulism comes from ingestion of infected material, like raw or decaying vegetation, carcasses, or larvae that have consumed infected material. Ruminants have longer incubation times for foodborne botulism when compared to animals with less complex stomachs. Wound botulism occurs when a wound becomes infected with Clostridium botulinum that is allowed to germinate and produce toxins.

Toxicoinfection can also cause botulism cases as Clostridium botulinum cells infect the lower intestine and begin to produce toxins. The toxin is either expelled as feces from the animal, not causing any harm but spreading the toxin, or, if in close proximity to the beginning of the small intestine, causes symptoms to present in the host.

Botulism symptoms in cattle and horses can begin with weakness or trembling in the hindquarters which progresses into full body paralysis and eventually death. Avian botulism is characterized by the inability of the animal to fly, walk, lift its neck, or close its inner eyelid, followed by death. Small carnivores, like foxes, mink, and ferrets, are prone to botulism and will present flaccid paralysis, then die. An infected fish will have each of its fins paralyzed over time until the tail fin is fully paralyzed, preventing swimming, killing the fish.

== Treatment ==
In the case of a diagnosis or suspicion of botulism, patients should be hospitalized immediately, even if the diagnosis and/or tests are pending. Additionally, if botulism is suspected, patients should be treated immediately with antitoxin therapy in order to reduce mortality. Immediate intubation is also highly recommended, as respiratory failure is the primary cause of death from botulism.

In North America, an equine-derived heptavalent botulinum antitoxin is used to treat all serotypes of non-infant naturally occurring botulism. For infants less than one year of age, botulism immune globulin is used to treat type A or type B.

Outcomes vary between one and three months, but with prompt interventions, mortality from botulism ranges from less than 5 percent to 8 percent.

Despite these interventions, there is currently no approved pharmacological treatment that reverses botulinum neurotoxin once it has entered neurons. Due to this limitation, early antitoxin administration and supportive care is critical. Ongoing research investigates several therapeutic strategies; for example, recombinant vaccines based on the heavy-chain (HC) domains of BoNTs have provided protective immunity in animals and shown promise in early clinical trials. However, no human vaccine is currently licensed. Veterinary vaccines are available to prevent outbreaks in livestock.

Antibody-based therapies are also under development. Traditional equine antitoxins, though effective, carry risks of serum sickness. Human polyclonal antibodies isolated from immunized volunteers and novel camelid single-domain antibodies are two alternatives, which may provide safer and longer-lasting protection. Additionally, small-molecule inhibitors targeting the metalloprotease activity of the toxin’s light chain are being explored as potential post-exposure therapies.

Clinical outcomes also depend on the toxin serotype involved. Type A toxins typically cause the most prolonged paralysis, while type E toxins are associated with shorter disease courses. Although BoNTs induce paralysis, they do not destroy neurons; with adequate ventilation and intensive care, patients can fully recover as nerve terminals regenerate.

Due to the extreme potency of botulinum neurotoxins, much of this therapeutic research is framed in context of biodefense preparedness against the potential use of BoNTs as biological weapons.

== Vaccination ==
There used to be a formalin-treated toxoid vaccine against botulism (serotypes A-E), but it was discontinued in 2011 due to declining potency in the toxoid stock. It was originally intended for people at risk of exposure. A few new vaccines are under development.

== Use and detection ==
C. botulinum is used to prepare the medicaments Botox, Dysport, Xeomin, and Neurobloc used to selectively paralyze muscles to temporarily relieve muscle function. It has other "off-label" medical purposes, such as treating severe facial pain, such as that caused by trigeminal neuralgia.

Botulinum toxin produced by C. botulinum is often believed to be a potential bioweapon as it is so potent that it takes about 75 nanograms to kill a person (LD_{50} of 1 ng/kg, assuming an average person weighs ~75 kg); 1 kilogram of it would be enough to kill the entire human population.

A "mouse protection" or "mouse bioassay" test determines the type of C. botulinum toxin present using monoclonal antibodies. An enzyme-linked immunosorbent assay (ELISA) with digoxigenin-labeled antibodies can also be used to detect the toxin, and quantitative PCR can detect the toxin genes in the organism.

== C. botulinum in different geographical locations ==
A number of quantitative surveys for C. botulinum spores in the environment have suggested a prevalence of specific toxin types in given geographic areas, which remain unexplained.

Location	
North America	Type A C. botulinum predominates the soil samples from the western regions, while type B is the major type found in eastern areas. The type-B organisms were of the proteolytic Group I. Sediments from the Great Lakes region were surveyed after outbreaks of botulism among commercially reared fish, and only type E spores were detected. In a survey, type-A strains were isolated from soils that were neutral to alkaline (average pH 7.5), while type-B strains were isolated from slightly acidic soils (average pH 6.23).
Europe	C. botulinum type E is prevalent in aquatic sediments in Norway and Sweden, Denmark, the Netherlands, the Baltic coast of Poland, and Russia. The type-E C. botulinum was suggested to be a true aquatic organism, which was indicated by the correlation between the level of type-E contamination and flooding of the land with seawater. As the land dried, the level of type E decreased and type B became dominant. In soil and sediment from the United Kingdom, C. botulinum type B predominates. In general, the incidence is usually lower in soil than in sediment. In Italy, a survey conducted in the vicinity of Rome found a low level of contamination; all strains were proteolytic (Group I) C. botulinum types A or B.
Australia	C. botulinum type A was found to be present in soil samples from mountain areas of Victoria. Type-B organisms were detected in marine mud from Tasmania. Type-A C. botulinum has been found in Sydney suburbs and types A and B were isolated from urban areas. In a well-defined area of the Darling-Downs region of Queensland, a study showed the prevalence and persistence of C. botulinum type B after many cases of botulism in horses.
