= Clostridium cellulofermentans =

Scientific classification
- Domain: Bacteria
- Kingdom: Bacillati
- Phylum: Bacillota
- Class: Clostridia
- Order: Eubacteriales
- Family: Clostridiaceae
- Genus: Clostridium
- Species: C. cellulofermentans

Binomial name
- Clostridium cellulofermentans He et al. 1991

Species of bacterium

Clostridium cellulofermentans is a Gram-negative and cellulolytic bacterium from the genus of Clostridium.
