= Clostridium colicanis =

Scientific classification
- Domain: Bacteria
- Kingdom: Bacillati
- Phylum: Bacillota
- Class: Clostridia
- Order: Eubacteriales
- Family: Clostridiaceae
- Genus: Clostridium
- Species: C. colicanis

Binomial name
- Clostridium colicanis Greetham et al. 2003

Species of bacterium

Clostridium colicanis is an anaerobic, motile, gram-positive bacterium.
