= Clostridium luticellarii =

Scientific classification
- Domain: Bacteria
- Kingdom: Bacillati
- Phylum: Bacillota
- Class: Clostridia
- Order: Eubacteriales
- Family: Clostridiaceae
- Genus: Clostridium
- Species: C. luticellarii

Binomial name
- Clostridium luticellarii Wang et al. 2015

Type strain
- CGMCC 1.5201, FW431, KCTC 15519

Synonyms
- Clostridium cellarii

Species of bacterium

Clostridium luticellarii is a species of Gram-positive and strictly anaerobic bacterium from the genus Clostridium which has been isolated from mud from Sichuan in China.
