= Clostridium akagii =

Scientific classification
- Domain: Bacteria
- Kingdom: Bacillati
- Phylum: Bacillota
- Class: Clostridia
- Order: Eubacteriales
- Family: Clostridiaceae
- Genus: Clostridium
- Species: C. akagii

Binomial name
- Clostridium akagii Kuhner et al. 2000

Type strain
- ATCC BAA-166, CK58, DSM 12554

Species of bacterium

Clostridium akagii is a nitrogen-fixing and anaerobic bacterium from the genus Clostridium which has been isolated from the Fichtel Mountains in Germany.
