= Clostridiales-1 RNA motif =

Clostridiales-1 RNA
- Consensus secondary structure of Clostridiales-1 RNAs

Identifiers
- Symbol: Clostridiales-1
- Rfam: RF01699

Other data
- RNA type: sRNA
- Domain: Clostridiales
- PDB structures: PDBe

The Clostridiales-1 RNA motif is a conserved RNA structure identified by bioinformatics. It is a four-stem structure common in bacteria that inhabit the human gut and is also found in a variety of bacteria classified within the order Clostridiales. Its function is unknown.
