= Clostridium gasigenes =

Scientific classification
- Domain: Bacteria
- Kingdom: Bacillati
- Phylum: Bacillota
- Class: Clostridia
- Order: Eubacteriales
- Family: Clostridiaceae
- Genus: Clostridium
- Species: C. gasigenes

Binomial name
- Clostridium gasigenes Broda et al. 2000

Type strain
- ATCC BAA-158, CIP 106517, DB1A, DSM 12272

Species of bacterium

Clostridium gasigenes is a species of anaerobic, gram-positive psychrophilic bacterium from the genus Clostridium which has been isolated from lamb meat in New Zealand. This species is associated with spoilage in vacuum packed meats.
