= Clostridium disporicum =

Scientific classification
- Domain: Bacteria
- Kingdom: Bacillati
- Phylum: Bacillota
- Class: Clostridia
- Order: Eubacteriales
- Family: Clostridiaceae
- Genus: Clostridium
- Species: C. disporicum

Binomial name
- Clostridium disporicum Horn 1987

Type strain
- ATCC 43838, BCRC 14547, CCRC 14547, DS1, DSM 5521, Horn DS1, NCIB 12424, NCIMB 12424, VTT E-042448

Species of bacterium

Clostridium disporicum is a Gram-positive, rod-shaped and anaerobic bacterium from the genus Clostridium which has been isolated from the caecum of a rat in England.
