= Clostridium homopropionicum =

Scientific classification
- Domain: Bacteria
- Kingdom: Bacillati
- Phylum: Bacillota
- Class: Clostridia
- Order: Eubacteriales
- Family: Clostridiaceae
- Genus: Clostridium
- Species: C. homopropionicum

Binomial name
- Clostridium homopropionicum Dörner and Schink 1991

Type strain
- ATCC 51426, Bu1, DSM 5847, LuHBu1

Species of bacterium

Clostridium homopropionicum is a strictly anaerobic bacterium from the genus Clostridium which has been isolated from sewage sludge in Germany.
