= Clostridium herbivorans =

Scientific classification
- Domain: Bacteria
- Kingdom: Bacillati
- Phylum: Bacillota
- Class: Clostridia
- Order: Eubacteriales
- Family: Clostridiaceae
- Genus: Clostridium
- Species: C. herbivorans

Binomial name
- Clostridium herbivorans Varel et al. 1995

Type strain
- 54408, ATCC 49925, CIP 104610, DSM 14428 VTT E-052845

Species of bacterium

Clostridium herbivorans is a Gram-positive, cellulolytic and motile bacterium from the genus Clostridium which has been isolated from the intestinal tract of pigs.
