= Clostridium aminophilum =

Scientific classification
- Domain: Bacteria
- Kingdom: Bacillati
- Phylum: Bacillota
- Class: Clostridia
- Order: Eubacteriales
- Family: Clostridiaceae
- Genus: Clostridium
- Species: C. aminophilum

Binomial name
- Clostridium aminophilum Paster et al. 1993

Species of bacterium

Clostridium aminophilum is a species of gram-positive ammonia-producing ruminal bacteria, with type strain FT.

Clostridium aminphilum is involved in inefficient nitrogen use by animals such as cows. Due to an inability to hydrolyze intact protein or ferment carbohydrates, Clostridium aminophilum seems to occupy the niche in the rumen of peptide and amino acid fermentation.
