= Clostridium arcticum =

Scientific classification
- Domain: Bacteria
- Kingdom: Bacillati
- Phylum: Bacillota
- Class: Clostridia
- Order: Eubacteriales
- Family: Clostridiaceae
- Genus: Clostridium
- Species: C. arcticum

Binomial name
- Clostridium arcticum (ex Jordan and McNicol 1979) Cato et al. 1988

Species of bacteria

Clostridium arcticum is a species of anaerobic, gram-positive bacteria belonging to the family Clostridiaceae.
