= Clostridium aestuarii =

Scientific classification
- Domain: Bacteria
- Kingdom: Bacillati
- Phylum: Bacillota
- Class: Clostridia
- Order: Eubacteriales
- Family: Clostridiaceae
- Genus: Clostridium
- Species: C. aestuarii

Binomial name
- Clostridium aestuarii Kim et al. 2007

Type strain
- DSM 19521, IMSNU 40129, JCM 13194, KCTC 5147, HY-45-18

Synonyms
- Clostridium dongmakense

Species of bacterium

Clostridium aestuarii is a halophilic, strictly anaerobic, spore-forming, rod-shaped and motile bacterium from the genus Clostridium which has been isolated from tidal flat sediments.
