= Clostridium bowmanii =

Scientific classification
- Domain: Bacteria
- Kingdom: Bacillati
- Phylum: Bacillota
- Class: Clostridia
- Order: Eubacteriales
- Family: Clostridiaceae
- Genus: Clostridium
- Species: C. bowmanii

Binomial name
- Clostridium bowmanii Spring et al. 2003

Type strain
- A-1/C-an/C1, ATCC BAA-581, DSM 14206, H11

Species of bacterium

Clostridium bowmanii is a psychrophilic, Gram-positive, anaerobic and spore-forming bacterium from the genus Clostridium.
