= Clostridium liquoris =

Scientific classification
- Domain: Bacteria
- Kingdom: Bacillati
- Phylum: Bacillota
- Class: Clostridia
- Order: Eubacteriales
- Family: Clostridiaceae
- Genus: Clostridium
- Species: C. liquoris

Binomial name
- Clostridium liquoris Yin et al. 2016

Type strain
- ACCC 00785, BEY10, DSM 100320

Species of bacterium

Clostridium liquoris is a species of strictly anaerobic, Gram-positive, rod-shaped, spore-forming and non-motile bacterium from the genus of Clostridium.
