= Clostridium grantii =

Scientific classification
- Domain: Bacteria
- Kingdom: Bacillati
- Phylum: Bacillota
- Class: Clostridia
- Order: Eubacteriales
- Family: Clostridiaceae
- Genus: Clostridium
- Species: C. grantii

Binomial name
- Clostridium grantii Mountfort et al. 1996

Type strain
- A-1, CIP 105529, DSM 8605

Species of bacterium

Clostridium grantii is a Gram-positive, strictly anaerobic, rod-shaped and spore-forming bacterium from the genus Clostridium which has been isolated from the gut of a mullet. C. grantii is able to break down alginate, a major component of brown algae. The species, along with other gut microbes, likely plays a role in breaking down algal material in the gut of mullet and other vegetation feeding marine fish.
