= Clostridium scatologenes =

Scientific classification
- Domain: Bacteria
- Kingdom: Bacillati
- Phylum: Bacillota
- Class: Clostridia
- Order: Eubacteriales
- Family: Clostridiaceae
- Genus: Clostridium
- Species: C. scatologenes

Binomial name
- Clostridium scatologenes (Weinberg and Ginsbourg 1927) Prevot 1948

Species of bacterium

Clostridium scatologenes (CLOSL) is an anaerobic, motile, gram-positive bacterium.

Originally, in 1925, Fellers and Clough named this species Clostridium scatol. In 1927, Weinberg and Ginsbourg's later reclassification was Bacillus scatologenes. The species has borne its present name since 1948.
