= Clostridium huakuii =

Scientific classification
- Domain: Bacteria
- Kingdom: Bacillati
- Phylum: Bacillota
- Class: Clostridia
- Order: Eubacteriales
- Family: Clostridiaceae
- Genus: Clostridium
- Species: C. huakuii

Binomial name
- Clostridium huakuii Ruan et al. 2014

Type strain
- ACCC 00698, LAM1030, JCM 19186

Species of bacterium

Clostridium huakuii is a Gram-positive, acetogenic, obligately anaerobic and spore-forming bacterium from the genus Clostridium.
