= Clostridium cavendishii =

Scientific classification
- Domain: Bacteria
- Kingdom: Bacillati
- Phylum: Bacillota
- Class: Clostridia
- Order: Eubacteriales
- Family: Clostridiaceae
- Genus: Clostridium
- Species: C. cavendishii

Binomial name
- Clostridium cavendishii Bowman et al. 2010

Type strain
- BL-28, DSM 21758, NRRL B-51352

Species of bacterium

Clostridium cavendishii is a Gram-positive, aerotolerant, anaerobic, spore-forming and motile hydrogen-producing bacterium from the genus Clostridium which has been isolated from contaminated groundwater in the United States.
