= Clostridium hydrogeniformans =

Scientific classification
- Domain: Bacteria
- Kingdom: Bacillati
- Phylum: Bacillota
- Class: Clostridia
- Order: Eubacteriales
- Family: Clostridiaceae
- Genus: Clostridium
- Species: C. hydrogeniformans

Binomial name
- Clostridium hydrogeniformans Bowman et al. 2010

Type strain
- BL-20, DSM 21757, NRRL B-51348

Species of bacterium

Clostridium hydrogeniformans is a Gram-positive, anaerobic, hydrogen-producing, spore-forming and motile bacterium from the genus Clostridium which has been isolated from groundwater in the United States.
