= Clostridium colinum =

Scientific classification
- Domain: Bacteria
- Kingdom: Bacillati
- Phylum: Bacillota
- Class: Clostridia
- Order: Eubacteriales
- Family: Clostridiaceae
- Genus: Clostridium
- Species: C. colinum

Binomial name
- Clostridium colinum (ex Berkhoff et al. 1974) Berkhoff 1985

Type strain
- 72042, ATCC 27770, CCM 3932, CCUG 21927, DSM 6011, JCM 5831

Species of bacterium

Clostridium colinum is a Gram-positive, anaerobic and spore-forming bacterium from the genus Clostridium which has been isolated from a chicken. Clostridium colinum can cause ulcerative enteritis in chicken.
