= Clostridium carnis =

Scientific classification
- Domain: Bacteria
- Kingdom: Bacillati
- Phylum: Bacillota
- Class: Clostridia
- Order: Eubacteriales
- Family: Clostridiaceae
- Genus: Clostridium
- Species: C. carnis

Binomial name
- Clostridium carnis Spray 1939

Species of bacterium

Clostridium carnis is a species of bacteria in the genus Clostridium. This type of bacteria spends most of its time in the soil where oxygen levels are low. As a type of anaerobic metabolizer, this bacteria uses inorganic molecules other than oxygen to make its energy. However, these bacteria are able to live in oxygen environments and are considered aerotolerant. It also tends to stay in moderately warm regions where the temperature is between 20 °C and 40 °C, otherwise known as a mesophilic microbe. This bacteria is found on all continents, including antarctica, but concentrates mostly in the Northern Hemisphere.

C. carnis is a motile bacterium that uses multiple (peritrichous) flagella to move. They are also capable of making endospores during their lifecycle in order to survive harsh conditions. Using a gram-stain technique, this bacteria is found to be gram positive and bacillus (rod) shaped, similar to the other species in this genus.

During biochemical testing, this species was confirmed to be able to produce acids in the presence of sugars lactose, glucose, salicin, maltose, xylose, and arabinose, but was unable to produce acids in raffinose, trehalose, mannitol, dulcitol, adonitol, inositol, glycerol, or sorbitol. There was no evidence of amylase for this species, and also lacks the ability to produce H_{2}S, indole, gelatinase, or urea. C. carnis is unable to hemolyze blood agar plates, and it did not reduce nitrate to nitrite.

There has been one case of human infection of C. carnis of an infant documented, but noted to be a common war infection. The symptoms include severe shock, diarrhea, acidosis, hypernatremia, and haemoconcentration. The infant was treated with fluids, clocacillin 200mg/kg, and carbenicillin 200mg/kg. The infant was admitted and treated in the hospital for 20 days.

This species was also commonly found in war wounds, typically with wound debridement procedures. During documentation from the Eastern Korean border in 1953, C. carnis was noted to be present in about 3.5% of wounds in soldiers during winter, but none in the summer. It was also present in about 4.7% of soil samples. It was determined that this strain of bacteria was pathogenic in guinea pigs as well. In terms of treatment, there were ranges of sensitivity to certain percentages of penicillin, aureomycin, terramycin, and chloramphenicol, however it was found aureomycin and terramycin were able to reduce the growth of these bacteria at a lower dosage as compared to penicillin, which was the standard of care at the time. It was also noted at this time that there were less infections of this type of bacteria as compared to aerobic bacteria infections, and they often were less likely to lead to more serious infections than the other types.
