= Clostridium celatum =

Scientific classification
- Domain: Bacteria
- Kingdom: Bacillati
- Phylum: Bacillota
- Class: Clostridia
- Order: Eubacteriales
- Family: Clostridiaceae
- Genus: Clostridium
- Species: C. celatum

Binomial name
- Clostridium celatum Hauschild and Holdeman 1974

Type strain
- ATCC 27791, BCRC 14521, CCRC 14521, CIP 104316, DSM 1785, GD-1, JCM 1394, NCTC 10947, NCTC 12746, VPI 8759-1

Species of bacterium

Clostridium celatum is a Gram-positive and anaerobic bacterium from the genus Clostridium which has been isolated from human faeces.
