= Clostridium intestinale =

Scientific classification
- Domain: Bacteria
- Kingdom: Bacillati
- Phylum: Bacillota
- Class: Clostridia
- Order: Eubacteriales
- Family: Clostridiaceae
- Genus: Clostridium
- Species: C. intestinale

Binomial name
- Clostridium intestinale Lee et al. 1989

Type strain
- ATCC 49213, Catt 39, DSM 6191, JCM 7506, VTT E-032440

Synonyms
- Clostridium intestinalis

Species of bacterium

Clostridium intestinale is a bacterium from the genus Clostridium which has been isolated from faeces of a cattle in Japan. Clostridium intestinale can cause bacteremia.
