= Clostridium frigidicarnis =

Scientific classification
- Domain: Bacteria
- Kingdom: Bacillati
- Phylum: Bacillota
- Class: Clostridia
- Order: Eubacteriales
- Family: Clostridiaceae
- Genus: Clostridium
- Species: C. frigidicarnis

Binomial name
- Clostridium frigidicarnis Broda et al. 1999

Type strain
- ATCC BAA-154, DSM 12271, NCIMB 13646, SPL77, SPL77A

Species of bacterium

Clostridium frigidicarnis is a Gram-positive and psychrotolerant bacterium from the genus Clostridium which has been isolated from beef in New Zealand. C. frigidicarnis is motile and grows on sheep blood agar.
