= Clostridium algidicarnis =

Scientific classification
- Domain: Bacteria
- Kingdom: Bacillati
- Phylum: Bacillota
- Class: Clostridia
- Order: Eubacteriales
- Family: Clostridiaceae
- Genus: Clostridium
- Species: C. algidicarnis

Binomial name
- Clostridium algidicarnis Lawson et al. 1995

Type strain
- Dainty C, Dainty C NCFB2931, DSM 15099, NCFB 2931, NCIMB 702931

Species of bacterium

Clostridium algidicarnis is a psychrotrophic bacterium from the genus Clostridium which has been isolated from refrigerated pork.
