= Clostridium arbusti =

Scientific classification
- Domain: Bacteria
- Kingdom: Bacillati
- Phylum: Bacillota
- Class: Clostridia
- Order: Eubacteriales
- Family: Clostridiaceae
- Genus: Clostridium
- Species: C. arbusti

Binomial name
- Clostridium arbusti Jung et al. 2010

Type strain
- DSM 23575, JCM 14858, KCTC 5449, SL206

Species of bacterium

Clostridium arbusti is an obligately anaerobic, Gram-positive and spore-forming bacterium from the genus Clostridium which has been isolated from pear orchard soil from Daejeon in Korea.
