= Clostridium cellulovorans =

Scientific classification
- Domain: Bacteria
- Kingdom: Bacillati
- Phylum: Bacillota
- Class: Clostridia
- Order: Eubacteriales
- Family: Clostridiaceae
- Genus: Clostridium
- Species: C. cellulovorans

Binomial name
- Clostridium cellulovorans Sleat et al. 1985

Species of bacterium

Clostridium cellulovorans is an anaerobic, mesophilic, spore-forming cellulolytic bacterium. Its cells are gram-positive and are non-motile rods which form oblong spores. The type strain is 743B (ATCC 35296). Its role as an object of study is based on the latter notion.
