= Hungatei =

Hungatei may refer to:

- Butyrivibrio hungatei, species of bacteria
- Ruminiclostridium hungatei, species of bacteria
