= Clostridium bornimense =

Scientific classification
- Domain: Bacteria
- Kingdom: Bacillati
- Phylum: Bacillota
- Class: Clostridia
- Order: Eubacteriales
- Family: Clostridiaceae
- Genus: Clostridium
- Species: C. bornimense

Binomial name
- Clostridium bornimense Hahnke et al. 2014

Type strain
- CECT 8097, DSM 25664, M2/40

Species of bacterium

Clostridium bornimense is an anaerobic, mesophilic and hydrogen-producing bacterium from the genus Clostridium which has been isolated from a biogas reactor in Germany.
