= Clostridium algifaecis =

Scientific classification
- Domain: Bacteria
- Kingdom: Bacillati
- Phylum: Bacillota
- Class: Clostridia
- Order: Eubacteriales
- Family: Clostridiaceae
- Genus: Clostridium
- Species: C. algifaecis

Binomial name
- Clostridium algifaecis Wu et al. 2014

Type strain
- CGMCC 1.5188, DSM 28783, MB9-7

Species of bacterium

Clostridium algifaecis is a Gram-positive and rod-shaped bacterium from the genus Clostridium which has been isolated from decomposing algal scum from the Lake Taihu in China.
