= Creatinine deaminase =

Class of enzymes

creatinine deaminase

Identifiers
- EC no.: 3.5.4.21
- CAS no.: 37289-15-9

Databases
- BRENDA: enzyme data
- ExPASy: NiceZyme view
- KEGG: enzyme entry
- MetaCyc: metabolic pathway
- Rhea: reactions
- PDB structures: RCSB PDB PDBe PDBsum
- Gene Ontology: AmiGO / QuickGO
Search
- PMC: articles
- PubMed: articles
- NCBI: proteins

Creatinine deaminase (EC 3.5.4.21) is an enzyme characterised from Clostridium paraputrificum that catalyzes the hydrolysis of creatinine to 1-methylhydantoin and ammonia:

creatinine
H_{2}O
NH_{3}
1-methylhydantoin

This reaction has been used as a means of assaying creatinine in biological systems. The enzyme is significant in determining the composition of the infant gut microbiota.

This enzyme is a hydrolase, one acting on carbon-nitrogen bonds other than peptide bonds, specifically in cyclic amidines. The systematic name of this enzyme class is creatinine iminohydrolase. Other names in common use include creatinine hydrolase, and creatinine desiminase.
