= Clostridium isatidis =

Scientific classification
- Domain: Bacteria
- Kingdom: Bacillati
- Phylum: Bacillota
- Class: Clostridia
- Order: Eubacteriales
- Family: Clostridiaceae
- Genus: Clostridium
- Species: C. isatidis

Binomial name
- Clostridium isatidis Padden et al. 1999

Type strain
- CIP 107118, DSM 15098, NCFB 3071, NCIMB 703071, Wv6

Species of bacterium

Clostridium isatidis is a Gram-positive, anaerobic and moderate thermophilic bacterium from the genus Clostridium.
