= Clostridium paradoxum =

Scientific classification
- Domain: Bacteria
- Kingdom: Bacillati
- Phylum: Bacillota
- Class: Clostridia
- Order: Eubacteriales
- Family: Clostridiaceae
- Genus: Clostridium
- Species: C. paradoxum

Binomial name
- Clostridium paradoxum Li et al. 1993

Species of bacterium

Clostridium paradoxum is a moderately thermophilic anaerobic alkaliphile bacteria. It is motile with 2-6 peritrichous flagella and forms round to slightly oval terminal spores. Its type strain is JW-YL-7 (DSM 7308).
