= Clostridium collagenovorans =

Scientific classification
- Domain: Bacteria
- Kingdom: Bacillati
- Phylum: Bacillota
- Class: Clostridia
- Order: Eubacteriales
- Family: Clostridiaceae
- Genus: Clostridium
- Species: C. collagenovorans

Binomial name
- Clostridium collagenovorans Jain and Zeikus 1988

Type strain
- ATCC 49001, BCRC 14532, CCRC 14532, DSM 3089, LMG 11411, SG

Species of bacterium

Clostridium collagenovorans is a species of gram-positive, obligately anaerobic bacterium from the genus Clostridium which has been isolated from sewage sludge in the United States.
