= Clostridium amylolyticum =

Scientific classification
- Domain: Bacteria
- Kingdom: Bacillati
- Phylum: Bacillota
- Class: Clostridia
- Order: Eubacteriales
- Family: Clostridiaceae
- Genus: Clostridium
- Species: C. amylolyticum

Binomial name
- Clostridium amylolyticum Song and Dong 2008

Type strain
- AS 1.5069, CGMCC 1.5069, JCM 14823, SW408

Synonyms
- Clostridium mesophilum

Species of bacterium

Clostridium amylolyticum is a Gram-positive, strictly anaerobic, mesophilic, amylolytic and rod-shaped bacterium from the genus Clostridium. It has been isolated from UASB granules in China.
