= Clostridium estertheticum =

Scientific classification
- Domain: Bacteria
- Kingdom: Bacillati
- Phylum: Bacillota
- Class: Clostridia
- Order: Eubacteriales
- Family: Clostridiaceae
- Genus: Clostridium
- Species: C. estertheticum

Binomial name
- Clostridium estertheticum Collins et al. 1993 emend. Spring et al. 2003

Subspecies
- subsp. estertheticum; subsp. laramiense

Synonyms
- Clostridium laramiense

Species of bacterium

Clostridium estertheticum is an anaerobic, psychrophilic, motile, spore-forming Gram-positive bacterium.
