= Clostridium argentinense =

Scientific classification
- Domain: Bacteria
- Kingdom: Bacillati
- Phylum: Bacillota
- Class: Clostridia
- Order: Eubacteriales
- Family: Clostridiaceae
- Genus: Clostridium
- Species: C. argentinense

Binomial name
- Clostridium argentinense Suen et al. 1988

Species of bacterium

Clostridium argentinense is an anaerobic, motile, gram-positive bacterium. Some bacilli now identified as Cl. argentinense were previously classified as either Cl. subterminale, Cl. hastiforme, or Cl. botulinum toxin group G, respectively.

Like Cl. botulinum, Cl. argentinense produces botulin, a neurotoxin that causes botulism in susceptible mammals. Among this proteolytic species' products are acetic acid, butyric acid, isobutyric acid, isovaleric acid, and hydrogen sulfide. Cl. argentinense is also asaccharolytic (i.e., unable to metabolize carbohydrates).
