= Mediterraneibacter glycyrrhizinilyticus =

Scientific classification
- Domain: Bacteria
- Kingdom: Bacillati
- Phylum: Bacillota
- Class: Clostridia
- Order: Eubacteriales
- Family: Lachnospiraceae
- Genus: Mediterraneibacter
- Species: M. glycyrrhizinilyticus

Binomial name
- Mediterraneibacter glycyrrhizinilyticus (Sakuma et al. 2006) Togo et al. 2019

Type strain
- DSM 17593, JCM 13368, ZM35

Synonyms
- Clostridium glycyrrhizinilyticum

Species of bacterium

Mediterraneibacter glycyrrhizinilyticus is a Gram-positive, obligate anaerobic, non-spore-forming and rod-shaped bacterium from the genus Clostridium which has been isolated from human feces in Japan.
