= Clostridium acetireducens =

Scientific classification
- Domain: Bacteria
- Kingdom: Bacillati
- Phylum: Bacillota
- Class: Clostridia
- Order: Eubacteriales
- Family: Clostridiaceae
- Genus: Clostridium
- Species: C. acetireducens

Binomial name
- Clostridium acetireducens Örlygsson et al. 1996

Type strain
- 30A, DSM 10703

Species of bacterium

Clostridium acetireducens is a Gram-positive, rod-shaped, anaerobic and non-motile bacterium from the genus of Clostridium which has been isolated from an anaerobic bioreactor from De Krim in the Netherlands.
