= Clostridium cochlearium =

Scientific classification
- Domain: Bacteria
- Kingdom: Bacillati
- Phylum: Bacillota
- Class: Clostridia
- Order: Eubacteriales
- Family: Clostridiaceae
- Genus: Clostridium
- Species: C. cochlearium

Binomial name
- Clostridium cochlearium (Douglas et al. 1919) Bergey et al. 1923

Synonyms
- Bacillus cochlearius; Clostridium lentoputrescens

Species of bacterium

Clostridium cochlearium is a species of strictly anaerobic bacteria from the genus Clostridium.
