= Clostridium hylemonae =

Scientific classification
- Domain: Bacteria
- Kingdom: Bacillati
- Phylum: Bacillota
- Class: Clostridia
- Order: Eubacteriales
- Family: Clostridiaceae
- Genus: Clostridium
- Species: C. hylemonae

Binomial name
- Clostridium hylemonae Kitahara et al. 2000

Type strain
- CCUG 45367, CIP 106689, DSM 15053, JCM 10539, TN-271

Species of bacterium

Clostridium hylemonae is a Gram-positive and anaerobic bacterium from the genus Clostridium which has been isolated from human faeces.
