= Clostridium chartatabidum =

Scientific classification
- Domain: Bacteria
- Kingdom: Bacillati
- Phylum: Bacillota
- Class: Clostridia
- Order: Eubacteriales
- Family: Clostridiaceae
- Genus: Clostridium
- Species: C. chartatabidum

Binomial name
- Clostridium chartatabidum Kelly et al. 1996

Type strain
- 163, CIP 104882, DSM 5482

Species of bacterium

Clostridium chartatabidum is a strictly anaerobic and spore-forming bacterium from the genus Clostridium which has been isolated from an ovine rumen in New Zealand.
