= Clostridium jeddahense =

Scientific classification
- Domain: Bacteria
- Kingdom: Bacillati
- Phylum: Bacillota
- Class: Clostridia
- Order: Eubacteriales
- Family: Clostridiaceae
- Genus: Clostridium
- Species: C. jeddahense

Binomial name
- Clostridium jeddahense Lagier et al. 2016

Type strain
- CSUR P693, JCD, DSM 27834

Synonyms
- Clostridium jeddamassiliensis

Species of bacterium

Clostridium jeddahense is a strictly anaerobic, Gram-positive bacterium from the genus Clostridium which has been isolated from human faeces in Saudi Arabia.
