= Clostridium lundense =

Scientific classification
- Domain: Bacteria
- Kingdom: Bacillati
- Phylum: Bacillota
- Class: Clostridia
- Order: Eubacteriales
- Family: Clostridiaceae
- Genus: Clostridium
- Species: C. lundense

Binomial name
- Clostridium lundense Cirne et al. 2006

Type strain
- CCUG 50446, DSM 17049, R-1

Synonyms
- Clostridium lundensis

Species of bacterium

Clostridium lundense is a lipolytic, strictly anaerobic, mesophilic and spore-forming gram-positive bacterium from the genus of Clostridium which has been isolated from fluid of a cow rumen in Lund in Sweden. This species is non-motile.
