= Uliginosum =

Uliginosum may refer to:

- Actinobole uliginosum, species of dwarf annual herb
- Clostridium uliginosum, species of bacteria
- Delphinium uliginosum, species of larkspur
- Galium uliginosum, species of plant
- Gnaphalium uliginosum, species of plant
- Stylidium uliginosum, species of plant
- Vaccinium uliginosum, species of flowering plant
