= Clostridium frigoris =

Scientific classification
- Domain: Bacteria
- Kingdom: Bacillati
- Phylum: Bacillota
- Class: Clostridia
- Order: Eubacteriales
- Family: Clostridiaceae
- Genus: Clostridium
- Species: C. frigoris

Binomial name
- Clostridium frigoris Spring et al. 2003

Type strain
- ATCC BAA-579, D-1/D-an/II, DSM 14204, H8

Species of bacterium

Clostridium frigoris is a Gram-positive, rod-shaped, and spore-forming bacterium from the genus Clostridium. It is a psychrophile, with optimal growth conditions at 5–7 °C.
