= Clostridium aciditolerans =

Scientific classification
- Domain: Bacteria
- Kingdom: Bacillati
- Phylum: Bacillota
- Class: Clostridia
- Order: Eubacteriales
- Family: Clostridiaceae
- Genus: Clostridium
- Species: C. aciditolerans

Binomial name
- Clostridium aciditolerans Lee et al. 2007

Type strain
- ATCC BAA-1220, DSM 17425, JW/YJL-B3

Synonyms
- Clostridium acidotolerans

Species of bacterium

Clostridium aciditolerans is an anaerobic and spore-forming bacterium from the genus Clostridium which has been isolated from wetland sediments from Aiken in the United States.
