= Clostridium algoriphilum =

Scientific classification
- Domain: Bacteria
- Kingdom: Bacillati
- Phylum: Bacillota
- Class: Clostridia
- Order: Eubacteriales
- Family: Clostridiaceae
- Genus: Clostridium
- Species: C. algoriphilum

Binomial name
- Clostridium algoriphilum Shcherbakova et al. 2010

Type strain
- 14D1, DSM 16153, VKM B-2271

Species of bacterium

Clostridium algoriphilum is a psychrophilic, Gram-positive, strict anaerobic, spore-forming and motile bacterium from the genus Clostridium which has been isolated from an over-cooled brine from the permafrost in Kolyma Lowland in Russia.
