= Clostridium leptum =

Scientific classification
- Domain: Bacteria
- Kingdom: Bacillati
- Phylum: Bacillota
- Class: Clostridia
- Order: Eubacteriales
- Family: Clostridiaceae
- Genus: Clostridium
- Species: C. leptum

Binomial name
- Clostridium leptum Moore et al., 1976

Species of bacterium

Clostridium leptum is a species of obligate anaerobic, spore-forming, gram-positive bacteria in the genus Clostridium.

This species forms a subgroup of human fecal microbiota. C. leptum diversity and relative number is reportedly reduced relative to other members of the gut microbiota has been observed in patients with inflammatory bowel disease and ulcerative colitis.

Genomic information
- NCBI ID: 1535
- Ploidy: haploid
- Genome size: 3.27 Mb
- Number of chromosomes: 1

The genome of C. leptum has been sequenced.
