= Clostridium drakei =

Scientific classification
- Domain: Bacteria
- Kingdom: Bacillati
- Phylum: Bacillota
- Class: Clostridia
- Order: Eubacteriales
- Family: Clostridiaceae
- Genus: Clostridium
- Species: C. drakei

Binomial name
- Clostridium drakei Liou et al. 2005

Type strain
- ATCC BAA-623, DSM 12750, SL1

Species of bacterium

Clostridium drakei is a gram-positive, strictly anaerobic bacterium from the genus Clostridium which has been isolated from a coal mine pond in Germany.
