= C. fallax =

C. fallax may refer to:

- Calliphora fallax, a synonym for Calliphora hilli, a fly species
- Chrysopogon fallax, a grass
- Clostridium fallax, an anaerobic motile gram-positive bacterium species
