= Clostridium fimetarium =

Scientific classification
- Domain: Bacteria
- Kingdom: Bacillati
- Phylum: Bacillota
- Class: Clostridia
- Order: Eubacteriales
- Family: Clostridiaceae
- Genus: Clostridium
- Species: C. fimetarium

Binomial name
- Clostridium fimetarium Kotsyurbenko et al. 1997

Type strain
- CIP 105360, DSM 9179, Z-2189

Species of bacterium

Clostridium fimetarium is a Gram-positive, psychroactive, anaerobic and saccharolytic bacterium from the genus Clostridium which has been isolated from cattle manure in Russia.
