= Clostridium cellulosi =

Scientific classification
- Domain: Bacteria
- Kingdom: Bacillati
- Phylum: Bacillota
- Class: Clostridia
- Order: Eubacteriales
- Family: Clostridiaceae
- Genus: Clostridium
- Species: C. cellulosi

Binomial name
- Clostridium cellulosi He et al. 1991

Type strain
- AS 1.1777

Species of bacterium

Clostridium cellulosi is a Gram-negative and cellulolytic bacterium from the genus Clostridium.
