= Clostridium ragsdalei =

Scientific classification
- Domain: Bacteria
- Kingdom: Bacillati
- Phylum: Bacillota
- Class: Clostridia
- Order: Eubacteriales
- Family: Clostridiaceae
- Genus: Clostridium
- Species: "C. ragsdalei"

Binomial name
- "Clostridium ragsdalei" Saxena and Tanner 2011

Species of bacterium

"Clostridium ragsdalei" is an anaerobic, motile, gram-positive bacterium.
