= Clostridium chromiireducens =

Scientific classification
- Domain: Bacteria
- Kingdom: Bacillati
- Phylum: Bacillota
- Class: Clostridia
- Order: Eubacteriales
- Family: Clostridiaceae
- Genus: Clostridium
- Species: C. chromiireducens

Binomial name
- Clostridium chromiireducens Inglett et al. 2011

Type strain
- DSM 23318, GCAF-1, KCTC 5935

Synonyms
- Clostridium chromoreductans

Species of bacterium

Clostridium chromiireducens is a Gram-positive anaerobe anaerobic and spore-forming bacterium from the genus Clostridium which has been isolated from wetland soil from Michigan in the United States.
