= Clostridium sardiniense =

Scientific classification
- Domain: Bacteria
- Kingdom: Bacillati
- Phylum: Bacillota
- Class: Clostridia
- Order: Eubacteriales
- Family: Clostridiaceae
- Genus: Clostridium
- Species: C. sardiniense

Binomial name
- Clostridium sardiniense Prévot 1938

Synonyms
- Clostridium absonum; Clostridium sardiniensis

Species of bacterium

Clostridium sardiniense is an anaerobic Gram-positive bacterium of the genus Clostridium, occurring within the Cluster I Clostridia. The organism actively degrades host mucins when in the gut and produces abundant butyrate while also releasing and producing amino acids. With Clostridium difficile co-infection, C. sardiniense was one of the first commensal species shown to worsen infection through complex metabolic networks of cross-feeding. These mechanisms include the C. sardiniense's fermentation of arginine to release abundant ornithine, release of amino sugars from host mucins, and production of micronutrients, including vitamin B12, folate and riboflavin which the pathogen takes up.
