= Clostridium ganghwense =

Scientific classification
- Domain: Bacteria
- Kingdom: Bacillati
- Phylum: Bacillota
- Class: Clostridia
- Order: Eubacteriales
- Family: Clostridiaceae
- Genus: Clostridium
- Species: C. ganghwense

Binomial name
- Clostridium ganghwense Kim et al. 2006

Type strain
- DSM 18771, IMSNU 40127, JCM 13193, KCTC 5146, HY-42-06

Synonyms
- Clostridium ganghwensis

Species of bacterium

Clostridium ganghwense is a Gram-negative, strictly anaerobic, rod-shaped, spore-forming, halophilic and motile bacterium from the genus Clostridium which has been isolated from tidal flat from the Ganghwa Island in Korea.
