= Clostridium acidisoli =

Scientific classification
- Domain: Bacteria
- Kingdom: Bacillati
- Phylum: Bacillota
- Class: Clostridia
- Order: Eubacteriales
- Family: Clostridiaceae
- Genus: Clostridium
- Species: C. acidisoli

Binomial name
- Clostridium acidisoli Kuhner et al. 2000

Type strain
- ATCC BAA-167, CK74, DSM 12555

Species of bacterium

Clostridium acidisoli is a nitrogen-fixing bacterium from the genus of Clostridium which has been isolated from acidic peat bog soil from the Fichtel Mountains in Germany.
