= Clostridium lacusfryxellense =

Scientific classification
- Domain: Bacteria
- Kingdom: Bacillati
- Phylum: Bacillota
- Class: Clostridia
- Order: Eubacteriales
- Family: Clostridiaceae
- Genus: Clostridium
- Species: C. lacusfryxellense

Binomial name
- Clostridium lacusfryxellense Spring et al. 2003

Type strain
- ATCC BAA-580, C/C-an/B1, DSM 14205, H10

Species of bacterium

Clostridium lacusfryxellense is a psychrophilic, Gram-positive, spore-forming and anaerobic bacterium from the genus Clostridium which has been isolated from a microbial mat from Lake Fryxell in Antarctica. The species name is derived from the lake it was first isolated from. C. lacusfryxellense is motile through peritrichous flagella. Cells produce round endosphores that can be found terminally and subterminally. The species requires cold temperatures for growth, with an optimum growth temperature of 8-12 °C.
