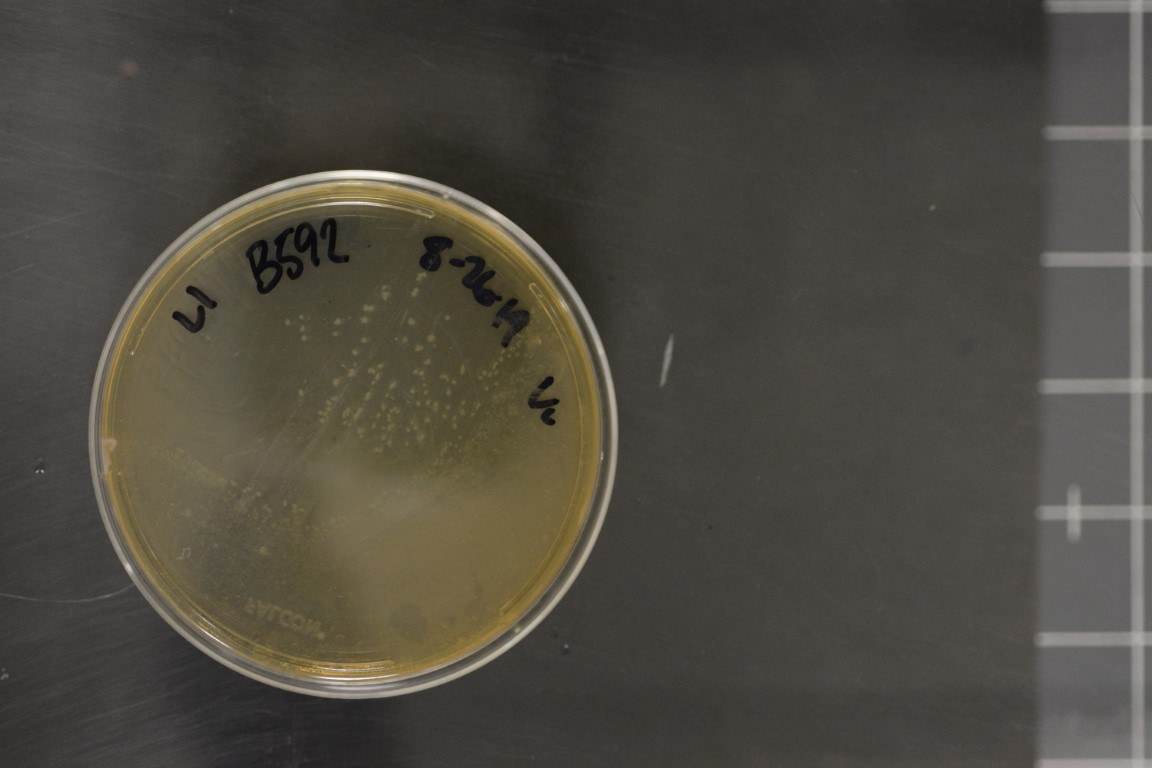

Scientific classification
- Domain: Bacteria
- Kingdom: Bacillati
- Phylum: Bacillota
- Class: Clostridia
- Order: Eubacteriales
- Family: Clostridiaceae
- Genus: Clostridium
- Species: C. beijerinckii

Binomial name
- Clostridium beijerinckii Donker 1926 (Approved Lists 1980)

Synonyms
- Clostridium diolis

= Clostridium beijerinckii =

Species of bacterium

Clostridium beijerinckii is a gram positive, rod shaped, motile bacterium of the genus Clostridium. It has been isolated from feces and soil. It produces oval to subterminal spores. It is named after Martinus Beijerinck, who is a Dutch bacteriologist.

It is of commercial interest for its ability to produce butanol, acetone and/or isopropanol at strictly anaerobic conditions at 37 °C, using a wide range of substrates including (but not limited to) pentoses, hexoses and starch. Other advantages of this bacterium include its ability to grow in simple, inexpensive media, stability in regard to strain degeneration, good adaptability to continuous processes and sustained production of solvents well into the log phase.

Recent developments have shown it is a potential candidate for efficient hydrogen production.

== See also ==
- Clostridium acetobutylicum
- Butanol
- A.B.E. process
