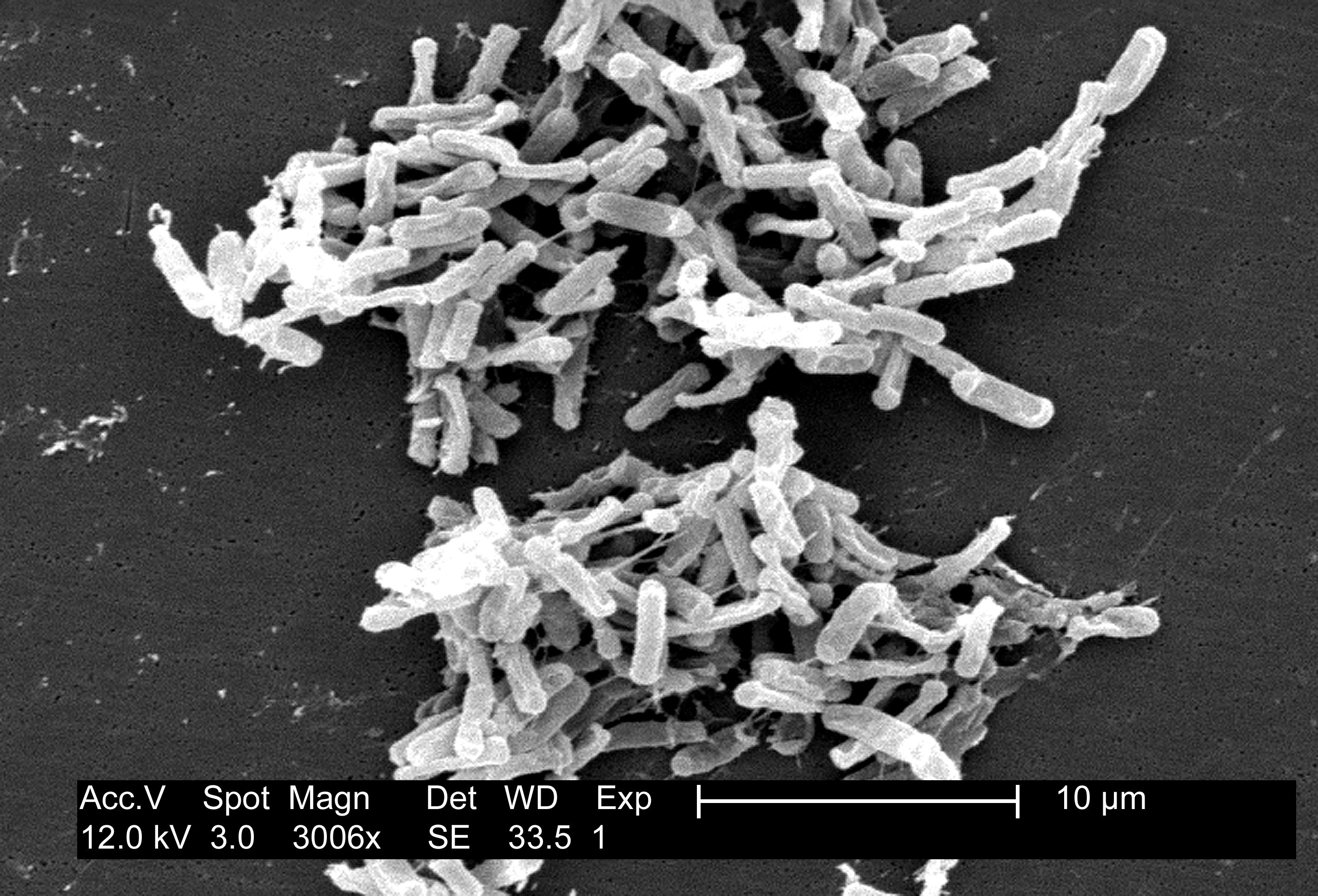
- SE micrograph of Clostridioides difficile colonies from a stool sample

Scientific classification
- Domain: Bacteria
- Kingdom: Bacillati
- Phylum: Bacillota
- Class: Clostridia
- Order: Peptostreptococcales
- Family: Peptostreptococcaceae
- Genus: Clostridioides; Lawson and Rainey 2016

Type species
- Clostridioides difficile (Hall & O'Toole 1935) Lawson et al. 2016

Species
- C. difficile

Synonyms
- "Peptoclostridium" Yutin & Galperin 2013 non Galperin et al. 2016 non Donker 1926

= Clostridioides =

Genus of bacteria

Clostridioides is a genus of Gram-positive bacteria, which includes Clostridioides difficile, a human pathogen causing an infectious diarrhea.

== Taxonomy ==
The genus Clostridioides was created to describe a few species formerly in the genus Clostridium which have been shown to be their own genetically distinct genus using 16S rRNA gene sequencing analysis. However, both names are still in use and valid under the International Code of Nomenclature of Prokaryotes. Since C. mangenotii was further separated into a distinct genus in 2024, Clostridioides is a monotypic genus.

== Description ==
They are obligate anaerobes capable of producing endospores. The normal, reproducing cells of Clostridioides, called the vegetative form, are rod-shaped, which gives them their name, from the Greek κλωστήρ or spindle. Clostridioides endospores, like Clostridium endospores, have a distinct bowling pin or bottle shape, distinguishing them from other bacterial endospores, which are usually ovoid in shape.

== See also ==
- List of bacterial orders
- List of bacteria genera
