= Clostridium diolis =

Scientific classification
- Domain: Bacteria
- Kingdom: Bacillati
- Phylum: Bacillota
- Class: Clostridia
- Order: Eubacteriales
- Family: Clostridiaceae
- Genus: Clostridium
- Species: C. diolis

Binomial name
- Clostridium diolis Biebl and Spröer 2003

Type strain
- 88-273, ATCC BAA-557, Biebl SH1, CIP 107836, DSM 15410, DSM 5431, SH1, VTT E-032442

Synonyms
- Clostridium diolicum

Species of bacterium

Clostridium diolis is a bacterium from the genus Clostridium which has been isolated from decaying straw in Braunschweig in Germany. Clostridium diolis produces 1,3-propanediol.
