= Anaerocolumna aminovalerica =

Scientific classification
- Domain: Bacteria
- Kingdom: Bacillati
- Phylum: Bacillota
- Class: Clostridia
- Order: Eubacteriales
- Family: Lachnospiraceae
- Genus: Anaerocolumna
- Species: A. aminovalerica

Binomial name
- Anaerocolumna aminovalerica (Hardman and Stadtman 1960) Ueki et al. 2016

Synonyms
- Clostridium aminovalericum

Species of bacteria

Anaerocolumna aminovalerica is a species of bacteria belonging to the family Lachnospiraceae.
