= Acetone–butanol–ethanol fermentation =

Chemical process

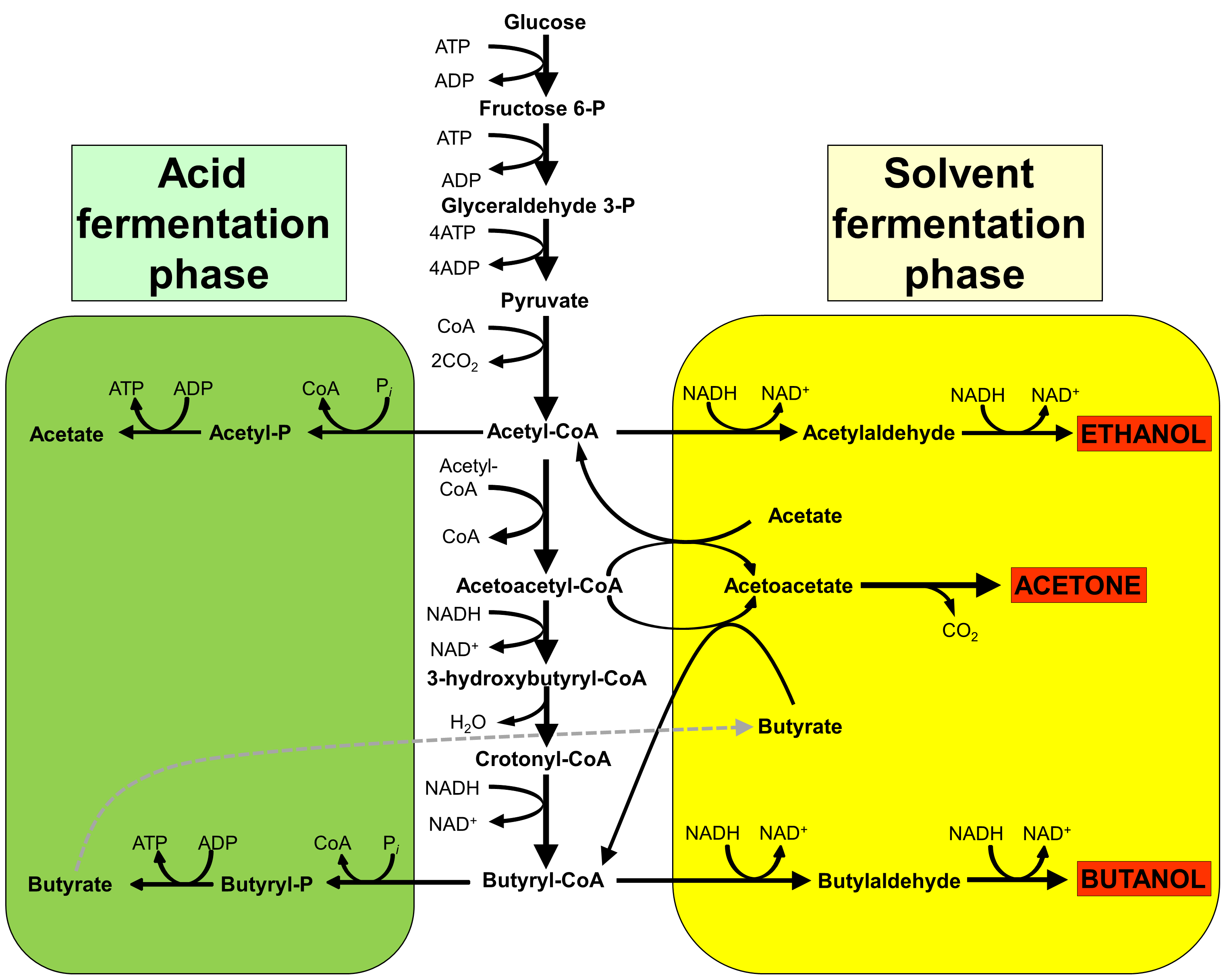
Pathway of acetone–butanol–ethanol fermentation by clostridia. Note: The steps between Glyceraldehyde 3-P and Pyruvate yield 4 ATP from 4 ADP, not the inverse as depicted here

Acetone–butanol–ethanol fermentation (ABE fermentation), also known as the Weizmann process, is a process that uses bacterial fermentation to produce acetone, n-butanol, and ethanol from carbohydrates such as starch and glucose. It was developed by chemist Chaim Weizmann and was the primary process used to produce acetone, which was needed to make cordite, a substance essential for the British war industry during World War I.

== Process ==
The process may be likened to how yeast ferments sugars to produce ethanol for wine, beer, or fuel, but the organisms that carry out the ABE fermentation are strictly anaerobic (obligate anaerobes). The ABE fermentation produces solvents in a ratio of 3 parts acetone, 6 parts butanol to 1 part ethanol. It usually uses a strain of bacteria from class Clostridia (family Clostridiaceae). Clostridium acetobutylicum is the most well-studied and widely used. Although less effective, Clostridium beijerinckii and Clostridium saccharobutylicum bacterial strains have shown good results as well.

The ABE fermentation pathway generally proceeds in two phases. In the initial acidogenesis phase, the cells grow exponentially and accumulate acetate and butyrate. The low pH along with other factors then trigger a metabolic shift to the solventogenesis phase, in which acetate and butyrate are used to produce the solvents.

For gas stripping, the most common gases used are the off-gases from the fermentation itself, a mixture of carbon dioxide and hydrogen gas.

== History ==
The production of butanol by biological means was first performed by Louis Pasteur in 1861. In 1905, Austrian biochemist Franz Schardinger found that acetone could similarly be produced. In 1910 Auguste Fernbach (1860–1939) developed a bacterial fermentation process using potato starch as a feedstock in the production of butanol.

Industrial exploitation of ABE fermentation started in 1916, during World War I, with Chaim Weizmann's isolation of Clostridium acetobutylicum, as described in U.S. patent 1315585.

The Weizmann process was operated by Commercial Solvents Corporation from about 1920 to 1964 with plants in the US (Terre Haute, IN, and Peoria, IL), and Liverpool, England. The Peoria plant was the largest of the three. It used molasses as feedstock and had 96 fermenters with a volume of 96,000 gallons each.

After World War II, ABE fermentation became generally non-profitable, compared to the production of the same three solvents (acetone, butanol, ethanol) from petroleum. During the 1950s and 1960s, ABE fermentation was replaced by petroleum chemical plants. Due to different raw material costs, ABE fermentation was viable in South Africa until the early 1980s, with the last plant closing in 1983. Green Biologics Ltd operated the last attempt to resurrect the process at scale but the plant closed in Minnesota in June 2019.

A new ABE biorefinery has been developed in Scotland by Celtic Renewables Ltd and began production in 2023. The key difference in the process is the use of low value spent materials or residues from other processes removing the variable costs of raw feedstock crops and materials.

=== Improvement attempts ===
The most critical aspect in biomass fermentation processes is related to its productivity. The ABE fermentation via Clostridium beijerinckii or Clostridium acetobutylicum for instance is characterized by product inhibition. This means that there is a product concentration threshold that cannot be overcome, resulting in a product stream highly diluted in water.

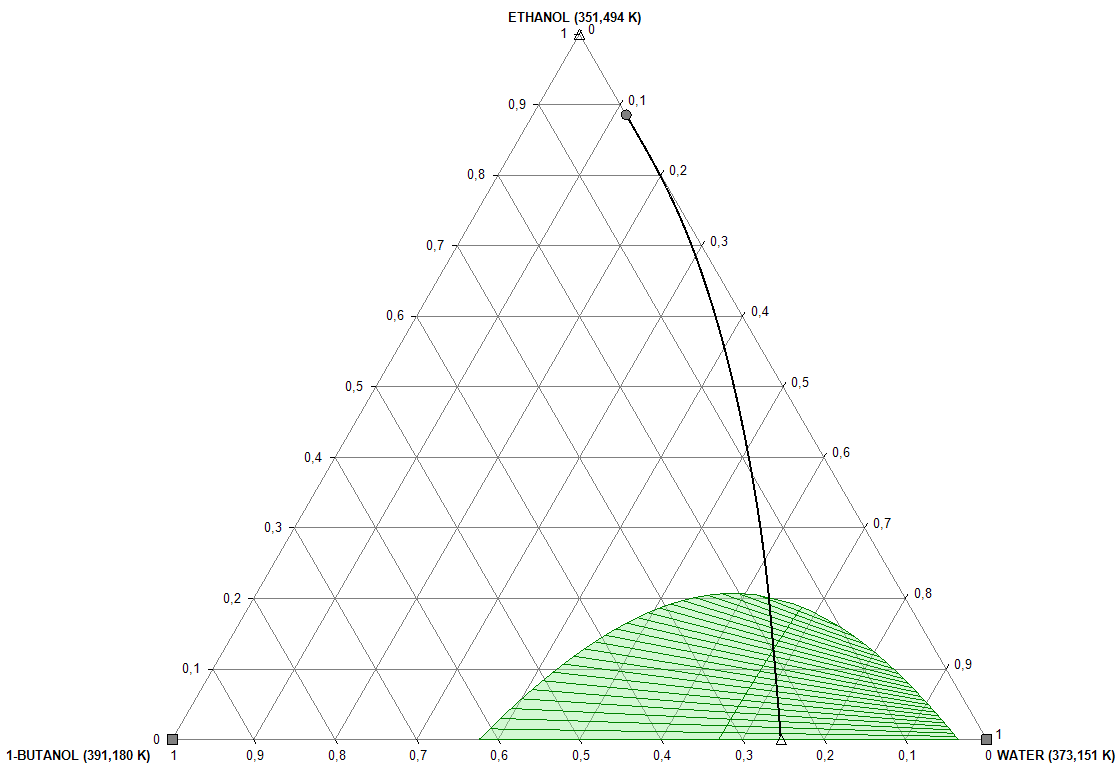
Phase equilibrium diagram for 1-butanol–ethanol–water ternary mixture

For this reason, in order to have a comparable productivity and profitability with respect to the petrochemical processes, cost and energy effective solutions for the product purification sections are required to provide a significant product recovery at the desired purity. The main solutions adopted during the last decades have been as follows:

- The employment of less expensive raw materials, and in particular lignocellulosic waste or algae;
- The microorganisms modifications or the research of new strains less sensitive to the butanol concentration poisoning to increase productivity and selectivity towards the butanol species;
- The fermentation reactor optimization aimed at increasing the productivity;
- The reduction of the energy costs of the separation and purification downstream processing and, in particular, to carry out the separation in-situ in the reactor;
- The use of side products such as hydrogen and carbon dioxide, solid wastes and discharged microorganisms and carry out less expensive process wastewater treatments.

In the second half of the 20th century, these technologies allowed an increase in the final product concentration in the broth from 15 to 30 g/L, an increase in the final productivity from 0.46 to 4.6 g/(L*h) and an increase in the yield from 15 to 42%.

From a compound purification perspective, the main criticalities in the ABE/W product recovery are due to the water–alcohol mixture's non-ideal interactions leading to homogeneous and heterogeneous azeotropic species, as shown by the ternary equilibrium diagram. This causes the separation by standard distillation to be particularly impractical but, on the other hand, allows the exploitation of the liquid–liquid demixing region both for analogous and alternative separation processes.

Therefore, in order to enhance the ABE fermentation yield, mainly in situ product recovery systems have been developed. These include gas stripping, pervaporation, liquid–liquid extraction, distillation via Dividing Wall Column, membrane distillation, membrane separation, adsorption, and reverse osmosis. Green Biologics Ltd. implemented many of these technologies at an industrial scale.

Moreover, differently from crude oil feedstocks, biomasses nature fluctuates over the year's seasons and according to the geographical location. For this reasons, biorefinery operations need not only to be effective but also to be flexible and to be able to switch between two operating conditions rather quickly.[citation needed]

=== Current perspectives ===
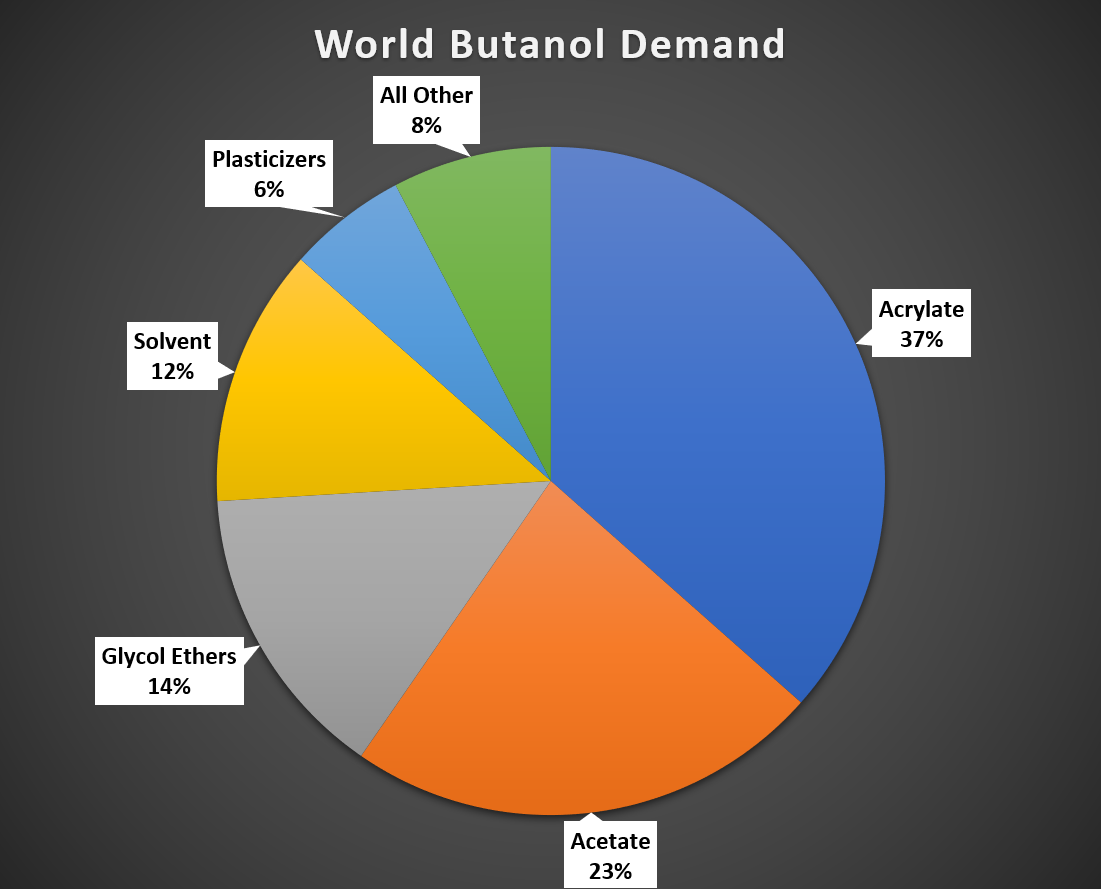
Global n-butanol demand

ABE fermentation is attracting renewed interest with a focus on butanol as a renewable biofuel.

Sustainability is by far the topic of major concern over the last years. The energy challenge is the key point of the environmental friendly policies adopted by all the most developed and industrialized countries worldwide. For this purpose Horizon 2020, the biggest EU Research and Innovation programme, was funded by the European Union over the 2014–2020 period.

The International Energy Agency defines renewables as the centre of the transition to a less carbon-intensive and more sustainable energy system. Biofuels are believed to represent around 30% of energy consumption in transport by 2060. Their role is particularly important in sectors which are difficult to decarbonise, such as aviation, shipping and other long-haul transport. That is why several bioprocesses have seen a renewed interest in recent years, both from a research and an industrial perspective.

For this reason, the ABE fermentation process has been reconsidered from a different perspective. Although it was originally conceived to produce acetone, it is considered as a suitable production pathway for biobutanol that has become the product of major interest. Biogenic butanol is a possible substitute of bioethanol or even better and it is already employed both as fuel additive and as pure fuel instead of standard gasoline because, differently from ethanol, it can be directly and efficiently used in gasoline engines. Moreover, it has the advantage that it can be shipped and distributed through existing pipelines and filling stations.

Finally biobutanol is widely used as a direct solvent for paints, coatings, varnishes, resins, dyes, camphor, vegetable oils, fats, waxes, shellac, rubbers and alkaloids due to its higher energy density, lower volatility, and lower hygroscopicity. It can be produced from different kinds of cellulosic biomass and can be used for further processing of advanced biofuels such as butyl levulinate as well.

The application of n-butanol in the production of butyl acrylate has a wide scope for its expansion, which in turn would help in increasing the consumption of n-butanol globally. Butyl acrylate was the biggest n-butanol application in 2014 and is projected to be worth US$3.9 billion by 2020.
