= Clostridium uliginosum =

Scientific classification
- Domain: Bacteria
- Kingdom: Bacillati
- Phylum: Bacillota
- Class: Clostridia
- Order: Eubacteriales
- Family: Clostridiaceae
- Genus: Clostridium
- Species: C. uliginosum

Binomial name
- Clostridium uliginosum Matthies et al. 2001

Species of bacterium

Clostridium uliginosum is a mesophilic bacterium oxidizing acetate in syntrophic association with a hydrogenotrophic methanogenic bacterium. It is a spore-forming, gram-positive, rod-shaped organism, with type strain BST. Its genome has been sequenced.
