= Clostridium carboxidivorans =

Scientific classification
- Domain: Bacteria
- Kingdom: Bacillati
- Phylum: Bacillota
- Class: Clostridia
- Order: Eubacteriales
- Family: Clostridiaceae
- Genus: Clostridium
- Species: C. carboxidivorans

Binomial name
- Clostridium carboxidivorans Liou et al. 2005

Type strain
- ATCC BAA-624, DSM 15243, P7

Species of bacterium

Clostridium carboxidivorans is a Gram-positive anaerobic, spore-forming and motile bacterium from the genus Clostridium which has been isolated from an agricultural lagoon in Oklahoma in the United States.

Clostridium carboxidivorans is capable of fermenting carbon monoxide, hydrogen, and carbon dioxide, and produce ethanol, butanol and hexanol as end-products. C. carboxidivorans does this using the wood-ljungdahl pathway.
