= Clostridium amazonense =

Scientific classification
- Domain: Bacteria
- Kingdom: Bacillati
- Phylum: Bacillota
- Class: Clostridia
- Order: Eubacteriales
- Family: Clostridiaceae
- Genus: Clostridium
- Species: C. amazonense

Binomial name
- Clostridium amazonense O et al. 2015

Type strain
- CCUG 59712, NE08V, DSM 23598

Synonyms
- Clostridium edenense

Species of bacterium

Clostridium amazonense is a Gram-positive, strictly anaerobic, rod-shaped and spore-forming bacterium from the genus Clostridium which has been isolated from human feces in Nuevo Eden in Peru.
