= Clostridium cadaveris =

Scientific classification
- Domain: Bacteria
- Kingdom: Bacillati
- Phylum: Bacillota
- Class: Clostridia
- Order: Eubacteriales
- Family: Clostridiaceae
- Genus: Clostridium
- Species: C. cadaveris

Binomial name
- Clostridium cadaveris (Klein 1899) McClung and McCoy 1957

Synonyms
- Bacillus cadaveris Klein 1899; Plectridium cadaveris (Klein 1899) Prevot 1938

Species of bacterium

Clostridium cadaveris is an enteric, gas-forming, motile, strictly anaerobic gram-positive bacterium of the genus Clostridium. First described by Klein in 1899, it was noted to be the most prominent bacteria during human decomposition; historically it was described as "putrefying flora".

Clostridium cadaveris is usually considered non-pathogenic; unlike other species of Clostridium, it does not produce toxins. Clostridium cadaveris is found in soil, water, and is a normal component of the human intestinal tract.

The genus Clostridium is large and phylogenetically diverse, comprising over 150 species. Clostridia are found extensively in nature predominantly as benign soil saprophytes. A number of Clostridium species are pathogenic to humans. Members including C. botulinium, C. perfringens, and C. septicum are spore-forming and the cause of botulism and gas gangrene respectively. Clostridium cadaveris is closely related phylogenetically to Clostridium fallax and Clostridium intestinale.

Infections in humans due to C. cadaveris are rare and the organism is seldom found is clinical specimens. Most cases reported in medical literature document infections in immunocompromised patients, but isolated cases in immunocompetent hosts have been reported.

== Colony characteristics ==
Primary isolation media is blood agar incubated anaerobically at 35–37 degrees Celsius for 40–48 hours. Microscopic appearance shows gram-positive rods with both smooth and rough colony types and further spore staining technique may be utilized to determine spore shape and position. Currently the standard to identify clostridial species such as C. cadaveris is via molecular techniques utilizing ribosomal RNA gene sequencing.

== Infections ==
Infections due to C. cadaveris are rare and present predominantly as bacteremia of gastro-intestinal origin and may occur endogenously. Associated risk factors for bacteremia due to C. cadaveris include a compromised immune system, trauma, recent surgical procedures, diabetes, and perforated bowel. Bacteremia and sepsis caused by C. cadaveris have been implicated following orthopedic procedures, in patients undergoing oncological treatment, and in cases of necrotic decubitus. Due to the rare clinical manifestation of bacteremia attributed to C. cadaveris, the organism's susceptibility to antibiotic treatment is not well documented. Case reports indicate a susceptibility to most antibiotics including metronidazole and penicillin as well as resistance to clindamycin and possibly beta-lactams. Infections may be persistent due to the organisms ability to sporulate.

== In human decomposition ==
In humans, one of the first signs of decomposition is a yellow-green discolorization of the abdomen in the area of the cecum due to the build up of gases from bacteria and autolysis of cells. Clostridium cadaveris, C. welchii, E. coli, and B. aerogenes are found in large numbers after death due to nutrient supply for anaerobic bacteria allowing for optimal organismal growth. In initial stages of decomposition bacteria feed on both intestinal contents and intestinal tissues, prolific colonization occurs allowing digestive enzymes and anaerobic bacteria such as C. cadaveris to breach the intestinal tract invading other tissues and organs. Translocation and proliferation of gut flora such as C. cadaveris allow for these organisms to serve as bacterial indicators for time of death in individuals.
