= Clostridium fallax =

Scientific classification
- Domain: Bacteria
- Kingdom: Bacillati
- Phylum: Bacillota
- Class: Clostridia
- Order: Eubacteriales
- Family: Clostridiaceae
- Genus: Clostridium
- Species: C. fallax

Binomial name
- Clostridium fallax (Weinberg and Séguin 1915) Bergey et al. 1923

Species of bacterium

Clostridium fallax is a species of obligate anaerobic, motile, gram-positive bacterium from the order Eubacteriales. The species was formally described in 1923.
