= Clostridium tyrobutyricum =

Scientific classification
- Domain: Bacteria
- Kingdom: Bacillati
- Phylum: Bacillota
- Class: Clostridia
- Order: Eubacteriales
- Family: Clostridiaceae
- Genus: Clostridium
- Species: C. tyrobutyricum

Binomial name
- Clostridium tyrobutyricum van Beynum and Pette 1935

Species of bacterium

Clostridium tyrobutyricum is a rod-shaped, Gram-positive bacterium that grows under anaerobic conditions and produces butyric acid, acetic acid and hydrogen gas as the major fermentation products from glucose and xylose.

== The late-blowing defect in cheese ==
Clostridium tyrobutyricum spores present in raw milk ferments lactate causing the "late-blowing" defect in high-pH cheeses such as Emmentaler, Gouda or Edammer. Even low spore densities of this anaerobe in milk used for cheese production can bring about this phenomenon, if the growth conditions are suitable. This defect is characterized by eyes, slits, and cracks caused by the production of the gas bubbles as well as abnormal cheese flavor from the Butyric acid. This defect can create considerable loss of product.
