= Intestinibacter bartlettii =

Scientific classification
- Domain: Bacteria
- Kingdom: Bacillati
- Phylum: Bacillota
- Class: Clostridia
- Order: Eubacteriales
- Family: Clostridiaceae
- Genus: Intestinibacter
- Species: I. bartlettii

Binomial name
- Intestinibacter bartlettii (Song et al. 2004) Gerritsen et al. 2014

Synonyms
- Clostridium bartlettii

Species of bacterium

Intestinibacter bartlettii is a species of bacteria belonging to the family Clostridiaceae and the only described species in the genus Intestinibacter.
