= Anaeromicropila populeti =

Scientific classification
- Domain: Bacteria
- Kingdom: Bacillati
- Phylum: Bacillota
- Class: Clostridia
- Order: Eubacteriales
- Family: Lachnospiraceae
- Genus: Anaeromicropila
- Species: A. populeti

Binomial name
- Anaeromicropila populeti (Sleat and Mah 1985) Ueki et al. 2023

Synonyms
- Clostridium populeti

Species of bacterium

Anaeromicropila populeti is a bacterium of the family Lachnospiraceae.
