= Clostridium paraputrificum =

Scientific classification
- Domain: Bacteria
- Kingdom: Bacillati
- Phylum: Bacillota
- Class: Clostridia
- Order: Eubacteriales
- Family: Clostridiaceae
- Genus: Clostridium
- Species: C. paraputrificum

Binomial name
- Clostridium paraputrificum (Bienstock 1906) Snyder 1936

Species of bacterium

Clostridium paraputrificum is an anaerobic, motile, gram-positive bacterium.
