= Clostridium saccharoperbutylacetonicum =

Scientific classification
- Domain: Bacteria
- Kingdom: Bacillati
- Phylum: Bacillota
- Class: Clostridia
- Order: Eubacteriales
- Family: Clostridiaceae
- Genus: Clostridium
- Species: C. saccharoperbutylacetonicum

Binomial name
- Clostridium saccharoperbutylacetonicum Keis et al. 2001

Species of bacterium

Clostridium saccharoperbutylacetonicum is an indole and notably butanol-producing bacterium, with the type strain N1-4 (HMT) (= ATCC 27021^{T}). Its genome has been sequenced.
