= Clostridium baratii =

Scientific classification
- Domain: Bacteria
- Kingdom: Bacillati
- Phylum: Bacillota
- Class: Clostridia
- Order: Eubacteriales
- Family: Clostridiaceae
- Genus: Clostridium
- Species: C. baratii

Binomial name
- Clostridium baratii (Prévot 1938) Holdeman and Moore 1970

Synonyms
- "Acuformis perennis" Prévot 1940; Clostridium barati (Prévot 1938) Holdeman and Moore 1970; Clostridium perenne (Prévot 1940) McClung and McCoy 1957; Clostridium paraperfringens Nakamura et al. 1970; "Inflabilis barati" Prévot 1938

Species of bacterium

Clostridium baratii is an anaerobic, motile, gram-positive bacterium. It is a rare cause of infant botulism, in which newborns or infants lose their muscle tone, and develop trouble feeding due to a difficulty in breathing, which can be fatal. Newborns can recover spontaneously or as in two known cases improve with injected botulism antitoxin. As of 2015, the environmental source of this bacterium is unknown, despite extensive investigations when cases have occurred. It is named after Barat who is a French bacteriologist.

== Diagnosis ==
The diagnosis must be suspected based on the constellation of symptoms. Clostridium baratii infection is proven when it is grown on a petri dish and isolated from a stool culture. This takes a minimum of 48 hours and more, because the bacterium needs to grow in the absence of oxygen, that is under anaerobic conditions.

== Symptoms and signs of infection ==
Newborns symptoms are that they develop constipation, are fussy, and feed poorly. Signs of the disease reported by caregivers are "excessive crying, reluctance to suck, and difficulty in swallowing milk". Within hours an infant can become less responsive to stimuli and "floppy", that is its muscle tone diminishes.

== Epidemiology ==
The CDC reported in 2015, that through 2013, only 14 cases of C. baratii type F infant botulism had been reported in the United States. As opposed to the classic cause of botulism, C. botulinum, its environmental source is unknown. Therefore, it is unclear how to prevention infection. When very young infants become floppy and their breathing fails (progressive respiratory failure) health care practitioners should consider this disease as a possible diagnosis.
