= Ruminiclostridium cellobioparum =

Scientific classification
- Domain: Bacteria
- Kingdom: Bacillati
- Phylum: Bacillota
- Class: Clostridia
- Order: Oscillospirales
- Family: Oscillospiraceae
- Genus: Ruminiclostridium
- Species: R. cellobioparum

Binomial name
- Ruminiclostridium cellobioparum (Hungate 1944) Zhang et al. 2018

Synonyms
- Clostridium cellobioparum; Clostridium termitidis

Species of bacterium

Ruminiclostridium cellobioparum is a species of anaerobic cellulose-degrading Gram-positive bacterium found in the bovine rumen belonging to the family Oscillospiraceae.
