= Thomasclavelia cocleata =

Scientific classification
- Domain: Bacteria
- Kingdom: Bacillati
- Phylum: Bacillota
- Class: Erysipelotrichia
- Order: Erysipelotrichales
- Family: Coprobacillaceae
- Genus: Thomasclavelia
- Species: T. cocleata

Binomial name
- Thomasclavelia cocleata (Kaneuchi et al. 1979) Lawson et al. 2023

Type strain
- ATCC 29902, BCRC 14465, C. Kaneuchi CH2-3, C. Kaneuchi I50, CCM 6166, CCRC 14465, CCUG 45854, CCUG 46310, DSM 1551, I50, JCM 1397, NCTC 11210

Synonyms
- Clostridium cocleatum

Species of bacterium

Thomasclavelia cocleata is a Gram-positive and anaerobic bacterium from the family Coprobacillaceae which has been isolated from the caecal content of a mouse in Miyazaki in Japan.
