= Clostridium saccharobutylicum =

Scientific classification
- Domain: Bacteria
- Kingdom: Bacillati
- Phylum: Bacillota
- Class: Clostridia
- Order: Eubacteriales
- Family: Clostridiaceae
- Genus: Clostridium
- Species: C. saccharobutylicum

Binomial name
- Clostridium saccharobutylicum Keis et al. 2001

Species of bacterium

Clostridium saccharobutylicum is an indole and notably acetone, butanol and ethanol-producing bacterium, with type strain DSM 13864^{T} (= ATCC BAA-117^{T}). Its genome has been sequenced.
