= Ruminiclostridium hungatei =

Scientific classification
- Domain: Bacteria
- Kingdom: Bacillati
- Phylum: Bacillota
- Class: Clostridia
- Order: Oscillospirales
- Family: Oscillospiraceae
- Genus: Ruminiclostridium
- Species: R. hungatei

Binomial name
- Ruminiclostridium hungatei (Monserrate et al. 2001) Zhang et al. 2018

Type strain
- AD, ATCC 700212, DSM 14427, KCTC 12929

Synonyms
- Clostridium hungatei

Species of bacterium

Ruminiclostridium hungatei is an obligately anaerobic, cellulolytic, mesophilic and nitrogen fixing bacterium from the genus of Clostridium which has been isolated from soil in Amherst in the United States.
