= Thomasclavelia saccharogumia =

Scientific classification
- Domain: Bacteria
- Kingdom: Bacillati
- Phylum: Bacillota
- Class: Erysipelotrichia
- Order: Erysipelotrichales
- Family: Coprobacillaceae
- Genus: Thomasclavelia
- Species: T. saccharogumia

Binomial name
- Thomasclavelia saccharogumia (Clavel et al. 2007) Lawson et al. 2023

Synonyms
- Clostridium saccharogumia

Species of bacterium

Thomasclavelia saccharogumia is a bacterium of the family Coprobacillaceae.
