= Schnuerera ultunensis =

Scientific classification
- Domain: Bacteria
- Kingdom: Bacillati
- Phylum: Bacillota
- Class: Clostridia
- Order: Tissierellales
- Family: Tissierellaceae
- Genus: Schnuerera
- Species: S. ultunensis

Binomial name
- Schnuerera ultunensis (Schnürer et al. 1996) Lawson 2020

Synonyms
- Clostridium ultunense Schnürer et al. 1996

Species of bacterium

Schnuerera ultunensis is a bacterium from the family Tissierellaceae.
