= Thermoanaerobacterium thermosaccharolyticum =

Scientific classification
- Domain: Bacteria
- Kingdom: Bacillati
- Phylum: Bacillota
- Class: Clostridia
- Order: Thermoanaerobacterales
- Family: Thermoanaerobacteraceae
- Genus: Thermoanaerobacterium
- Species: T. thermosaccharolyticum

Binomial name
- Thermoanaerobacterium thermosaccharolyticum (McClung 1935) Collins et al. 1994

Synonyms
- Clostridium thermosaccharolyticum McClung 1935

Species of bacterium

Thermoanaerobacterium thermosaccharolyticum, previously known as Clostridium thermosaccharolyticum, is a bacterium belonging to the Bacillota. It is an anaerobic, motile, gram-positive bacterium.

== Bibliography ==
- "Clostridium thermosaccharolyticum: (McClung 1935) Collins et al. 1994". National Center for Biotechnology Information (NCBI).
- UniProt. "Clostridium thermosaccharolyticum".
