= Metaclostridioides mangenotii =

Scientific classification
- Domain: Bacteria
- Kingdom: Bacillati
- Phylum: Bacillota
- Class: Clostridia
- Order: Peptostreptococcales
- Family: Peptostreptococcaceae
- Genus: Metaclostridioides
- Species: M. mangenotii

Binomial name
- Metaclostridioides mangenotii (Prévot and Zimmès-Chaverou 1947) Bello et al. 2024

Synonyms
- Clostridium mangenotii (Prévot and Zimmès-Chaverou 1947) McClung and McCoy 1957; Clostrioides mangenotii (Prévot and Zimmès-Chaverou 1947) Lawson et al. 2016; Inflabilis mangenoti Prévot and Zimmès-Chaverou 1947

Species of bacterium

Metaclostridioides mangenotii is a bacterial species in the genus Metaclostridioides within the family Peptostreptococcaceae.
