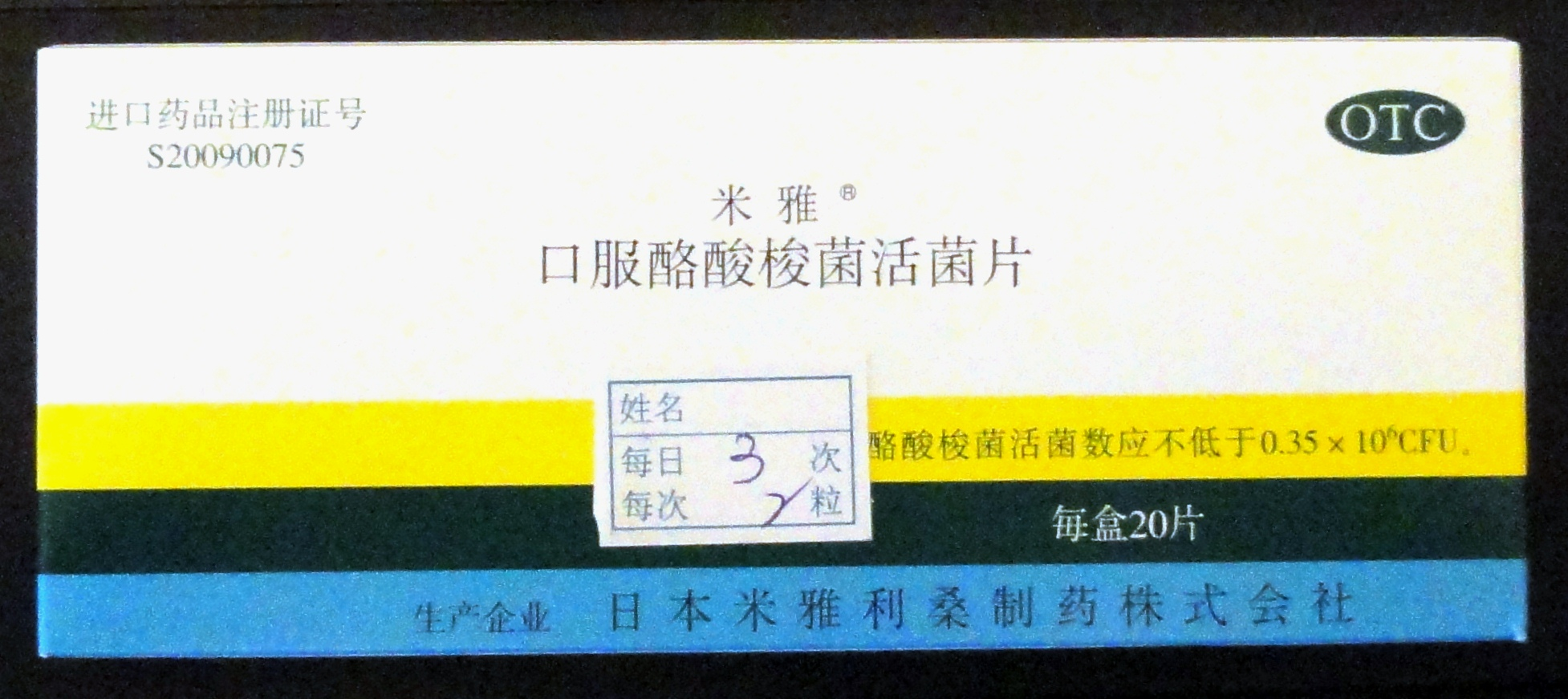
- C. butyricum MIYAIRI 588 tablets produced by Miyarisan Pharmaceutical, Tokyo, Japan (Chinese OTC packaging).

Scientific classification
- Domain: Bacteria
- Kingdom: Bacillati
- Phylum: Bacillota
- Class: Clostridia
- Order: Eubacteriales
- Family: Clostridiaceae
- Genus: Clostridium
- Species: C. butyricum

Binomial name
- Clostridium butyricum Prazmowski 1880 (Approved Lists 1980)

= Clostridium butyricum =

Species of bacterium

Clostridium butyricum is a strictly anaerobic endospore-forming Gram-positive butyric acid–producing bacillus subsisting by means of fermentation using an intracellularly accumulated amylopectin-like α-polyglucan (granulose) as a substrate. This species is infrequently reported as a human pathogen and is widely used as a probiotic in Japan, Korea, and China. C. butyricum is a soil inhabitant in various parts of the world, has been cultured from the stool of healthy children and adults, and is common in soured milk and cheeses. The connection with dairy products is shown by the name, the butyr- in butyricum reflects the relevance of butyric acid in the bacteria's metabolism and the connection with Latin butyrum and Greek βούτυρον, with word roots pertaining to butter and cheese.

== Industrial relevance ==
The study of fermentation in the 19th century was of interest not only to basic science but also as applied science funded by companies in certain industries, principally winemaking and brewing, as a means to reduce risk of bad batches through greater understanding and control of the process. Thus, early microbiologists such as Louis Pasteur were funded in their research into microbial metabolism and biochemistry. Such research led to the first understanding of anaerobic metabolism, and butyric acid fermentation was humans' initial window into that world. In 1880, Adam Prażmowski from the University of Leipzig first assigned the binomial name Clostridium butyricum.

== Therapeutic uses ==
The first C. butyricum MIYAIRI strain was isolated by Dr. Chikaji Miyairi from feces in Japan in 1933. In 1963, CBM 588 was isolated from a soil sample in Nagano, Japan. Preparations based on CBM 588 have a long history of safe use in human populations in Japan, where such products are variously classed as pharmaceutical drugs, "quasi drugs", and OTC (Over The Counter) probiotics. The safe therapeutic use of CBM 588 in humans populations is supported by various peer-reviewed publications and case studies, including reports of CBM 588 use in severely-ill, immunocompromised, and hospitalized patients, as well as in pregnant women.

C. butyrcum’s usefulness stems primarily from its ability to interfere with the growth of highly pathogenic Clostridioides difficile by antagonizing its multiplication. This species is often used in Japanese hospitals for C. difficile prophylaxis among in-patients and, particularly, during administration of certain antibiotics (i.e. Levofloxacin) associated with opportunistic C. difficile infection.

CBM 588 was approved for clinical use in humans by the Japanese Ministry of Health and Welfare in 1970. The standard preparation as marketed by Miyarisan Pharmaceutical (Tokyo, Japan) consists of white, marked tablets each containing 0.35 million colony forming units (CFU) of C. butyricum MIYAIRI 588 (as active agent). CBM 588 does not establish permanently in the gut, in common with other orally administered probiotic bacteria. CBM 588 for clinical use is produced by submerged anaerobic fermentation followed by centrifugation, drying, blending and packaging.

The MIYAIRI 588 strain of C. butyricum does not carry any genes encoding any toxins and virulence factors associated with Clostridium or other enteropathogens. Absence of neurotoxin production has been demonstrated by polymerase chain reaction (PCR) and Southern blot hybridisation for type E botulinum toxin gene. The absence of genes encoding botulinum neurotoxin A,B,F and genes encoding non-toxic haemagglutinin (NTNH) and genes encoding Clostridium perfringens toxins (alpha, beta, epsilon and iota) has been demonstrated by PCR assay.

This strain is deposited at the Fermentation Research Institute, Agency of Industrial Science and Technology, Japan under the strain name Clostridium butyricum MIYAIRI 588 strain, deposit number FERM BP-2789. Recent European Food Safety Authority opinions confirm the official strain nomenclature as Clostridium butyricum FERM BP-2789.

In addition, other C. butyricum strains have been discovered, including RH2, S-45-5, UBCB 70, and CGMCC0313, and used in different fields.
