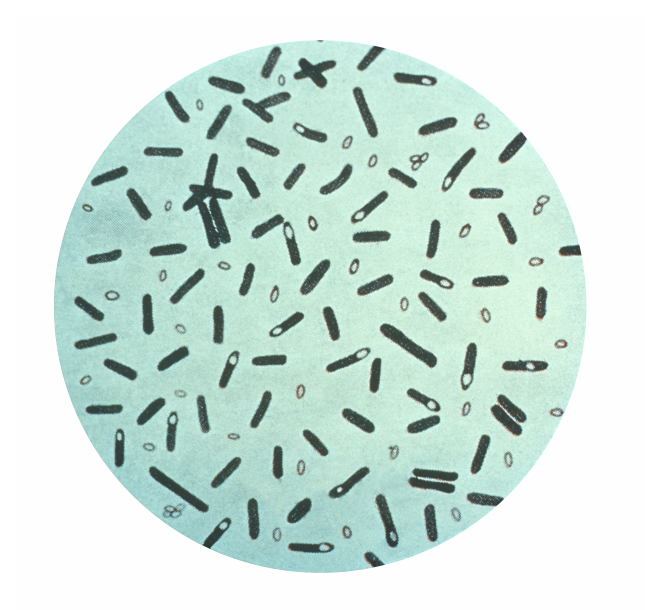
- Photomicrograph of Clostridium botulinum bacteria stained with crystal violet

Scientific classification
- Domain: Bacteria
- Kingdom: Bacillati
- Phylum: Bacillota
- Class: Clostridia
- Order: Eubacteriales
- Family: Clostridiaceae
- Genus: Clostridium; Prazmowski 1880

Species
- 164 Species; See List of Clostridium species for complete taxonomy.

= Clostridium =

Genus of bacteria

Clostridium is a genus of anaerobic, Gram-positive bacteria. Species of Clostridium inhabit soils and the intestinal tracts of animals, including humans. This genus includes several significant human pathogens, including the causative agents of botulism and tetanus. It also formerly included an important cause of diarrhea, Clostridioides difficile, which was reclassified into the Clostridioides genus in 2016.

== History ==
Circa 1880, in the course of studying fermentation and butyric acid synthesis, a scientist surnamed Prazmowski first assigned a binomial name to Clostridium butyricum. The mechanisms of anaerobic respiration were still not yet well elucidated at that time, so taxonomy of anaerobes was still developing.

== Taxonomy ==
As of October 2022, there are 164 validly published species in Clostridium.

The genus, as traditionally defined, contains many organisms not closely related to its type species. The issue was originally illustrated in full detail by a rRNA phylogeny from Collins 1994, which split the traditional genus (now corresponding to a large slice of Clostridia) into twenty clusters, with cluster I containing the type species Clostridium butyricum and its close relatives. Over the years, this has resulted in many new genera being split out, with the ultimate goal of constraining Clostridium to cluster I.

"Clostridium" cluster XIVa (now Lachnospiraceae) and "Clostridium" cluster IV (now Ruminococcaceae) efficiently ferment plant polysaccharide composing dietary fiber, making them important and abundant taxa in the rumen and the human large intestine. As mentioned before, these clusters are not part of current Clostridium, and use of these terms should be avoided due to ambiguous or inconsistent usage.

== Biochemistry ==
Species of Clostridium are obligate anaerobe and capable of producing endospores. They generally stain gram-positive, but as well as Bacillus, are often described as Gram-variable, because they show an increasing number of gram-negative cells as the culture ages. The Schaeffer–Fulton stain (0.5% malachite green in water) can be used to distinguish endospores of Bacillus and Clostridium from other microorganisms.

Clostridium can be differentiated from the also endospore forming genus Bacillus by its obligate anaerobic growth, the shape of endospores and the lack of catalase. Species of Desulfotomaculum form similar endospores and can be distinguished by their requirement for sulfur. Glycolysis and fermentation of pyruvic acid by Clostridia yield butyric acid, butanol, acetone, isopropanol, and carbon dioxide.

A commercially available polymerase chain reaction (PCR) test kit for C. perfringens exists.

== Biology and pathogenesis ==
Clostridium species are readily found inhabiting soils and intestinal tracts. Clostridium species are also a normal inhabitant of the healthy lower reproductive tract of females.

The main species responsible for disease in humans are:

- Clostridium botulinum can produce botulinum toxin in food or wounds and can cause botulism, which can be fatal. This same toxin is known as Botox and is used in cosmetic surgery to paralyze facial muscles to reduce the signs of aging; it also has numerous other therapeutic uses.
- Clostridium perfringens causes a wide range of symptoms, from food poisoning to cellulitis, fasciitis, necrotic enteritis and gas gangrene.
- Clostridium septicum can also cause rapidly progressive myonecrosis (gas gangrene type).
- Clostridium tetani causes tetanus.

Several more pathogenic species, that were previously described in Clostridium, have been found to belong to other genera.

- Clostridium difficile, now placed in Clostridioides.
- Clostridium histolyticum, now placed in Hathewaya.
- Clostridium sordellii, now placed in Paraclostridium, can cause a fatal infection in exceptionally rare cases after medical abortions.

== Treatment ==
Clostridium welchii and Clostridium tetani respond to sulfonamides. Clostridia are also susceptible to tetracyclines, carbapenems (imipenem), metronidazole, vancomycin, and chloramphenicol.

Clostridium botulinum is highly resistant to radiation. The vegetative cells of clostridia are heat-labile and are killed by short heating at temperatures above 72–75 °C (162–167 °F).

Lysozyme, nitrate, nitrite and propionic acid salts inhibit clostridia growth in certain food products.

== Use ==
- Clostridium thermocellum can use lignocellulosic waste and generate ethanol, thus making it a possible candidate for use in production of ethanol fuel. It also has no oxygen requirement and is thermophilic, which reduces cooling cost.
- Clostridium acetobutylicum was first used by Chaim Weizmann to produce acetone and biobutanol from starch in 1916 for the production of cordite (smokeless gunpowder) in the Weizmann process.
- Clostridium botulinum produces a potentially lethal neurotoxin used in a diluted form in the drug Botox, which is carefully injected to nerves in the face, which prevents the movement of the expressive muscles of the forehead, to delay the wrinkling effect of aging. It is also used to treat spasmodic torticollis and provides relief for around 12 to 16 weeks.
- Clostridium butyricum strain MIYAIRI 588 is marketed in Japan, Korea, and China for Clostridium difficile prophylaxis due to its reported ability to interfere with the growth of the latter.
- Some clostridia that cause gas gangrene produce hyaluronidase, deoxyribonuclease, lecithinase, leukocidin, protease, lipase, and hemolysin.
- Clostridium ljungdahlii, recently discovered in commercial chicken wastes, can produce ethanol from single-carbon sources including synthesis gas, a mixture of carbon monoxide and hydrogen, that can be generated from the partial combustion of either fossil fuels or biomass.
- Clostridium butyricum converts glycerol to 1,3-propanediol.
- Genes from Clostridium thermocellum have been inserted into transgenic mice to allow the production of endoglucanase. The experiment was intended to learn more about how the digestive capacity of monogastric animals could be improved.
- Nonpathogenic strains of Clostridium may help in the treatment of diseases such as cancer. Research shows that Clostridium can selectively target cancer cells. Some strains can enter and replicate within solid tumors. Clostridium could, therefore, be used to deliver therapeutic proteins to tumours. This use of Clostridium has been demonstrated in a variety of preclinical models.
- Mixtures of Clostridium species, such as Clostridium beijerinckii, Clostridium butyricum, and species from other genera have been shown to produce biohydrogen from yeast waste.
- Clostridium symbiosum are also an important gut bacteria, which produce BilR, bilirubin reductase, which is a critical enzyme in the metabolic recycling of heme
