= Eubacteriales =

Scientific classification
- Domain: Bacteria
- Kingdom: Bacillati
- Phylum: Bacillota
- Class: Clostridia
- Order: Eubacteriales; Buchanan 1917 (Approved Lists 1980)

Families
- See text

Synonyms
- "Eubacteriineae" Breed, Murray & Hitchens 1944

Order of bacteria

The Eubacteriales are an order of bacteria placed within the class Clostridia.

== Phylogeny ==
The currently accepted taxonomy is based on the List of Prokaryotic names with Standing in Nomenclature (LPSN) and National Center for Biotechnology Information (NCBI)

=== External phylogeny ===
16S rRNA based LTP_10_2024

- - - Peptococcales
      Peptococcaceae
    - "Proteinivoracales"
      Proteinivoracaceae
  - - Eubacteriales s.s.
      - Garciellaceae
      - Eubacteriaceae [incl. Anaerofustaceae & Alkalibacteraceae]

- - - Tissierellales~
      - Gottschalkiaceae
      - - Proteiniboraceae
        - - Thermohalobacteraceae
          - - Caldisalinibacteraceae
            - - Sporosalibacteriaceae
              - - Clostridiisalibacteraceae
                - Senegaliaceae
  - - Tissierellales
      - - Dethiosulfatibacteraceae
        - Sedimentibacteraceae
      - - - - Acidilutibacteraceae
            - Sporanaerobacteraceae
          - - Tepidimicrobiaceae
            - Tissierellaceae
        - Peptoniphilaceae
    - Peptostreptococcales
      - Caminicellaceae
      - - - Guggenheimella
          - - "Fusibacteraceae"
            - - Acidaminobacteraceae
              - Anaerovoracaceae ["Mogibacteriaceae"]
        - - Clostridiaceae~2
          - - Thermotaleaceae
            - - - "Isachenkoniaceae"
                - - - Tindalliaceae
                    - Natronincolaceae
                  - Alkaliphilus [incl. Serpentinicella]
              - - Peptoclostridiaceae
                - - Filifactoraceae
                  - Peptostreptococcaceae

- - - - Gracilibacteraceae
      - - Lutisporales
          Lutisporaceae
    - - Clostridiales
        - Oxobacteraceae
        - - Caloramatoraceae
          - Clostridiaceae
  - - - - Christensenellales
          - Pumilibacteraceae
          - Christensenellaceae
      - - Aristaeellaceae [incl. Gehongia, Luoshenia]
        - - Mahellales
            Mahellaceae
          - Caldicoprobacterales
            - Xylanivirgaceae
            - Caldicoprobacteraceae
    - - - - "Petroclostridiales"
            "Petroclostridiaceae"
          - Monoglobales
            Monoglobaceae
        - - Acetivibrionales
            - "Thermoclostridiaceae"
            - - - Fastidiosipilaceae ["Mageeibacillaceae"]
                - "Saccharofermentanaceae"
              - Acetivibrionaceae ["Anaerobacteriaceae"; "Pseudobacteroidaceae", "Ruminiclostridiaceae"]
          - "Oscillospirales"
            - - Butyricicoccaceae
              - Oscillospiraceae
            - - - Ethanoligenentaceae
                - Acutalibacteraceae
              - Ruminococcaceae
      - - Lachnospirales
          - Anaerotignaceae
          - - - "Gallispiraceae" [incl. Anaeropeptidivorans]
              - - - Defluviitaleaceae
                  - Cellulosilyticaceae
                - Vallitaleaceae ["Natranaerovirgaceae"]
            - Lachnospiraceae Rainey 2010

120 marker proteins based GTDB 09-RS220

- "Clostridiia" s.s.
  - - Mahellales
      Mahellaceae Chuvochina et al. 2024
    - Caldicoprobacterales
      - Xylanivirgaceae Liu et al. 2020
      - Caldicoprobacteraceae Yokoyama et al. 2010
  - - - - Lutisporales
          Lutisporaceae Chuvochina et al. 2024
        - Clostridiales
          - Oxobacteraceae Chuvochina et al. 2024
          - - Caloramatoraceae Chuvochina et al. 2024
            - Clostridiaceae Pribram 1933
      - - - Eubacteriales s.s.
            - Garciellaceae Chuvochina et al. 2024
            - - Anaerofustaceae Chuvochina et al. 2024
              - - Alkalibacteraceae Chuvochina et al. 2024
                - Eubacteriaceae Ludwig et al. 2010
        - - Tissierellales
            - - Dethiosulfatibacteraceae Chuvochina et al. 2024
              - Sedimentibacteraceae Chuvochina et al. 2024
            - - - "Abyssisolibacteraceae" Pallen, Rodriguez-R & Alikhan 2022
                - - - Clostridiisalibacteraceae Chuvochina et al. 2024
                    - "Senegaliaceae" Pallen, Rodriguez-R & Alikhan 2022
                  - - - Caldisalinibacteraceae Chuvochina et al. 2024
                      - Thermohalobacteraceae Spring 2021
                    - - "Sporosalibacteriaceae" Pallen, Rodriguez-R & Alikhan 2022
                      - - Gottschalkiaceae Poehlein et al. 2017c
                        - Proteiniboraceae Chuvochina et al. 2024
              - - - - Acidilutibacteraceae Fan et al. 2023
                    - Sporanaerobacteraceae Fan et al. 2023
                  - - Tepidimicrobiaceae Fan et al. 2023
                    - Tissierellaceae Wu et al. 2020
                - Peptoniphilaceae Johnson et al. 2014
          - Peptostreptococcales
            - - - Caminicellaceae Chuvochina et al. 2024
                - Acidaminobacteraceae Chuvochina et al. 2024
              - - Thermotaleaceae Chuvochina et al. 2024
                - Anaerovoracaceae Chuvochina et al. 2024 ["Mogibacteriaceae"]
            - - - "Isachenkoniaceae" Pallen, Rodriguez-R & Alikhan 2022
                - - Tindalliaceae Chuvochina et al. 2024
                  - Natronincolaceae Chuvochina et al. 2024
              - - Filifactoraceae Chuvochina et al. 2024
                - Peptostreptococcaceae Ezaki et al. 2010 [Peptoclostridiaceae]
    - - - Christensenellales
          - - - "Aphodomorphaceae" Pallen, Rodriguez-R & Alikhan 2022
              - - "Allochristensenellaceae" Pallen, Rodriguez-R & Alikhan 2022
                - Christensenellaceae Morotomi, Nagai & Watanabe 2012
            - - - Gehongia {NSJ-53}
                - - Luoshenia {GCA-900066905}
                  - "Maliibacteriaceae" Traore et al. 2023
              - - "Parachristensenellaceae" Pallen, Rodriguez-R & Alikhan 2022
                - - "Spyradocolaceae" Pallen, Rodriguez-R & Alikhan 202
                  - Aristaeellaceae Mahoney-Kurpe et al. 2023
          - - "Ca. Neochristensenella" {QALW01}
            - - - "Onthoplasmataceae" Pallen, Rodriguez-R & Alikhan 2022
                - Pumilibacteraceae Afrizal et al. 2024
              - - - "Stercoripulliclostridiaceae" Pallen, Rodriguez-R & Alikhan 2022
                  - - "Faecicolaceae" Pallen, Rodriguez-R & Alikhan 2022
                    - "Alloclostridiaceae" Pallen, Rodriguez-R & Alikhan 2022
                - - "Limihabitantaceae" Pallen, Rodriguez-R & Alikhan 2022
                  - "Borkfalkiaceae" Hildebrand, Pallen & Bork 2020
      - - - - - "Merdicolales"
                "Merdicolaceae" Pallen, Rodriguez-R & Alikhan 2022
            - - - "Egerieisomatales"
                  "Egerieisomataceae" Pallen, Rodriguez-R & Alikhan 2022
                - "Saccharofermentanales"
                  - Fastidiosipilaceae Chuvochina et al. 2024 ["Mageeibacillaceae"]
                  - "Saccharofermentanaceae" corrig. Gilroy et al. 2022
              - - Acetivibrionales A
                  "Thermoclostridiaceae" Pallen, Rodriguez-R & Alikhan 2022
                - Acetivibrionales
                  - Acetivibrionaceae Chuvochina et al. 2024
                  - - "Pseudobacteroidaceae" Pallen, Rodriguez-R & Alikhan 2022
                    - - "Anaerobacteriaceae" Pallen, Rodriguez-R & Alikhan 2022
                      - "Ruminiclostridiaceae" GTDB 2017
          - - - - "Petroclostridiales"
                  "Petroclostridiaceae" Pallen, Rodriguez-R & Alikhan 2022
                - Monoglobales
                  Monoglobaceae Chuvochina et al. 2024
              - - UMGS1810
                  "Qingrenia" {UMGS1810}
                - "Avimonoglobales"
                  - "Congzhengia" {UBA9506}
                  - - "Aphodoplasmaceae" (sic) Pallen, Rodriguez-R & Alikhan 2022
                    - "Avimonoglobaceae" Pallen, Rodriguez-R & Alikhan 2022
            - - "Oscillospirales"
                - - "Geddesellaceae" Pallen, Rodriguez-R & Alikhan 2022
                  - - "Woodwardibiaceae" (sic) Pallen, Rodriguez-R & Alikhan 2022
                    - "Avispirillaceae" Pallen, Rodriguez-R & Alikhan 2022
                - - - "Feifaniaceae" Liu et al. 2021 ["Galloscillospiraceae"]
                    - - - "Ca. Allobutyricicoccus" {UMGS1384}
                        - Butyricicoccaceae Chuvochina et al. 2024
                      - Oscillospiraceae Peshkoff 1940
                  - - "Tabaqchaliaceae" Pallen, Rodriguez-R & Alikhan 2022
                    - - Ethanoligenentaceae Chuvochina et al. 2024
                      - - Acutalibacteraceae Chuvochina et al. 2024 ["Yeguiaceae"]
                        - Ruminococcaceae Rainey 2010
        - - Lachnospirales
            - - - Anaeropeptidivorans Köller et al. 2022 {UBA5962}
                - "Gallispiraceae" Pallen, Rodriguez-R & Alikhan 2022
              - Anaerotignaceae Chuvochina et al. 2024
            - - - Defluviitaleaceae Jabari et al. 2012
                - Cellulosilyticaceae Dong & Zhou 2023
              - - - Vallitalea okinawensis Sun et al. 2019 {Vallitaleaceae_A}
                  - "Bianqueaceae" Liu et al. 2021
                - - - "Natranaerovirgaceae" Pallen, Rodriguez-R & Alikhan 2022 ex Sorokin & Merkel 2024
                    - Vallitaleaceae Quéméneur et al. 2019
                  - Lachnospiraceae Rainey 2010

Unassigned families:

- "Betainaceae" Jones et al. 2019
- "Darwinibacteraceae" Puchol-Royo et al. 2023
- "Wallacebacteraceae" Puchol-Royo et al. 2023
