= Azorensis =

Azorensis may refer to:

- Caloranaerobacter azorensis, species of bacteria
- Cyclophora azorensis, species of moth
- Mitromorpha azorensis, species of sea snail
- Roseovarius azorensis, species of bacteria
- Scissurella azorensis, species of sea snail
- Thermothrix azorensis, species of bacteria
- Udea azorensis, species of moth
