= Crassaminicella =

Scientific classification
- Domain: Bacteria
- Kingdom: Bacillati
- Phylum: Bacillota
- Class: Clostridia
- Order: Eubacteriales
- Family: Clostridiaceae
- Genus: Crassaminicella; Lakhal et al. 2015

Type species
- Crassaminicella profunda Lakhal et al. 2015

Species
- Crassaminicella indica; Crassaminicella profunda; Crassaminicella thermophila

Genus of bacteria

Crassaminicella is a genus of bacteria from the family Clostridiaceae. Crassaminicella profunda has been isolated from deep sea sediments from the Southern Trough from the Guaymas Basin.

== Phylogeny ==
The currently accepted taxonomy is based on the List of Prokaryotic names with Standing in Nomenclature (LPSN) and National Center for Biotechnology Information (NCBI)

16S rRNA based LTP_10_2024

- - - Anaeromicrobium sediminis Zhang et al. 2017
    - Crassaminicella profunda Lakhal et al. 2015
  - - Marinisporobacter balticus Vandieken et al. 2017
    - - Crassaminicella species‑group 2
        - Crassaminicella indica Jiao et al. 2023
        - Crassaminicella thermophila Li et al. 2021

120 marker proteins based GTDB 09-RS220

- - Crassaminicella thermophila Li et al. 2021
  - - Marinisporobacter balticus Vandieken et al. 2017
    - - Crassaminicella
        - C. indica Jiao et al. 2023
        - C. profunda Lakhal et al. 2015
