= Transvaalensis =

Transvaalensis may refer to:

- Alkaliphilus transvaalensis, bacterium
- Clathrus transvaalensis, species of fungus
- Dracaena transvaalensis, species of tree
- Erythrophysa transvaalensis, species of plant
- Euseius transvaalensis, species of mite
- Megastigmus transvaalensis, species of wasp
- Melhania transvaalensis, species of plant
- Procavia transvaalensis, species of hyrax
- Pseudocordylus transvaalensis, species of lizard
- Xenocalamus transvaalensis, species of snake
