= Youngiibacter multivorans =

Scientific classification
- Domain: Bacteria
- Kingdom: Bacillati
- Phylum: Bacillota
- Class: Clostridia
- Order: Eubacteriales
- Family: Clostridiaceae
- Genus: Youngiibacter
- Species: Y. multivorans

Binomial name
- Youngiibacter multivorans (Tanaka et al. 1992) Lawson et al. 2014

Synonyms
- Acetivibrio multivorans

Species of bacterium

Youngiibacter multivorans is a Gram-negative bacterium from the genus Youngiibacter.
