= Caloramator fervidus =

Scientific classification
- Domain: Bacteria
- Kingdom: Bacillati
- Phylum: Bacillota
- Class: Clostridia
- Order: Eubacteriales
- Family: Clostridiaceae
- Genus: Caloramator
- Species: C. fervidus

Binomial name
- Caloramator fervidus (Patel et al. 1987) Collins et al. 1994

Synonyms
- Caloramator ferfidus; Clostridium fervidum; Clostridium fervidus

Species of bacterium

Caloramator fervidus, previously known as Clostridium fervidus, is a bacterium belonging to the Bacillota.
