= Anoxybacillus gonensis =

Scientific classification
- Domain: Bacteria
- Kingdom: Bacillati
- Phylum: Bacillota
- Class: Bacilli
- Order: Bacillales
- Family: Bacillaceae
- Genus: Anoxybacillus
- Species: A. gonensis

Binomial name
- Anoxybacillus gonensis Belduz et al. 2003

Species of bacterium

Anoxybacillus gonensis is a moderately thermophilic, xylose-utilizing, endospore-forming bacterium. It is Gram-positive and rod-shaped, with type strain G2^{T} (=NCIMB 13933^{T} =NCCB 100040^{T}).
