= Haloimpatiens massiliensis =

Scientific classification
- Domain: Bacteria
- Kingdom: Bacillati
- Phylum: Bacillota
- Class: Clostridia
- Order: Eubacteriales
- Family: Clostridiaceae
- Genus: Haloimpatiens
- Species: H. massiliensis

Binomial name
- Haloimpatiens massiliensis Anani et al. 2020

Type strain
- Marseille-P1935

Synonyms
- Khelaifiella massiliensis Khelaifiabacterium massiliensis

Species of bacterium

Haloimpatiens massiliensis is a Gram-positive, anaerobic and rod-shaped bacterium from the genus Haloimpatiens which has been isolated from the gut of an infant from Marseille.
