= Natronincola =

Scientific classification
- Domain: Bacteria
- Kingdom: Bacillati
- Phylum: Bacillota
- Class: Clostridia
- Order: Peptostreptococcales
- Family: Natronincolaceae
- Genus: Natronincola; Zhilina et al. 1999

Type species
- Natronincola histidinovorans Zhilina et al. 1999

Species
- Natronincola ferrireducens; Natronincola histidinovorans; Natronincola peptidivorans

Synonyms
- Natronoincola

Genus of bacteria

Natronincola is a genus of bacteria from the family Natronincolaceae. Natronincola comes from two parts. "Natron" is from the Arabic natrun, meaning sodium carbonate or soda, and "incola" is Latin for "inhabitant" or "dweller."

== Phylogeny ==
The currently accepted taxonomy is based on the List of Prokaryotic names with Standing in Nomenclature (LPSN) and National Center for Biotechnology Information (NCBI)

16S rRNA based LTP_10_2024

- - - Natronincola
      - N. histidinovorans Zhilina et al. 1999
      - N. peptidivorans corrig. Zhilina et al. 2009
  - - Anaerovirgula multivorans Pikuta et al. 2006
    - - Clostridium formicaceticum corrig. Andreesen, Gottschalk & Schlegel 1970
      - - Clostridium aceticum Wieringa 1940 ex Gottschalk & Braun 1981
        - Natronincola ferrireducens corrig. Zhilina et al. 2009

120 marker proteins based GTDB 09-RS220

- - - Anaerovirgula multivorans
    - Natronincola peptidivorans
  - - Natronincola ferrireducens
    - - Clostridium_W
        - Clostridium aceticum
        - Clostridium formicaceticum
