= Paraliobacillus quinghaiensis =

Scientific classification
- Domain: Bacteria
- Kingdom: Bacillati
- Phylum: Bacillota
- Class: Bacilli
- Order: Bacillales
- Family: Bacillaceae
- Genus: Paraliobacillus
- Species: P. quinghaiensis

Binomial name
- Paraliobacillus quinghaiensis Chen et al. 2009

Type strain
- CGMCC 1.6333, DSM 17857, YIM-C158

Species of bacterium

Paraliobacillus quinghaiensis is a Gram-positive, endospore-forming, moderately halophilic, rod-shaped and motile bacterium from the genus of Paraliobacillus which has been isolated from sediments from Dabuxun Lake, a high-salinity lake in the Qaidam Basin in China.
