= Massilioclostridium =

Scientific classification
- Domain: Bacteria
- Phylum: Bacillota
- Class: Clostridia
- Order: Eubacteriales
- Family: Clostridiaceae
- Genus: Massilioclostridium Lo et al. 2017

Type species
- "Massilioclostridium coli" Lo et al. 2017

Species
- "M. coli"

Genus of bacteria

Massilioclostridium is a Gram-positive, strict anaerobic, non-spore-forming and non-motile bacterial genus from the family Clostridiaceae with one known species (Massilioclostridium coli). Massilioclostridium coli has been isolated from the left colon of a patient.
