= Haloimpatiens lingqiaonensis =

Scientific classification
- Domain: Bacteria
- Kingdom: Bacillati
- Phylum: Bacillota
- Class: Clostridia
- Order: Eubacteriales
- Family: Clostridiaceae
- Genus: Haloimpatiens
- Species: H. lingqiaonensis

Binomial name
- Haloimpatiens lingqiaonensis Wu et al. 2016

Type strain
- ZC-CMC3

Species of bacterium

Haloimpatiens lingqiaonensis is a Gram-positive, peritrichous, non-spore-forming and rod-shaped bacterium from the genus Haloimpatiens which has been isolated from wastewater from a paper mill.
