= Gottschalkia acidurici =

Scientific classification
- Domain: Bacteria
- Kingdom: Bacillati
- Phylum: Bacillota
- Class: Clostridia
- Order: Tissierellales
- Family: Gottschalkiaceae
- Genus: Gottschalkia
- Species: G. acidurici

Binomial name
- Gottschalkia acidurici (Liebert 1909) Poehlein et al. 2017

Synonyms
- Clostridium acidurici

Species of bacteria

Gottschalkia acidurici is a species of bacteria belonging to the family of Gottschalkiaceae. It was formerly placed in the genus Clostridium of the Clostridiaceae. It can be anywhere between 2.5 and 4 micrometers in length and anywhere between 0.5 and 0.7 micrometers in width.
