= Lutispora saccharofermentans =

Scientific classification
- Domain: Bacteria
- Kingdom: Bacillati
- Phylum: Bacillota
- Class: Clostridia
- Order: Eubacteriales
- Family: Clostridiaceae
- Genus: Lutispora
- Species: L. saccharofermentans

Binomial name
- Lutispora saccharofermentans El Houari et al. 2023

Species of bacterium

Lutispora saccharofermentans, is an anaerobic bacteria. Lutispora saccharofermentans was first isolated from methanogenic enrichment cultures derived from a material collected from a lab-scale methanogenic landfill bioreactor.

== Taxonomy ==
Lutispora saccharofermentans is a type of bacteria species belonging to the domain Bacteria, phylum Firmicutes, class Clostridia, order Clostridiales, family Clostridiaceae, and genus Lutispora. This taxonomy places it in a group noted for its broad metabolic capabilities and importance in both environmental and industrial processes, notably the Firmicutes, a phylum that includes many important anaerobic bacteria. Currently, there are 77 child taxa in the family Clostridiaceae, 49 of which have valid publications and taxonomically named species. Here, we describe the isolation and characterisation of strain m25T, a unique member of the genus Lutispora within the family Clostridiaceae. This strain was obtained from a lab-scale methanogenic (LSM) bioreactor that had been injected with microbiota derived from drilling waste and landfill leachate. As of right now, there is only one species of Lutispora that has been properly published—Lutispora thermophila—which was isolated from thermophilic methanogenic sludge.

== Morphology ==
The cells are considered rod-shaped and long in length. The width of each cell is 0.5-0.7 μm. The cells are also capable of movement because of the flagellum.

== Phylogeny ==
Lutispora saccharofermentans was identified from methanogenic cultures grown in a lab-scale methanogenic landfill bioreactor. This Gram-negative bacteria metabolizes glycerol, pyruvate, arginine, cysteine, and different carbohydrates with yeast extract as a growth enhancer. Phylogenetically, it is most closely related to Lutispora thermophila, with 95.02% similarity in 16S rRNA gene sequences, placing it solidly within the Lutispora genus. Despite this close relationship, genomic investigations confirm its position as a separate species, necessitating a revision of the Lutisporagenus to include non-spore-forming, mesophilic individuals.

== Ecology ==
Lutispora saccharofermentans is found in anaerobic environments where it contributes to the breakdown of organic compounds. Such environments include wastewater treatment plants and possibly other anaerobic digestion systems where complex organic matter is broken down into simpler molecules.This microorganism utilizes a fermentative metabolism to convert sugars into methane, indicating its role in the final stages of biomass decomposition in anaerobic environments. This process is crucial for the carbon cycle in such ecosystems, converting organic carbon into methane, a potent greenhouse gas. As a methanogen, Lutispora saccharofermentans plays a significant role in methane production, a critical process in anaerobic digestion. Methane production by bacteria like Lutispora saccharofermentans is a key step in the degradation of organic materials in anaerobic environments, contributing to the global carbon cycle and energy flow within these ecosystems.

== Physiology ==
Lutispora saccharofermentans operate in oxygen-free environments, utilizing anaerobic fermentation to break down sugars.This process does not require oxygen, making it well-suited for environments such as sediments, gastrointestinal tracts of animals, or anaerobic digesters.The ability to ferment glucose and xylose indicates that Lutispora saccharofermentans has the enzymatic machinery to metabolize these sugars . Glucose and xylose are common monosaccharides derived from the breakdown of more complex carbohydrates found in biomass. This ability suggests a role in the degradation of plant material in its natural habitats. Methanogenesis is the hallmark metabolic trait of Lutispora saccharofermentans. Methanogenic bacteria, including this species, convert substrates like hydrogen and carbon dioxide, acetate, or in this case, sugars, into methane. While the article does not specify the exact methanogenic pathway, common pathways include the reduction of carbon dioxide with hydrogen, the fermentation of acetate, and the dismutation of methyl compounds. Given the substrates mentioned, Lutispora saccharofermentans likely employ a pathway that efficiently converts sugar fermentation products into methane. Methanogenesis is a form of energy conservation for archaea like Lutispora saccharofermentans, allowing them to grow and multiply.

== Applications ==
The digestion process that involves Lutispora saccharofermentans can produce not only methane but also digestate, a by-product that can be used as a nutrient-rich fertilizer. This supports sustainable agricultural practices by providing a natural fertilizer option, reducing the need for chemical fertilizers, and promoting a circular economy approach in agriculture. Lutispora saccharofermentans has the potential to play a role in the biodegradation of organic waste materials, including agricultural waste and possibly urban organic waste. By converting these materials into methane, it not only helps in reducing waste volume but also turns waste into a valuable energy resource. The key step in producing biogas is the conversion of carbohydrates into methane, which this microbe is capable of doing. By lowering our dependency on fossil fuels and assisting in the fight against climate change, biogas is a renewable energy source that may be utilized for transportation, heating, and the production of electricity.
