= Pontibacillus litoralis =

Scientific classification
- Domain: Bacteria
- Kingdom: Bacillati
- Phylum: Bacillota
- Class: Bacilli
- Order: Bacillales
- Family: Bacillaceae
- Genus: Pontibacillus
- Species: P. litoralis

Binomial name
- Pontibacillus litoralis Chen et al. 2010

Type strain
- DSM 21186, JSM 072002, KCTC 13237

Species of bacterium

Pontibacillus litoralis is a Gram-positive, moderately halophilic, facultatively anaerobic, endospore-forming and motile bacterium from the genus of Pontibacillus which has been isolated from the surface of the sea anemone Anthopleura xanthogrammica from the Naozhou Island in China.
