= Paraliobacillus ryukyuensis =

Scientific classification
- Domain: Bacteria
- Kingdom: Bacillati
- Phylum: Bacillota
- Class: Bacilli
- Order: Caryophanales
- Family: Bacillaceae
- Genus: Paraliobacillus
- Species: P. ryukyuensis

Binomial name
- Paraliobacillus ryukyuensis Ishikawa et al. 2003

Type strain
- BCRC 17331, CCRC 17331, CIP 108014, DSM 15140, IAM 15001, JCM 21472, NBRC 100001, NRIC 0520, O15-7

Synonyms
- Medilactobacillus ryukyuensis

Species of bacterium

Paraliobacillus ryukyuensis is a Gram-positive, extremely halotolerant, alkaliphilic, endospore-forming, slightly halophilic and facultatively anaerobic bacterium from the genus of Paraliobacillus which has been isolated from a decomposing marine alga from Okinawa in Japan.
