= Anoxynatronum sibiricum =

Scientific classification
- Domain: Bacteria
- Kingdom: Bacillati
- Phylum: Bacillota
- Class: Clostridia
- Order: Eubacteriales
- Family: Clostridiaceae
- Genus: Anoxynatronum
- Species: A. sibiricum

Binomial name
- Anoxynatronum sibiricum Garnova and Zhilina 2003

Type strain
- DSM 15060, Uniqem U218, Uniqem U218d, Z-7981, VKM B-2327

Species of bacterium

Anoxynatronum sibiricum is a Gram-positive, saccharolytic, anaerobic, alkaliphilic bacterium from the genus of Anoxynatronum which has been isolated from the Baikal lake.
