= Paraliobacillus sediminis =

Scientific classification
- Domain: Bacteria
- Kingdom: Bacillati
- Phylum: Bacillota
- Class: Bacilli
- Order: Bacillales
- Family: Bacillaceae
- Genus: Paraliobacillus
- Species: P. sediminis

Binomial name
- Paraliobacillus sediminis Cao et al. 2017

Type strain
- KCTC 33762, MCCC 1H00136, 126C4

Species of bacterium

Paraliobacillus sediminis is a Gram-positive, slightly halophilic, facultatively anaerobic, endospore-forming and motile bacterium from the genus of Paraliobacillus which has been isolated from sea sediments from the East China Sea.
