= Tindallia texcoconensis =

Scientific classification
- Domain: Bacteria
- Kingdom: Bacillati
- Phylum: Bacillota
- Class: Clostridia
- Order: Eubacteriales
- Family: Clostridiaceae
- Genus: Tindallia
- Species: T. texcoconensis

Binomial name
- Tindallia texcoconensis Alazard et al. 2009

Synonyms
- Tindallia texcocoense

Species of bacterium

Tindallia texcoconensis is a Gram-positive, non-spore-forming, moderately halophilic, strictly anaerobic, alkaliphilic and motile bacterium from the genus Tindallia which has been isolated from groundwater from the lake Texcoco in Mexico.
