= Endospore =

Protective structure formed by bacteria

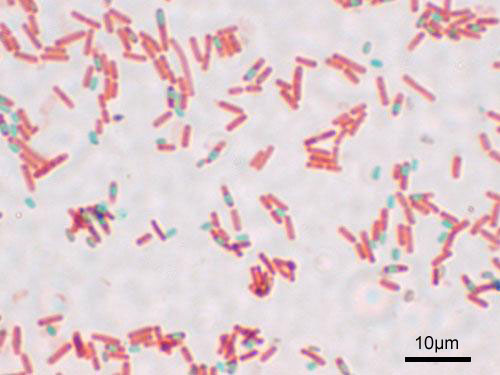
An endospore stain of the cell Bacillus subtilis showing endospores as green and the vegetative cell as red

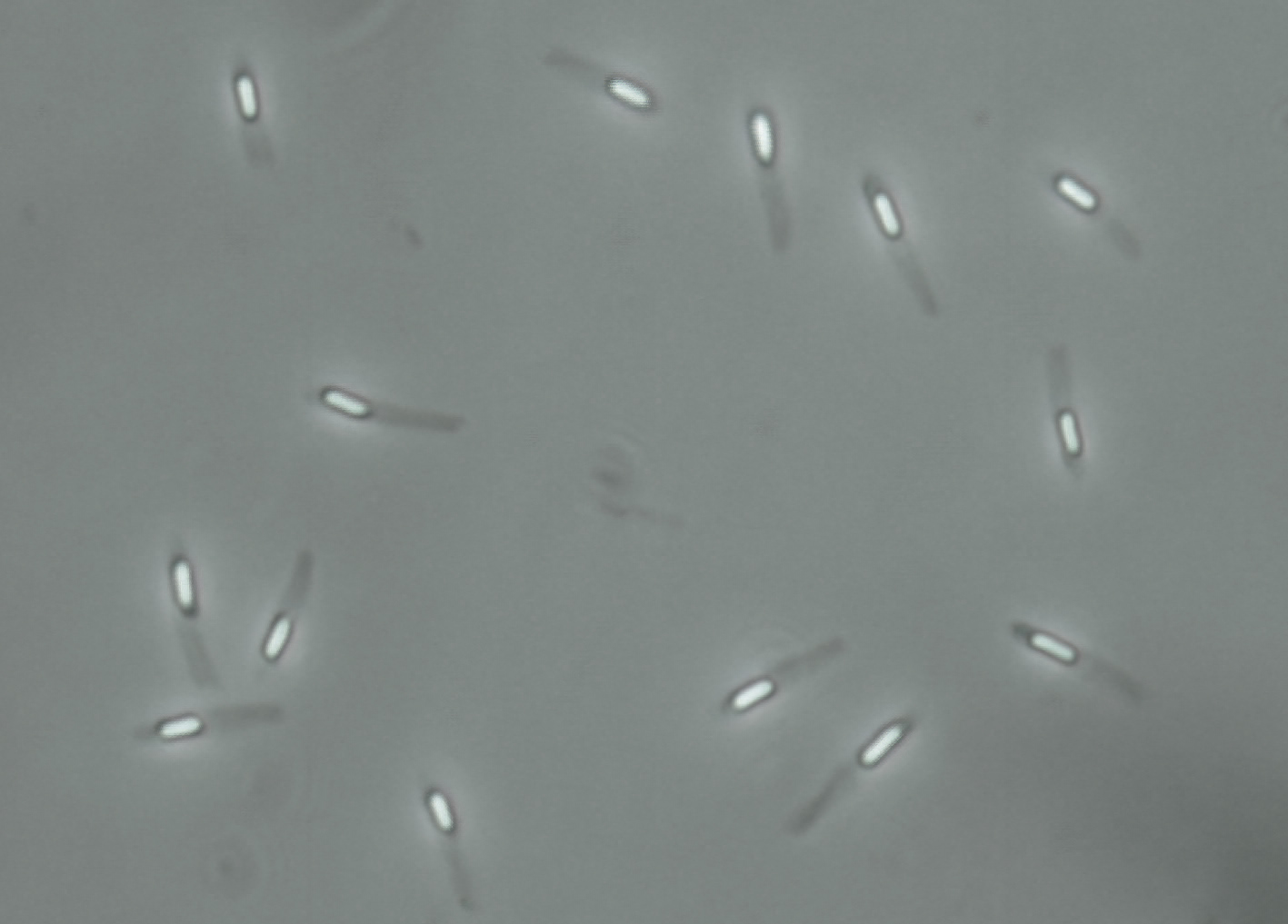
Phase-bright endospores of Paenibacillus alvei imaged with phase-contrast microscopy

An endospore is a dormant, tough, and non-reproductive structure produced by some bacteria in the phylum Bacillota. The name "endospore" is suggestive of a spore or seed-like form (endo means 'within'), but it is not a true spore (i.e., not an offspring). It is a stripped-down, dormant form to which the bacterium can reduce itself. Endospore formation is usually triggered by a lack of nutrients, and usually occurs in Gram-positive bacteria. In endospore formation, the bacterium divides within its cell wall, and one side then engulfs the other. Endospores enable bacteria to lie dormant for extended periods, even centuries. There are many reports of spores remaining viable over 10,000 years, and revival of spores millions of years old has been claimed. There is one report of viable spores of Bacillus marismortui in salt crystals approximately 25 million years old. When the environment becomes more favorable, the endospore can reactivate itself into a vegetative state. Most types of bacteria cannot form endospores. Examples of bacterial species that can form endospores include Bacillus cereus, Bacillus anthracis, Bacillus thuringiensis, Clostridium botulinum, and Clostridium tetani. Endospore formation does not occur within the Archaea or Eukaryota.

The endospore consists of the bacterium's DNA, ribosomes and large amounts of dipicolinic acid. Dipicolinic acid is a spore-specific chemical that appears to help in the ability for endospores to maintain dormancy. This chemical accounts for up to 10% of the spore's dry weight.

Endospores can survive without nutrients. They are resistant to ultraviolet radiation, desiccation, high temperature, extreme freezing and chemical disinfectants. Thermo-resistant endospores were first hypothesized by Ferdinand Cohn after studying Bacillus subtilis growth on cheese after boiling the cheese. His notion of spores being the reproductive mechanism for the growth was a large blow to the previous suggestions of spontaneous generation. Astrophysicist Steinn Sigurdsson said "There are viable bacterial spores that have been found that are 40 million years old on Earth—and we know they're very hardened to radiation." Common antibacterial agents that work by destroying vegetative cell walls do not affect endospores. Endospores are commonly found in soil and water, where they may survive for long periods of time. A variety of different microorganisms form "spores" or "cysts", but the endospores of low G+C gram-positive bacteria are by far the most resistant to harsh conditions.

Some classes of bacteria can turn into exospores, also known as microbial cysts, instead of endospores. Exospores and endospores are two kinds of "hibernating" or dormant stages seen in some classes of microorganisms.

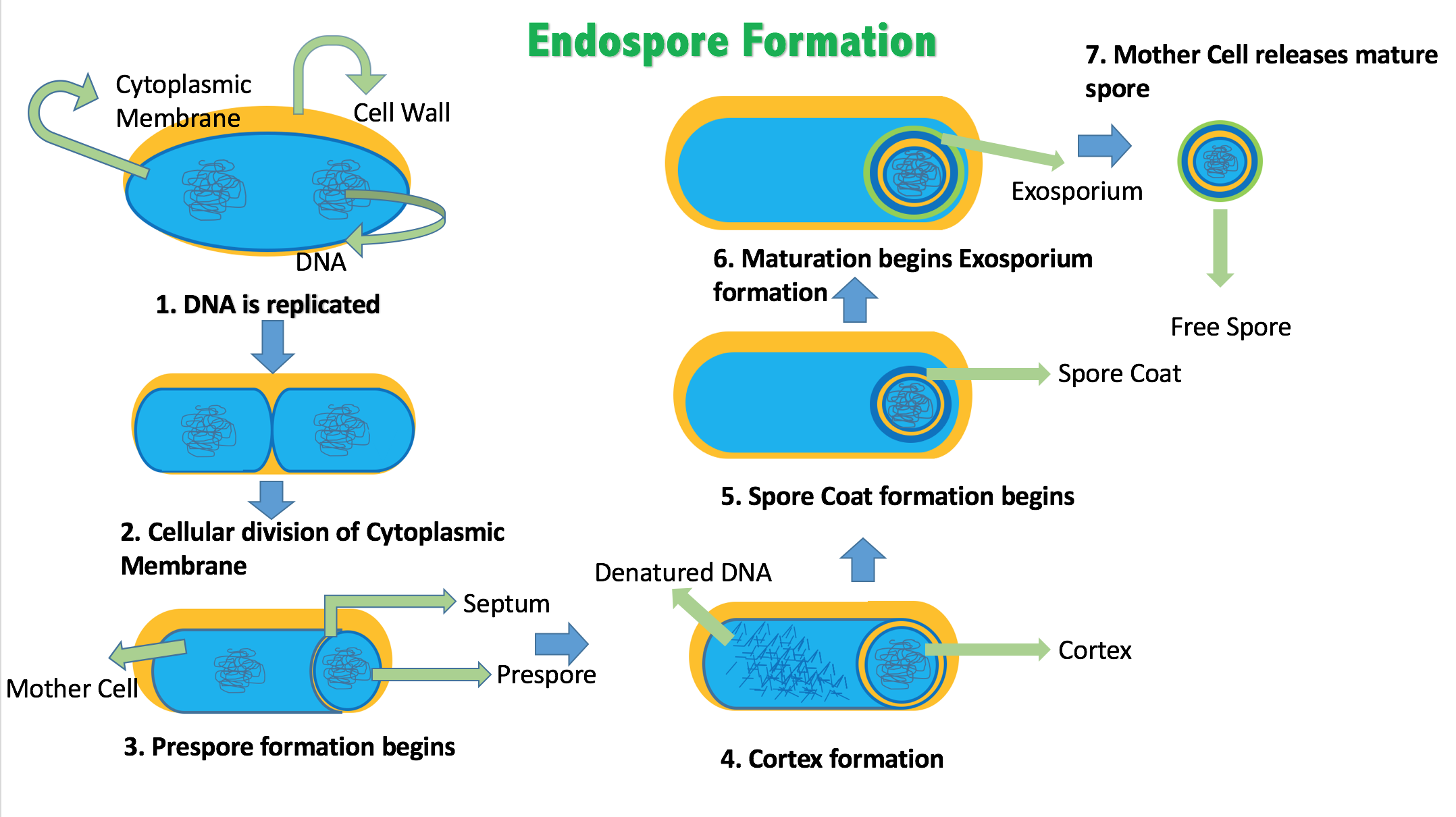
Formation of an endospore through the process of sporulation

== Life cycle of bacteria ==
The bacterial life cycle does not necessarily include sporulation. Sporulation is usually triggered by adverse environmental conditions, so as to help the survival of the bacterium. Endospores exhibit no signs of life and can thus be described as cryptobiotic. Endospores retain viability indefinitely and they can germinate into vegetative cells under the appropriate conditions. Endospores have survived thousands of years until environmental stimuli trigger germination. They have been characterized as the most durable cells produced in nature.

== Structure ==
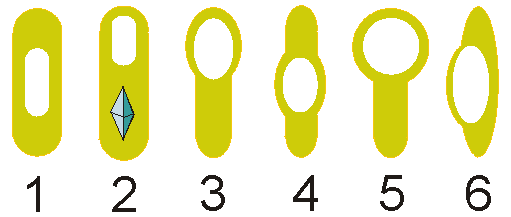
Variations in endospore morphology: (1, 4) central endospore; (2, 3, 5) terminal endospore; (6) lateral endospore

Bacteria produce a single endospore internally. The spore is sometimes surrounded by a thin covering known as the exosporium, which overlies the spore coat. The spore coat, which acts like a sieve that excludes large toxic molecules like lysozyme, is resistant to many toxic molecules and may also contain enzymes that are involved in germination. In Bacillus subtilus endospores, the spore coat is estimated to contain more than 70 coat proteins, which are organized into an inner and an outer coat layer. The X-ray diffraction pattern of purified B. subtilis endospores indicates the presence of a component with a regular periodic structure, which Kadota and Iijima speculated might be formed from a keratin-like protein. However, after further studies this group concluded that the structure of the spore coat protein was different from keratin. When the B. subtilis genome was sequenced, no ortholog of human keratin was detected. The cortex lies beneath the spore coat and consists of peptidoglycan. The core wall lies beneath the cortex and surrounds the protoplast or core of the endospore. The core contains the spore chromosomal DNA which is encased in chromatin-like proteins known as SASPs (small acid-soluble spore proteins), that protect the spore DNA from UV radiation and heat. The core also contains normal cell structures, such as ribosomes and other enzymes, but is not metabolically active.

Up to 20% of the dry weight of the endospore consists of calcium dipicolinate within the core, which is thought to stabilize the DNA. Dipicolinic acid could be responsible for the heat resistance of the spore, and calcium may aid in resistance to heat and oxidizing agents. However, mutants resistant to heat but lacking dipicolinic acid have been isolated, suggesting other mechanisms contributing to heat resistance are also at work. Small acid-soluble proteins (SASPs) are found in endospores. These proteins tightly bind and condense the DNA, and are in part responsible for resistance to UV light and DNA-damaging chemicals.

Visualising endospores under light microscopy can be difficult due to the impermeability of the endospore wall to dyes and stains. While the rest of a bacterial cell may stain, the endospore is left colourless. To combat this, a special stain technique called a Moeller stain is used. That allows the endospore to show up as red, while the rest of the cell stains blue. Another staining technique for endospores is the Schaeffer-Fulton stain, which stains endospores green and bacterial bodies red. The arrangement of spore layers is as follows:

- Exosporium
- Spore coat
- Spore cortex
- Core wall

== Location ==
The position of the endospore differs among bacterial species and is useful in identification. The main types within the cell are terminal, subterminal, and centrally placed endospores. Terminal endospores are seen at the poles of cells, whereas central endospores are more or less in the middle. Subterminal endospores are those between these two extremes, usually seen far enough towards the poles but close enough to the center so as not to be considered either terminal or central. Lateral endospores are seen occasionally.

Examples of bacteria having terminal endospores include Clostridium tetani, the pathogen that causes the disease tetanus. Bacteria having a centrally placed endospore include Bacillus cereus. Sometimes the endospore can be so large the cell can be distended around the endospore. This is typical of Clostridium tetani.

== Formation and destruction ==
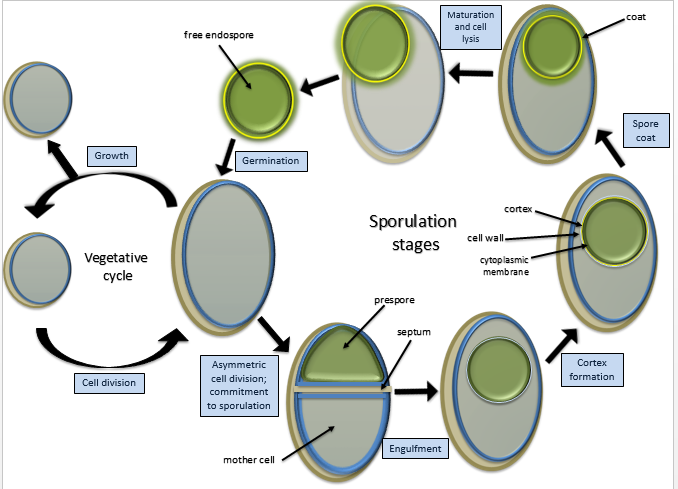
Endospore formation and cycle

Under conditions of starvation, especially the lack of carbon and nitrogen sources, a single endospore forms within some of the bacteria through a process called sporulation.

When a bacterium detects environmental conditions are becoming unfavourable it may start the process of endosporulation, which takes about eight hours. The DNA is replicated and a membrane wall known as a spore septum begins to form between it and the rest of the cell. The plasma membrane of the cell surrounds this wall and pinches off to leave a double membrane around the DNA, and the developing structure is now known as a forespore. Calcium dipicolinate, the calcium salt of dipicolinic acid, is incorporated into the forespore during this time. The dipicolinic acid helps stabilize the proteins and DNA in the endospore. Next the peptidoglycan cortex forms between the two layers and the bacterium adds a spore coat to the outside of the forespore. In the final stages of endospore formation the newly forming endospore is dehydrated and allowed to mature before being released from the mother cell. The cortex is what makes the endospore so resistant to temperature. The cortex contains an inner membrane known as the core. The inner membrane that surrounds this core leads to the endospore's resistance against UV light and harsh chemicals that would normally destroy microbes. Sporulation is now complete, and the mature endospore will be released when the surrounding vegetative cell is degraded.

Endospores are resistant to most agents that would normally kill the vegetative cells they formed from. Unlike persister cells, endospores are the result of a morphological differentiation process triggered by nutrient limitation (starvation) in the environment; endosporulation is initiated by quorum sensing within the "starving" population.Most disinfectants such as household cleaning products, alcohols, quaternary ammonium compounds and detergents have little effect on endospores. However, sterilant alkylating agents such as ethylene oxide (ETO), and 10% bleach are effective against endospores. To kill most anthrax spores, standard household bleach (with 10% sodium hypochlorite) must be in contact with the spores for at least several minutes; a very small proportion of spores can survive longer than 10 minutes in such a solution. Higher concentrations of bleach are not more effective, and can cause some types of bacteria to aggregate and thus survive.

While significantly resistant to heat and radiation, endospores can be destroyed by burning or by autoclaving at a temperature exceeding the boiling point of water, 100 °C. Endospores are able to survive at 100 °C for hours, although the larger the number of hours the fewer that will survive. An indirect way to destroy them is to place them in an environment that reactivates them to their vegetative state. They will germinate within a day or two with the right environmental conditions, and then the vegetative cells, not as hardy as endospores, can be straightforwardly destroyed. This indirect method is called Tyndallization. It was the usual method for a while in the late 19th century before the introduction of inexpensive autoclaves. Prolonged exposure to ionising radiation, such as x-rays and gamma rays, will also kill most endospores.

The endospores of certain types of (typically non-pathogenic) bacteria, such as Geobacillus stearothermophilus, are used as probes to verify that an autoclaved item has been rendered truly sterile: a small capsule containing the spores is put into the autoclave with the items; after the cycle the content of the capsule is cultured to check if anything will grow from it. If nothing will grow, then the spores were destroyed and the sterilization was successful.

In hospitals, endospores on delicate invasive instruments such as endoscopes are killed by low-temperature, and non-corrosive, ethylene oxide sterilizers. Ethylene oxide is the only low-temperature sterilant to stop outbreaks on these instruments. In contrast, "high level disinfection" does not kill endospores but is used for instruments such as a colonoscope that do not enter sterile bodily cavities. This latter method uses only warm water, enzymes, and detergents.

Bacterial endospores are resistant to antibiotics, most disinfectants, and physical agents such as radiation, boiling, and drying. The impermeability of the spore coat is thought to be responsible for the endospore's resistance to chemicals. The heat resistance of endospores is due to a variety of factors:

- Calcium dipicolinate, abundant within the endospore, may stabilize and protect the endospore's DNA.
- Small acid-soluble proteins (SASPs) saturate the endospore's DNA and protect it from heat, drying, chemicals, and radiation. They also function as a carbon and energy source for the development of a vegetative bacterium during germination.
- The cortex may osmotically remove water from the interior of the endospore and the dehydration that results is thought to be very important in the endospore's resistance to heat and radiation.
- Finally, DNA repair enzymes contained within the endospore are able to repair damaged DNA during germination.

== Reactivation ==
Reactivation of the endospore occurs when conditions are more favourable and involves activation, germination, and outgrowth. Even if an endospore is located in plentiful nutrients, it may fail to germinate unless activation has taken place. This may be triggered by heating the endospore. Germination involves the dormant endospore starting metabolic activity and thus breaking hibernation. It is commonly characterised by rupture or absorption of the spore coat, swelling of the endospore, an increase in metabolic activity, and loss of resistance to environmental stress.

Outgrowth follows germination and involves the core of the endospore manufacturing new chemical components and exiting the old spore coat to develop into a fully functional vegetative bacterial cell, which can divide to produce more cells.

Endospores possess five times more sulfur than vegetative cells. This excess sulfur is concentrated in spore coats as an amino acid, cysteine. It is believed that the macromolecule accountable for maintaining the dormant state has a protein coat rich in cystine, stabilized by S-S linkages. A reduction in these linkages has the potential to change the tertiary structure, causing the protein to unfold. This conformational change in the protein is thought to be responsible for exposing active enzymatic sites necessary for endospore germination.

Endospores can stay dormant for a very long time. For instance, endospores were found in the tombs of the Egyptian pharaohs. When placed in appropriate medium, under appropriate conditions, they were able to be reactivated. In 1995, Raul Cano of California Polytechnic State University found bacterial spores in the gut of a fossilized bee trapped in amber from a tree in the Dominican Republic. The bee fossilized in amber was dated to being about 25 million years old. The spores germinated when the amber was cracked open and the material from the gut of the bee was extracted and placed in nutrient medium. After the spores were analyzed by microscopy, it was determined that the cells were very similar to Lysinibacillus sphaericus which is found in bees in the Dominican Republic today.

== Importance ==
As a simplified model for cellular differentiation, the molecular details of endospore formation have been extensively studied, specifically in the model organism Bacillus subtilis. These studies have contributed much to our understanding of the regulation of gene expression, transcription factors, and the sigma factor subunits of RNA polymerase.

Endospores of the bacterium Bacillus anthracis were used in the 2001 anthrax attacks. The powder found in contaminated postal letters consisted of anthrax endospores. This intentional distribution led to 22 known cases of anthrax (11 inhalation and 11 cutaneous). The case fatality rate among those patients with inhalation anthrax was 45% (5/11). The six other individuals with inhalation anthrax and all the individuals with cutaneous anthrax recovered. Had it not been for antibiotic therapy, this number would likely have been higher.

Sporulation requires the presence of free oxygen. In the natural situation, this means the vegetative cycles occur within the low oxygen environment of the infected host and, within the host, the organism is exclusively in the vegetative form. Once outside the host, sporulation commences upon exposure to the air and the spore forms are essentially the exclusive phase in the environment.

=== Biotechnology ===
Bacillus subtilis spores are useful for the expression of recombinant proteins and in particular for the surface display of peptides and proteins as a tool for fundamental and applied research in the fields of microbiology, biotechnology and vaccination.

== Endospore-forming bacteria ==
Examples of endospore-forming bacteria include the genera:

- Acetonema
- Actinomyces
- Alkalibacillus
- Ammoniphilus
- Amphibacillus
- Anaerobacter
- Anaerospora
- Aneurinibacillus
- Anoxybacillus
- Bacillus
- Brevibacillus
- Caldanaerobacter
- Caloramator
- Caminicella
- Cerasibacillus
- Clostridium
- Clostridiisalibacter
- Cohnella
- Coxiella (i.e. Coxiella burnetii)
- Dendrosporobacter
- Desulfotomaculum
- Desulfosporomusa
- Desulfosporosinus
- Desulfovirgula
- Desulfunispora
- Desulfurispora
- Filifactor
- Filobacillus
- Gelria
- Geobacillus
- Geosporobacter
- Gracilibacillus
- Halobacillus
- Halonatronum
- Heliobacterium
- Heliophilum
- Laceyella
- Lentibacillus
- Lysinibacillus
- Mahella
- Metabacterium
- Moorella
- Natroniella
- Oceanobacillus
- Orenia
- Ornithinibacillus
- Oxalophagus
- Oxobacter
- Paenibacillus
- Paraliobacillus
- Pelospora
- Pelotomaculum
- Piscibacillus
- Planifilum
- Pontibacillus
- Propionispora
- Salinibacillus
- Salsuginibacillus
- Seinonella
- Shimazuella
- Sporacetigenium
- Sporoanaerobacter
- Sporobacter
- Sporobacterium
- Sporohalobacter
- Sporolactobacillus
- Sporomusa
- Sporosarcina
- Sporotalea
- Sporotomaculum
- Syntrophomonas
- Syntrophospora
- Tenuibacillus
- Tepidibacter
- Terribacillus
- Thalassobacillus
- Thermoacetogenium
- Thermoactinomyces
- Thermoalkalibacillus
- Thermoanaerobacter
- Thermoanaeromonas
- Thermobacillus
- Thermoflavimicrobium
- Thermovenabulum
- Tuberibacillus
- Virgibacillus
- Vulcanobacillus
