= Tindallia californiensis =

Scientific classification
- Domain: Bacteria
- Kingdom: Bacillati
- Phylum: Bacillota
- Class: Clostridia
- Order: Eubacteriales
- Family: Clostridiaceae
- Genus: Tindallia
- Species: T. californiensis

Binomial name
- Tindallia californiensis Pikuta et al. 2003

Type strain
- APO

Species of bacterium

Tindallia californiensis is a Gram-positive, extremely haloalkaliphilic, strictly anaerobic, acetogenic and motile bacterium from the genus Tindallia which has been isolated from sediments from the Mono Lake in California.
