= Pontibacillus salipaludis =

Scientific classification
- Domain: Bacteria
- Kingdom: Bacillati
- Phylum: Bacillota
- Class: Bacilli
- Order: Bacillales
- Family: Bacillaceae
- Genus: Pontibacillus
- Species: P. salipaludis

Binomial name
- Pontibacillus salipaludis Sultanpuram et al. 2016

Type strain
- CGMCC 1.15353, KCTC 33742, LMG 29102, 9DM

Species of bacterium

Pontibacillus salipaludis is a Gram-positive, slightly halophilic, facultatively anaerobic, rod-shaped, endospore-forming and motile bacterium from the genus of Pontibacillus which has been isolated from a salt pan from Tuticorin in India.
