= Thalassobacillus pellis =

Scientific classification
- Domain: Bacteria
- Kingdom: Bacillati
- Phylum: Bacillota
- Class: Bacilli
- Order: Bacillales
- Family: Bacillaceae
- Genus: Thalassobacillus
- Species: T. pellis

Binomial name
- Thalassobacillus pellis Sánchez-Porro et al. 2011

Type strain
- 18OM, CECT 7566, DSM 22784, JCM 16412

Species of bacterium

Thalassobacillus pellis is a Gram-positive, moderately halophilic, endospore-forming, strictly aerobic and motile bacterium from the genus of Thalassobacillus which has been isolated from salted animal hides from Istanbul in Turkey.
