= Thalassobacillus hwangdonensis =

Scientific classification
- Domain: Bacteria
- Kingdom: Bacillati
- Phylum: Bacillota
- Class: Bacilli
- Order: Bacillales
- Family: Bacillaceae
- Genus: Thalassobacillus
- Species: T. hwangdonensis

Binomial name
- Thalassobacillus hwangdonensis Lee et al. 2010

Type strain
- CCUG 56607, KCTC 13254, strain AD-1

Species of bacterium

Thalassobacillus hwangdonensis is a Gram-positive, endospore-forming, rod-shaped and motile bacterium from the genus of Thalassobacillus which has been isolated from tidal flat from the Yellow Sea in Korea.
