= Youngiibacter fragilis =

Scientific classification
- Domain: Bacteria
- Kingdom: Bacillati
- Phylum: Bacillota
- Class: Clostridia
- Order: Eubacteriales
- Family: Clostridiaceae
- Genus: Youngiibacter
- Species: Y. fragilis

Binomial name
- Youngiibacter fragilis Lawson et al. 2014

Type strain
- 232.1

Synonyms
- Clostridium fragilis Youngiibacter fragile

Species of bacterium

Youngiibacter fragilis is an obligate anaerobic, Gram-negative, non-spore-forming, rod-shaped and non-motile bacterium from the genus Youngiibacter. Y. fragilis was first isolated from coal-bed methane (CBM) produced water.
