= Geosporobacter ferrireducens =

Scientific classification
- Domain: Bacteria
- Kingdom: Bacillati
- Phylum: Bacillota
- Class: Clostridia
- Order: Eubacteriales
- Family: Clostridiaceae
- Genus: Geosporobacter
- Species: G. ferrireducens

Binomial name
- Geosporobacter ferrireducens Hong et al. 2015

Type strain
- IRF9

Species of bacterium

Geosporobacter ferrireducens is a heterotrophic, iron-reducing, alkaliphilic and anaerobic bacterium from the genus Geosporobacter which has been isolated from oil-contaminated soil from Korea.
