= Tindallia magadiensis =

Scientific classification
- Domain: Bacteria
- Kingdom: Bacillati
- Phylum: Bacillota
- Class: Clostridia
- Order: Eubacteriales
- Family: Clostridiaceae
- Genus: Tindallia
- Species: T. magadiensis

Binomial name
- Tindallia magadiensis Kevbrin et al. 1999

Type strain
- Z-7934

Synonyms
- Tindallia magadii

Species of bacterium

Tindallia magadiensis is a Gram-positive, alkaliphilic, anaerobic and non-spore-forming bacterium from the genus Tindallia which has been isolated from soda deposits from the Lake Magadi in Kenya.
