= Geosporobacter subterraneus =

Scientific classification
- Domain: Bacteria
- Kingdom: Bacillati
- Phylum: Bacillota
- Class: Clostridia
- Order: Eubacteriales
- Family: Clostridiaceae
- Genus: Geosporobacter
- Species: G. subterraneus

Binomial name
- Geosporobacter subterraneus Klouche et al. 2007

Type strain
- VNs68

Synonyms
- Geosporobacter subterrenus

Species of bacterium

Geosporobacter subterraneus is a Gram-positive, chemoorganotrophic, spore-forming, strictly anaerobic, and non-motile bacterium from the genus Geosporobacter which has been isolated from water from the Paris Basin.
