= Thalassobacillus cyri =

Scientific classification
- Domain: Bacteria
- Kingdom: Bacillati
- Phylum: Bacillota
- Class: Bacilli
- Order: Bacillales
- Family: Bacillaceae
- Genus: Thalassobacillus
- Species: T. cyri

Binomial name
- Thalassobacillus cyri Sánchez-Porro et al. 2009

Species of bacterium

Thalassobacillus cyri is a Gram-positive, moderately halophilic, strictly aerobic, rod-shaped and motil bacterium from the genus of Thalassobacillus which has been isolated from brine from the Howz Soltan Lake in Iran.
