= Erythrophysa septentrionalis =

Conservation status
- Endangered (IUCN 3.1)

Scientific classification
- Kingdom: Plantae
- Clade: Tracheophytes
- Clade: Angiosperms
- Clade: Eudicots
- Clade: Rosids
- Order: Sapindales
- Family: Sapindaceae
- Genus: Erythrophysa
- Species: E. septentrionalis

Binomial name
- Erythrophysa septentrionalis Verdc.

Species of flowering plant

Erythrophysa septentrionalis is a species of plant in the family Sapindaceae. It is endemic to Ethiopia.
