= Haloimpatiens =

Scientific classification
- Domain: Bacteria
- Kingdom: Bacillati
- Phylum: Bacillota
- Class: Clostridia
- Order: Eubacteriales
- Family: Clostridiaceae
- Genus: Haloimpatiens; Wu et al. 2016

Type species
- Haloimpatiens lingqiaonensis Wu et al. 2016

Species
- H. lingqiaonensis; H. massiliensis

Synonyms
- Khelaifiella

Genus of bacteria

Haloimpatiens is a bacterial genus from the family of Clostridiaceae.
