= Natronincola histidinovorans =

Scientific classification
- Domain: Bacteria
- Kingdom: Bacillati
- Phylum: Bacillota
- Class: Clostridia
- Order: Peptostreptococcales
- Family: Natronincolaceae
- Genus: Natronincola
- Species: N. histidinovorans

Binomial name
- Natronincola histidinovorans Zhilina et al. 1999

Type strain
- Z-7940

Synonyms
- Natronoincola histidinovorans

Species of bacterium

Natronincola histidinovorans is a moderately haloalkaliphilic, obligately anaerobic, and acetogenic bacterium from the genus Natronincola which has been isolated from soda deposits from the Lake Magadi.
