= Halobacillus karajensis =

Scientific classification
- Domain: Bacteria
- Kingdom: Bacillati
- Phylum: Bacillota
- Class: Bacilli
- Order: Bacillales
- Family: Halobacillaceae
- Genus: Halobacillus
- Species: H. karajensis

Binomial name
- Halobacillus karajensis Amoozegar et al. 2003

Species of bacterium

Halobacillus karajensis is a species of bacteria. It is halophilic, Gram-positive, spore-forming, strictly aerobic and rod-shaped. Its type strain is MA-2^{T} (=DSM 14948^{T} =LMG 21515^{T}). Halobacillus karajensis is commonly found in marine environment. S.I. Paul et al. (2021) isolated and characterized Halobacillus karajensis from marine sponges of the Saint Martin's Island of the Bay of Bengal, Bangladesh.
