= Thermotalea =

Scientific classification
- Domain: Bacteria
- Kingdom: Bacillati
- Phylum: Bacillota
- Class: Clostridia
- Order: Eubacteriales
- Family: Clostridiaceae
- Genus: Thermotalea; Ogg and Patel 2009
- Species: T. metallivorans

Binomial name
- Thermotalea metallivorans Ogg & Patel 2009

Genus of bacteria

Thermotalea is a strictly anaerobic and thermophilic genus of bacteria from the family of Clostridiaceae with one known species (Thermotalea metallivorans). Thermotalea metallivorans has been isolated from microbial mats from the Great Artesian Basin.
