= Brassicibacter mesophilus =

Scientific classification
- Domain: Bacteria
- Kingdom: Bacillati
- Phylum: Bacillota
- Class: Clostridia
- Order: Tissierellales
- Family: Thermohalobacteraceae
- Genus: Brassicibacter
- Species: B. mesophilus

Binomial name
- Brassicibacter mesophilus Fang et al. 2012

Type strain
- BM

Species of bacterium

Brassicibacter mesophilus is a Gram-negative, mesophilic, strictly anaerobic, non-spore-forming and motile bacterium from the genus Brassicibacter which has been isolated from food industry wastewater.
