= Inediibacterium =

Scientific classification
- Domain: Bacteria
- Kingdom: Bacillati
- Phylum: Bacillota
- Class: Clostridia
- Order: Eubacteriales
- Family: Clostridiaceae
- Genus: Inediibacterium; Alou et al. 2017

Type species
- "Inediibacterium massiliense" Alou et al. 2017

Species
- I. massiliense

Genus of bacteria

Inediibacterium is a Gram-positive, spore-forming, and strictly anaerobic bacterial genus from the family of Clostridiaceae with one known species (Inediibacterium massiliense). It was isolated from the gut flora of an undernourished infant.

== Phylogeny ==
The currently accepted taxonomy is based on the List of Prokaryotic names with Standing in Nomenclature (LPSN) and National Center for Biotechnology Information (NCBI)

120 marker proteins based GTDB 09-RS220

- "Inediibacterium"
  - "I. massiliense" Alou et al. 2017
  - "Anaerophilus nitritogenes" Zhang et al. 2020
