= Alkaliphilus =

Scientific classification
- Domain: Bacteria
- Kingdom: Bacillati
- Phylum: Bacillota
- Class: Clostridia
- Order: Peptostreptococcales
- Family: Natronincolaceae
- Genus: Alkaliphilus; Takai et al. 2001

Type species
- Alkaliphilus transvaalensis Takai et al. 2001

Species
- See text

Synonyms
- Alkalliphilus

Genus of bacteria

Alkaliphilus is a bacterium from the family of Natronincolaceae.

== Phylogeny ==
The currently accepted taxonomy is based on the List of Prokaryotic names with Standing in Nomenclature (LPSN) and National Center for Biotechnology Information (NCBI)

16S rRNA based LTP_10_2024

- - - Serpentinicella alkaliphila Mei et al. 2016
    - "Alkaliphilus pronyensis" Postec et al. 2020
  - - Alkaliphilus
      - - A. oremlandii Fisher et al. 2009
        - - A. flagellatus Li et al. 2022
          - A. halophilus Wu et al. 2010
      - - A. hydrothermalis Ben Aissa et al. 2017
        - - - A. crotonatoxidans Cao, Liu & Dong 2003
            - "A. serpentinus" Postec et al. 2020
          - - A. transvaalensis Takai et al. 2001
            - - A. namsaraevii Zakharyuk et al. 2017
              - A. peptidifermentans corrig. Zhilina et al. 2009

120 marker proteins based GTDB 09-RS220

- Alkaliphilus
  - - "A. metalliredigens" Ye et al. 2004
    - - A. flagellatus
      - A. oremlandii
  - - - A. hydrothermalis
      - A. transvaalensis
    - - "A. serpentinus"
      - - A. peptidifermentans
        - "A. pronyensis"
