= Pontibacillus salicampi =

Scientific classification
- Domain: Bacteria
- Kingdom: Bacillati
- Phylum: Bacillota
- Class: Bacilli
- Order: Bacillales
- Family: Bacillaceae
- Genus: Pontibacillus
- Species: P. salicampi

Binomial name
- Pontibacillus salicampi Lee et al. 2015

Type strain
- KACC 17607, NBRC 109831, NCAIM B.02529, BH043

Species of bacterium

Pontibacillus salicampi is a Gram-positive, moderately halophilic and motile bacterium from the genus of Pontibacillus which has been isolated from soil from a saltern from Gomso in Korea.
