= Amphibacillus xylanus =

Scientific classification
- Domain: Bacteria
- Kingdom: Bacillati
- Phylum: Bacillota
- Class: Bacilli
- Order: Bacillales
- Family: Bacillaceae
- Genus: Amphibacillus
- Species: A. xylanus

Binomial name
- Amphibacillus xylanus Niimura et al., 1990

Species of bacterium

Amphibacillus xylanus is a gram-positive-spore forming bacterium with cells 0.3 μm to 0.5 μm in diameter and 0.9 μm to 1.9 μm in length. A. xylanus is a facultative anaerobic organism which can grow in several different environments. Its success in a multitude of environments stems from multiple metabolic pathways, each with high ATP yields. It is flagellated and motile. It grows best at pH 8.0-10.0 but not at pH 7.0. It is catalase and oxidase negative. This helps to explain better the unique method of metabolism on which the organism relies.

The cells have meso-diaminopimelic acid. The cellular fatty acids consists of iso-branched and anteiso-branched acids and considerable amounts of straight-chain acids. The DNA base composition of these strains ranged from 36 to 38 G+C % (guanine plus cytosine). This in combination with DNA homology determined that A. xylanus was not related to strains of representative species of the genera bacillus, clostridium, and sporolactobacillus. Considering these and its unique metabolism along with 5S rRNA (ribosomal RNA) sequencing the bacterium is hard to relate to other bacteria in its taxonomic schemes as so little of its genome matched any other bacterium.

== Metabolism ==
Amphibacillus xylanus grows well in alkaline media. It is capable of digesting xylan aerobically and anaerobically. Different reducing agents do not seem to affect it. Under anaerobic conditions the bacterium is a heterofermentator producing ethanol, and formic acid. It will produce acetic acid if maintained in aerobic conditions. Because some of its fermentative products are electrochemically active, A. xylanus is being researched for use in self-recycling voltaic cells.

== Oxidation Damage Prevention ==
The AhpC protein functions with a 55 kDA flavoprotein to protect the cell from oxidative damage. The protein functions like a NADH oxidase-AhPC system and because of its two disulfide bonded linkages it is able to function in the homodimer form. It is this enzyme that allows A. xylanus to sustain itself in harsh environments.
