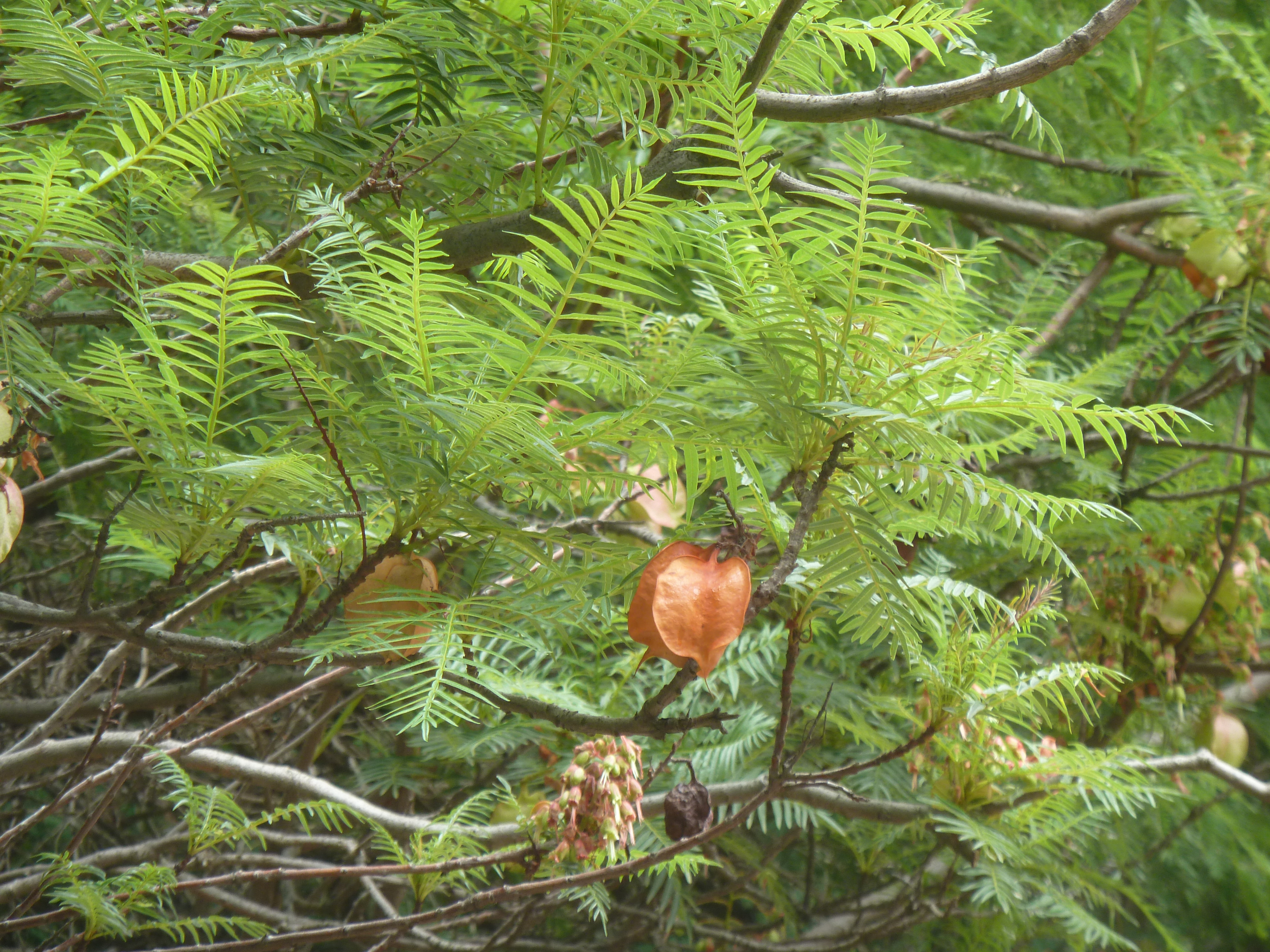
- Erythrophysa transvaalensis

Scientific classification
- Kingdom: Plantae
- Clade: Tracheophytes
- Clade: Angiosperms
- Clade: Eudicots
- Clade: Rosids
- Order: Sapindales
- Family: Sapindaceae
- Subfamily: Sapindoideae
- Genus: Erythrophysa; E.Mey. ex Harv. & Sond.

Synonyms
- Erythrophysopsis Verdc.

= Erythrophysa =

Genus of flowering plants

Erythrophysa is a genus of plant in the family Sapindaceae.

It contains the following species (but this list may be incomplete):

- Erythrophysa aesculina Baill.
- Erythrophysa alata (Eckl. & Zeyh.) Hutch.
- Erythrophysa belinii Capuron
- Erythrophysa humbertii Capuron
- Erythrophysa lapiazicola Capuron
- Erythrophysa paniculata Capuron
- Erythrophysa sakalava Capuron
- Erythrophysa septentrionalis Verdc.
- Erythrophysa transvaalensis I.Verd.
