= Thalassobacillus devorans =

Scientific classification
- Domain: Bacteria
- Kingdom: Bacillati
- Phylum: Bacillota
- Class: Bacilli
- Order: Bacillales
- Family: Bacillaceae
- Genus: Thalassobacillus
- Species: T. devorans

Binomial name
- Thalassobacillus devorans García et al. 2005

Type strain
- CCM 7282, CECT 7046, CIP 108959, DSM 16966, G-19.1

Synonyms
- Halobacillus degradans

Species of bacterium

Thalassobacillus devorans is a Gram-positive, oxidase positive, catalase negative, rod shaped moderately halophilic and phenol-degrading bacterium from the genus of Thalassobacillus which has been isolated from saline sals from Spain. Single colonies are small (pin headed) in size. S.I. Paul et al. (2021) isolated and biochemically characterized Thalassobacillus devorans (strains WS8, WS24, WS31) from marine sponge (Haliclona rosea) of the Saint Martin's Island of the Bay of Bengal, Bangladesh. They can hydrolyze gelatin, Tween 40, 60 and 80. They can produce acid from Glycerol, Galactose, D-Glucose, D-Fructose, D-Mannose, Mannitol, N-Acetylglucosamine, Amygdalin, Maltose, D-Melibiose, D-Trehalose, Glycogen, D-Turanose.
