= Natronincola ferrireducens =

Scientific classification
- Domain: Bacteria
- Kingdom: Bacillati
- Phylum: Bacillota
- Class: Clostridia
- Order: Peptostreptococcales
- Family: Natronincolaceae
- Genus: Natronincola
- Species: N. ferrireducens

Binomial name
- Natronincola ferrireducens Zavarzina et al. 2009

Type strain
- Z-0511

Species of bacterium

Natronincola ferrireducens is an anaerobic, obligately alkaliphilic, spore-forming and rod-shaped bacterium from the genus Natronincola.
