= Pontibacillus chungwhensis =

Scientific classification
- Domain: Bacteria
- Kingdom: Bacillati
- Phylum: Bacillota
- Class: Bacilli
- Order: Bacillales
- Family: Bacillaceae
- Genus: Pontibacillus
- Species: P. chungwhensis

Binomial name
- Pontibacillus chungwhensis Lim et al. 2005

Type strain
- BH030062, DSM 16287, KCTC 3890

Species of bacterium

Pontibacillus chungwhensis is a Gram-positive, moderately halophilic, spore-forming bacterium from the genus of Pontibacillus which has been isolated from soil from a saltern in Korea.
