= Halobacillus kuroshimensis =

Scientific classification
- Domain: Bacteria
- Kingdom: Bacillati
- Phylum: Bacillota
- Class: Bacilli
- Order: Bacillales
- Family: Halobacillaceae
- Genus: Halobacillus
- Species: H. kuroshimensis

Binomial name
- Halobacillus kuroshimensis Hua et al., 2007

Halophilic bacteria

Halobacillus kuroshimensis is a gram positive, oxidase positive, catalase negative, rod shaped marine bacteria.

S.I. Paul et al. (2021) isolated and characterized Halobacillus kuroshimensis from marine sponges of the Saint Martin's Island of the Bay of Bengal, Bangladesh. Its type strain is DSM 18393; IS-Hb7; JCM 14155.
