= Caldanaerocella =

Scientific classification
- Domain: Bacteria
- Kingdom: Bacillati
- Phylum: Bacillota
- Class: Clostridia
- Order: Eubacteriales
- Family: Clostridiaceae
- Genus: Caldanaerocella; Diaz et al. 2004

Type species
- "Caldanaerocella colombiensis" Diaz et al. 2004

Species
- "C. colombiensis"

Genus of bacteria

Caldanaerocella is a bacterial genus from the family Clostridiaceae, with one known species, Caldanaerocella colombiensis.
