= Alkaliphilus transvaalensis =

Scientific classification
- Domain: Bacteria
- Kingdom: Bacillati
- Phylum: Bacillota
- Class: Clostridia
- Order: Peptostreptococcales
- Family: Natronincolaceae
- Genus: Alkaliphilus
- Species: A. transvaalensis

Binomial name
- Alkaliphilus transvaalensis Takai et al. 2001

Species of bacterium

Alkaliphilus transvaalensis is an extremely alkaliphilic bacterium. Its cells are straight to slightly curved rods, motile by flagella and form endospores. Its type strain is SAGM1^{T} (= JCM 10712^{T} = ATCC 700919^{T}).
