= Proteiniclasticum =

Scientific classification
- Domain: Bacteria
- Kingdom: Bacillati
- Phylum: Bacillota
- Class: Clostridia
- Order: Eubacteriales
- Family: Clostridiaceae
- Genus: Proteiniclasticum; Zhang, Song & Dong 2010

Type species
- Proteiniclasticum ruminis Zhang, Song & Dong 2010

Species
- P. aestuarii; P. ruminis; "P. sediminis"

Genus of bacteria

Proteiniclasticum is a strictly anaerobic and proteolytic genus of bacteria from the family of Clostridiaceae with one known species (Proteiniclasticum ruminis). Proteiniclasticum ruminis has been isolated from the content of a yak rumen.

== Phylogeny ==
The currently accepted taxonomy is based on the List of Prokaryotic names with Standing in Nomenclature (LPSN) and National Center for Biotechnology Information (NCBI)

16S rRNA based LTP_10_2024

- Proteiniclasticum
  - P. aestuarii
  - P. ruminis

120 marker proteins based GTDB 09-RS220

- Proteiniclasticum
  - "P. sediminis" Liu et al. 2021
  - - P. aestuarii Namirimu et al. 2022
    - P. ruminis Zhang, Song & Dong 2010

== See also ==
- List of bacterial orders
- List of bacteria genera
