= Gottschalkia =

Scientific classification
- Domain: Bacteria
- Kingdom: Bacillati
- Phylum: Bacillota
- Class: Clostridia
- Order: Tissierellales
- Family: Gottschalkiaceae
- Genus: Gottschalkia; Poehlein et al. 2017

Type species
- Gottschalkia acidurici (Liebert 1909) Poehlein et al. 2017

Species
- Gottschalkia acidurici; Gottschalkia purinilytica

Genus of bacteria

Gottschalkia is a genus of bacteria in the order Tissierellales. The genus was first described from two species previously placed in the genus Clostridium.

== Phylogeny ==
The currently accepted taxonomy is based on the List of Prokaryotic names with Standing in Nomenclature (LPSN) and National Center for Biotechnology Information (NCBI)

16S rRNA based LTP_10_2024

- - Andreesenia angusta (Beuscher & Andreesen 1985) Poehlein et al. 2017c
  - - Gottschalkia
      - G. aciduricis (Liebert 1909) Poehlein et al. 2017
      - G. purinilytica (Durre, Andersch & Andreesen 1981) Poehlein et al. 2017

120 marker proteins based GTDB 09-RS220

- - Gottschalkia purinilytica
  - - Andreesenia angusta
    - Gottschalkia acidurici
