= Clostridium formicaceticum =

Scientific classification
- Domain: Bacteria
- Kingdom: Bacillati
- Phylum: Bacillota
- Class: Clostridia
- Order: Eubacteriales
- Family: Clostridiaceae
- Genus: Clostridium
- Species: C. formicaceticum

Binomial name
- Clostridium formicaceticum Andreesen et al. 1970

Synonyms
- Clostridium formicoaceticum

Species of bacterium

Clostridium formicaceticum (alternately spelled Clostridium formicoaceticum) is an anaerobic, motile, gram-positive bacterium.
