= Pontibacillus marinus =

Scientific classification
- Domain: Bacteria
- Kingdom: Bacillati
- Phylum: Bacillota
- Class: Bacilli
- Order: Bacillales
- Family: Bacillaceae
- Genus: Pontibacillus
- Species: P. marinus

Binomial name
- Pontibacillus marinus Lim et al. 2005

Type strain
- BH030004, DSM 16465, KCTC 3917

Species of bacterium

Pontibacillus marinus is a Gram-positive, moderately halophilic and rod-shaped bacterium from the genus of Pontibacillus which has been isolated from soil from a saltern in Korea.
