= Butyricicoccus pullicaecorum =

Scientific classification
- Domain: Bacteria
- Kingdom: Bacillati
- Phylum: Bacillota
- Class: Clostridia
- Order: Oscillospirales
- Family: Oscillospiraceae
- Genus: Butyricicoccus
- Species: B. pullicaecorum

Binomial name
- Butyricicoccus pullicaecorum Eeckhaut et al. 2008

Type strain
- CCUG 55265, strain 25-3, DSM 23266, LMG 24109

Species of bacterium

Butyricicoccus pullicaecorum is an anaerobic and butyrate-producing bacterium from the genus Butyricicoccus which has been isolated from the cecal content of a broiler chicken in Maldegem in Belgium.
