= Sporosalibacterium faouarense =

Scientific classification
- Domain: Bacteria
- Kingdom: Bacillati
- Phylum: Bacillota
- Class: Clostridia
- Order: Tissierellales
- Family: Thermohalobacteraceae
- Genus: Sporosalibacterium
- Species: S. faouarense

Binomial name
- Sporosalibacterium faouarense Rezgui et al. 2011

Type strain
- SOL3f37

Species of bacterium

Sporosalibacterium faouarense is a Gram-positive, strictly anaerobic, spore-forming, moderately halophilic, mesophilic and motile bacterium from the genus Sporosalibacterium which has been isolated from soil which was contaminated with hydrocarbons from Tunisia.
