= Piscibacillus salipiscarius =

Scientific classification
- Domain: Bacteria
- Kingdom: Bacillati
- Phylum: Bacillota
- Class: Bacilli
- Order: Bacillales
- Family: Bacillaceae
- Genus: Piscibacillus
- Species: P. salipiscarius

Binomial name
- Piscibacillus salipiscarius Tanasupawat et al. 2007

Type strain
- JCM 13188, PCU 270, TISTR 1571, RBU1-1

Synonyms
- Filobacillus salipiscarius

Species of bacterium

Piscibacillus salipiscarius is a Gram-positive, spore-forming, strictly aerobic moderately halophilic and motile bacterium from the genus of Piscibacillus which has been isolated from pla-ra in Thailand.
