= Lutispora =

Scientific classification
- Domain: Bacteria
- Kingdom: Bacillati
- Phylum: Bacillota
- Class: Clostridia
- Order: Eubacteriales
- Family: Clostridiaceae
- Genus: Lutispora; Shiratori et al. 2008

Type species
- Lutispora thermophila Shiratori et al. 2008

Species
- Lutispora saccharofermentans; Lutispora thermophila

Genus of bacteria

Lutispora is an anaerobic, spore-forming, rod-shaped and moderately thermophilic bacterial genus from the family Clostridiaceae.

== Phylogeny ==
The currently accepted taxonomy is based on the List of Prokaryotic names with Standing in Nomenclature (LPSN) and National Center for Biotechnology Information (NCBI)

16S rRNA based LTP_10_2024

- Lutispora
  - L. saccharofermentans El Houari et al. 2023
  - L. thermophila Shiratori et al. 2008

120 marker proteins based GTDB 09-RS220

- Lutispora
  - L. saccharofermentans
  - L. thermophila
