= Clostridium aceticum =

Scientific classification
- Domain: Bacteria
- Kingdom: Bacillati
- Phylum: Bacillota
- Class: Clostridia
- Order: Eubacteriales
- Family: Clostridiaceae
- Genus: Clostridium
- Species: C. aceticum

Binomial name
- Clostridium aceticum Gottschalk and Braun

Species of bacterium

Clostridium aceticum is a species of bacterium in the genus Clostridium. Its name comes from the acetic acid it produces. It was first described in 1981.
