= Gracilibacillus ureilyticus =

Scientific classification
- Domain: Bacteria
- Kingdom: Bacillati
- Phylum: Bacillota
- Class: Bacilli
- Order: Bacillales
- Family: Amphibacillaceae
- Genus: Gracilibacillus
- Species: G. ureilyticus

Binomial name
- Gracilibacillus ureilyticus Huo et al. 2010

Species of bacterium

Gracilibacillus ureilyticus is a Gram-positive, halotolerant, neutrophilic, rod-shaped bacterium. MF38^{T} (=CGMCC 1.7727^{T} =JCM 15711^{T}) is its type strain.
