= Gracilibacillus massiliensis =

Scientific classification
- Domain: Bacteria
- Kingdom: Bacillati
- Phylum: Bacillota
- Class: Bacilli
- Order: Bacillales
- Family: Amphibacillaceae
- Genus: Gracilibacillus
- Species: G. massiliensis

Binomial name
- Gracilibacillus massiliensis Diop et al. 2017

Type strain
- CSUR P1441, DSM 29726, train Awa-1

Species of bacterium

Gracilibacillus massiliensis is a moderately halophilic, Gram-positive, non-spore-forming and motile bacterium from the genus Gracilibacillus.
