= Desnuesiella =

Scientific classification
- Domain: Bacteria
- Kingdom: Bacillati
- Phylum: Bacillota
- Class: Clostridia
- Order: Eubacteriales
- Family: Clostridiaceae
- Genus: Desnuesiella; Hadjadj et al. 2016

Type species
- Desnuesiella massiliensis Hadjadj et al. 2016

Species
- D. massiliensis

Genus of bacteria

Desnuesiella is a Gram-positive and facultatively anaerobic bacterial genus from the family of Clostridiaceae with on known species (Desnuesiella massiliensis). Desnuesiella massiliensis has been isolated from the Gut flora from a child which suffered from kwashiorkor.

== See also ==
- List of bacterial orders
- List of bacteria genera
