= Fervidicella =

Scientific classification
- Domain: Bacteria
- Kingdom: Bacillati
- Phylum: Bacillota
- Class: Clostridia
- Order: Eubacteriales
- Family: Clostridiaceae
- Genus: Fervidicella; Ogg and Patel 2010
- Species: F. metallireducens

Binomial name
- Fervidicella metallireducens Ogg & Patel 2010

Genus of bacteria

Fervidicella is a Gram-negative, thermophilic and strictly anaerobic bacterial genus from the family Clostridiaceae with one known species (Fervidicella metallireducens). Fervidicella metallireducens has been isolated from microbial mats from the Great Artesian Basin.
