= Piscibacillus halophilus =

Scientific classification
- Domain: Bacteria
- Kingdom: Bacillati
- Phylum: Bacillota
- Class: Bacilli
- Order: Caryophanales
- Family: Bacillaceae
- Genus: Piscibacillus
- Species: P. halophilus

Binomial name
- Piscibacillus halophilus Amoozegar et al. 2009

Type strain
- CCM 7596, DSM 21633, JCM 15721, LMG 24786, HS224

Species of bacterium

Piscibacillus halophilus is a Gram-positive, rod-shaped, moderately halophilic and motile bacterium from the genus of Piscibacillus which has been isolated from water from the Howz Soltan Lake in Iran.
