= Halobacillus litoralis =

Scientific classification
- Domain: Bacteria
- Kingdom: Bacillati
- Phylum: Bacillota
- Class: Bacilli
- Order: Bacillales
- Family: Halobacillaceae
- Genus: Halobacillus
- Species: H. litoralis

Binomial name
- Halobacillus litoralis Spring et al. 1996

Species of bacterium

Halobacillus litoralis is a species of bacteria. It is halophilic, gram-positive, heterotrophic and its type strain is DSM 10405^{T} (= SL-4^{T}).
