= Brassicibacter thermophilus =

Scientific classification
- Domain: Bacteria
- Kingdom: Bacillati
- Phylum: Bacillota
- Class: Clostridia
- Order: Tissierellales
- Family: Thermohalobacteraceae
- Genus: Brassicibacter
- Species: B. thermophilus

Binomial name
- Brassicibacter thermophilus Wang et al. 2015

Type strain
- Cel2f

Species of bacterium

Brassicibacter thermophilus is a Gram-negative, thermophilic, obligately anaerobic, non-spore-forming and non-motile bacterium from the genus Brassicibacter.
