= Anaerosolibacter =

Scientific classification
- Domain: Bacteria
- Kingdom: Bacillati
- Phylum: Bacillota
- Class: Clostridia
- Order: Eubacteriales
- Family: Clostridiaceae
- Genus: Anaerosolibacter; Hong et al. 2015
- Species: A. carboniphilus

Binomial name
- Anaerosolibacter carboniphilus Hong et al. 2015

Genus of bacteria

Anaerosolibacter is a Gram-positive, strictly anaerobic, rod-shaped, mesophilic and motile bacterial genus from the family Clostridiaceae with one known species (Anaerosolibacter carboniphilus).
