= Anoxynatronum =

Scientific classification
- Domain: Bacteria
- Kingdom: Bacillati
- Phylum: Bacillota
- Class: Clostridia
- Order: Eubacteriales
- Family: Clostridiaceae
- Genus: Anoxynatronum; Garnova et al. 2003

Type species
- Anoxynatronum sibiricum Garnova & Zhilina 2003

Species
- Anoxynatronum buryatiense; Anoxynatronum sibiricum

Genus of bacteria

Anoxynatronum is a Gram-positive, non-spore-forming and moderately alkaliphilic bacterial genus from the family Clostridiaceae.
