= Caloranaerobacter ferrireducens =

Scientific classification
- Domain: Bacteria
- Kingdom: Bacillati
- Phylum: Bacillota
- Class: Clostridia
- Order: Tissierellales
- Family: Thermohalobacteraceae
- Genus: Caloranaerobacter
- Species: C. ferrireducens

Binomial name
- Caloranaerobacter ferrireducens Zeng et al. 2015

Type strain
- DY22619, DSM 27799, JCM 19467, MCCC1A06455

Species of bacterium

Caloranaerobacter ferrireducens is a Gram-negative, thermophilic, anaerobic, iron-reducing and motile bacterium from the genus Caloranaerobacter which has been isolated from hydrothermal sulfide deposits from the East Pacific Rise.
