= Pontibacillus yanchengensis =

Scientific classification
- Domain: Bacteria
- Kingdom: Bacillati
- Phylum: Bacillota
- Class: Bacilli
- Order: Bacillales
- Family: Bacillaceae
- Genus: Pontibacillus
- Species: P. yanchengensis

Binomial name
- Pontibacillus yanchengensis Yang et al. 2011

Type strain
- CCTCC AB209311, CGMCC 1.10680, NRRL B-59408, Y32

Species of bacterium

Pontibacillus yanchengensis is a Gram-positive, moderately halophilic and aerobic bacterium from the genus of Pontibacillus which has been isolated from soil from the Sanwei salt field from Yancheng in China.
