= Youngiibacter =

Scientific classification
- Domain: Bacteria
- Kingdom: Bacillati
- Phylum: Bacillota
- Class: Clostridia
- Order: Eubacteriales
- Family: Clostridiaceae
- Genus: Youngiibacter; Lawson et al. 2014

Type species
- Youngiibacter fragilis Lawson et al. 2014

Species
- Y. fragilis; Y. multivorans

Genus of bacteria

Youngiibacter is a genus of bacteria from the family of Clostridiaceae.

== Etymology ==
The name Youngiibacter is derived from "Youngia", a latinized version of the surname "Young" and "bacter", which is Latin for "rod" or "small staff". It is named after Lily Y. Young for her contributions to anaerobic hydrocarbon microbiology.

== See also ==
- List of bacterial orders
- List of bacteria genera
