= Oceanirhabdus =

Scientific classification
- Domain: Bacteria
- Kingdom: Bacillati
- Phylum: Bacillota
- Class: Clostridia
- Order: Eubacteriales
- Family: Clostridiaceae
- Genus: Oceanirhabdus; Pi et al. 2013

Type species
- Oceanirhabdus sediminicola Pi et al. 2013

Species
- O. sediminicola; "O. seepicola"

Genus of bacteria

Oceanirhabdus is a Gram-positive, spore-forming, rod-shaped and peritrichous genus of bacteria from the family of Clostridiaceae with one known species (Oceanirhabdus sediminicola). Oceanirhabdus sediminicola has been isolated from sediments from the South China Sea.

== See also ==
- List of bacterial orders
- List of bacteria genera
