= Butyricicoccus =

Scientific classification
- Domain: Bacteria
- Kingdom: Bacillati
- Phylum: Bacillota
- Class: Clostridia
- Order: Oscillospirales
- Family: Oscillospiraceae
- Genus: Butyricicoccus; Eeckhaut et al. 2008

Type species
- Butyricicoccus pullicaecorum Eeckhaut et al. 2008

Species
- B. faecihominis; B. intestinisimiae; B. porcorum; B. pullicaecorum

Genus of bacteria

Butyricicoccus is a bacterial genus from the family Oscillospiraceae, formerly ranked in the family of Clostridiaceae.

== Phylogeny ==
The currently accepted taxonomy is based on the List of Prokaryotic names with Standing in Nomenclature (LPSN) and National Center for Biotechnology Information (NCBI)

16S rRNA based LTP_10_2024

- - - Butyricicoccus species‑group 2
      - B. intestinisimiae
      - B. porcorum
  - - Butyricicoccus pullicaecorum
    - Agathobaculum [incl. Butyricicoccus faecihominis]

120 marker proteins based GTDB 09-RS220

- - - Butyricicoccus species‑group 2
      - B. intestinisimiae Li et al. 2022
      - - B. porcorum Trachsel et al. 2018
        - "Ca. B. stercorigallinarum" Gilroy et al. 2021
  - - - Butyricicoccus
        - "Ca. B. avistercoris" Gilroy et al. 2021
        - - "Ca. B. avicola" Gilroy et al. 2021
          - B. pullicaecorum Eeckhaut et al. 2008
    - - "Intestinibacillus"
      - Agathobaculum [incl. Butyricicoccus faecihominis
        Takada et al. 2016]

== See also ==
- List of bacterial orders
- List of bacteria genera
- Roseburia
