= Fonticella =

Scientific classification
- Domain: Bacteria
- Kingdom: Bacillati
- Phylum: Bacillota
- Class: Clostridia
- Order: Eubacteriales
- Family: Clostridiaceae
- Genus: Fonticella; Fraj et al. 2013
- Species: F. tunisiensis

Binomial name
- Fonticella tunisiensis Fraj et al. 2013

Genus of bacteria

Fonticella is a strictly anaerobic, moderately thermophilic, halotolerant and non-motile bacterial genus from the family Clostridiaceae with one known species (Fonticella tunisiensis). Fonticella tunisiensis has been isolated from water from a hot spring in Tunisia.
