= Oxobacter =

Scientific classification
- Domain: Bacteria
- Kingdom: Bacillati
- Phylum: Bacillota
- Class: Clostridia
- Order: Eubacteriales
- Family: Clostridiaceae
- Genus: Oxobacter; Collins et al. 1994
- Species: O. pfennigii

Binomial name
- Oxobacter pfennigii (Krumholz & Bryant 1985) Collins et al. 1994

Synonyms
- Clostridium pfennigii Krumholz and Bryant 1985

Genus of bacteria

Oxobacter is a genus of Gram-positive obligately anaerobic rod-shaped acetogenic bacteria. The sole species in the genus is Oxobacter pfennigii, formerly known as Clostridium pfennigii. This endospore-forming microorganism catabolizes pyruvate to acetate and CO_{2}, while sugars and amino acids are not utilized as energy sources.
