= Sporosalibacterium tautonense =

Scientific classification
- Domain: Bacteria
- Kingdom: Bacillati
- Phylum: Bacillota
- Class: Clostridia
- Order: Tissierellales
- Family: Thermohalobacteraceae
- Genus: Sporosalibacterium
- Species: S. tautonense

Binomial name
- Sporosalibacterium tautonense Podosokorskaya et al. 2017

Type strain
- MRo-4

Species of bacterium

Sporosalibacterium tautonense is a Gram-positive, strictly anaerobic, thermotolerant, moderately halophilic, organotrophic and motile bacterium from the genus Sporosalibacterium which has been isolated from water from the TauTona gold mine in South Africa.
