= Halobacillus trueperi =

Scientific classification
- Domain: Bacteria
- Kingdom: Bacillati
- Phylum: Bacillota
- Class: Bacilli
- Order: Bacillales
- Family: Halobacillaceae
- Genus: Halobacillus
- Species: H. trueperi

Binomial name
- Halobacillus trueperi Spring et al. 1996

Species of bacterium

Halobacillus trueperi is a species of bacteria. It is halophilic, gram-positive, heterotrophic and its type strain is DSM 10404^{T} (= SL-5^{T}).
