= Anaerobacter =

Scientific classification
- Domain: Bacteria
- Kingdom: Bacillati
- Phylum: Bacillota
- Class: Clostridia
- Order: Eubacteriales
- Family: Clostridiaceae
- Genus: Anaerobacter; Duda et al. 1996

Type species
- Anaerobacter polyendosporus Duda et al. 1996

Species
- Anaerobacter polyendosporus

Monotypic genus of bacteria

Anaerobacter is a genus of Gram-positive bacteria related to Clostridium. They are anaerobic chemotrophs and are unusual spore-formers as they produce more than one spore per bacterial cell (up to five). They fix nitrogen. Their G+C content is 29%. Only one species of this genus (Anaerobacter polyendosporus) has been described.

== See also ==
- List of bacterial orders
- List of bacteria genera
