= Gracilibacillus halotolerans =

Scientific classification
- Domain: Bacteria
- Kingdom: Bacillati
- Phylum: Bacillota
- Class: Bacilli
- Order: Bacillales
- Family: Amphibacillaceae
- Genus: Gracilibacillus
- Species: G. halotolerans

Binomial name
- Gracilibacillus halotolerans Wainø et al. 1999

Species of bacterium

Gracilibacillus halotolerans is a Gram-positive, extremely halotolerant bacteria, the type species of its genus. Its type strain is NN^{T} (= DSM 11805^{T}).
