= Tindallia =

Scientific classification
- Domain: Bacteria
- Kingdom: Bacillati
- Phylum: Bacillota
- Class: Clostridia
- Order: Eubacteriales
- Family: Clostridiaceae
- Genus: Tindallia; Kevbrin et al. 1999

Type species
- Tindallia magadiensis corrig. Kevbrin et al. 1999

Species
- Tindallia californiensis; Tindallia magadiensis; Tindallia texcoconensis

Genus of bacteria

Tindallia is a genus of bacteria from the family Clostridiaceae.

== Phylogeny ==
The currently accepted taxonomy is based on the List of Prokaryotic names with Standing in Nomenclature (LPSN) and National Center for Biotechnology Information (NCBI)

16S rRNA based LTP_10_2024

- Tindallia
  - T. texcoconensis Alazard et al. 2009
  - - T. californiensis Pikuta et al. 2003
    - T. magadiensis corrig. Kevbrin et al. 1999

120 marker proteins based GTDB 09-RS220

- Tindallia
  - T. californiensis
  - T. magadiensis
