= Acidaminobacter =

Scientific classification
- Domain: Bacteria
- Kingdom: Bacillati
- Phylum: Bacillota
- Class: Clostridia
- Order: Eubacteriales
- Family: Clostridiaceae
- Genus: Acidaminobacter; Stams & Hansen 1985
- Species: A. hydrogenoformans

Binomial name
- Acidaminobacter hydrogenoformans Stams & Hansen 1985

Genus of bacteria

Acidaminobacter is a genus in the phylum Bacillota (Bacteria).

== Etymology ==
The name Acidaminobacter derives from Neo-Latin acidum aminum, amino acid, a rod bacter, nominally meaning "a rod", but in effect meaning a bacterium, a staff or rod; resulting in Acidaminobacter, the amino acid rod bacterium.

== Species ==
The genus contains a single species, Acidaminobacter hydrogenoformans. The specific name is based on New Latin hydrogenum (from Greek húdōr (ὕδωρ), water; and gennaō (γεννάω), to produce) hydrogen (that which produces water, so called because it forms water when exposed to oxygen); Latin formans, forming, giving hydrogen-forming.)
