= Paramaledivibacter caminithermalis =

Scientific classification
- Domain: Bacteria
- Kingdom: Bacillati
- Phylum: Bacillota
- Class: Clostridia
- Order: Peptostreptococcales
- Family: Peptostreptococcaceae
- Genus: Paramaledivibacter
- Species: P. caminithermalis

Binomial name
- Paramaledivibacter caminithermalis (Brisbarre et al. 2003) Li et al. 2016

Synonyms
- Clostridium caminithermale

Species of bacterium

Paramaledivibacter caminithermalis is a species of bacteria in the family Peptostreptococcaceae. Clostridium caminithermale has been reclassified to Paramaledivibacter caminithermalis. Paramaledivibacter caminithermalis has been isolated from a deep-sea hydrothermal vent from the Atlantic Ocean Ridge.
