= Gracilibacillus boraciitolerans =

Scientific classification
- Domain: Bacteria
- Kingdom: Bacillati
- Phylum: Bacillota
- Class: Bacilli
- Order: Bacillales
- Family: Amphibacillaceae
- Genus: Gracilibacillus
- Species: G. boraciitolerans

Binomial name
- Gracilibacillus boraciitolerans Ahmed et al. 2007

Species of bacterium

Gracilibacillus boraciitolerans is a highly boron-tolerant and moderately halotolerant bacterium. It is motile, Gram-positive and rod-shaped. T-16XT (=DSM 17256^{T} =IAM15263^{T} =ATCCBAA-1190^{T}) is its type strain.
