= Paraliobacillus =

Scientific classification
- Domain: Bacteria
- Kingdom: Bacillati
- Phylum: Bacillota
- Class: Bacilli
- Order: Bacillales
- Family: Bacillaceae
- Genus: Paraliobacillus; Ishikawa et al. 2003

Type species
- Paraliobacillus ryukyuensis Ishikawa et al. 2003

Species
- P. quinghaiensis; P. ryukyuensis; P. salinarum; P. sediminis; P. zengyii

Synonyms
- Medilactobacillus

Genus of bacteria

Paraliobacillus is a Gram-positive, facultatively anaerobic and endospore-forming genus of bacteria from the family of Bacillaceae.

== Phylogeny ==
The currently accepted taxonomy is based on the List of Prokaryotic names with Standing in Nomenclature (LPSN) and National Center for Biotechnology Information (NCBI).

16S rRNA based LTP_10_2024

- - - Paraliobacillus
      - P. ryukyuensis Ishikawa et al. 2003
      - P. salinarum Yin et al. 2021
  - - Saliterribacillus
    - - - - Alkalilactibacillus
          - Natronobacillus
        - - Paraliobacillus~
            - Paraliobacillus sediminis Cao et al. 2017
            - Paraliobacillus zengyii Wang et al. 2019
      - - Paraliobacillus quinghaiensis Chen et al. 2009
        - other

120 marker proteins based GTDB 09-RS220

- Paraliobacillus
  - - P. ryukyuensis
    - P. salinarum
  - - P. quinghaiensis
    - P. zengyii

== See also ==
- List of Bacteria genera
- List of bacterial orders
