= Exosporium =

The exosporium is the outer surface layer of mature spores. In plant spores it is also referred to as the exine. Some bacteria also produce endospores with an exosporium, of which the most commonly studied are Bacillus species, particularly Bacillus cereus and the anthrax-causing bacterium Bacillus anthracis. The exosporium is the portion of the spore that interacts with the environment or host organism, and may contain spore antigens. Exosporium proteins, such as Cot protein, are also found in strains of B. anthracis and B. cereus. These Cot proteins share similar sequences with other spore coat proteins, and their putative determinants are believed to include bxpC, iunA, exsA, etc.

In Bacillus anthracis, salt and detergent washing of exosporium fragments can identify proteins that are likely to represent structural or integral exosporium proteins. Seven proteins have been identified in washed exosporium: alanine racemase, inosine hydrolase, ExsF, CotY, ExsY, CotB, and a novel protein, ExsK. CotY, ExsY and CotB are homologues of Bacillus subtilis outer spore coat proteins, but ExsF and ExsK are specific to B. anthracis and other members of the Bacillus cereus group.

The protein YwdL has been identified in B. cereus as important for exosporium formation. In the absence of the ywdL gene, a fragile and easily damaged exosporium is formed, which can be damaged by mechanical disruption such as freeze-thaw cycles. However, ywdL is not required to maintain the internal organization of the exosporium. ΔywdL (Note: Spores with a genetic deletion of ywdL) spores have abnormal germination properties, such as the inability to respond to standard chemical means of inducing germination by treatment with calcium dipicolinate.
