= Marinisporobacter =

Scientific classification
- Domain: Bacteria
- Kingdom: Bacillati
- Phylum: Bacillota
- Class: Clostridia
- Order: Eubacteriales
- Family: Clostridiaceae
- Genus: Marinisporobacter; Vandieken et al. 2017

Type species
- Marinisporobacter balticus Vandieken et al. 2017

Species
- M. balticus

Genus of bacteria

Marinisporobacter is a Gram-positive and endospore-forming bacterial genus from the family of Clostridiaceae with one known species (Marinisporobacter balticus).

== See also ==
- List of bacterial orders
- List of bacteria genera
