= Pontibacillus halophilus =

Scientific classification
- Domain: Bacteria
- Kingdom: Bacillati
- Phylum: Bacillota
- Class: Bacilli
- Order: Bacillales
- Family: Bacillaceae
- Genus: Pontibacillus
- Species: P. halophilus

Binomial name
- Pontibacillus halophilus Chen et al. 2009

Type strain
- CCTCC AA 207029, CIP 110065, DSM 19796, JSM 076056, KCTC 13190

Species of bacterium

Pontibacillus halophilus is a Gram-positive, moderately halophilic, strictly aerobic and motile bacterium from the genus of Pontibacillus which has been isolated from a sea urchin from the Laizhou Bay.
