= Salimesophilobacter =

Scientific classification
- Domain: Bacteria
- Kingdom: Bacillati
- Phylum: Bacillota
- Class: Clostridia
- Order: Eubacteriales
- Family: Clostridiaceae
- Genus: Salimesophilobacter; Zhang et al. 2013
- Species: S. vulgaris

Binomial name
- Salimesophilobacter vulgaris Zhang et al. 2013

Genus of bacteria

Salimesophilobacter is a Gram-positive, anaerobic, heterotrophic and motile genus of bacteria from the family Clostridiaceae with one known species (Salimesophilobacter vulgaris). Salimesophilobacter vulgaris has been isolated from wastewater from a paper mill in Zhejiang.
