= Caloramator =

Scientific classification
- Domain: Bacteria
- Kingdom: Bacillati
- Phylum: Bacillota
- Class: Clostridia
- Order: Eubacteriales
- Family: Clostridiaceae
- Genus: Caloramator; Collins et al. 1994

Type species
- Caloramator fervidus (Patel et al. 1987) Collins et al. 1994

Species
- C. australicus; C. boliviensis; C. coolhaasii; C. fervidus; C. indicus; C. mitchellensis; C. proteoclasticus; C. quimbayensis; "C. uzoniensis"; C. viterbiensis

Genus of bacteria

Caloramator, is a genus of bacteria belonging to the Bacillota.

== Phylogeny ==
The currently accepted taxonomy is based on the List of Prokaryotic names with Standing in Nomenclature (LPSN) and National Center for Biotechnology Information (NCBI)

16S rRNA based LTP_10_2024

- Caloramator
  - - C. viterbiensis corrig. Seyfried et al. 2002
    - - C. boliviensis Crespo et al. 2012
      - C. quimbayensis Rubiano-Labrador et al. 2013
  - - - C. coolhaasii Plugge, Zoetendal & Stams 2000
      - - C. celere (Engle et al. 1996) De Vos et al. 2009
        - - C. indicus Chrisostomos et al. 1996
          - C. proteoclasticus Tarlera et al. 1997
    - - C. mitchellensis Ogg & Patel 2011
      - - C. australicus Ogg & Patel 2009
        - C. fervidus (Patel et al. 1987) Collins et al. 1994

120 marker proteins based GTDB 09-RS220

- - - Caloramator species‑group 2
      - C. quimbayensis
  - - Thermobrachium
      - T. celere Engle et al. 1996
      - Caloramator proteoclasticus
    - Caloramator
      - C. mitchellensis
      - - C. australicus
        - C. fervidus
