= Sporosalibacterium =

Scientific classification
- Domain: Bacteria
- Kingdom: Bacillati
- Phylum: Bacillota
- Class: Clostridia
- Order: Tissierellales
- Family: Thermohalobacteraceae
- Genus: Sporosalibacterium; Rezgui et al. 2011

Type species
- Sporosalibacterium faouarense Rezgui et al. 2011

Species
- Sporosalibacterium faouarense; Sporosalibacterium tautonense

Genus of bacteria

Sporosalibacterium is a genus of bacteria from the family Thermohalobacteraceae.

== Phylogeny ==
The currently accepted taxonomy is based on the List of Prokaryotic names with Standing in Nomenclature (LPSN) and National Center for Biotechnology Information (NCBI)

16S rRNA based LTP_10_2024

- Sporosalibacterium
  - S. faouarense Rezgui et al. 2011
  - S. tautonense Podosokorskaya et al. 2017

120 marker proteins based GTDB 09-RS220

- Sporosalibacterium
  S. faouarense
