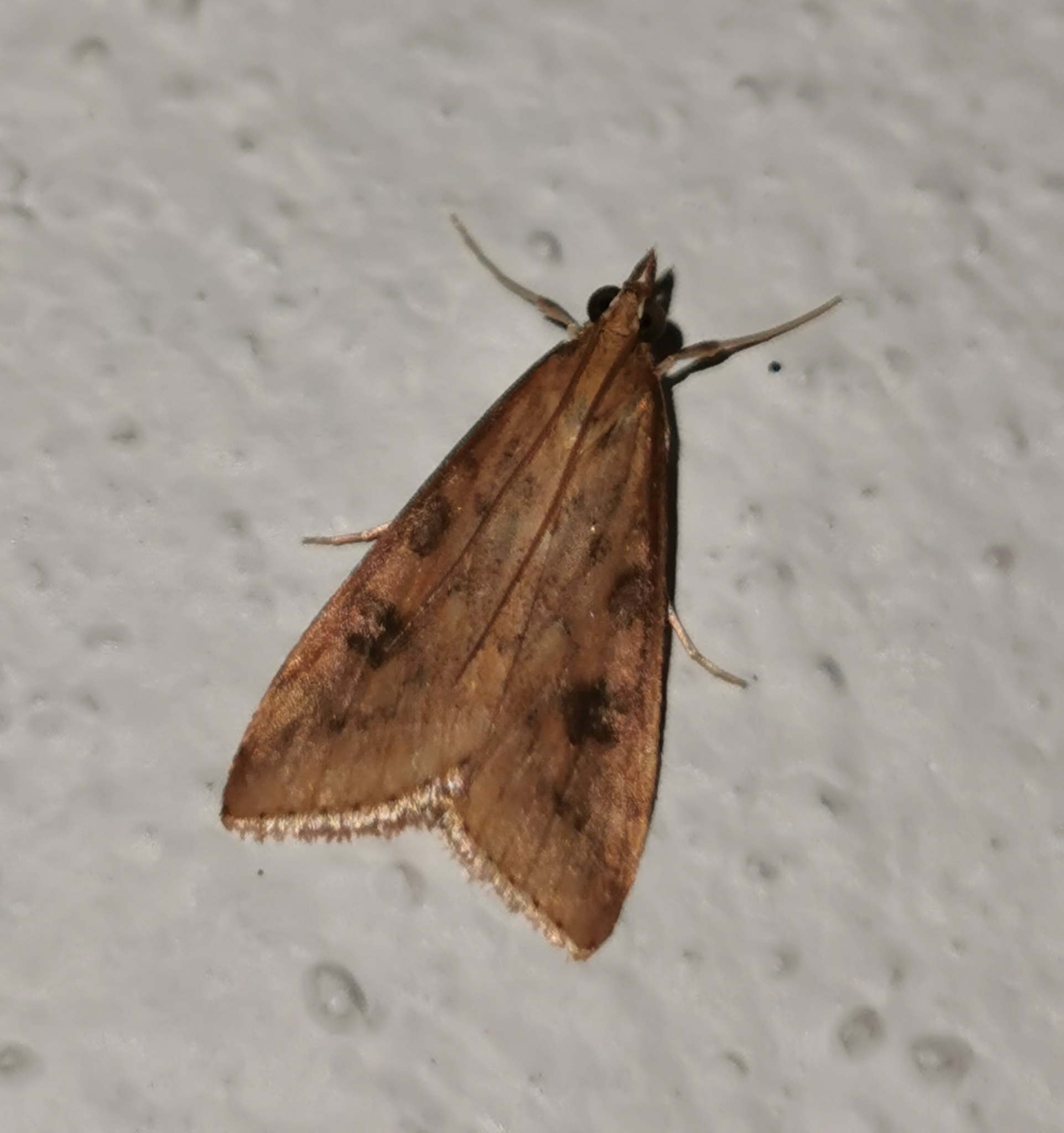

Scientific classification
- Kingdom: Animalia
- Phylum: Arthropoda
- Clade: Pancrustacea
- Class: Insecta
- Order: Lepidoptera
- Family: Crambidae
- Genus: Udea
- Species: U. azorensis

Binomial name
- Udea azorensis Meyer, Nuss & Speidel, 1997

= Udea azorensis =

Species of moth

Udea azorensis is a species of moth in the family Crambidae. It is found on the Azores.
