= Piscibacillus =

Scientific classification
- Domain: Bacteria
- Kingdom: Bacillati
- Phylum: Bacillota
- Class: Bacilli
- Order: Caryophanales
- Family: Bacillaceae
- Genus: Piscibacillus; Tanasupawat et al. 2007

Type species
- Piscibacillus salipiscarius Tanasupawat et al. 2007

Species
- P. halophilus; P. salipiscarius

Genus of bacteria

Piscibacillus is a genus of bacteria from the family of Bacillaceae.

== Phylogeny ==
The currently accepted taxonomy is based on the List of Prokaryotic names with Standing in Nomenclature (LPSN) and National Center for Biotechnology Information (NCBI).

16S rRNA based LTP_10_2024

- Piscibacillus
  - P. halophilus Amoozegar et al. 2009
  - P. salipiscarius Tanasupawat et al. 2007

120 marker proteins based GTDB 09-RS220

- Piscibacillus
  - P. halophilus Amoozegar et al. 2009
  - P. salipiscarius Tanasupawat et al. 2007

== See also ==
- List of bacterial orders
- List of bacteria genera
