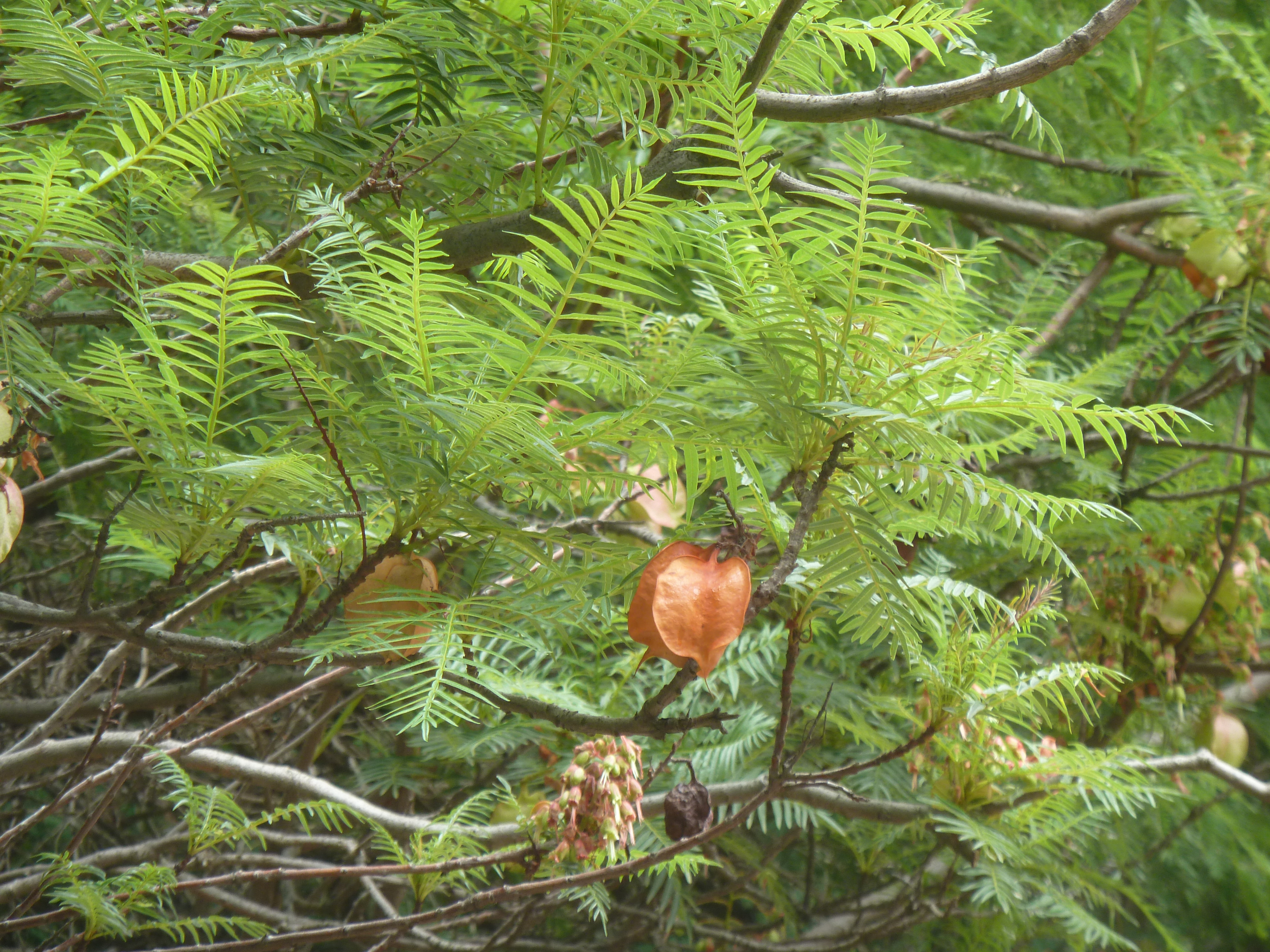

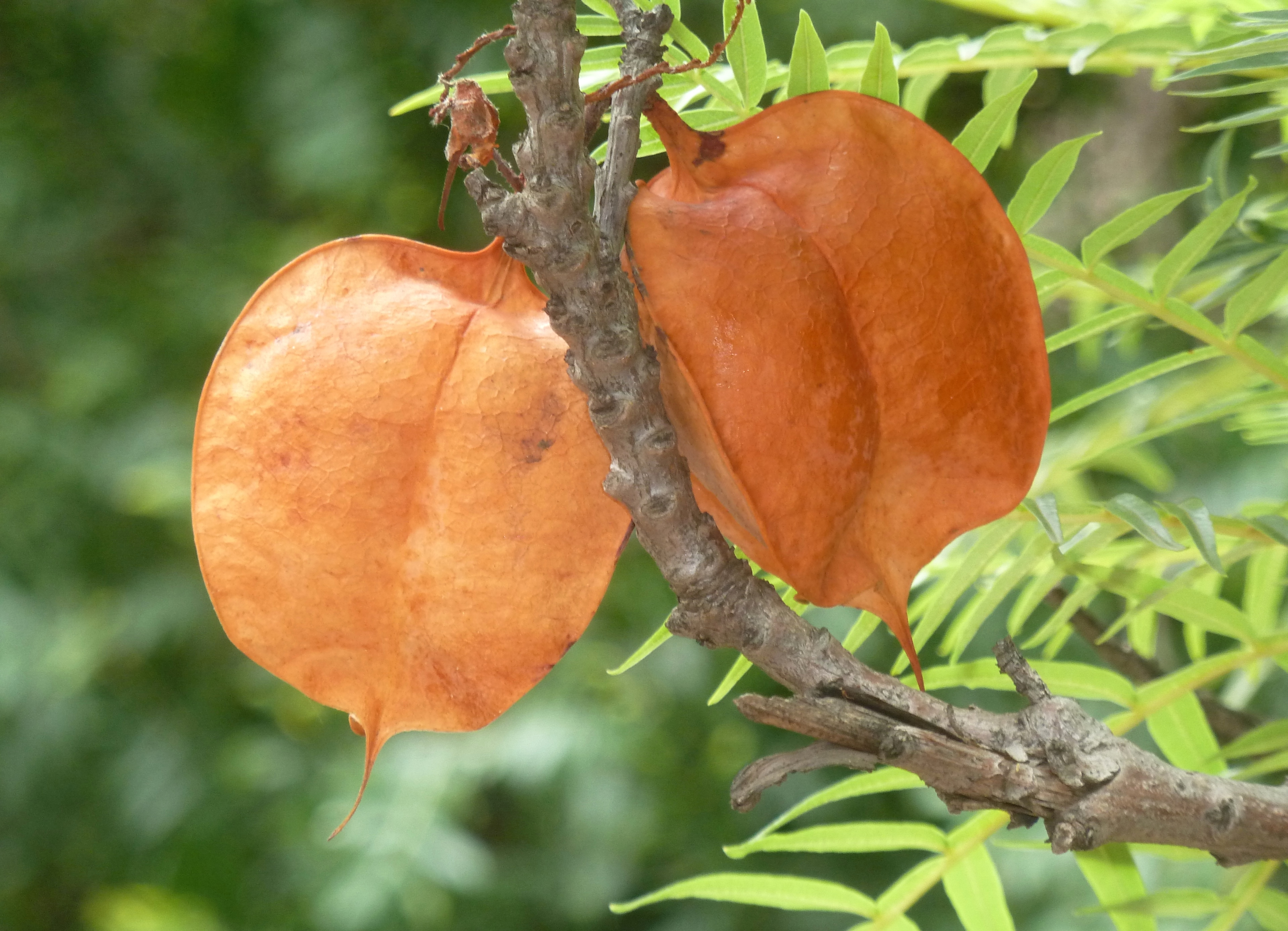

Conservation status
- Least Concern (IUCN 3.1)

Scientific classification
- Kingdom: Plantae
- Clade: Tracheophytes
- Clade: Angiosperms
- Clade: Eudicots
- Clade: Rosids
- Order: Sapindales
- Family: Sapindaceae
- Genus: Erythrophysa
- Species: E. transvaalensis

Binomial name
- Erythrophysa transvaalensis I.Verd.

= Erythrophysa transvaalensis =

Species of tree

Erythrophysa transvaalensis (Bushveld red balloon, Afrikaans: Bosveld-rooiklapperbos, Tswana: Mofalatsane) is a species of plant in the family Sapindaceae. It is a protected tree in South Africa. It is found in Botswana, South Africa, and Zimbabwe. Its range is disjunct however, so that suggestions have been made that its seeds were formerly employed as beads, which assisted its dispersal along ancient trade routes.
