= Amphibacillus =

Scientific classification
- Domain: Bacteria
- Kingdom: Bacillati
- Phylum: Bacillota
- Class: Bacilli
- Order: Bacillales
- Family: Bacillaceae
- Genus: Amphibacillus; Heyndrickx et al. 1998

Species
- A. cookii; "A. diazotrophicus"; "A. haojiensis"; A. iburiensis; A. indicireducens; A. jilinensis; A. marinus; A. sediminis; A. tropicus; A. xylanus

Genus of bacteria

Amphibacillus is a Gram-positive, spore-forming, rod-shaped and facultatively anaerobic genus of bacteria from the family of Bacillaceae. Amphibacillus have a low GC-content.

== Phylogeny ==
The currently accepted taxonomy is based on the List of Prokaryotic names with Standing in Nomenclature (LPSN) and National Center for Biotechnology Information (NCBI).

16S rRNA based LTP_10_2024

- Amphibacillus
  - - A. xylanus Niimura et al. 1990
    - - A. iburiensis Hirota, Aino & Yumoto 2013
      - A. indicireducens Hirota et al. 2013
  - - A. tropicus Zhilina et al. 2002
    - - A. sediminis An et al. 2007
      - - A. marinus Ren et al. 2013
        - - A. cookii Pugin et al. 2012
          - A. jilinensis Wu et al. 2010

120 marker proteins based GTDB 09-RS220

- Amphibacillus
  - - A. sediminis
    - A. xylanus
  - - A. marinus
    - - A. cookii
      - A. jilinensis

== See also ==
- List of Bacteria genera
- List of bacterial orders
