= Anaeromicrobium =

Scientific classification
- Domain: Bacteria
- Kingdom: Bacillati
- Phylum: Bacillota
- Class: Clostridia
- Order: Eubacteriales
- Family: Clostridiaceae
- Genus: Anaeromicrobium; Zhang et al. 2017
- Species: A. sediminis

Binomial name
- Anaeromicrobium sediminis Zhang et al. 2017

Genus of bacteria

Anaeromicrobium is an anaerobic, mesophilic and heterotrophic bacterial genus from the family Clostridiaceae, with one known species (Anaeromicrobium sediminis). Anaeromicrobium sediminis has been isolated from deep-sea sediments from the West Pacific Ocean.
