= Pontibacillus =

Scientific classification
- Domain: Bacteria
- Kingdom: Bacillati
- Phylum: Bacillota
- Class: Bacilli
- Order: Bacillales
- Family: Bacillaceae
- Genus: Pontibacillus; Lim et al. 2005

Type species
- Pontibacillus chungwhensis Lim et al. 2005

Species
- P. chungwhensis; P. halophilus; P. litoralis; P. marinus; P. salicampi; P. salipaludis; P. yanchengensis

Genus of bacteria

Pontibacillus is a Gram-positive, spore-forming and strictly aerobic genus of bacteria belonging to the family of Bacillaceae.

== Phylogeny ==
The currently accepted taxonomy is based on the List of Prokaryotic names with Standing in Nomenclature (LPSN) and National Center for Biotechnology Information (NCBI).

16S rRNA based LTP_10_2024

- Pontibacillus
  - - P. halophilus Chen et al. 2009
    - P. litoralis Chen et al. 2010
  - - - P. salicampi Lee et al. 2015
      - P. yanchengensis Yang et al. 2011
    - - P. marinus Lim et al. 2005
      - - P. chungwhensis Lim et al. 2005
        - P. salipaludis Sultanpuram et al. 2016

120 marker proteins based GTDB 09-RS220

- Pontibacillus
  - P. halophilus
  - - - P. litoralis
      - P. yanchengensis
    - - P. marinus
      - - P. chungwhensis
        - P. salipaludis

== See also ==
- List of bacterial orders
- List of bacteria genera
