= Anoxybacillus =

Scientific classification
- Domain: Bacteria
- Kingdom: Bacillati
- Phylum: Bacillota
- Class: Bacilli
- Order: Bacillales
- Family: Bacillaceae
- Genus: Anoxybacillus; Pikuta et al. 2000

Type species
- Anoxybacillus pushchinoensis corrig. Pikuta et al. 2000

Species
- See text

Genus of bacteria

Anoxybacillus is a genus of rod-shaped, spore-forming bacteria from the family of Bacillaceae. Anoxybacillus occur in geothermal springs, manure and milk processing plants.

== Phylogeny ==
The currently accepted taxonomy is based on the List of Prokaryotic names with Standing in Nomenclature (LPSN) and National Center for Biotechnology Information (NCBI).

16S rRNA based LTP_10_2024

- - Anoxybacillus sediminis Khan et al. 2019
  - - other
    - - Anoxybacillus
        - - (Thermaerobacillus)
            A. caldiproteolyticus Chen et al. 2004 ex Coorevits et al. 2012
          - (Anoxybacteroides)
            - - A. geothermale Filippidou et al. 20164
              - A. rupiense Derekova et al. 2008
            - - A. tepidamans (Schäffer et al. 2004) Coorevits et al. 2012
              - - A. amylolyticum Poli et al. 2006
                - - A. contaminans De Clerck et al. 2004
                  - A. voinovskiense Yumoto et al. 2004
        - - A. calidus Cihan et al. 2014
          - - A. vitaminiphilus Zhang et al. 2013
            - - A. bogrovensis Atanassova et al. 2008
              - - (Anoxybacillus)
                  - - - A. ayderensis Dulger, Demirbag & Belduz 2004
                      - A. salavatliensis Cihan, Ozcan & Cokmus 2011
                    - - Flavobacterium thermophilum Loginova & Egorova 1982
                      - - A. gonensis Belduz, Dulger & Demirbag 2003
                        - A. kamchatkensis Kevbrin et al. 2006
                  - - - A. kaynarcensis Inan, Belduz & Canakci 2013
                      - A. thermarum Poli et al. 2011
                    - - - A. karvacharensis Panosyan, Margaryan & Birkeland 2021
                        - A. kestanbolensis Dulger, Demirbag & Belduz 2004
                      - - A. flavithermus Heinen, Lauwers & Mulders 1982 ex Pikuta et al. 2000
                        - - A. pushchinoensis corrig. Pikuta et al. 2000
                          - - A. tengchongensis Zhang et al. 2011
                            - - A. flavithermus yunnanensis Dai et al. 2011
                              - - A. eryuanensis Zhang et al. 2011
                                - A. mongoliensis Namsaraev et al. 2011

120 marker proteins based GTDB 09-RS220

- - - Thermolongibacillus
    - - Anoxybacillus
        - A. pushchinoensis
        - - - A. ayderensis [A. salavatliensis]
            - - A. gonensis [A. kamchatkensis]
              - A. thermarum
          - - - A. kestanbolensis
              - A. flavithermus [A. karvacharensis]
            - - A. mongoliensis
              - A. tengchongensis ["A. suryakundensis" Deep, Poddar & Das 2013]
  - - - Paranoxybacillus
        - P. vitaminiphilus
        - Anoxybacillus calidus
      - - - Anoxybacteroides
            - A. rupiense
            - - A. tepidamans
              - - A. amylolyticum
                - A. voinovskiense
        - - Thermaerobacillus caldiproteolyticus
          - other

Unassigned species:

- "A. beppuensis" Muramatsu, Takamatsu & Nakashima 2005
- "A. hidirlerensis" Belduz, Inan & Canakci 2007
- "A. kualawohkensis" Azura et al. 2006 ex Paul et al. 2012
- "A. toebii" Bae et al. 2005
- "A. tunisiense" Sayeh et al. 2007

== See also ==
- List of Bacteria genera
- List of bacterial orders
