= Caldisalinibacter =

Scientific classification
- Domain: Bacteria
- Kingdom: Bacillati
- Phylum: Bacillota
- Class: Clostridia
- Order: Tissierellales
- Family: Thermohalobacteraceae
- Genus: Caldisalinibacter; Ben Hania et al. 2015
- Species: C. kiritimatiensis

Binomial name
- Caldisalinibacter kiritimatiensis Ben Hania et al. 2015

Type strain
- L21-TH-D2, DSM 26826, JCM 18664, L21-TH-D2

Genus of bacteria

Caldisalinibacter is a bacterial genus from the family Thermohalobacteraceae, with one known species, Caldisalinibacter kiritimatiensis.

Caldisalinibacter kiritimatiensis is a moderately thermohalophilic bacterium which has been isolated from the anoxic zone from the Kiritimati Atoll.
