= Geosporobacter =

Scientific classification
- Domain: Bacteria
- Kingdom: Bacillati
- Phylum: Bacillota
- Class: Clostridia
- Order: Eubacteriales
- Family: Clostridiaceae
- Genus: Geosporobacter; Klouche et al. 2007

Type species
- Geosporobacter subterraneus Klouche et al. 2007

Species
- Geosporobacter ferrireducens; Geosporobacter subterraneus

Genus of bacteria

Geosporobacter is a bacterial genus from the family Clostridiaceae.
