= Mitromorpha azorensis =

Scientific classification
- Kingdom: Animalia
- Phylum: Mollusca
- Class: Gastropoda
- Subclass: Caenogastropoda
- Order: Neogastropoda
- Superfamily: Conoidea
- Family: Mitromorphidae
- Genus: Mitromorpha
- Species: M. azorensis

Binomial name
- Mitromorpha azorensis Mifsud, 2001

Synonyms
- Mitromorpha (Mitrolumna) azorensis Mifsud, 2001

Species of gastropod

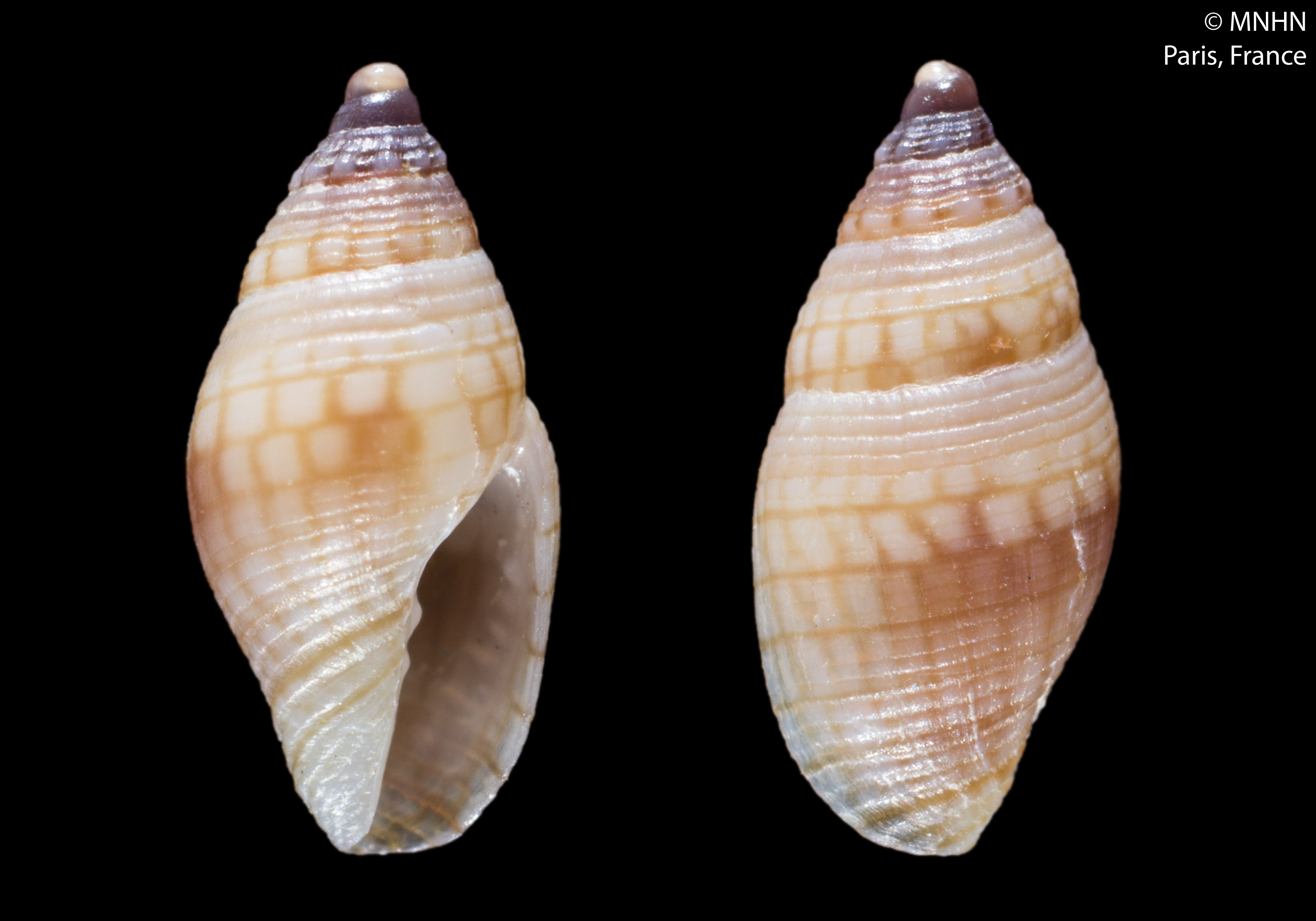

Mitromorpha azorensis is a species of sea snail, a marine gastropod mollusk in the family Mitromorphidae.

== Description ==
The length of the shell varies between 6 and 9 mm (0.24 and 0.35 in).

== Distribution ==
This marine species occurs off the Azores.
