= Thermohalobacter =

Scientific classification
- Domain: Bacteria
- Kingdom: Bacillati
- Phylum: Bacillota
- Class: Clostridia
- Order: Tissierellales
- Family: Thermohalobacteraceae
- Genus: Thermohalobacter; Cayol et al. 2000
- Species: T. berrensis

Binomial name
- Thermohalobacter berrensis Cayol et al. 2000

Genus of bacteria

Thermohalobacter is a Gram-negative, thermophilic, strictly halophilic, non-spore-forming anaerobic, rod-shaped and motile genus of bacteria from the family Thermohalobacteraceae with one known species, Thermohalobacter berrensis. Thermohalobacter berrensis has been isolated from a solar saltern.
