= Gracilibacillus =

Scientific classification
- Domain: Bacteria
- Kingdom: Bacillati
- Phylum: Bacillota
- Class: Bacilli
- Order: Bacillales
- Family: Amphibacillaceae
- Genus: Gracilibacillus; Wainø et al. 1999

Type species
- Gracilibacillus halotolerans Wainø et al. 1999

Species
- Seet text

Genus of bacteria

Gracilibacillus is a genus of bacteria within the phylum Bacillota. Species within this genus are generally halotolerant.

== Phylogeny ==
The currently accepted taxonomy is based on the List of Prokaryotic names with Standing in Nomenclature (LPSN) and National Center for Biotechnology Information (NCBI).

16S rRNA based LTP_10_2024

- Gracilibacillus
  - - G. bigeumensis Kim et al. 2012
    - G. halophilus Chen et al. 2008
  - - - G. dipsosauri (Lawson, Deutsch & Collins 1996) Wainø et al. 1999
      - - G. oryzae He et al. 2020
        - G. ureilyticus Huo et al. 2010
    - - - G. orientalis Carrasco et al. 2006
        - - G. kimchii Oh et al. 2021
          - G. timonensis Senghor et al. 2017 ex Diop et al. 2023
      - - - G. salitolerans Gan et al. 2020
          - - G. suaedae Huang, Xu & Sun 2021
            - - G. thailandensis Chamroensaksri et al. 2010
              - - G. lacisalsi Jeon et al. 2008
                - G. saliphilus Tang et al. 2009
        - - - - G. caseinilyticus Subramanian et al. 2023
              - G. salinarum Subramanian et al. 2023
            - - G. kekensis Gao et al. 2012
              - G. massiliensis Diop et al. 2017
          - - G. boraciitolerans Ahmed, Yokota & Fujiwara 2007
            - - G. marinus Huang et al. 2024
              - - G. alcaliphilus Hirota et al. 2014
                - G. halotolerans Wainø et al. 1999

120 marker proteins based GTDB 09-RS220

- Gracilibacillus
  - G. halotolerans
  - - - G. dipsosauri
      - - G. oryzae
        - G. ureilyticus
    - - G. halophilus
      - - - G. alcaliphilus
          - G. timonensis
        - - - G. boraciitolerans
            - - G. kekensis
              - G. massiliensis
          - - - G. lacisalsi [incl. G. saliphilus; G. thailandensis]
              - G. suaedae
            - - G. orientalis
              - G. salitolerans

Umassigned species:

- "G. aidingensis" Guan et al. 2017
- "G. eburneus" Guan et al. 2018
- "G. quinghaiensis" Chen et al. 2008
- "G. xinjiangensis" Yang et al. 2013

== See also ==
- List of Bacteria genera
- List of bacterial orders
