= Caminicella =

Scientific classification
- Domain: Bacteria
- Kingdom: Bacillati
- Phylum: Bacillota
- Class: Clostridia
- Order: Eubacteriales
- Family: Clostridiaceae
- Genus: Caminicella; Alain et al. 2002
- Species: C. sporogenes

Binomial name
- Caminicella sporogenes Alain et al. 2002

Genus of bacteria

Caminicella is a Gram-negative, anaerobic, thermophilic, heterotrophic, spore-forming, rod-shaped and motile bacterial genus from the family Clostridiaceae with one known species, Caminicella sporogenes.
