= Thalassobacillus =

Scientific classification
- Domain: Bacteria
- Kingdom: Bacillati
- Phylum: Bacillota
- Class: Bacilli
- Order: Bacillales
- Family: Bacillaceae
- Genus: Thalassobacillus; García et al. 2005

Type species
- Thalassobacillus devorans García et al. 2005

Species
- T. cyri; T. devorans; T. hwangdonensis; T. pellis

Genus of bacteria

Thalassobacillus is a Gram-positive, oxidase positive, catalase negative, rod shaped and moderately halophilic genus of bacteria from the family of Bacillaceae. Single colonies are small (pin headed) in size.Thalassobacillus bacteria produces Meso-diaminopimelic acid. S.I. Paul et al. (2021) isolated and biochemically characterized Thalassobacillus devorans from marine sponges of the Saint Martin's Island of the Bay of Bengal, Bangladesh.

== Phylogeny ==
The currently accepted taxonomy is based on the List of Prokaryotic names with Standing in Nomenclature (LPSN) and National Center for Biotechnology Information (NCBI).

16S rRNA based LTP_10_2024

- Thalassobacillus
  - T. hwangdonensis Lee et al. 2010
  - - T. pellis Sánchez-Porro et al. 2011
    - - T. cyri Sánchez-Porro et al. 2009
      - T. devorans García et al. 2005

120 marker proteins based GTDB 09-RS220

- Thalassobacillus
  - T. pellis Sánchez-Porro et al. 2011
  - - T. cyri Sánchez-Porro et al. 2009
    - T. devorans García et al. 2005

== See also ==
- List of Bacteria genera
- List of bacterial orders
