= Thermobrachium =

Scientific classification
- Domain: Bacteria
- Kingdom: Bacillati
- Phylum: Bacillota
- Class: Clostridia
- Order: Eubacteriales
- Family: Clostridiaceae
- Genus: Thermobrachium; Engle et al. 1996
- Species: T. celere

Binomial name
- Thermobrachium celere Engle et al. 1996

Synonyms
- "Caloramator celer" (Engle et al. 1996) De Vos et al. 2009

Genus of bacteria

Thermobrachium is an obligate anaerobic, moderately alkaliphilic, thermophilic and proteolytic genus of bacteria from the family Clostridiaceae with one known species (Thermobrachium celere).
