= Brassicibacter =

Scientific classification
- Domain: Bacteria
- Kingdom: Bacillati
- Phylum: Bacillota
- Class: Clostridia
- Order: Tissierellales
- Family: Thermohalobacteraceae
- Genus: Brassicibacter; Fang et al. 2012

Type species
- Brassicibacter mesophilus Fang et al. 2012

Species
- Brassicibacter mesophilus; Brassicibacter thermophilus

Genus of bacteria

Brassicibacter is a bacterial genus from the family Thermohalobacteraceae.

== Phylogeny ==
The currently accepted taxonomy is based on the List of Prokaryotic names with Standing in Nomenclature (LPSN) and National Center for Biotechnology Information (NCBI)

16S rRNA based LTP_10_2024

- Brassicibacter
  - Brassicibacter mesophilus Fang et al. 2012
  - Brassicibacter thermophilus Wang et al. 2015
