= Caloranaerobacter =

Scientific classification
- Domain: Bacteria
- Kingdom: Bacillati
- Phylum: Bacillota
- Class: Clostridia
- Order: Tissierellales
- Family: Thermohalobacteraceae
- Genus: Caloranaerobacter; Wery et al. 2001

Type species
- Caloranaerobacter azorensis Wery et al. 2001

Species
- Caloranaerobacter azorensis; Caloranaerobacter ferrireducens

Genus of bacteria

Caloranaerobacter is a Gram-negative, thermophilic, anaerobic and chemoorganotrophic bacterial genus from the family Thermohalobacteraceae.

== Phylogeny ==
The currently accepted taxonomy is based on the List of Prokaryotic names with Standing in Nomenclature (LPSN) and National Center for Biotechnology Information (NCBI)

16S rRNA based LTP_10_2024

- Caloranaerobacter
  - C. azorensis Wery et al. 2001
  - C. ferrireducens Zeng et al. 2015

120 marker proteins based GTDB 09-RS220

- Caloranaerobacter
  - C. azorensis
  - C. ferrireducens
