= Halobacillus =

Scientific classification
- Domain: Bacteria
- Kingdom: Bacillati
- Phylum: Bacillota
- Class: Bacilli
- Order: Bacillales
- Family: Halobacillaceae
- Genus: Halobacillus; Spring et al. 1996

Type species
- Halobacillus halophilus (Claus et al. 1984) Spring et al. 1996

Species
- See text

Genus of bacteria

Halobacillus is a bacterial genus from the family of Bacillaceae. Halobacillus species are gram positive, oxidase positive, catalase negative, rod shaped marine bacteria. S.I. Paul et al. (2021) isolated and characterized two species of Halobacillus (Halobacillus kuroshimensis and Halobacillus karajensis) from marine sponges (phylum: porifera) of the Saint Martin's Island of the Bay of Bengal, Bangladesh. Single colonies are pin headed (very small) in sized and opaque in color.

== Phylogeny ==
The currently accepted taxonomy is based on the List of Prokaryotic names with Standing in Nomenclature (LPSN) and National Center for Biotechnology Information (NCBI).

16S rRNA based LTP_10_2024

- - - Halobacillus~1
      - H. locisalis Yoon et al. 2004
      - H. salicampi Kim et al. 2016
  - - - Halobacillus~
        - H. kuroshimensis Hua et al. 2007
        - H. sediminis Kim et al. 2015
    - - - Halobacillus~2
          - - H. mangrovi Soto-Ramírez et al. 2008
            - - H. karajensis Amoozegar et al. 2003
              - - H. litoralis Spring et al. 1996
                - H. profundi Hua et al. 2007
          - - H. dabanensis Liu et al. 2005
            - - H. aidingensis Liu et al. 2005
              - - H. trueperi Spring et al. 1996
                - - H. faecis An et al. 2007
                  - H. yeomjeoni Yoon et al. 2005
      - - - Halobacillus
            - - - H. campisalis Yoon et al. 2007
                - H. seohaensis Yoon, Kang & Oh 2008
              - - H. alkaliphilus Romano et al. 2008
                - H. halophilus (Claus et al. 1984) Spring et al. 1996
            - - - H. fulvus Booncharoen et al. 2021
                - H. salinus Yoon, Kang & Park 2003
              - - - H. andaensis Wang et al. 2015
                  - H. salsuginis Chen et al. 2009
                - - H. naozhouensis Chen et al. 2012
                  - - H. amylolyticus Kim et al. 2023
                    - H. shinanisalinarum Kim et al. 2023
        - - Halobacillus salinarum Kim et al. 2023
          - Salimicrobium

120 marker proteins based GTDB 09-RS220

- Halobacillus
  - - - H. naozhouensis
      - - "H. hunanensis" Peng et al. 2009
        - "H. ihumii" Konate et al. 2020
    - - "H. massiliensis" Senghor et al. 2017
      - - H. andaensis
        - H. campisalis
  - - - H. alkaliphilus
      - H. halophilus
    - - - H. mangrovi
        - H. yeomjeoni
      - - - H. fulvus
          - - H. locisalis
            - H. salinus
        - - H. kuroshimensis
          - - H. dabanensis
            - - H. karajensis
              - - H. trueperi [incl. H. aidingensis]
                - - H. faecis
                  - H. litoralis

Unassigned species:

- "H. blutaparonensis" Barbosa et al. 2006
- "H. herbersteinensis" Ripka et al. 2005
- "H. marinus" Panda et al. 2018
- "H. rhizosphaerae" Yin et al. 2024
- "H. styriensis" Ripka 2005
- "H. thailandensis" Chaiyanan et al. 1999
- "H. virgiliensis" Ripka et al. 2005

== See also ==
- List of Bacteria genera
- List of bacterial orders
