= Wukongibacter =

Scientific classification
- Domain: Bacteria
- Kingdom: Bacillati
- Phylum: Bacillota
- Class: Clostridia
- Order: Peptostreptococcales
- Family: Peptostreptococcaceae
- Genus: Wukongibacter; Li et al. 2016

Type species
- Wukongibacter baidiensis Li et al. 2016

Species
- W. baidiensis

Genus of bacteria

Wukongibacter is a Gram-positive, spore-forming, rod-shaped, anaerobic and non-motile genus of bacteria from the family of Peptostreptococcaceae with one known species (Wukongibacter baidiensis).

== See also ==
- List of bacterial orders
- List of bacteria genera
