= Maledivibacter =

Scientific classification
- Domain: Bacteria
- Kingdom: Bacillati
- Phylum: Bacillota
- Class: Clostridia
- Order: Peptostreptococcales
- Family: Caminicellaceae
- Genus: Maledivibacter; Li et al. 2016
- Species: M. alophilus

Binomial name
- Maledivibacter alophilus (Fendrich, Hippe & Gottschalk 1991) Li et al. 2016

Synonyms
- Clostridium halophilum corrig. Fendrich et al. 1991

Genus of bacteria

Maledivibacter is a bacterial genus from the family Caminicellaceae with one known species, Maledivibacter halophilus. Clostridium halophilum has been reclassified to Maledivibacter halophilus.
