= Caloranaerobacter azorensis =

Scientific classification
- Domain: Bacteria
- Kingdom: Bacillati
- Phylum: Bacillota
- Class: Clostridia
- Order: Tissierellales
- Family: Thermohalobacteraceae
- Genus: Caloranaerobacter
- Species: C. azorensis

Binomial name
- Caloranaerobacter azorensis Wery et al. 2001

Type strain
- CNCM I-2543, DSM 13643, MV1087

Species of bacterium

Caloranaerobacter azorensis is a Gram-negative, thermophilic, anaerobic, chemoorganotrophic and motile bacterium from the genus Caloranaerobacter which has been isolated from a deep-sea hydrothermal vent from the Lucky Strike hydrothermal vent site from the Mid-Atlantic Ridge.
