= Paramaledivibacter =

Scientific classification
- Domain: Bacteria
- Kingdom: Bacillati
- Phylum: Bacillota
- Class: Clostridia
- Order: Peptostreptococcales
- Family: Peptostreptococcaceae
- Genus: Paramaledivibacter; Li et al. 2016

Type species
- Paramaledivibacter caminithermalis (Brisbarre et al. 2003) Li et al. 2016

Species
- P. caminithermalis

Genus of bacteria

Paramaledivibacter is a strictly anaerobic, slightly halophilic, non-spore-forming and moderately thermophilic genus of bacteria from the family of Peptostreptococcaceae with one known species (Paramaledivibacter caminithermalis).

== See also ==
- List of bacterial orders
- List of bacteria genera
