= Serpentinicella =

Scientific classification
- Domain: Bacteria
- Kingdom: Bacillati
- Phylum: Bacillota
- Class: Clostridia
- Order: Peptostreptococcales
- Family: Natronincolaceae
- Genus: Serpentinicella; Mei et al. 2016
- Species: S. alkaliphila

Binomial name
- Serpentinicella alkaliphila Mei et al. 2016

Genus of bacteria

Serpentinicella is a Gram-positive, anaerobic, alkaliphilic and spore-forming genus of bacteria from the family Natronincolaceae with one known species (Serpentinicella alkaliphila). Serpentinicella alkaliphila has been isolated from a hydrothermal vent from Prony Bay.
