= Clostridiisalibacter =

Scientific classification
- Domain: Bacteria
- Kingdom: Bacillati
- Phylum: Bacillota
- Class: Clostridia
- Order: Tissierellales
- Family: Thermohalobacteraceae
- Genus: Clostridiisalibacter; Liebgott et al. 2008
- Species: C. paucivorans

Binomial name
- Clostridiisalibacter paucivorans Liebgott et al. 2008

Genus of bacteria

Clostridiisalibacter is a Gram-positive moderately halophilic strictly anaerobic and motile bacterial genus from the family Thermohalobacteraceae with one known species, Clostridiisalibacter paucivorans. Clostridiisalibacter paucivorans has been isolated from olive mill wastewater from Marrakesh.
