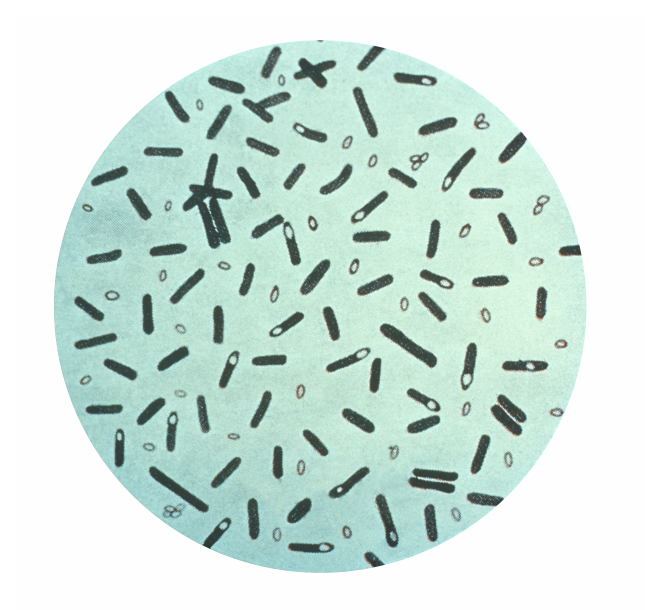
- Photomicrograph of Clostridium botulinum bacteria stained with crystal violet

Scientific classification
- Domain: Bacteria
- Kingdom: Bacillati
- Phylum: Bacillota
- Class: Clostridia
- Order: Eubacteriales
- Family: Clostridiaceae; Pribram 1933

Genera
- See text

Synonyms
- "Botulineae" Pribram 1929; "Botulinoideae" Pribram 1929; "Clostridioideae" corrig. Fischer 1897; "Plectridiaceae" Prévot 1938; "Plectridioideae" corrig. Fischer 1897; "Putrificeae" Pribram 1929; "Putrificoideae" Heller 1921; "Sarcinaceae" Skuja 1956; "Sarcineae" Trevisan 1889; "Sarcinidae" Enderlein 1917; "Sarcininae" corrig. Trevisan 1879; "Welchieae" Pribram 1929

= Clostridiaceae =

Family of bacteria

The Clostridiaceae are a family of the bacterial class Clostridia, and contain the genus Clostridium.

The family Clostridiaceae (scientific name) defined by the taxonomic outline of Bergey's Manual of Systematic Bacteriology contains as its core the genus Clostridium (sensu stricto), as well as Acetivibrio, Acidaminobacter, Alkaliphilus, Anaerobacter, Caloramator, Caloranaerobacter, Coprobacillus, Dorea, Natronincola, Oxobacter, Sarcina, Sporobacter, Thermobrachium, Thermohalobacter, and Tindallia. The previous inclusion of these additional genera (as seen on the right) in a family Clostridiaceae is based for the most part because the type species of these genera are in many cases phylogenetically related to misclassified species of the genus Clostridium. However, with the exception of Anaerobacter, Caloramator, Oxobacter, Sarcina, and Thermobrachium, these genera fall outside the radiation of what can be considered the true family Clostridiaceae and are now regarded as belonging to other families within the low G + C, Gram-positive phylum.

This misclassification is the result of well-known problems of the current taxonomic structure of the traditional genus Clostridium. The phylogenetic analysis of Collins (1994) was the first large-scale comparison of 16S rRNA gene sequences of species of the genus Clostridium and related taxa. The fact that the species of the genus Clostridium did not form a monophyletic group has been shown in a number of studies in which small groups of Clostridium species had been compared as far back as 1981. The comparative study of Collins (1994) and subsequent studies can be used to conclude that more than half of the species currently assigned to this genus are in fact not closely related to the type species, C. butyricum, and from a phylogenetic standpoint should not be included in a newly defined genus Clostridium.

This extensive genetic diversity of the genus Clostridium had been shown using 23S rRNA:DNA hybridization studies back in 1975 by Johnson and Francis, but the 16S rRNA gene sequence approach revealed the actual phylogenetic relationships between the species of this genus and other genera.

The genus Clostridium currently comprises 152 validly described species in nomenclature. However, on the basis of 16S rRNA gene sequence analyses, only 73 of these fall within the radiation of the type species of the genus Clostridium.

== Subdivisions ==
The polyphyletic family Clostridiaceae comprises the following:

LPSN & NCBI	16S rRNA based LTP_10_2024 & 120 marker proteins based GTDB 09-RS220
Acidaminobacter Stams & Hansen 1985; Agathobaculum Ahn et al. 2016; Alkaliphilus Takai et al. 2001; Anaeromicrobium Zhang et al. 2017; Anaeromonas Zhang et al. 2022; "Anaerophilus" Zhang et al. 2020; Anaerosolibacter Hong et al. 2015; Anaerovirgula Pikuta et al. 2006; Anoxynatronum Garnova & Zhilina 2003; "Ca. Arthromitus"; Brassicibacter Fang et al. 2012; Butyricicoccus Eeckhaut et al. 2008; Caldanaerocella Diaz et al. 2004; Caldisalinibacter Ben Hania et al. 2015; Caloramator Collins et al. 1994; Caloranaerobacter Wery et al. 2001; Caminicella Alain et al. 2002; Clostridiisalibacter Liebgott et al. 2008; Clostridium Trécul 1865 ex Prazmowski 1880; Crassaminicella Lakhal et al. 2015; "Desnuesiella" Hadjadj et al. 2016; Fervidicella Ogg & Patel 2010; Fonticella Fraj et al. 2013; Fusibacter Ravot et al. 1999; Geosporobacter Klouche et al. 2007; Haloimpatiens Wu et al. 2016; Hathewaya Lawson & Rainey 2016; "Inediibacterium" Alou et al. 2017; "Intestinibacillus" Ricaboni et al. 2017; Linmingia Ming, Nanqi & Yang 2002; Lutispora Shiratori et al. 2008; Maledivibacter Li et al. 2016; Marinisporobacter Vandieken et al. 2017; Natronincola Zhilina et al. 1999; Oceanirhabdus Pi et al. 2013; Oxobacter Collins et al. 1994; Paramaledivibacter Li et al. 2016; "Ca. Petromonas" Christman et al. 2020; Proteiniclasticum Zhang, Song & Dong 2010; "Ca. Pseudobutyricicoccus" Glendinning et al. 2020; Salimesophilobacter Zhang et al. 2013; "Ca. Savagella" Thompson et al. 2012; Serpentinicella Mei et al. 2016; Sporosalibacterium Rezgui et al. 2011; Thermobrachium ngle et al. 1996; Thermohalobacter Cayol et al. 2000; Thermotalea Ogg & Patel 2009; Tindallia Kevbrin et al. 1999; "Ca. Ventrousia" Gilroy et al. 2021; Wukongibacter Li et al. 2016; Youngiibacter Lawson et al. 2014	"Lutisporales"; "Lutisporaceae"; Lutispora; Clostridiales; "Oxobacteraceae"; Oxobacter; Clostridiaceae; Anaeromonas; Clostridium; "Desnuesiella"; Haloimpatiens; Hathewaya; Oceanirhabdus; Proteiniclasticum; "Ca. Savagella"; Youngiibacter; "Caloramatoraceae"; Caloramator; Fervidicella; Fonticella; Thermobrachium; Tissierellales; "Clostridiisalibacteraceae"; Clostridiisalibacter; VENL01; Sporosalibacterium; "Caldisalinibacteraceae"; Caldisalinibacter; Thermohalobacteraceae; Brassicibacter; Caloranaerobacter; Thermohalobacter; "Peptostreptococcales"; "Caminicellaceae"; Caminicella; Maledivibacter; "Ca. Petromonas"; Paramaledivibacter; Wukongibacter; "Acidaminobacteraceae"; Acidaminobacter; Fusibacter; "Thermotaleaceae"; Anaeromicrobium; "Anaerophilus"; Anaerosolibacter; Crassaminicella; Geosporobacter; "Inediibacterium"; Marinisporobacter; Salimesophilobacter; Thermotalea; "Tindalliaceae"; Anoxynatronum; Tindallia; "Natronincolaceae"; Alkaliphilus; Anaerovirgula; Natronincola; Serpentinicella; "Oscillospirales"; "Butyricicoccaceae"; Agathobaculum; Butyricicoccus; "Intestinibacillus"; "Ca. Pseudobutyricicoccus"; "Ca. Ventrousia"

== Phylogeny ==
The currently accepted taxonomy is based on the List of Prokaryotic names with Standing in Nomenclature (LPSN) and National Center for Biotechnology Information (NCBI)

16S rRNA based LTP_10_2024

- Clostridiaceae
  - Oxobacter
  - - - Fervidicella
      - - Fonticella
        - - Clostridium cylindrosporum
          - - Caloramator species-group 2
            - - Caloramator
              - Thermobrachium
    - - Clostridium ~2
      - - Clostridium ~3
        - - Clostridium ~4
          - - - Clostridium cadaveris (Klein 1899) McClung & McCoy 1957
              - - Youngiibacter
                - Proteiniclasticum
            - - Clostridium ~5
              - - Clostridium ~6
                - - - Inconstantimicrobium
                    - Clostridium ~7
                  - - - Clostridium perfringens (Veillon & Zuber 1898) Holland 1920 ex Hauduroy et al. 1937
                      - - Clostridium tarantellae (Udey, Young & Sallman 1977) Lawson & Rainey 2016
                        - Sarcina Goodsir 1842
                    - Clostridium Trécul 1865 ex Prazmowski 1880

120 marker proteins based GTDB 09-RS220

- - - Oxobacteraceae
      Oxobacter Collins et al. 1994
  - - Caloramatoraceae
      - Clostridium cylindrosporum Barker & Beck 1942 ex Andreesen, Zindel & Durre 1985
      - - - Fervidicella Ogg & Patel 2010
          - Fonticella Fraj et al. 2013
        - - Caloramator species-group 2
          - - Thermobrachium Engle et al. 1996
            - Caloramator Collins et al. 1994
    - Clostridiaceae
      - "Ca. Dwaynesavagella" corrig. Gilroy et al. 2021
      - - - Youngiibacter Lawson et al. 2014
          - Proteiniclasticum Zhang, Song & Dong 2010
        - - - Clostridium AE & AU
            - - Clostridium K & AN
              - - Clostridium AT
                - - - Clostridium I & S
                    - Clostridium B, C, F, G, AK, AM, AO, AS, AV & AW
                  - - - Haloimpatiens Wu et al. 2016
                      - Clostridium H & AF
                    - - - - Clostridium tepidiprofundi Slobodkina et al. 2008
                          - Oceanirhabdus Pi et al. 2013
                        - - Clostridium collagenovorans Jain & Zeikus 1988
                          - Hathewaya Lawson & Rainey 2016
                      - Clostridium J & AD
          - - - Clostridium X & Z
              - - "Desnuesiella" Hadjadj et al. 2016
                - Clostridium L
            - - Clostridium AA
              - - - Inconstantimicrobium Wylensek et al. 2021
                  - - - "Vallorillus" Heller 1922
                      - Anaerobacter Duda et al. 1996
                    - - Clostridium cavendishii Bowman et al. 2010
                      - Sarcina Goodsir 1842
                - Clostridium Trécul 1865 ex Prazmowski 1880

== See also ==
- List of bacteria genera
- List of bacterial orders
