= Alexandre Liautard =

French veterinarian

Alexandre François Augustin Liautard
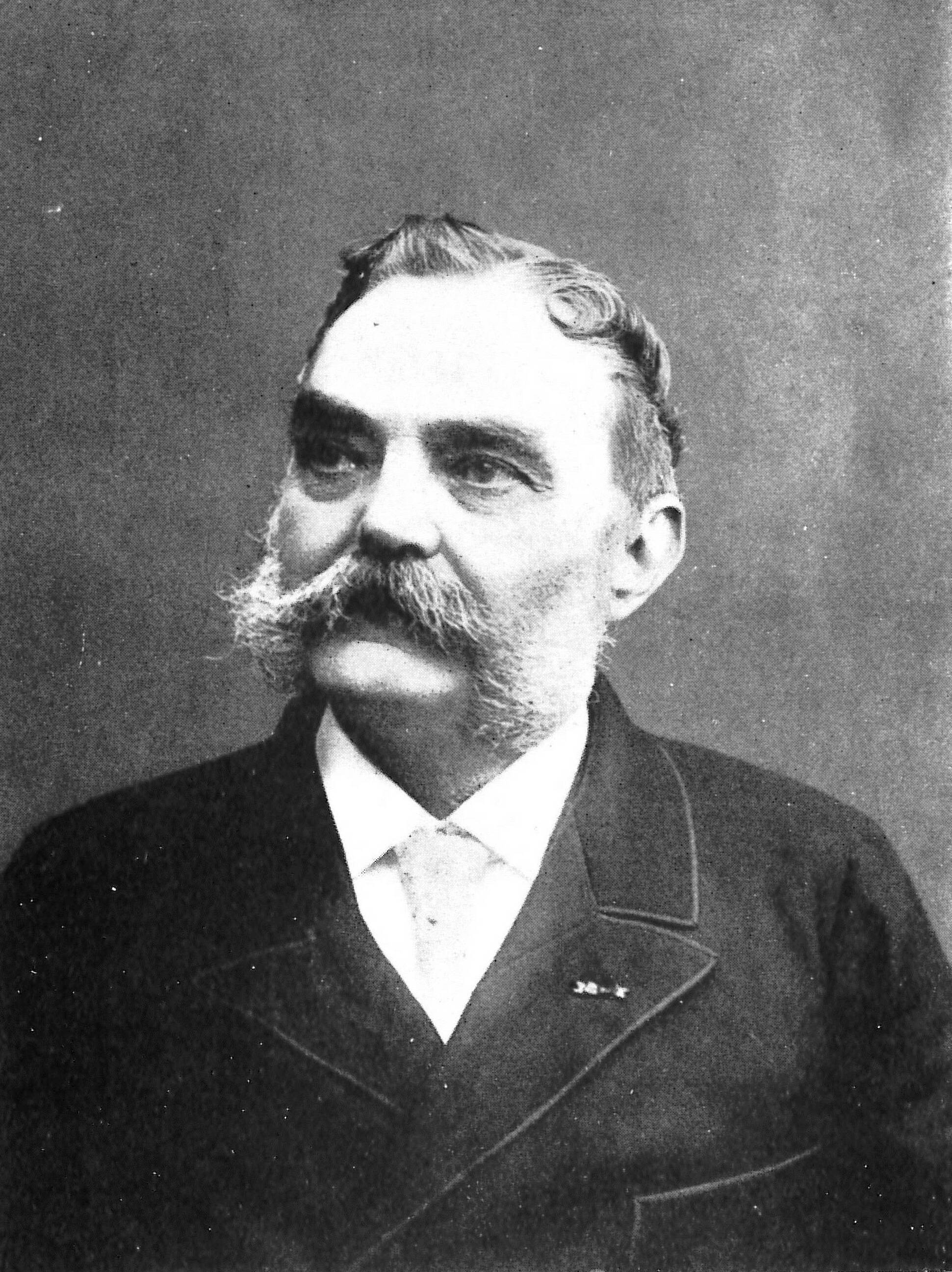
- Liautard in about 1901
- Born: February 15, 1835; Paris
- Died: April 20, 1918 (aged 83); New York City, New York
- Education: École nationale vétérinaire d'Alfort, École nationale vétérinaire de Toulouse
- Known for: Founder of a Veterinary School in New York and the Journal of the American Veterinary Medical Association, known as the "father of the American veterinary profession".
- Awards: Chevalier de la Legion d'honneur
- Scientific career
- Fields: Veterinarian, equine medicine and surgery, veterinary teaching in the United States
- Workplaces: New York American Veterinary College, American Veterinary Medical Association

Signature
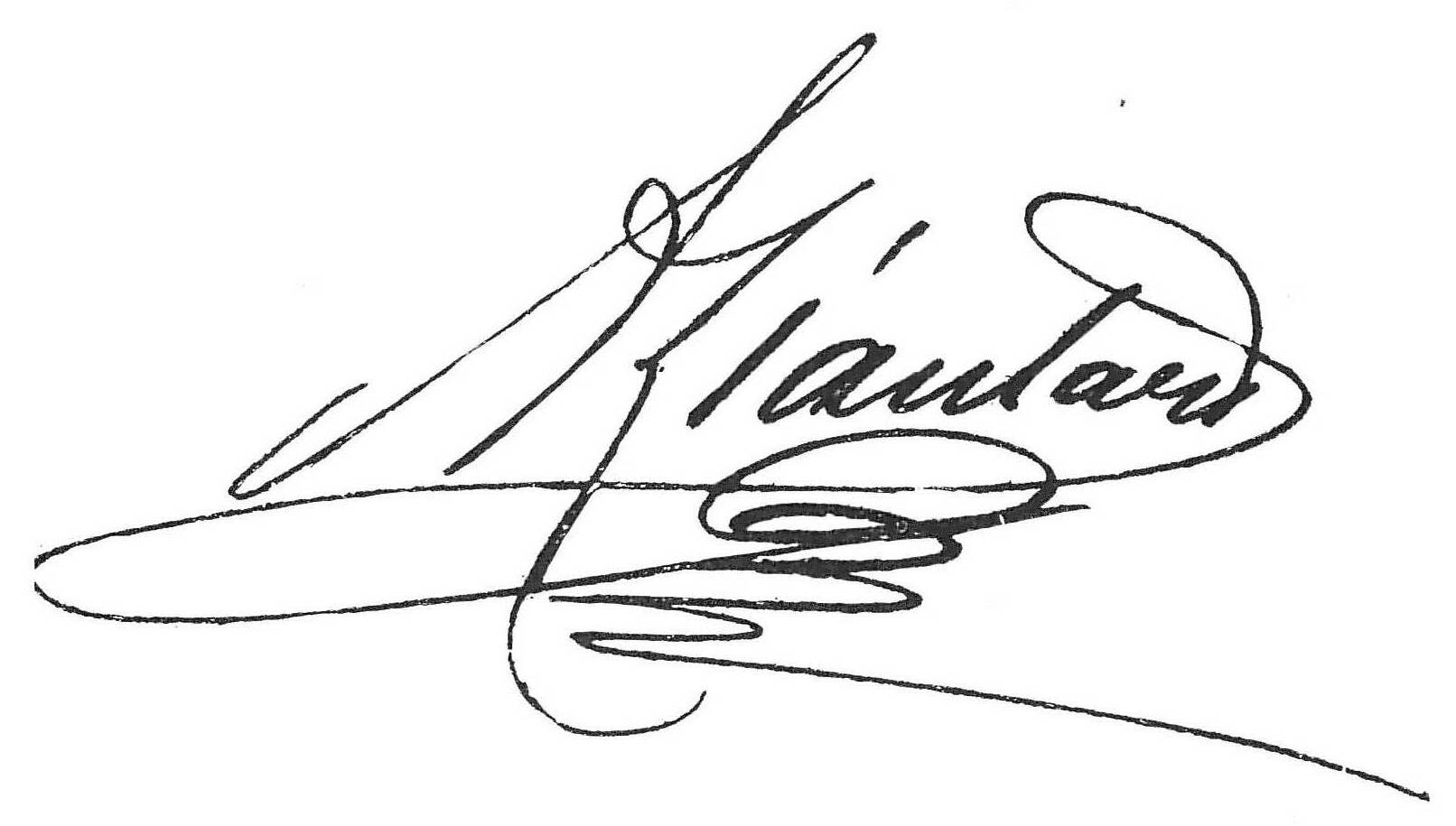

Alexandre François Augustin Liautard (February 15, 1835, Paris – April 20, 1918, Bois-Jérôme-Saint-Ouen, Eure, France) was a French veterinarian. After graduating from the École nationale vétérinaire de Toulouse in 1856, he emigrated to the United States in 1859 to exercise his profession of veterinary practitioner in New York until 1900, when he retired and returned to France. The name of Alexandre Liautard is associated with the beginning of private veterinary education in America. Liautard was the founder and dean of the New York American Veterinary College. He participated in organizing the American Veterinary profession and founded the United States Veterinary Medical Association, now the American Veterinary Medical Association, of which he was for many years a driving force. His name is still cited in the American veterinary press as a dominant figure in the history of the profession for having defined its professional standards and missions, and been a uniting force, and as founder of the American Veterinary Review, now the Journal of the American Veterinary Medical Association (JAVMA).

Alexandre Liautard is honored today, as he was during his lifetime, as the "father of the American veterinary profession".

== Biography ==
Alexandre François Augustin Liautard was born on 15 February 1835 at 33 rue Neuve-Saint- Augustin, now rue Saint-Augustin, in the 2nd arrondissement of Paris. He was the son of Jean-François Liautard, a locksmith contractor, and Charlotte Gabrielle Héloïse Vives, born in Paris, and who died in 1841 when Alexandre Liautard was only five years old. He had two sisters. His maternal uncle Étienne Gabriel Vives was a veterinarian in the military profession.

=== Veterinary studies ===
In 1851, Alexandre Liautard was accepted as pupil at the École nationale vétérinaire d'Alfort. In 1855, his father died and, five days later, Alexandre was expelled from Alfort « for a very serious breach of discipline » the subject of which is unknown. In addition, he had been unable to take the exams at the end of the first semester, due to illness. After halting his studies for several months he was admitted to the École nationale vétérinaire de Toulouse where he finished his fourth year and obtained his diploma in 1856.

==== Veterinary practitioner in New-York ====
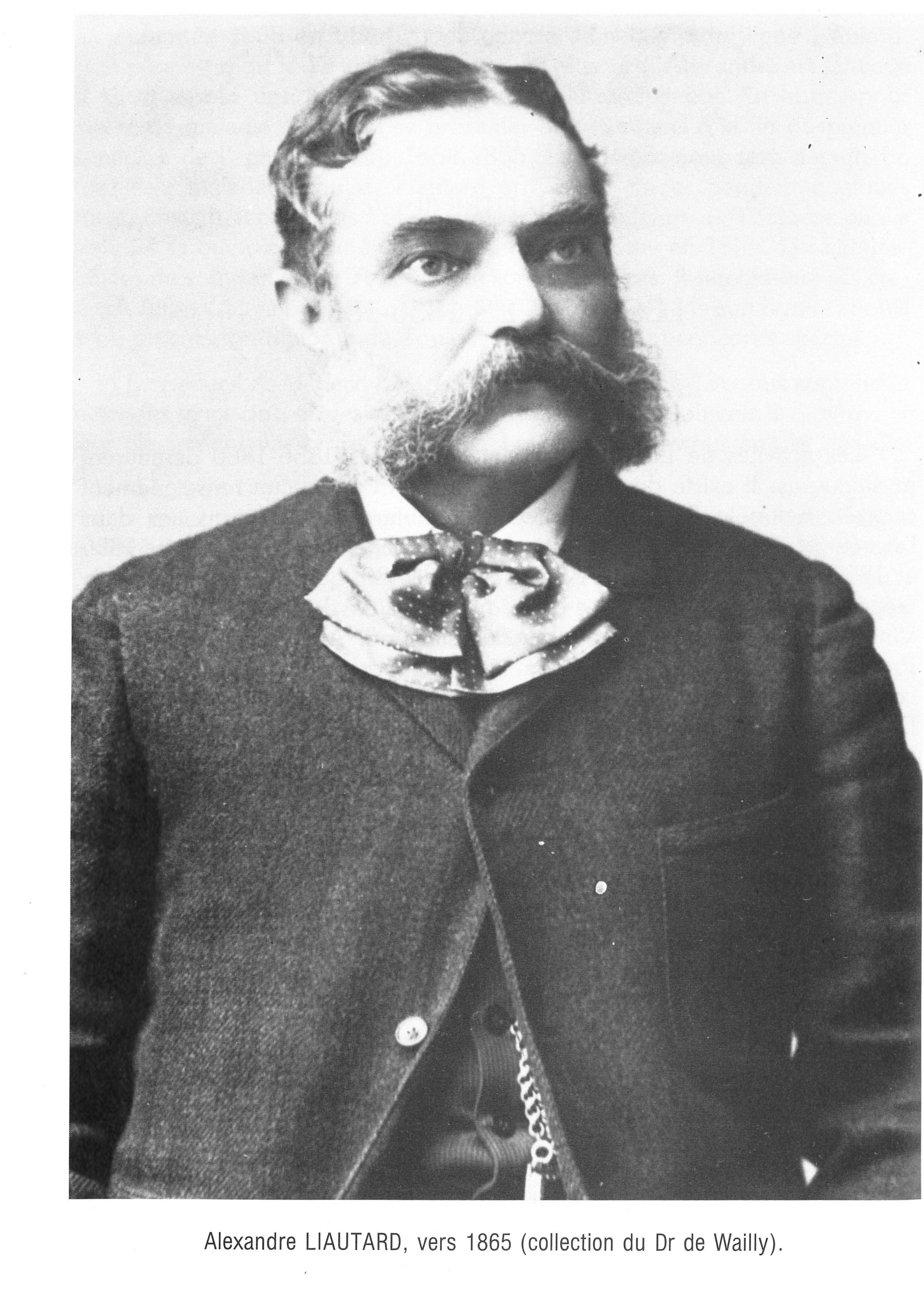
Alexandre Liautard in 1865

His activities between 1856 and 1859 remain unknown. His award certificate for the Legion of Honor mentions three years of military service, and although this was initially quoted by Lester Crawford an investigation carried out at the Service historique de l'armée de terre (Army history department) in France did not find any mention of his name. In addition, the military service period was six years at that time, and in accordance with the Gouvion-Saint-Cyr law, admission was by recruitment or by random draw. It is therefore most likely that Liautard drew a "good number" and was not recruited.

He arrived at New York in 1859 where he settled and quickly opened a veterinary clinic. The city was in full expansion at that time, despite the Civil War which began in 1861. Developments were not only economic but also occurring at the university level. Fifteen universities were created during this wartime period, including Cornell, Swarthmore College, and MIT. Minds were also open to the creation of professional colleges.

At the beginning of Liautard's career in New York, very few American veterinarians possessed diplomas and all those who did had received veterinary training in Europe. Many "horse doctors" were simply farriers. It was in this context that Liautard was able to establish himself in New York, despite the inevitable difficulties of acclimatizing to a new culture and working in a language foreign to him. He settled in the centre of New York City, at 215, Lexington Avenue. At the same time, he acquired the diploma of medical doctor (doctor in medicine) at the University Medical College, now the New York University School of Medicine. The intense activity that he deployed as a practitioner during his forty years of professional life in the United States enabled him to become very affluent, even wealthy, judging by his real estate acquisitions on his return to France in 1900. Above all, it provided him with the means to finance his undertakings in veterinary education and publishing in the United States.

To emphasize the extent of the market open to the veterinary profession, Liautard periodically published, in the American Veterinary Review, statistics on American livestock and meat exports which he compared with those of the main European countries and their imports. Horses were extremely important in towns at that time, due to the use of horse-drawn vehicles.

===== Importance of the equine population in the United States =====
The end of the 19th century marked the heyday of the horse. Long considered as the century of steam and railways, the 19th century was above all an equine century. Rail transport and horse-drawn transport were complementary. During the Gilded Age the equine population in the United States rose from 7 million in 1860 to 25 million in 1900. Although town horses only represented 11 to 12% of this population, their importance in urban development was considerably greater. In 1900, the average density was 426 horses per square mile in the 46 largest cities of the United States, and 500 in New York City and Chicago. In 1900, 130,000 horses lived and worked in Manhattan, 74,000 in Chicago, and 51,000 in Philadelphia. In 1879, The New York Times wrote: "New York must move on wheels, the whole population must drive... This is obviously a stable city".

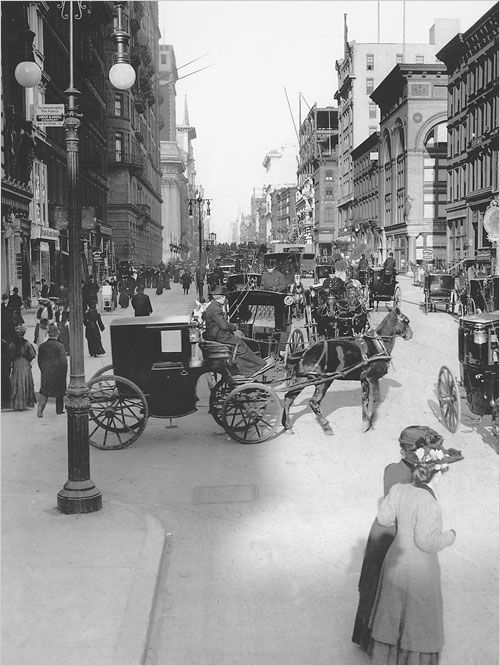

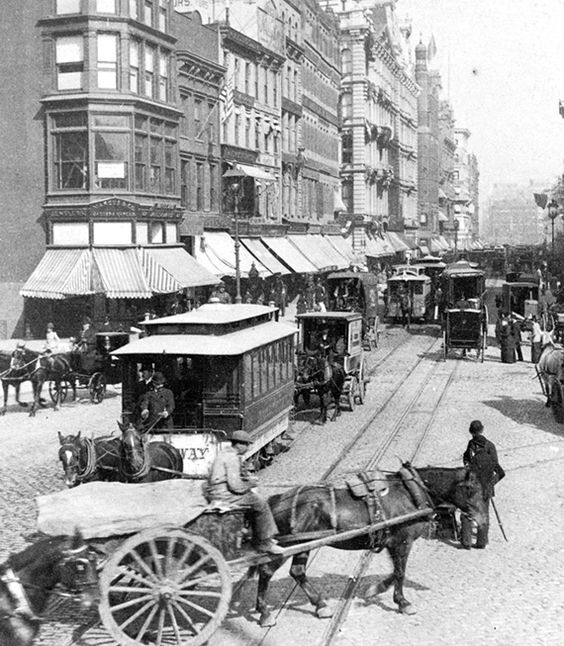

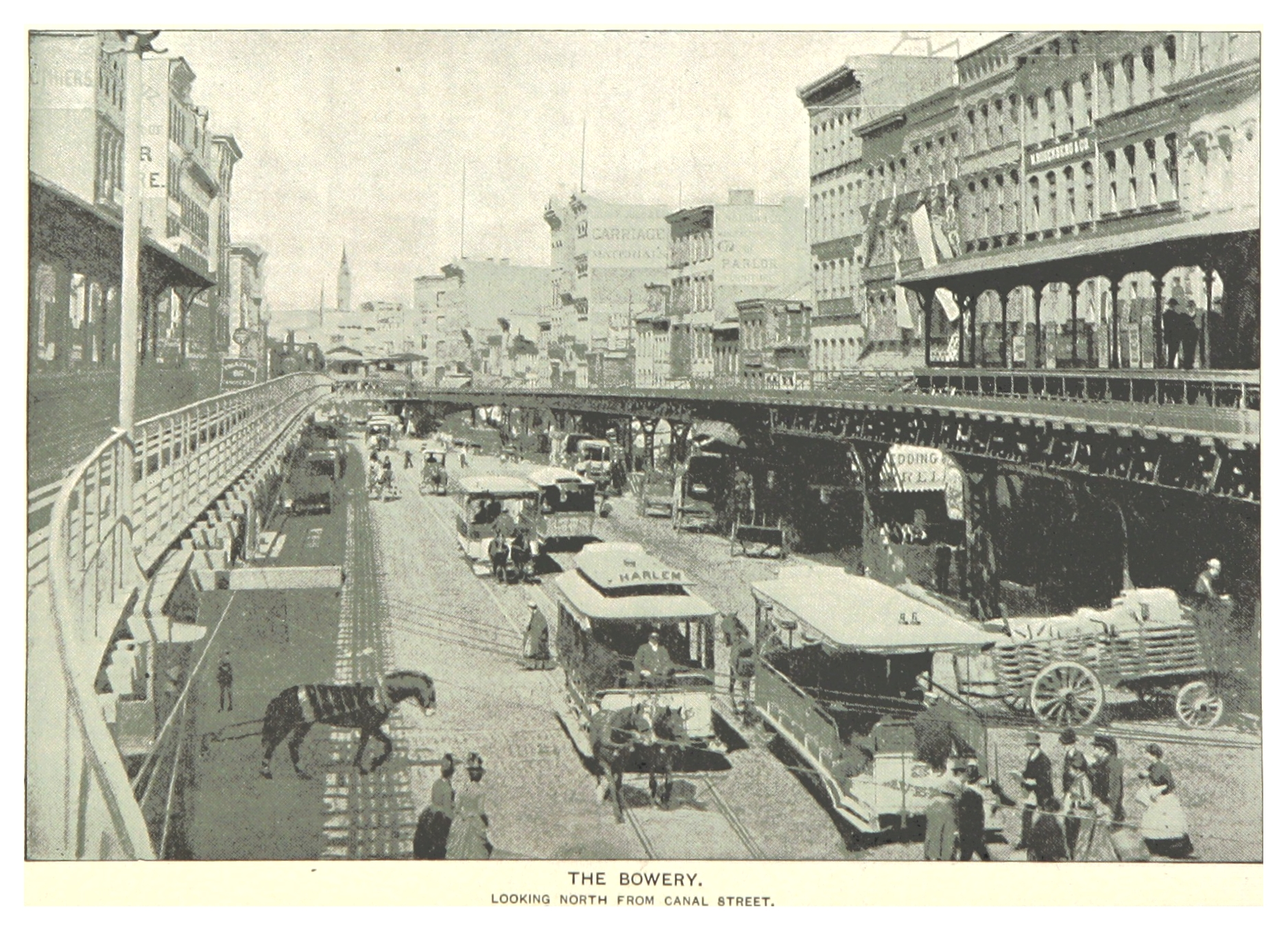

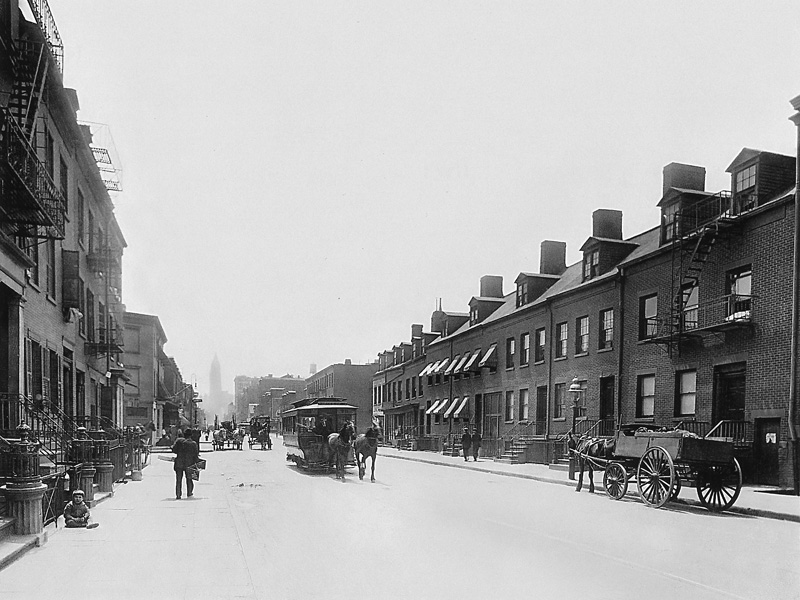

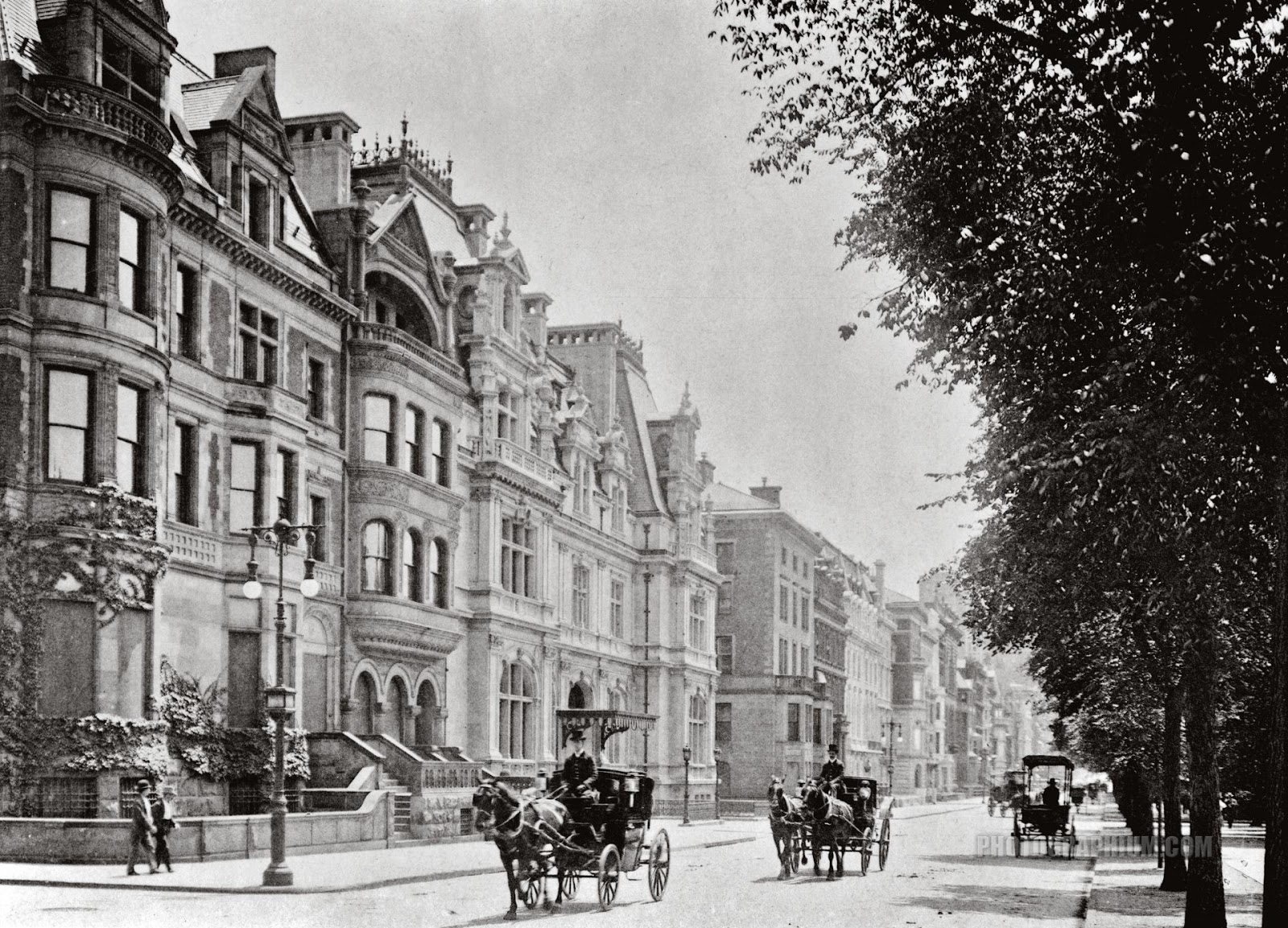
Horse-drawn vehicles in the streets of New York, 1880–1900

=== Family life and return to France ===
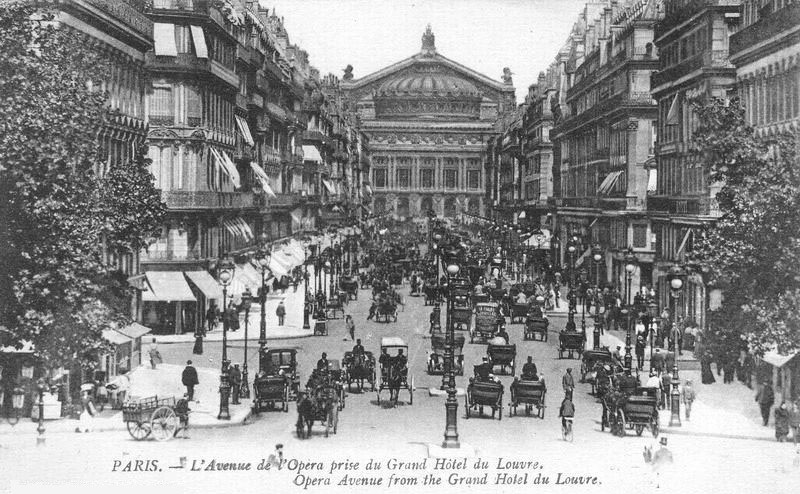
Avenue de l'Opéra, Paris, 1900

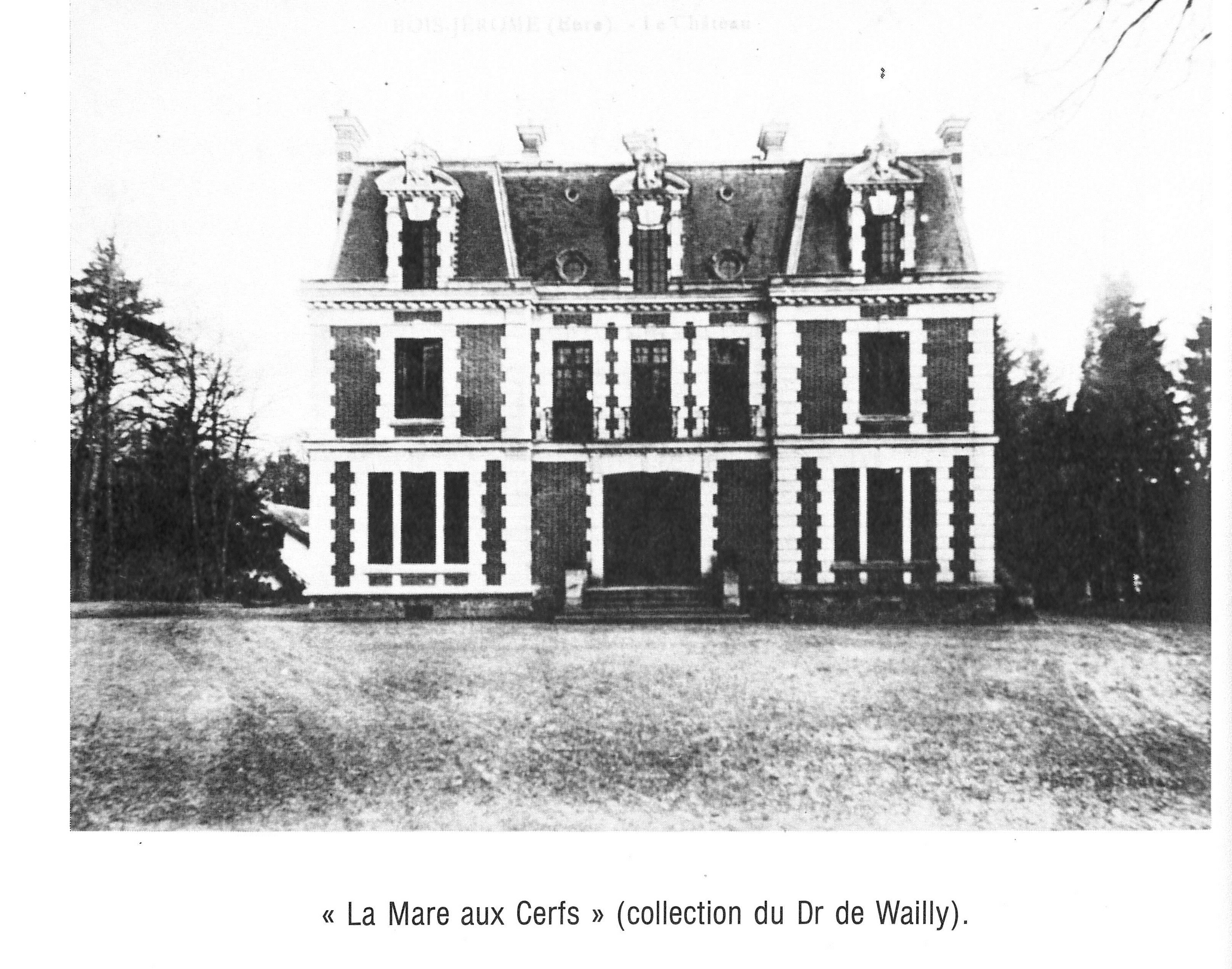
Mare aux Cerfs chateau at Bois-Jérôme-Saint-Ouen, in the Eure. Taken from the Am. Vet. Rev. (oct. 1914) : Summer home of Professor Liautard

In New York, Alexandre Lieutard married Emily Joséphine Stouvenel the daughter of French immigrants to New-York. Their only daughter, Marie-Louise was born in 1864 in New York where she was brought up. In 1890, she married Octave Boyer who had come to New York to set up a branch of the Grande Maison de Blanc, a luxury Brussels store in Opéra district of Paris. The New York store on Fifth avenue was closed down in the 1960s. In 1900, when Octave Boyer was made director of the Grande Maison de Blanc, boulevard des Capucines, in Paris, Alexandre Liautard retired and returned to France with his wife, then reliant on a wheelchair due to cerebral infarction, and with his daughter and son-in-law. It seems that Liautard was too attached to his daughter to let her leave without him. They lived in a vast apartment on the fourth floor of a luxury building at 14, avenue de l'Opéra.

Although no longer a practitioner, Liautard continued to develop numerous activities. As honorary dean of New York American Veterinary College, he kept up extensive correspondence from France with his American colleagues and continued to write editorials for his American Veterinary Review. He took part in the meetings of the Central Society of Veterinary Medicine which, in 1928 and thanks to Emmanuel Leclainche, became the Veterinary Academy of France (Académie vétérinaire de France). He became its president in 1911. From 1914 onwards, he provided financial support for the activities of the Commission for Relief in Belgium initiated by Herbert Hoover (who would later become President of the United States), to provide aid to German-occupied Belgium. In 1911, he purchased a small 19th-century chateau, La Mare aux Cerfs, at Bois-Jérôme-Saint-Ouen, near to Vernon, in the Eure. It was there that he died on April 18, 1918, following a heart attack.

== Work and achievements ==
Although Alexandre Liautard remains little known in France, he is famous and recognized by the veterinary world of the United States as a dominant figure in the history of the American veterinary profession. On the occasion of the 150th anniversary of the American Veterinary Medical Association (AVMA), in 2013, an article in the association's journal, the JAVMA, dated January 1, 2013, described him as one of the 12 most famous figures in the history of the American veterinary profession and, during that year, devoted the first of the twelve biographies of founders published by the journal, to him:

Dr Alexandre Francois Liautard, the father of the American veterinary profession, almost single-handedly transformed the uneducated, disorganized veterinarians of the United States into a learned profession. He founded two veterinary schools that served as the blueprints for veterinary education as it exists today. He also helped establish the AVMA and was the first editor of its Journal.

=== "Entrepreneur" of veterinary education, founder and dean of the veterinary school ===
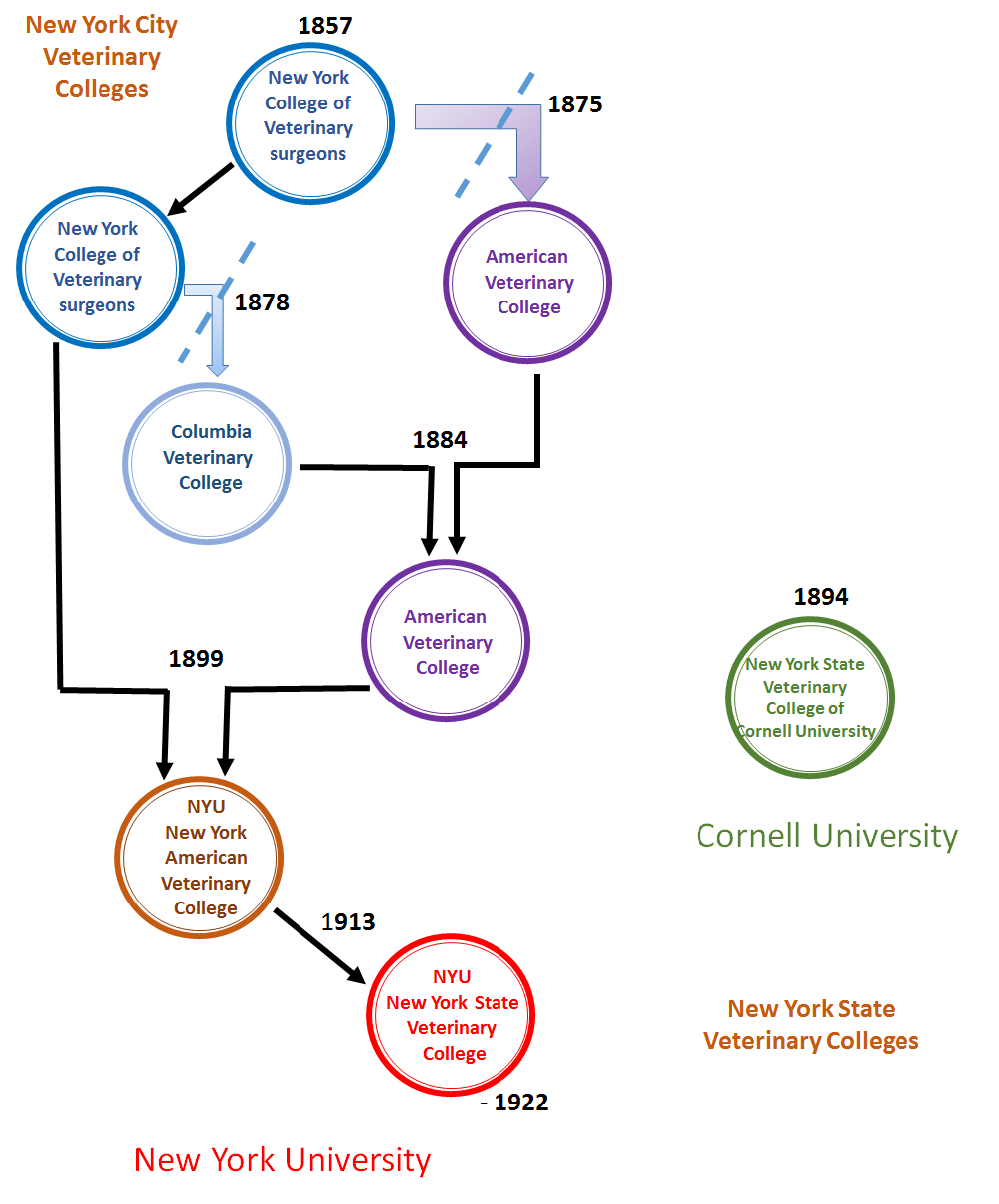
Graphic Outline of past New York City's five Veterinary Colleges (1857–1921) and of New York State Veterinary College of Cornell University (1894–), from Donald F. Smith, modified

In the United States (as in Great Britain but unlike France), the first veterinary schools were private enterprises. Like the universities to which they are attached, many still are today. The first American Veterinary colleges, recognized legally as such, were created between 1850 and 1860 at Philadelphia, Boston and New York City. Today, the Iowa State University College of Veterinary Medicine, founded in 1879, the University of Pennsylvania School of Veterinary Medicine (PennVet) founded in 1884, the Ohio State University College of Veterinary Medicine founded in 1885, and the Cornell University College of Veterinary Medicine, founded in 1894, are the four oldest American veterinary establishments still functioning. For the record, the French veterinary schools of Lyon and Alfort were founded in 1761 and 1765, respectively, the École nationale vétérinaire de Toulouse was created in 1825 and inaugurated in 1835 and the Royal Veterinary College of London in 1791. The first principal of this latter was a French veterinarian, Charles Vial de Saint Bel, who trained at the Veterinary School of Lyon.

==== The New York College of Veterinary Surgeons ====
The first three American veterinary colleges at Philadelphia, Boston and New York were not successful and did not last long. The New York College of Veterinary Surgeons, founded in 1857 by Dr John Busteed (1815–1876), a doctor of Irish origin, is considered as the veritable precursor of veterinary teaching in the United States, but the establishment had to close down in 1859, due to lack of pupils. Dr Busteed did not abandon his project and reorganized his school in 1862. Liautard had been in New York since 1860 and had already set up premises at 205 Lexington Avenue. His notoriety must have already been well-established and his position sufficiently secure for him to be able to house this college in his own building, by private arrangement, where it opened in 1864. He was a member of the teaching staff and continued his activity as practitioner on the premises, which remained his property. Doctors formed part of the teaching staff. In 1870, Busteed retired and Liautard succeeded him as president of the teaching body. The establishment was directed by a board of trustees. In 1875, dissension arose within the board of trustees. All the teaching staff resigned and followed Liautard who founded his own school: the American Veterinary College.

The New York College of Veterinary Surgeons continued to function as best it could and finished by merging in 1899 with the American Veterinary College directed by Liautard. He trained a total of 292 graduate veterinary surgeons. In the meantime, some teachers left to create the Columbia Veterinary College which lasted from 1878 to 1884 and trained a total of 82 graduates.

==== The American Veterinary College ====
In April 1875, two months after the closure of the New York College of Veterinary Surgeons, the American Veterinary College opened as a private establishment under the direction of Liautard, in a new building that he had purchased at 141 West 54th Street. Both the college and veterinary clinic were owned by Liautard who taught and had a practice there until his retirement and return to France in 1900. The college rapidly became very famous, mainly due to the personal genius of Liautard on all fronts, not only as a teacher and reputed clinician, but also as manager and remarkable organizer of a professional network of former pupils he had trained, and with whom he corresponded and supported through his journal, the American Veterinary Review. In April 1887, Liautard wrote:

Twenty years ago, an American veterinary profession did not exist; today, its national successful representatives are, in the main, alumni of the American Veterinary College. The evidence of the work accomplished by the college in the past twenty years is shown by the fact that out of than not more 600 veterinary surgeons qualified to practice, and holding diplomas as such, who are today practicing veterinary medicine in the United States, the American Veterinary college has contributed 236 or more than one-third. As to the efficiency of the American Veterinary College, it may be stated that out of 236 alumni, fifty of them have been or are now occupying Government or State positions or filling professorships in agricultural or veterinary institutions.

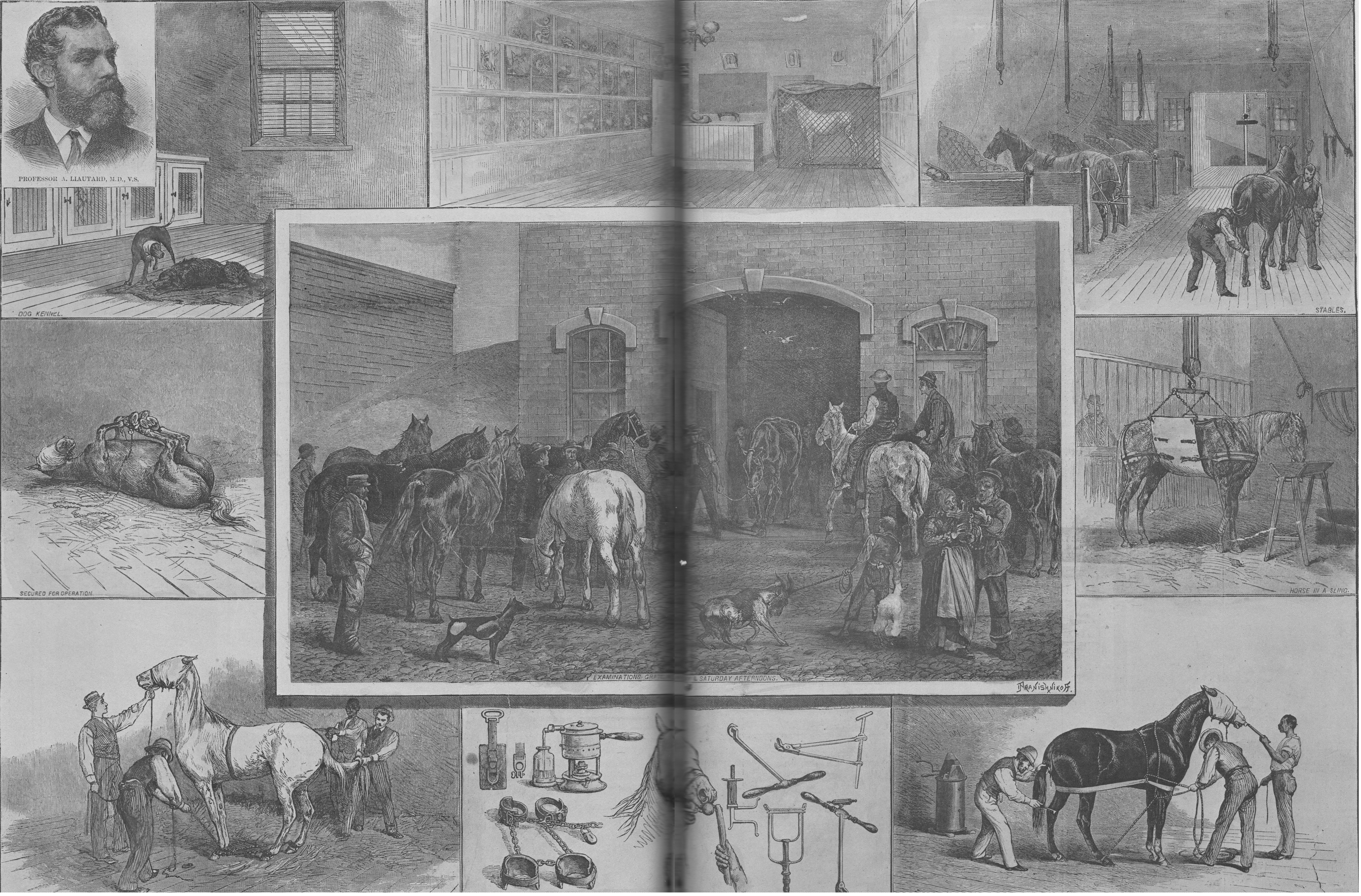
Engraving depicting Professor Alexandre Liautard's equine clinic, see top left, around 1880, Harper's Weekly

The clinical activities of the Hospital Department of the American Veterinary College were published annually; in 1887 he summarized the 12 previous years as follows :

The Hospital Department of the College has within the past 12 years treated 26,800 sick animals, horses or dogs, and over 8,800 operations have been performed. Free clinics have been held since 1875 to afford the poor, who cannot remunerate the services of a veterinary surgeon, an opportunity to obtain relief for their suffering animals. At these clinics, held twice a week throughout the year, there have been treated during the past twelve years over 5000 sick animals, upon whom over 1300 operations have been performed. In the Hospital, patients are admitted for care and treatment during their illness, thereby affording the best opportunities for the instruction of the students of the College. During the past twelve years over 5500 horses and 600 dogs have been inmates of the hospital.

It is remarkable that, throughout this entire period, all these results were obtained by self-financing with hardly any external support. Nevertheless, Liautard's ambitions to develop his school would require such support, if not as aid from the public authorities, at least as private contributions, in accordance with the American culture favoring private initiative, and it was to these that he appealed in 1887. He relied on the results of the American Veterinary College and on a favorable editorial published by the New York Herald, then the most widely-read newspaper in the United States, from which Liautard reproduced the following extracts in the American Veterinary Reviewː

New York, the birthplace of veterinary medicine, veterinary societies and veterinary journalism in the United States, has a school which has sent forth hundreds of able practitioners, and made an enviable name for itself without any assistance from the public, the success of the American Veterinary College has stimulated educational work of a similar kind in other parts of the Union. A veterinary school was started in Philadelphia three or four years ago, and it has made rapid progress, because the people have been generous towards it.

Between 1875 and 1899, the American Veterinary College trained 629 graduates.

==== Liautard and the creation of new veterinary colleges ====
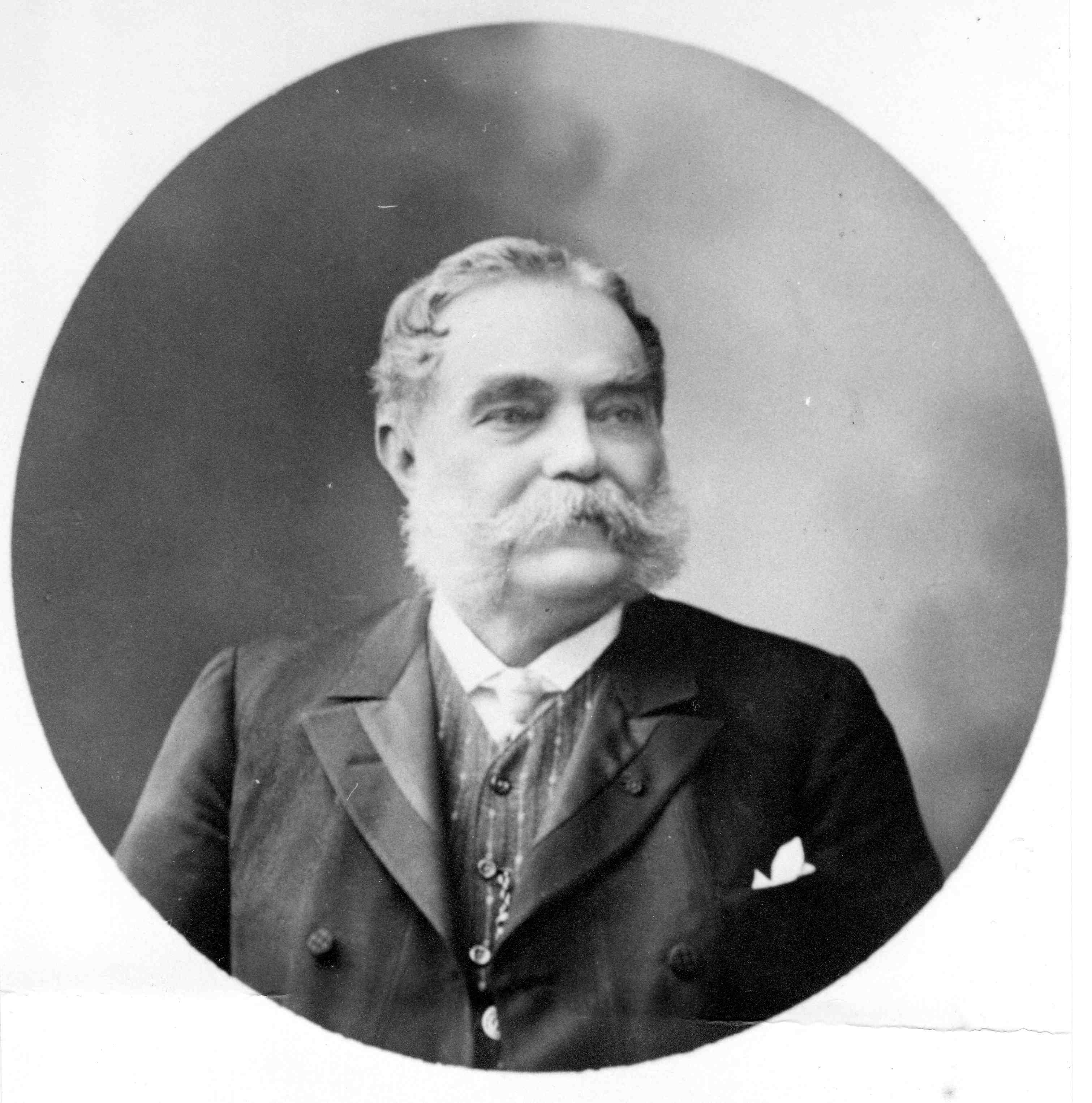
Alexandre Liautard

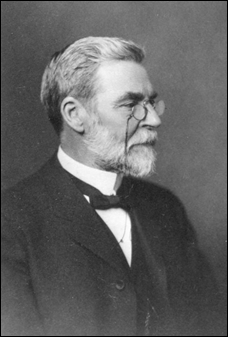
James Law

More than his own professional success, which was certainly fundamental but above all provided the means to satisfy his ambitions, Liautard's grand project was to create or encourage the emergence of an organized American veterinary profession, recognized professionally and scientifically like the medical profession. He considered the Union territory sufficiently vast for other initiatives like his to be developed in other States (Note: In 1939, The Veterinary Student identified 49 teaching veterinary establishments set up in the United States between 1857 and 1918, of which only 11 were still functioning in 1939) and encouraged all of them provided that the professional standard, which he never ceased to promote, was respected.

His relationship with James Law, another great name in the history of American veterinary medicine, is highly instructive in this respect. James Law, a veterinarian of Scottish origin, was recruited by Ezra Cornell to provide veterinary teaching in the specialized University of Agronomy that he had founded at Ithaca, now Cornell University, in New York State. In 1894, James Law was responsible for creating the college of veterinary medicine within this private university, even though the American Veterinary College existed in the same State, in New York City, in Manhattan. Liautard opened the columns of his Journal to Law and supported his teaching and university projects, provided that they ultimately resulted in a college of veterinary medicine which applied the same statutes and professional standards to train veterinarians as those laid down for the American Veterinary College, and that in no case would it be a question of training empirics ː

No, agricultural students cannot receive in an agricultural school the education that good veterinarians ought to have, and good as the efforts of the teachers may have been, the result cannot but be the same, viz.: the turning out of so many men scarcely better than empirics.

To which Law vigorously defended himself in the American Veterinary Review, explaining his vision and project which already corresponded to the demands of Research-linked higher education and received support for this from the public authorities. Many former pupils of Liautard taught at the Cornell University College of Veterinary Medicine and in veterinary colleges in other States of the Union. James Law was the first veterinary professor of an American university and greatly improved the scientific standard of veterinary training.

===== « Triumph and Tragedy : The Story of Law and Liautard » =====
« Triumph and Tragedy : The Story of Law and Liautard » : It is in these terms that Donald Smith, who was dean of Cornell Veterinary College from 1997 to 2007, described the relationship between Liautard and Law, a triumph for Law who saw the fruition of his life's work, in the creation of Cornell Veterinary College, which was ranked first of the 30 veterinary schools in the United States, and therefore first in the world, right from the beginning until just a few years ago, before being dethroned by that of Davis, in California. And yet a tragedy, in the opinion of dean Smith, who considered Liautard's strategic vision to have a major veterinary school in the university world of New York City, rather than in the countryside of Ithaca, was the better one. (Note: Dean Smith expressed it in these terms : While Law was working in upstate New York in the small town of Ithaca, Alexandre Liautard (who was also an MD) was equally influential but in a different way. Liautard's New York City veterinary practice was chosen as the site for the New York College of Veterinary Surgeons which began clinical instruction in 1864. Like his academic colleague, Liautard was a credible scientist and rigorous educator, though the three New York City colleges that he led at different times in his career were not part of comprehensive universities. Nor did Liautard have the diplomatic skills of Law, for he seemed always to be at the center of one conflict or another. When his acerbic tongue was not criticizing his peers across the country and in Canada for low academic standards, he was writing scathing editorials in the American Veterinary Journal which he had established. In one of his most memorable achievements, Liautard served as catalyst for the organization of a group of east coast veterinarians in the Astor House in New York City in the summer of 1863. From this humble beginning of the United States Veterinary Medical Association, the AVMA was formed 35 years later. More than any other 19th century veterinarians, Law and Liautard lay the groundwork for veterinary medicine as we know it today. One can only wonder how the profession would have developed if James Law had acceded to Liautard's urging that he leave rural Ithaca and move his state-supported college to New York City, where he could have developed strengths in the beginning field of pet medicine and expand the academic and clinical relationships in the medical and comparative medical communities. As it was, the last of the New York City veterinary colleges that Liautard spent much of his professional life leading and nurturing closed in 1922. Like the other major academic and medical cities of Boston, Chicago, Washington, and Toronto, where veterinary medicine had been prominent for decades, the most populous city of America has not had an academic veterinary presence since. This was one of the most defining events in our profession's history and a tragedy of incalculable proportions for both animal and human medicine.).

===== Integration of the Veterinary Colleges into the university system =====
In 1899, the American Veterinary College merged with the New York College of Veterinary Surgeons to form the New York American Veterinary College, of which Liautard was dean. At the same time the college became part of the University of New York, (a private university), thereby satisfying Liautard's expectations who considered the insertion of veterinary training into the American university system, like all American establishments of higher education, self-evident. This attachment was a prerequisite to obtaining the hoped-for aid, as the New York State Veterinary College, from the State of New York, just like the veterinary College of Cornell set up in 1894 within Cornell University, (a private university). According to T.F. Jones, New York University historian, « the Veterinary School was, from its beginning, hampered by a meagreness of resources that was relieved only by the self-sacrifice of an enthusiastic faculty ». Accreditation of the New York American Veterinary College as the New York State Veterinary College would have made it possible to hope that the metropolitan school would receive the same financial support from the Albany Assembly as that of its rural sister college at Ithaca but Liautard retired and returned to France in 1900. This objective was attained in 1913.

The 50th anniversary of the American Veterinary Medical Association celebrated in 1913 was the occasion to remember Liautard's contribution to American veterinary medicine and to re-deliver the toasting speech made to him by Rush S. Huidekoper (Note: Rush Shippen Huidekoper (1854–1901) was a descendant of Benjamin Rush, one of the Founding Fathers of the United States, and a doctor of medicine and professor of the University of Pennsylvania. Rush S. Huidekoper, doctor of medicine, was also a veterinary graduate of the École nationale vétérinaire d'Alfort after a passage at the National Veterinary College of Lyon. In France, he was an assistant to Auguste Chauveau, Edmond Nocard and Louis Pasteur. Professor at the University of Pennsylvania, he founded in 1884 the University of Pennsylvania School of Veterinary Medicine in 1899) during the 25th anniversary of the American Veterinary College ː

The toast given to me to respond to, American Veterinary Medicine, is so closely associated with the man whom we meet to do honor to to-night, that what I can say in response to it, would be almost equally appropriate had the title been Alexander Liautard, I ask you, gentlemen, to join me in a bumper to him, scientist, practitioner, teacher, friend, a native of the country which first gave birth to veterinary schools, and stands at the head of the veterinary profession today, and an adopted son of this our great country, which has so much benefited by his sojourn amongst us, that his name will be an indelible landmark in American Veterinary Medicine.

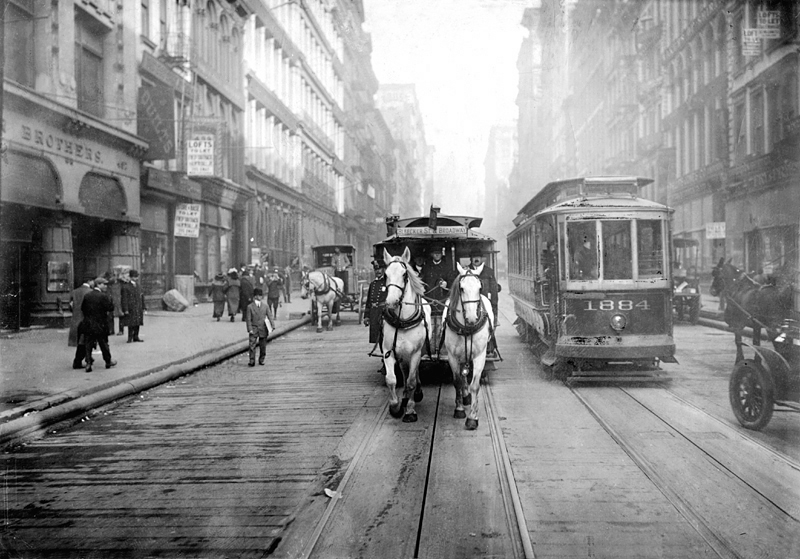
View of New York, in 1917, showing one of the last "horsecars" on the left and an "electric streetcar" on the right on Broadway near to 17th Street

==== Closure of New York University New York State Veterinary College ====
In 1923, New York University New York State Veterinary College was closed down, leaving only the New York State Veterinary College of Cornell University. The severe diminution of the horse population, due to rapid expansion of the automobile, and before being supplanted by the dog as a pet animal, together with the enormous correlated reduction in the number of veterinary candidates (between 1914 and 1924, the number of veterinary students fell by 75% throughout the Union), contributed to this closure. The decisive element, after death of the college dean, Horace Hoskins, in 1921, was the discontinuation of financial support from the New York State administration for the year 1921–1922, who concentrated their financial support on Cornell College. Thus there is no longer any veterinary college in New York City today.

The two main veterinary colleges in the United States ceased activity at the same time and for the same reasons: the Chicago Veterinary College (1883–1920) which trained 2,397 graduates, notably for the army, and the Kansas City Veterinary College (1891–1918) which trained 1,789, and also the Mc Killip Veterinary College of Chicago (1892–1920), which trained 1,212 graduates and was associated with enormous clinical activity (37,562 cases treated in 1899). These creations and closures of veterinary colleges constitute an essential trait in the history of veterinary teaching in the United States where 41 veterinary schools were closed down.

=== Organizer of the American veterinary profession: at the origin of the American Veterinary Medical Association ===
In 1863, during a local meeting of veterinarians at Philadelphia, Robert Jennings (founder of the first college of veterinary medicine at Philadelphia) proposed that a national congress should be held to improve the level of veterinary practice in the United States and for this invited veterinarians including John Busteed (founder of the New York College of Veterinary Surgeons), A.S. Copeman, A. Liautard, and Charles M. Wood. It was decided to meet in New York City on June 9, 1863. Colonel Charles A. Stetson, friend and supporter of the veterinary profession, lent them a large room in his hotel, Astor House, then the most prestigious hotel in New York. This first congress assembled 40 delegates representing 7 states : New York (state), Massachusetts, New Jersey, Pennsylvania, Maine, Ohio and Delaware.

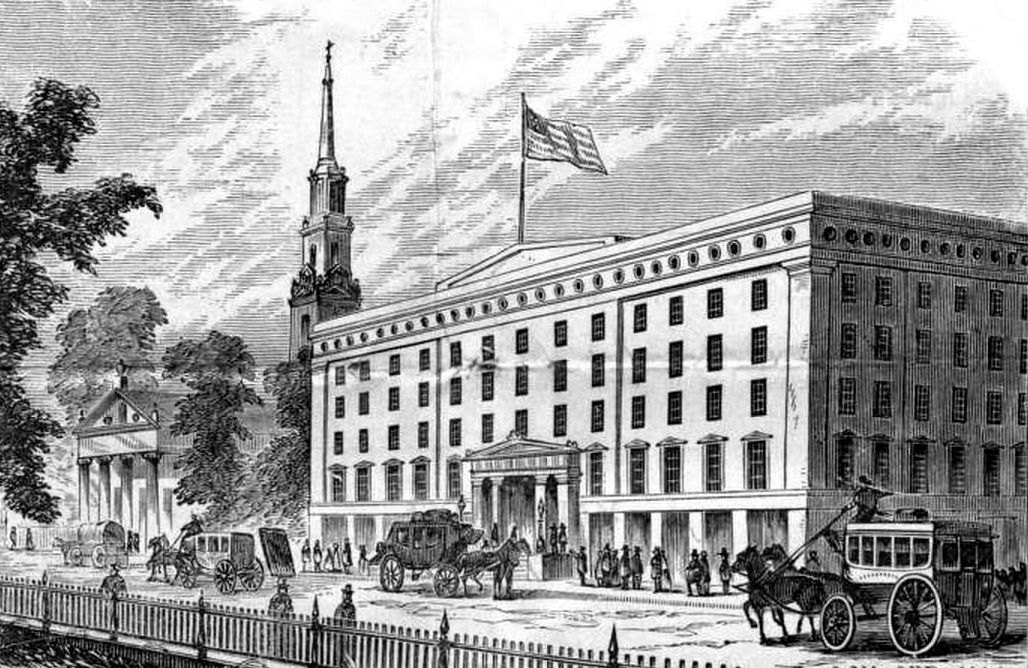
Astor House, New York, in 1862

The association, entitled the United States Veterinary Medical Association, was created on June 10, 1863. Liautard was elected secretary. Aged 28 at that time, he had been living in America for three years and was considered as one of the profession's most prominent figures. He would go on to be the president in 1874–1875, 1875–1876 and 1886–1887.

In 1907, after retiring to France in 1900, Liautard wrote in the American Veterinary Review:

« The United States Veterinary Medical Association was the first organization of this type in world. We can congratulate ourselves for having shown the entire world that even though the veterinary profession in the western hemisphere is the youngest, it nevertheless realized the advantage of having such a professional force on a national scale before it was even a dream in the eastern hemisphere ».

Each time that the occasion presented itself, and in terms of encouragement, Liautard never omitted to emphasize the strong points of American veterinary medicine as compared with European veterinary medicine, including that of France. In 1898, the United States Veterinary Medical Association became the American Veterinary Medical Association (AVMA). In 1913, during the 50th-anniversary meeting of the Association, held at New York, on September 1, 2, 3, 4 and 5, at the Hotel Astor, Dr Hoskins rendered a resounding tribute to « the father of the profession » who had had to remain in France with his wife:

« In sunny France there rests, in the evening of his life, Professor Liautard, the only living man who has had continuous membership in this association from its inception in this city in 1863 to the present hour, the one man above all others who has had deep in his heart the advancement and progress of veterinary medicine along the lines in which he established it. We are living to-day, fifty years after the birth of the association, the same code of ethics that he contributed so much to establish it fifty years ago. We have no legal entanglements of any kind, but are bound one to another by the moral uplift of our profession and for its progress and advancement by the principles of conduct which he was among the first to point up and to establish ».

During the inaugural session, the speech that Liautard had sent in was read, in which he retraced the history of the association.

Today the AVMA is a professional organization that has more than 89,000 members divided between the different professional groups, freelance veterinarians, the Administration, Teaching and Research, Industry, etc. Its headquarters are at Shaumburg in Illinois.

=== Liautard, journalist and editor ː the American Veterinary Review ===
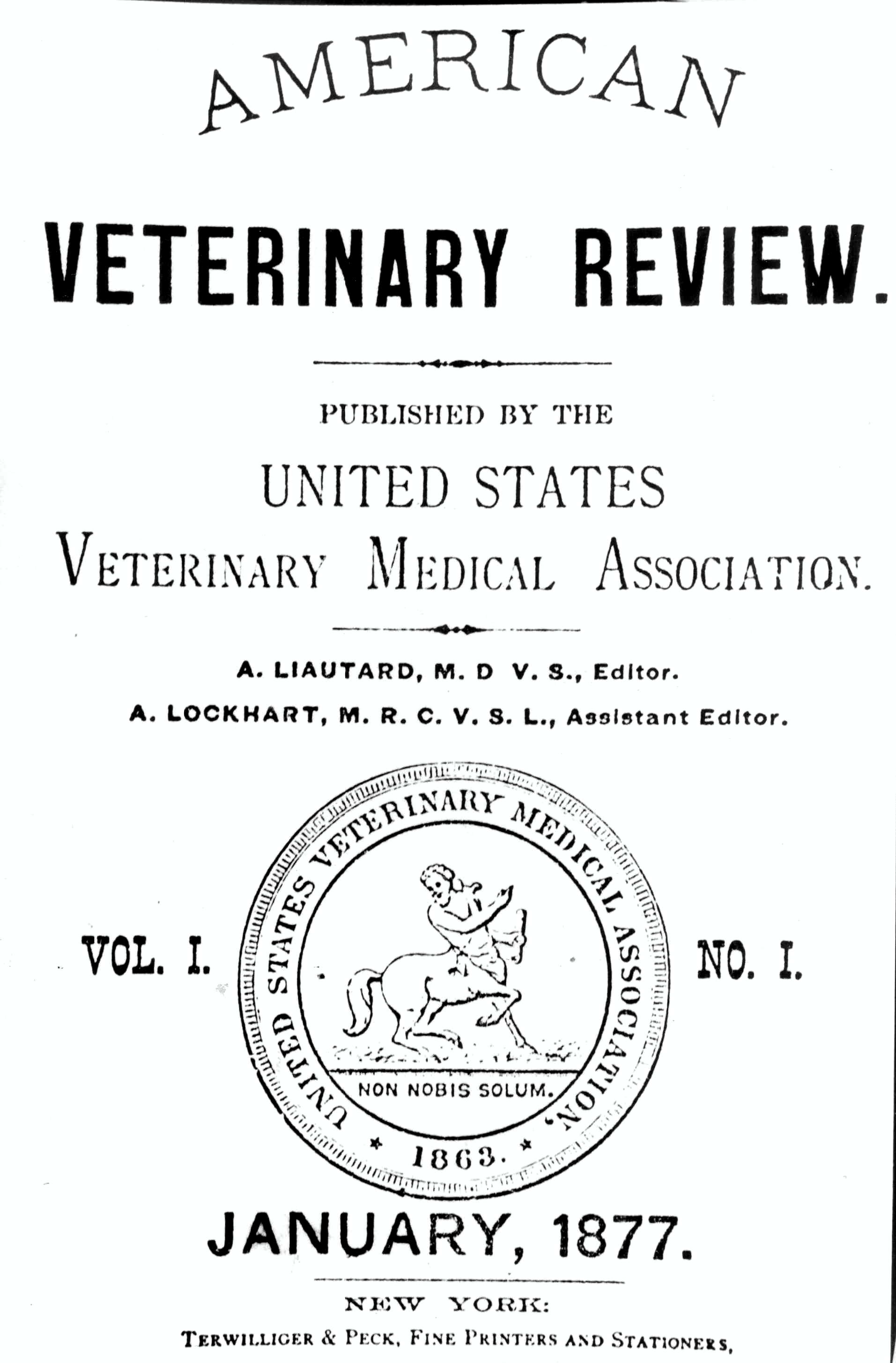
Cover page of the American Veterinary Review, vol 1, n°1, January 1877

On March 20, 1876, the USMVA, which preceded the American Veterinary Medical Association, launched the publication of the American Veterinary Review. Alexandre Liautard was made chief writer, a post that he occupied until 1900, he was also the editor. In 1881, the Association donated it to him, in recognition of the work he had accomplished for the Review and for the profession. According to J. Fred Smithcors, the American veterinary profession historian, by taking over control of the Review, he was then able to express his ideas and his professional development program « totally independently » :

Dr. Liautard successfully got the USVMA to give up the Journal so he could have full control over it, presumably because of his dissatisfaction with the restrictions placed on him by the Association regarding his management of the Journal. This move allowed him the freedom to strongly criticize, even satirize, the Association, without worrying about annual re-election to the editorship. He took advantage of this freedom regularly and to great, constructive effect for many years.

Liautard, owner of the Journal, made it a vector for the propositions that he put forward and developed in all fields of activity in the veterinary profession, current or yet to come. He also used it as a weapon, with his concise and potent editorials, in which he was prompt to denounce anything that seemed, to him, an obstacle to the common good, the national interest or professional ethics.

"Undoubtedly his biting satire was a major factor in stimulating the Association to perform at an ever-increasing tempo", wrote Smithcors.

==== Organizing the profession ====
Amongst his numerous and varied professional undertakings, particular mention must be made of those concerning veterinary public health and defense of the veterinary diploma:

===== Veterinary public health =====
As early as 1880, during an outbreak of contagious bovine pleuropneumonia, Liautard urged the federal government and the States within the Union to set up a health program for the control of infectious diseases. In 1881, he demanded the creation of State veterinarians. This epidemic was so serious that it resulted in an embargo by the British government prohibiting the export of American cattle to Great Britain and Canada. In 1883, this embargo led the federal authorities to create a veterinary service within the USDA, to eradicate the disease, entrusting its direction to Daniel Elmer Salmon who, in 1884, made it the Bureau of Animal Industry. Liautard strongly encouraged his students to become involved or take a position in this newly created public service and would, if necessary, defend them. Thus in 1889, he spoke out vehemently against what he called the « political guillotine » used on public service veterinarians, victims of the spoils system which could result in their dismissal, in response to political changes, without any consideration of their competence.

===== Regulation of the veterinary diploma =====
In 1880, Liautard was the only American representative among the 65 foreign honorary members of the British veterinary evaluation organization, the Council of the Royal College of Veterinary Surgeons.

Using this British model as a basis, in January 1882 he devoted an editorial to promote the creation of a college of veterinary surgeons of America in the form of an association of member veterinarians responsible for electing a board of examiners which had the exclusive right to grant a diploma, which would be the only qualification recognized and required to exercise veterinary medicine, and which would require students to take a final exam before this board of examiners.

This project was launched in 1948 with the creation by the AVMA of the National Board of Veterinary Medical Examiners (NBVME), and the commissioning in 1954 of a National Board Examination (NBE). To avoid conflicts of interest, the NBVME is now independent of the AVMA, and has been renamed International Council for Veterinary Assessment (ICVA). In January 1998, a computerized evaluation procedure, the North American Veterinary Licensing Examination (NAVLE®) replaced the NBE

==== The promotion of scientific advances ====
At the same time, the American Veterinary Review served not only for information and professional training but also as a means to diffuse scientific knowledge thanks to contributions by the greatest European scientists working in the field of animal health, such as Louis Pasteur, Robert Koch, Edmond Nocard, Henri Toussaint, Auguste Chauveau, etc., whose articles he translated into English.

===== Support for Pasteur =====
In the very first issues of the American Veterinary Review in 1877, Liautard asserted that he was a « rational Pasteurian », adhering to the germ theory of disease, like Henri Bouley, the most illustrious French veterinarian of the time, teacher and practitioner, publishing the latter's famous lecture at the French Academy of Sciences, May 7, 1877, on the bacterial etiology of anthrax. Through his writings and teaching, he led the entire American veterinary profession to subscribe to this approach, in the same way that the French would do after Bouley, whereas in both the United States and France the medical world would do so much later.

==== Handover period: the JAVMA ====
In 1896, Roscoe R. Bell, former pupil and professor at the American Veterinary College, became co-editor with Liautard. In 1900, Dr Robert W. Ellis became owner of one-third of the Journal and was responsible for its management. Liautard continued as senior editor and Bell as editor. In September 1915, the American Veterinary Medical Association purchased the Review and the publication was renamed Journal of the American Veterinary Medical Association, the JAVMA, that we know today as the official periodical of the association of American veterinarians. Liautard, who had retired to France in 1900, continued to contribute to each issue until his death.

== Personality ==
=== The impact of Liautard on his pupils and on the veterinarians of his time ===
Smithcors writes

He was characterized as very fatherly with his students, stern, and yet intimate, without allowing familiarity. Severe and friendly, strict to all and demanding of each the exact performance of his duties, he was very much liked and yet feared more or less by all. His death in 1918 was an occasion for mourning by the veterinary profession in all parts of the world.

One of his students, J. W. Fink, who graduated from New York University in 1900 after this school had taken over the combined A.V.C.-N.Y.V.S., recalls sixty years later: "The American Veterinary Review was his last personal tie, and he supervised every line therein. He watched us as we wrapped and addressed them, and it always seemed as if he wanted to write a personal note to every veterinarian who received a copy. No detail was too small to escape his notice, and he regarded all of us as "his boys". When he left, there was a great void at the college".

"Few men could hope to live so long in the memory of their students".

=== Liautard and American nationality ===
In the obituary published in 1918 by the Société Centrale de Médecine Vétérinaire of which he had been president in 1911, one reads:

Liautard had made himself a naturalized American; he had assimilated the customs of his adoptive country to such an extent that it was difficult when seeing, hearing or reading him to guess that this personality hid someone of French origin.

Nevertheless, despite his remarkable success and perfect integration into American society, Liautard retained his French nationality. In a letter dated September 28, 1902, written from Paris to Henry MacCracken, chancellor of New York University, who had begged Liautard to return to New York to take up the post of dean of New York University New York American Veterinary College, Liautard replied: "the fact that I kept my nationality could raise objections, as was the case when I lived in New York". Smithcors also mentioned: "Although he lived in the United States for forty years and amassed a small fortune, he never became a citizen. For much of his life here he was referred to affectionately as "Frenchy" by his closest associates – although perhaps not to his face".

=== An element of mystery ===
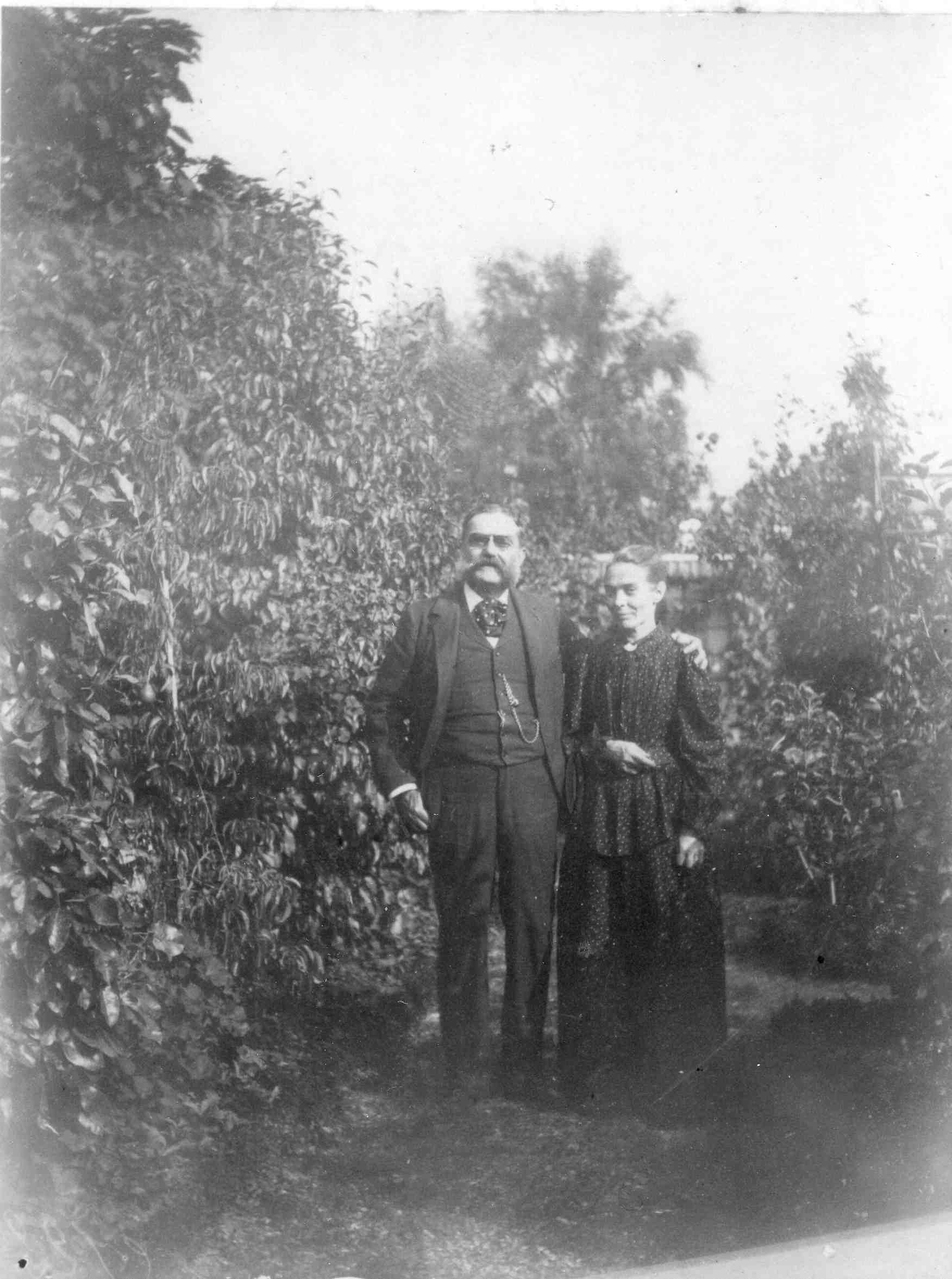
Alexandre Liautard with his wife, no doubt in the garden of their home, la Mare aux Cerfs, at Bois-Jérôme-Saint-Ouen, in the Eure

The reasons for his expulsion as a pupil from the Veterinary School of Alfort at the beginning of his fourth academic year, for "grave misconduct", after he had already received a reprimand in his 3rd year, remain unknown. It stands to reason that such a forceful and outspoken character getting into conflict with some of his superiors who were not lucky enough to meet his esteem. It is not impossible that he made them aware of this in the same scathing terms that he would later use in America to stigmatize colleagues who hadn't either. If this was the case, and knowing the extremely severe disciplinary regulations in French veterinary schools at this time, one can understand the sanction that followed. Liautard does not seem to have borne any grudge against the School of Alfort, and certainly not against the most illustrious figures that were there at that time, notably the director Eugène Renault, and the clinical professor Henri Bouley, to whom he paid tribute on numerous occasions in his Review.

Nor do we dispose of any financial accounts of his professional activity which enabled him to amass a "small fortune" according to Smithcors, but we can guess that he not only exerted powerful leadership within the school, of which he was the owner, but also had the eminent and lucrative position of being the most prominent veterinary practitioner in New York at this time.

His total investment in both his teaching and professional activities, right to the very end of his life, meant that his return to France not only came as a surprise but also created a vacuum that was difficult to fill, to such an extent that, as indicated above, the chancellor of New York University, Henry MacCracken, asked him to return to exercise his function as dean. It has been suggested that Liautard was too attached to his only daughter to agree to be separated from her when she returned to France. His devotion to the end to his wife, now in a state of profound mental impairment, also shows that, at that moment, he chose what he considered to be his family duty after devoting forty years of his life to his profession, even if he continued to serve this latter until the very end of his life.

== Distinctions and tributes ==
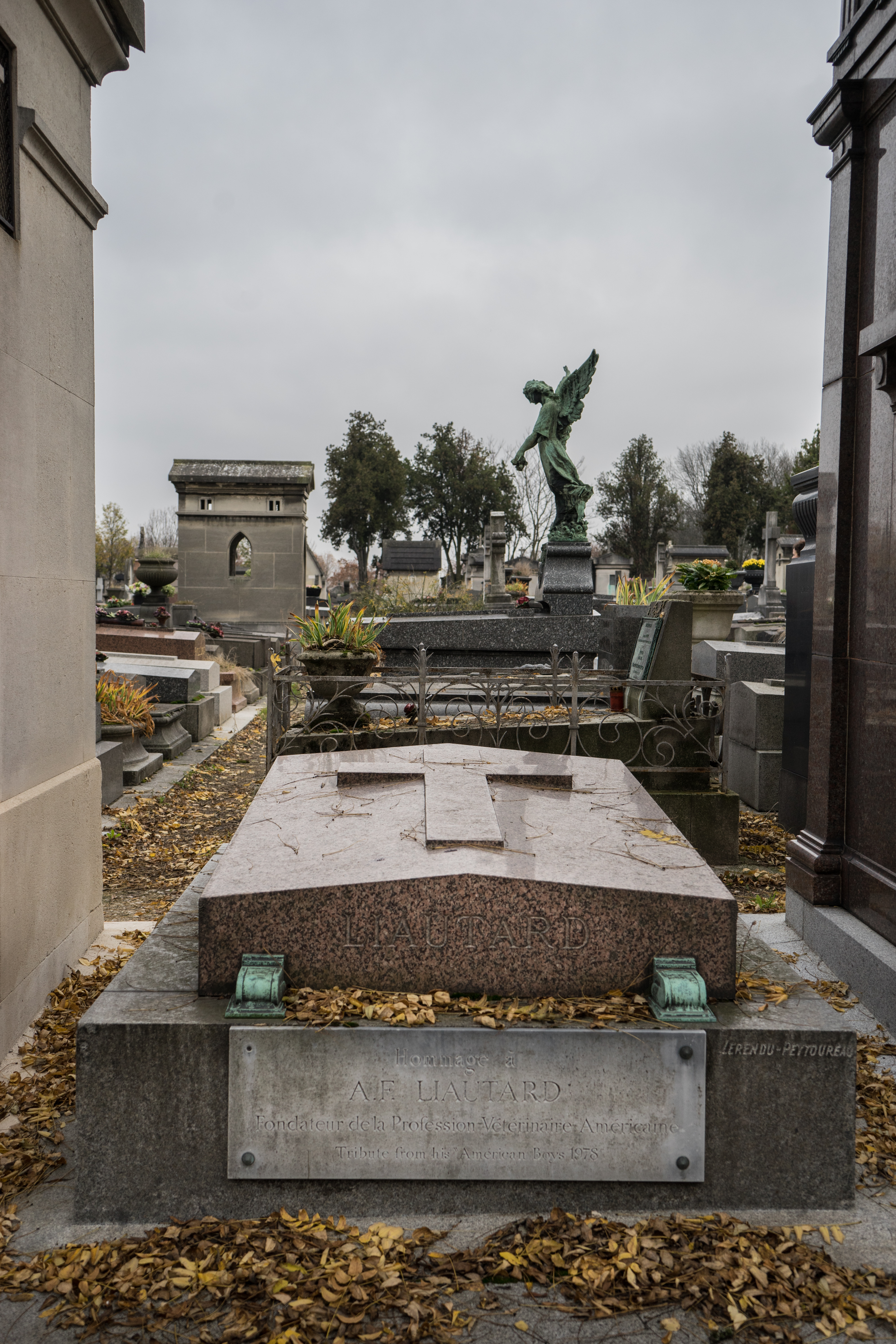
Grave of Alexandre Liautard at the Père Lachaise cemetery, in Paris. Located in the 93rd division, his tomb is situated almost in front of that of Oscar Wilde.

The only French distinctions that Liautard received were those of Knight of the Order of Agricultural Merit and Knight of the Legion of Honor. His Legion of Honor certificate indicates that this was awarded in recognition of services rendered in facilitating the installation of the Pasteur Institute at New York, he was the veterinary consultant. The greatest tribute rendered to Alexandre Liautard is to be honored today, as he was when still alive, and as written on the marker at the Père Lachaise cemetery, as the "Father of the American Veterinary Profession".

== Reviews and works ==
- American Veterinary Review, from January 1877 until September 1915, volumes 1 to 47.
- Journal of the American Medical Association, from October 1915 until April 1918, volumes 1 to 4..
- Animal castration, W.R. Jenkins ed., New York; Baillière, Tyndall & Cox, ed., London, 1884 2nd édition in 1885, 11th édition in 1905.
- Lameness of horses and diseases of the lococomotive apparatus W.R. Jenkins ed., New York, 1888. Re-editions in 1890 and 1897.
- The diseases of livestock and their most efficient remedies in collaboration with William B. Miller, Willis P. Hazard & Lloyd Tellor, Mc Kay ed., Philadelphia, 1890.
- Manual of operative veterinary surgery, Sabiston & Murray ed., New York, 1892.
- Vademecum of veterinary anatomy ː for use of advanced veterinary students and veterinary surgeons, American veterinary college ed., New York, 1877 2nd and 3rd éditions by W.R.Jenkins, in 1879 and 1890.
- How to tell the age of domestic animals ? W.R. Jenkins ed., New York, 1885
- Translation into English of several French works in veterinary medicine.
