= Clostridial vaccine =

Vaccine for sheep and cattle

A clostridial vaccine is a vaccine for sheep and cattle that protects against diseases caused by toxins produced by an infection with one or more Clostridium bacteria. Clostridial vaccines are often administered to pregnant ewes a few weeks before they are due to give birth, in order to give passive immunity to their lambs. Clostridial bacteria multiply rapidly in infected sheep, and produce large amounts of toxin which can cause the sheep to die within hours.

Clostridial vaccines can contain anti-toxins to one or more endotoxins produced by the following bacteria:

- Clostridium chauvoei
- Clostridium haemolyticum
- Clostridium novyi
- Clostridium perfringens
- Clostridium septicum
- Clostridium sordellii
- Clostridium tetani

Clostridial vaccines which protect sheep against multiple clostridial diseases have been available since the 1950s.
