= Cattle drenching =

Administration of anti-parasite drugs to cattle

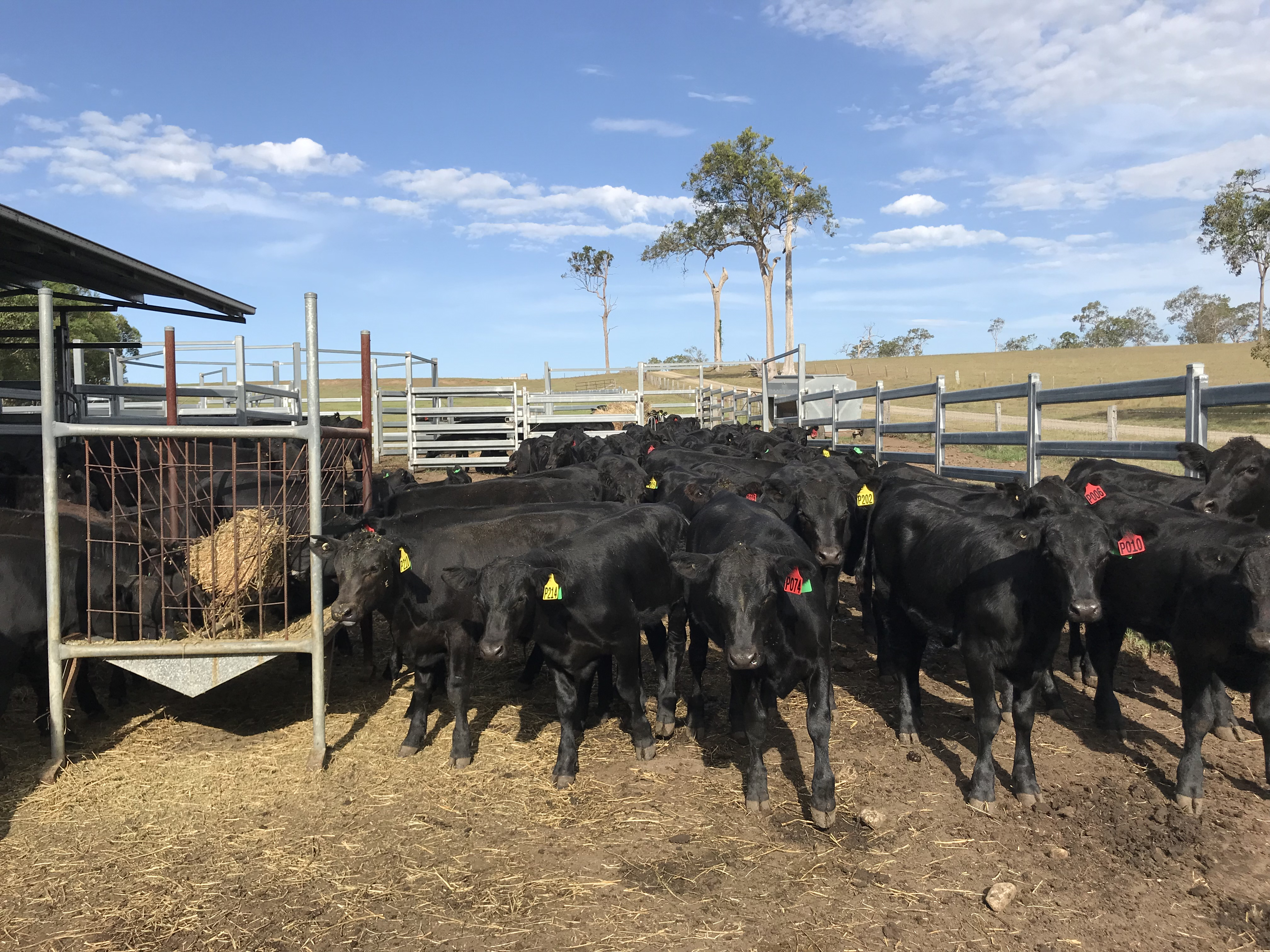
Angus weaners, approximately 6-9 months old, just taken off their mothers in Northern NSW Clarence Valley

Cattle drenching is the process of administering chemical solutions (anthelmintics) to cattle with the purpose of protecting livestock from various parasites including worms, fluke, cattle ticks, lice and flies. Parasites hinder the production of cattle through living off their host and carrying diseases that can be transmitted to cattle. Cattle drenches can be applied through a solution poured on the back, throat or an injection. Cattle drenches are predominately necessary for young cattle with weaker immune systems that are susceptible to parasite infestation. Drenching is a common method for controlling parasites in the meat and dairy industries. Drenching cattle improves the health, condition and fertility of cattle leading to increased calving rates, weight gain, hide condition and milk production.

== Application of drenches ==
=== Pour-on (Back-spraying) ===
Pour-on drench is applied to the back of cattle and is the most common method used. The process involves a water-based chemical solution applied to the back of an animal through a squirting pump attached to a pack worn on the back of the operator. The chemical then seeps into the skin on the back of the animal and into the bloodstream of the animal protecting and eradicating the parasites on the animal. Pour-on options have now become the most popular option due to the speed of application allowing large numbers of to be processed quickly. The amount of drench used depends on the weight of the cows; normally the drench is 1 or 2 mL per 10–20 kg. Pour-on has, however, been one of the causes of increased resistance to drench products due to the process of back application which once dried allows flies and ticks to become accustomed to the chemical at a low effect level.

=== Oral ===
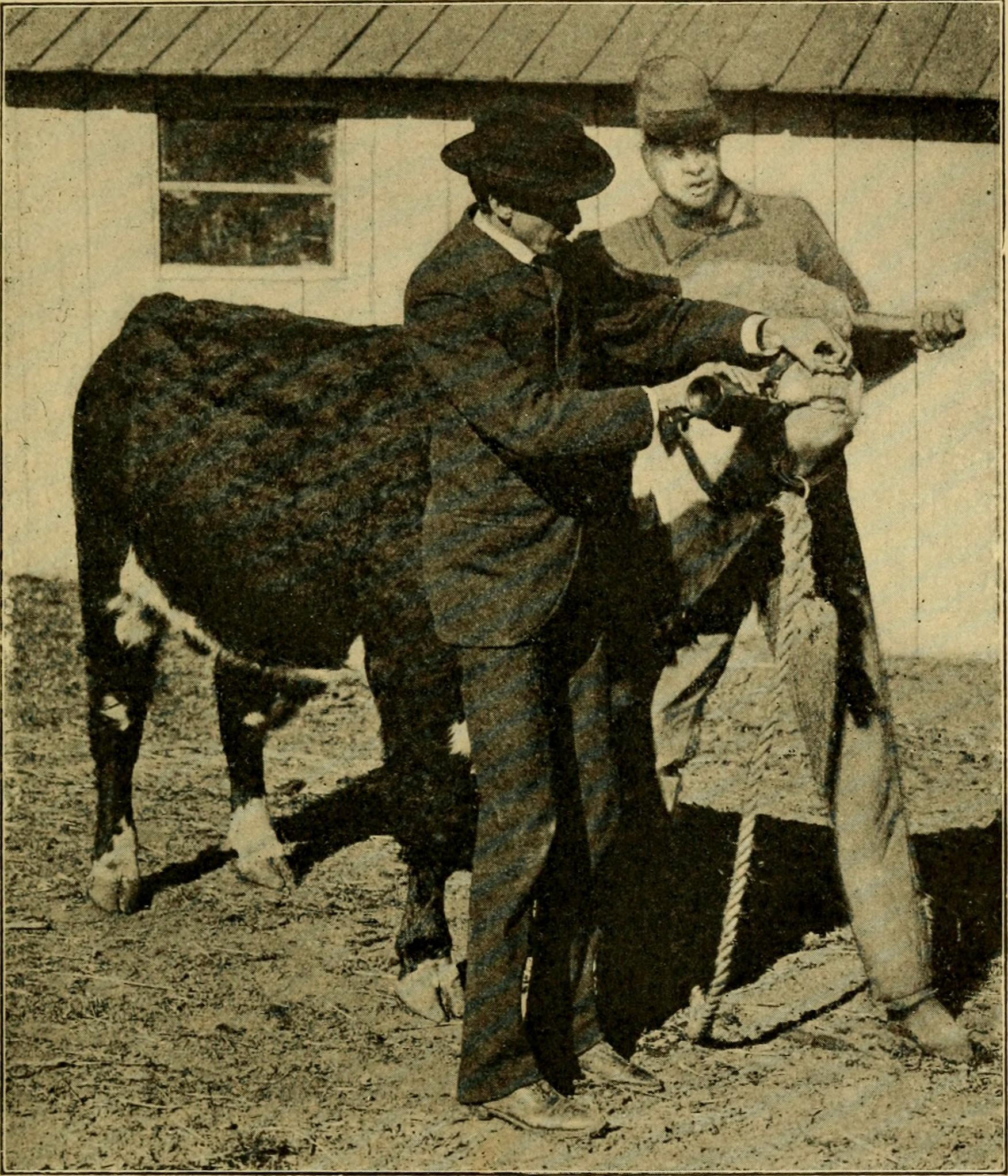
The care of animals - a book of brief and popular advice on the diseases and ailments of farm animals (1905) (14782192692) Illustrating Oral Drenching

Using an oral drench gun attached to the back of the operator, anthelmintic chemicals which are in a pack worn on the back are administered down the throat of the animal. The operator must put the cow's head in a head bail or crush and use one hand to pry open its mouth and the other to slowly release the drench into the throat. Oral drenching can cause problems if the drench is administered to the wrong part of the throat causing the drench to go into the lungs. This could potentially kill or make a cow seriously ill. The trachea leading to the lungs is located at the middle-back of the throat. The oesophagus is in the back left and this is where the stomach is located and where the drench should be administered. Care must be taken not to damage the tongue, gums or throat.

=== Injection ===
Injection is applied through a syringe to the neck or shoulders of the cow. Depending on the type of chemical used it can either be injected into the skin or muscle of the neck. The amount of drench used depends on the weight of the cows, but is usually between 2-5 mL. No more than one dose should be administered, as two doses could lead to death or serious sickness. Injecting cattle needs to be done carefully as irritation can cause large lumps on the side of the beast and be rendered ineffective.

== Cattle parasites ==
=== Buffalo fly ===
The buffalo fly (Haematobia exigua) is a very common pest among cattle producers. The fly is a small blood sucking parasite that is widely considered the most serious health problem to cattle in warm and moist areas of the cattle industry. Buffalo flies cause sores and ulcers causing large hide impairments on cattle as they rub themselves causing disturbances in feeding and hide quality reduction. Beef cattle can average a loss of 15 kg and dairy cattle 0.5 L of milk a day if untreated in a buffalo fly season. Macrocyclic lactones and benzimidazoles in the form of pour on solutions are the most commonly used drench formula, however other drenches and fly tags are also used. Buffalo flies impact cattle the most during spring-summer when temperatures are high and a wet summer will increase their impact due to prime conditions for breeding.

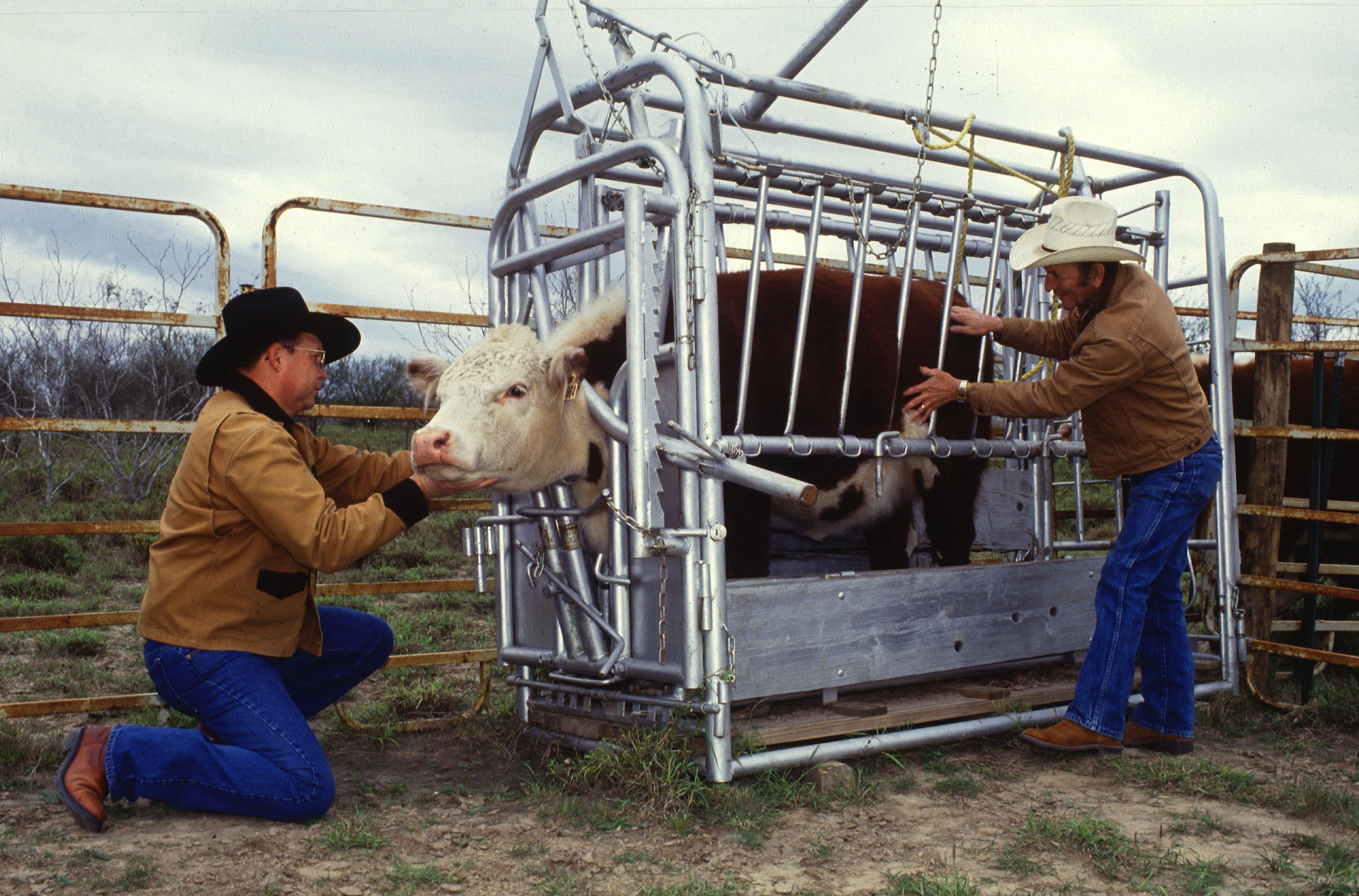
Cattle inspected for ticks

=== Cattle tick ===
Cattle ticks (Rhipicephalus microplus) feed on cattle by burrowing into their hide and accessing their blood. Cattle ticks also cause tick fever triggering anaemia, high temperatures, and weakness which can potentially lead to death. Tick fever is caused by the diseases Babesia bigemina, Babesia bovis, or Anaplasma marginale which are transmitted by cattle ticks. The disease initially causes anaemia, licking and rubbing at bite sites (tick worry), tick sores, ulceration and lack of energy. Heavy infestations over a period of time lead to rapid weight loss and potentially death. Bos indicus (tropical breeds) are less susceptible to cattle ticks and build resistance quicker than Bos taurus (European breeds). Drenches are used as both a repellent and eradicator of ticks; however, in some cases they may not kill the tick or stop them taking the host. Cattle ticks are found most commonly in warm bush areas and are most prevalent in late spring to early summer.

=== Liver fluke ===
Liver fluke (Fasciola hepatica) is a parasite which is part of the Trematoda family. The fluke lives inside a cow's liver after they have hatched in water or swampy areas and grown. Liver fluke cause a variety of diseases and health issues due to their migration from the liver causing blood loss and liver failure. The diseases caused by liver fluke include acute fasciolosis (short term), chronic fasciolosis (long term) and Black disease (Clostridium novyi). The health impacts include anaemia, loss of appetite, bottle jaw and liver failure, which can result in death. Liver fluke is most commonly found in areas with high rainfall due to their natural habitat patterns. Cattle can lose 0.7-1.2 kg per week from liver fluke depending on the level of infestation. Drenches that target liver fluke include triclabendazole, nitroxynil or clorsulon; however, only triclabendazole will kill fluke at all stages in their life cycle. It is recommended to drench for fluke in winter-early spring as only adult liver fluke will be present.

=== Lice ===
Lice are the most commonly treated parasite due to the quantity and rate of infestations once infest a herd. Lice cause cattle to rub, bite and scratch, causing disturbances in feeding and loss of hide quality. There are four types of lice that occur on cattle: biting lice (Bovicola bovis), short-nosed sucking lice (Haematopinus eurysternus) long-nosed sucking lice (Linognathus vituli), and small blue sucking lice (Solenopotes capillatus). Sucking lice cause the most issues as they pierce the skin and suck blood from the host, causing the most irritation and resulting in loss in weight gain, condition and nutrition levels, especially in winter. The use of macrocyclic lactones in many large cattle industries has decreased levels of lice infestation and is an effective treatment if cattle show signs of lice activity. Lice are more prominent during winter months due to the longer hair and often worse condition of cattle resulting in easier lice infestations.

=== Small brown stomach worm ===
The small brown stomach worm (Ostertagia ostertagi) is present in large numbers of herds in cooler, high rainfall areas and is linked to high levels of production losses in weaners and young cattle. Small brown worms do not feed on blood but damage the lining of the stomach as they reach adulthood. In more severe cases they cause death, collapses, weight loss, damage and inflammation of the gut resulting in diarrhoea and scours. Macrocyclic lactones are the most common form of drenches used in the pour on form; however oral benzimidazole (BZ) drenches provide similar control.

== Categories of drenches ==
Anthelmintic is any drug that acts to expel parasites mainly helminths from the host's body through either stunning or killing the parasite. They aim is to expel the parasite without causing harm to the host. There are a wide range of anthelmintic drugs that can be used however three classes are available for sale on the livestock market including Macrocyclic Lactones, Benzimidazoles and Levamisole. However, anthelmintic chemotherapy is costly and all major parasites in all major agricultural hosts have varying degrees of resistance worldwide.

=== Macrocyclic lactones (avermectins and milbemycins) ===
Macrocyclic lactones (avermectins and milbemycins) are chemical products of soil microorganisms developed in the 1970s/1980s for cattle use. Macrocyclic lactones offer a wide range of internal and external parasite protection. They are a commonly used drench and this is due to their low impact on cattle production and ability to expel adult parasites through to immature parasites (larvae). Macrocyclic lactones also exhibit relatively long periods of persistent activity within cattle this is good for a long feeding season but leads to increased resistance. They have been open to for producers for over 40 years in the commercial form and continue to be effective in expelling parasites even with the increasing resistance issues. Five types of macrocyclic lactones active ingredients are used: eprinomectin, moxidectin, ivermectin, doramectin and abamectin. All five ingredients can be administered through easy to use pour-on solutions (Back Spraying) and some oral drenches. Macrocyclic lactones offer an overall protection from most parasites and a longer period then other drench formulas.

=== Benzimidazoles ===
Benzimidazoles are another chemical family which is effective in the eradication of some parasite infections with particular focus on nematodes and trematodes. The original benzimidazole was thiabendazole; however, other, newer chemicals have been introduced with a range of commercial names. All but one benzimidazole product must be administered orally which has led to their reduction in use as pour-on drenches are more popular due to their easy administration. The active ingredients used are albendazole, oxfendazole, triclabendazole and fenbendazole. Triclabendazole is the most commonly used drench for controlling liver fluke; it kills liver fluke at all stages of its life cycle.

=== Levamisole ===
Levamisole is another chemical that has more impact in expelling the adult parasites in livestock however exhibits less effective rates in reducing larvae. Levamisole is available for administration by injection, pour-on and oral routes which offers a variety of choice which is found in the commercial chemicals. Some products use levamisole in conjunction with other chemicals. Levamisole is most commonly used to treat fluke and worms.

== Biological impact ==
The main biological impact of drenches is the expelling of any parasites, flies, worms and other insects which come in contact with the cattle drenched. This, in turn, impacts the number of parasites in their habitat and such flies, worms and other insects ability to reproduce and impacts the role that they play in the ecosystem. Some parasites are vital in protecting some animals from diseases and bacteria.

In addition, the chemicals used to expel parasites are often still present in faeces that is excreted by cattle the impact of this on the environment comes in a few forms. Many dung dwelling insects are adversely affected by the process as dung is a habitat and full of minerals needed by animals. Some chemicals once excreted from cattle are poisonous to dung beetles resulting in reduced habitat, less feeding and mating grounds and even mortality of some dung beetles. If dung beetles are impacted then the role in fertilising the land and spreading cow dung will be decreased. In particular, ivermectin from treated cattle is still present in their faeces which reduces the invertebrate colonisation of faecal pats in both numbers and diversity, thus hindering the natural breakdown process.

Some chemicals used infiltrate the meat and can stay in the system of the animal for a period of time. The chemicals which are applied to cattle may potentially thus need a period of time where the owners cannot sell, butcher or transport the cattle. These withholding periods are needed due to this infiltration of chemicals into the meat of cattle which need time to break down the chemical residues. Cattle may also be under an export slaughter interval which means they can not be transported or slaughtered overseas for a period of time. The potential impacts of an early kill or even a natural death followed by wildlife eating the animal would see the meat sold permeated with the chemicals causing sickness or death.

== Resistance to drenching ==
Resistance to drenches occurs through a genetic feature of the parasite, fly or worm that results in minimal or zero impact by the drench. Resistance to drenches first became known in the mid-1960s, however, widespread education was only used in the 1980s when farmers were educated on the unnecessary use of drenches in controlling parasites and to the need to create a wider range of drenches to stop resistance.

Resistance to drenches has been controlled since however concerns about the build-up of these parasites with resistance in a colony is an issue. This occurs when the parasite survives and passes on their genes to the next generation. If the genetic selection becomes a major part of the gene makeup of the colony, then issues arise in controlling and new drenches must be manufactured.

Resistance to drenching chemicals occurs due to over-drenching, under-dosing, long-acting treatments, low worm population treatment and consistent use of the same drench. Causing drench resistance is a common occurrence on smaller isolated communities and is an issue for agricultural industries that relies on clean cattle to trade.

There are different management strategies to manage resistance to drenches including avoiding unnecessary drenching to older cattle, using shorter-acting drenches when possible and using the correct dose while varying the drench used year to year.

== See also ==
- Deworming
- Plunge dip
