= Blackleg (disease) =

Bacterial disease of animals

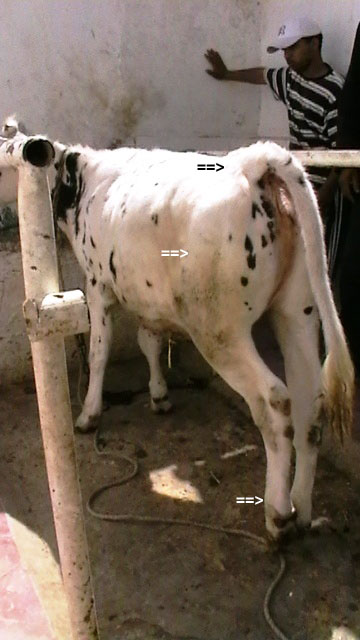
Early signs: swelling of the thigh, with leg up and tail raised (arrows)

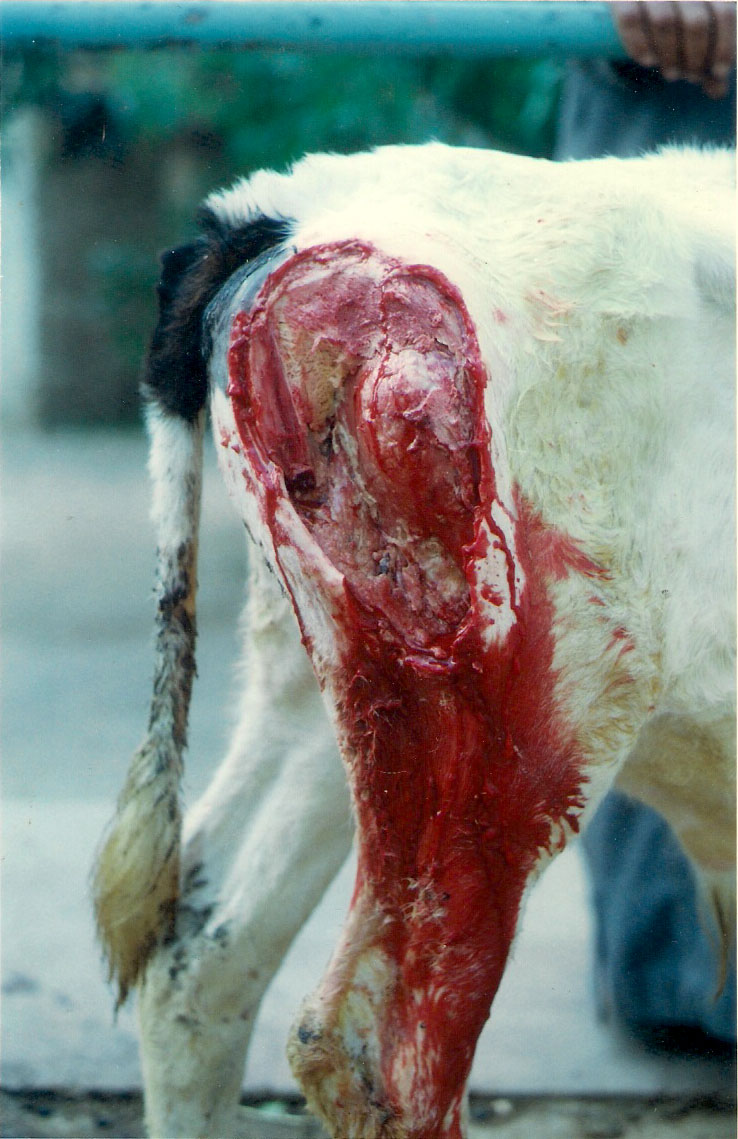
Recovering calf after removal of all necrotic tissue

Blackleg, black quarter, quarter evil, or quarter ill (Latin: gangraena emphysematosa) is an infectious bacterial disease most commonly caused by Clostridium chauvoei, a Gram-positive bacterial species. It is seen in livestock all over the world, usually affecting cattle, sheep, and goats. It has been seen occasionally in farmed bison and deer. The acute nature of the disease makes successful treatment difficult, and the efficacy of the commonly used vaccine is disputed.

== Susceptibility ==
Most losses due to blackleg occur when the cattle are between the ages of six months and two years, although it can occur when they are as young as two months. Typically, cattle that have a high feed intake and are well-conditioned tend to be the most susceptible to blackleg. Furthermore, many blackleg cases occur during the hot and humid summer months or after a sudden cold period, but cases can occur at any time during the year.

== Causative agent ==
Blackleg is caused by infection with Clostridium bacteria. The most common causative agent is C. chauvoei, but the disease can also be caused by C. septicum, C. sordelli, and C. novyi. C. chauvoei is Gram-positive, rod-shaped, anaerobic, and motile, and can produce environmentally persistent spores when conditions are not ideal for growth. These spores can remain in the soil for years in an inactive state, and return to their infectious form when consumed by grazing livestock. Contaminated pasture is a predominant source of these organisms, which are also found naturally in the intestines of animals. Cases can occur over many years in areas where soil or manure is contaminated with the bacteria, and it is exceedingly difficult to remove the spores from the environment.

C. chauvoei can produce a large amount of gas as a metabolic byproduct when growing and reproducing, hence the alternate name gas gangrene, present in humans. This gas builds up in infected tissue, usually large muscles, and causes the tissue to make a crackling or popping sound when pressed. Large gas-filled blisters can also form, which can be extremely painful as they build up in the tissues.

== Clinical presentations ==
When infection begins, the animal may develop a fever, and the affected limb can feel hot to the touch. The limb usually swells significantly, and the animal can develop lameness on the affected leg. Crepitation (the sensation of air under the skin) can be noticed in many infections, as the area seems to crackle under pressure.

Once clinical signs develop, the animal may only live a short while, sometimes as few as 12 hours. Occasionally, cattle succumb to the disease without showing any symptoms, and only a necropsy reveals the cause. During a necropsy, a diagnosis is usually made very quickly, as the affected muscle is usually mottled with black patches, which are dead tissue, killed by the toxins the bacteria release when they infect live tissue. If viewed under a microscope, small rod-like bacteria can be seen to confirm the diagnosis.

== Vaccination and prevention ==
The use of a seven-way clostridial vaccination is the most common and cost effective preventative measure taken against blackleg, but its efficacy is disputed. Burning the upper layer of soil to eradicate left-over spores is the best way to stop the spread of blackleg from diseased cattle. Diseased cattle should be isolated. Treatment is generally unrewarding due to the rapid progression of the disease, but penicillin is the drug of choice for treatment. Treatment is only effective in the early stages and as a control measure.

== See also ==
- Blackleg (potatoes)
- Clostridial vaccine
- Gas gangrene
