= First cattle dip =

Coordinates: 29.756707°S 30.268522°E

The first cattle dip is a provincial heritage site in Richmond in the KwaZulu-Natal province of South Africa.

In 1994 it was described in the Government Gazette as

The first cattle dip to be constructed in South Africa... Built of bricks and mortar; roof of curved corrugated iron sheets supported by gum poles;...This site is one of great significance in the development of stock farming in Southern Africa.
