= Clostridium novyi-NT =

Clostridium novyi -NT

Scientific classification
- Domain: Bacteria
- Kingdom: Bacillati
- Phylum: Bacillota
- Class: Clostridia
- Order: Eubacteriales
- Family: Clostridiaceae
- Genus: Clostridium
- Species: C. novyi
- Strain: C. n. -NT

Trionomial name
- Clostridium novyi -NT

Strain of bacteria

Clostridium novyi-NT is an attenuated strain of Clostridium novyi that is under investigation as a cancer treatment. It is one of several pathogenic species of Clostridium bacteria that have been examined for this purpose. The modification eliminated the secretion of α-toxin.

== Mechanism of action ==
Syngeneic and xenograft experimental tumors across multiple animal species were treated with injected or intravenous C. novyi-NT spores, including colon and pancreatic cancers in mice, aggressive squamous cell carcinoma in rabbits, and glioblastomas in rats.

Effects included hemorrhagic necrosis, tumor cell lysis, and tumor regression. Intratumoral application increased spore concentrations in the tumor and reduced side effects. Bacteriolysis in hypoxic tumor parts can be combined with chemotherapy and/or radiation that are more effective in proliferating, non-hypoxic areas at the cost of increased toxicity.

Normal cells are generally not hypoxic, preventing these bacteria from penetrating such tumors. Bacteria also potentially can stimulate the immune system, possibly offsetting the tumor-induced immunosuppression, such as from PD-L1.

== Clostridium novyi ==
C. novyi is ubiquitous in soil and feces and can infect mammals. Rare human infections can lead to gas gangrene are often fatal particularly after wounds or drug use. It secretes α-toxin.

Among the various Clostridium strains that have been examined, pathogenic strains have a stronger oncolytic effect than others.

== History ==
In 2014, researchers found that a modified strain of Clostridium novyi bacteria caused tumor shrinkage without damaging normal cells. Initial tests on mice were followed by tests on canines with naturally occurring cancers and on one human patient. The anaerobic bacteria stimulated an immune response at the site of the tumor destruction.

Of the sixteen dogs with soft-tissue sarcoma treated with the C. novyi-NT therapeutic, three tumors disappeared for as long as two years, and another three reduced tumor size 30%. When the bacteria reached the edge of the tumor, they stopped killing cells around them due to the oxygen present in the environment of normal body tissue. The 53-year-old female human patient, experienced almost total destruction of her myosarcoma within days. A phase 1 clinical trial (NCT01924689) began in 2014.

== See also ==
- C. acetobutylicum
- C. beijerinckii 19
- C. butyricum
- C. tetani
- C. histolyticum 17 and 18
- C. sporogenes ATCC13732
- Salmonella typhimurium
