= Jetha v R =

South African legal case

Jetha v Rex is an important case in South African criminal law, with its bearing on the defence of impossibility. It was heard in the Natal Provincial Division on April 22, 1929, by Dove-Wilson JP, Tatham J and Matthews J. It was an appeal from the Durban Magistrate's Court. TB Horwood appeared for the appellant and JDM Rosenow for the Crown. The appellant's attorneys were CP Robinson & Goulding.

== Facts ==
The appellant sailed for India on October 11, 1926; his estate was provisionally sequestrated on October 13, 1926. In March 1929, after his return, he was convicted of contravening section 142(a) of the Insolvency Act, in that he had failed to attend the first meeting of his creditors, held on November 11, 1926.

The magistrate, in his reasons, stated that he was satisfied, on the facts set out above, that it was physically impossible for appellant to attend the meeting. He convicted the appellant because he must have been aware, when he left the Union, of the act of insolvency which must have preceded his sequestration. His failure to attend the meeting, therefore, was due to his own fault in leaving the Union with knowledge of such act. The magistrate referred to R v Mahomed Abbas and R v Mayer Brothers, and said that, since the trial, his attention had been drawn to the case of R v Moosa.

== Judgment ==
Dove-Wilson JP held on appeal for the Natal Provincial Division that the appellant did not know and could not have known of the date of the meeting until after it was held. In addition, it would have been physically impossible for him to attend even if he had known the date. There was, therefore, no ground for his conviction.

In Rex v Korsten, a slightly earlier case, Dove-Wilson JP had rejected the defence of impossibility, since in there the duty with which the accused had failed to comply was an absolute one: "It is no excuse for him to say that he was ignorant [of the law...]. It was his duty to make himself aware of it, and if his neglect to do so has brought about his failure [to comply...], he has contravened the law."

== See also ==
- South African criminal law
- South African law of insolvency
