= Clostridium chauvoei =

Scientific classification
- Domain: Bacteria
- Kingdom: Bacillati
- Phylum: Bacillota
- Class: Clostridia
- Order: Eubacteriales
- Family: Clostridiaceae
- Genus: Clostridium
- Species: C. chauvoei

Binomial name
- Clostridium chauvoei (Arloing et al. 1887) Scott 1928

Species of bacterium

Clostridium chauvoei is an anaerobic, motile, Gram-positive bacterium. It is a soil-borne pathogen that can cause blackleg in cattle and sheep. It is named after Auguste Chauveau, a French bacteriologist and veterinarian.

It is mainly considered to be an veterinary pathogen, but at least two severe cases of human infection have been reported. Indigenous knowledge from Fula people in Cameroon and Maasai people in Tanzania suggest that zoonotic infection with C. chauvoei may be common among pastoralists. However, these reports may also be due to infection with other Clostridium strains that can cause blackleg, such as C. septicum.

A study conducted in Taiwan found a correlation between flooding and how often C. chauvoei was found in soil samples. This is attributed to flood waters dispersing the bacteria throughout the environment.

== See also ==
- Clostridium vaccine
- Clostridium septicum
