= R v Korsten =

South African legal case

Rex v Korsten is an important case in South African criminal law, with its bearing on the defence of impossibility. It was heard in the Natal Provincial Division on February 7, 1927, by Dove-Wilson JP, Carter J and Matthews J. The case was an application for a ruling in terms of section 58 of the Criminal and Magistrates' Courts Procedure (Amendment) Act, in respect of a decision by the Magistrate of Eshowe.

== Facts ==
An accused person drove his cattle to be dipped in a township dip, but was prevented from dipping them by the township foreman, because he had not complied with a by-law which provided that no person should use the dipping tank except upon production of coupons previously purchased entitling him to do so. The accused's excuse for not having purchased such coupons was that he had not known it was necessary to do so.

== Argument ==
Lennox Ward for the Crown referred to Rex v Dabulamanzi; Rex v Nkombo.

== Judgment ==
The court held that, inasmuch as Act 14 of 1911 imposed an absolute duty on the accused to dip his cattle, the facts above set out afforded no defence:

Under the Stock Diseases Act the obligation to dip is imperative. The accused had to dip and had to arrange accordingly, either by providing a tank for himself or making use of one belonging to somebody else; and it is no excuse for him to say that he was ignorant of a condition precedent to the use of the tank which he elected to dip at. It was his duty to make himself aware of it, and if his neglect to do so has brought about his failure to dip in accordance with the law, he has contravened the law.

In Jetha v R, some two years later, Dove-Wilson JP found that the requirements of impossibility had been met.

== See also ==
- South African criminal law
