= Plunge dip =

Bath designed to immerse livestock in liquid

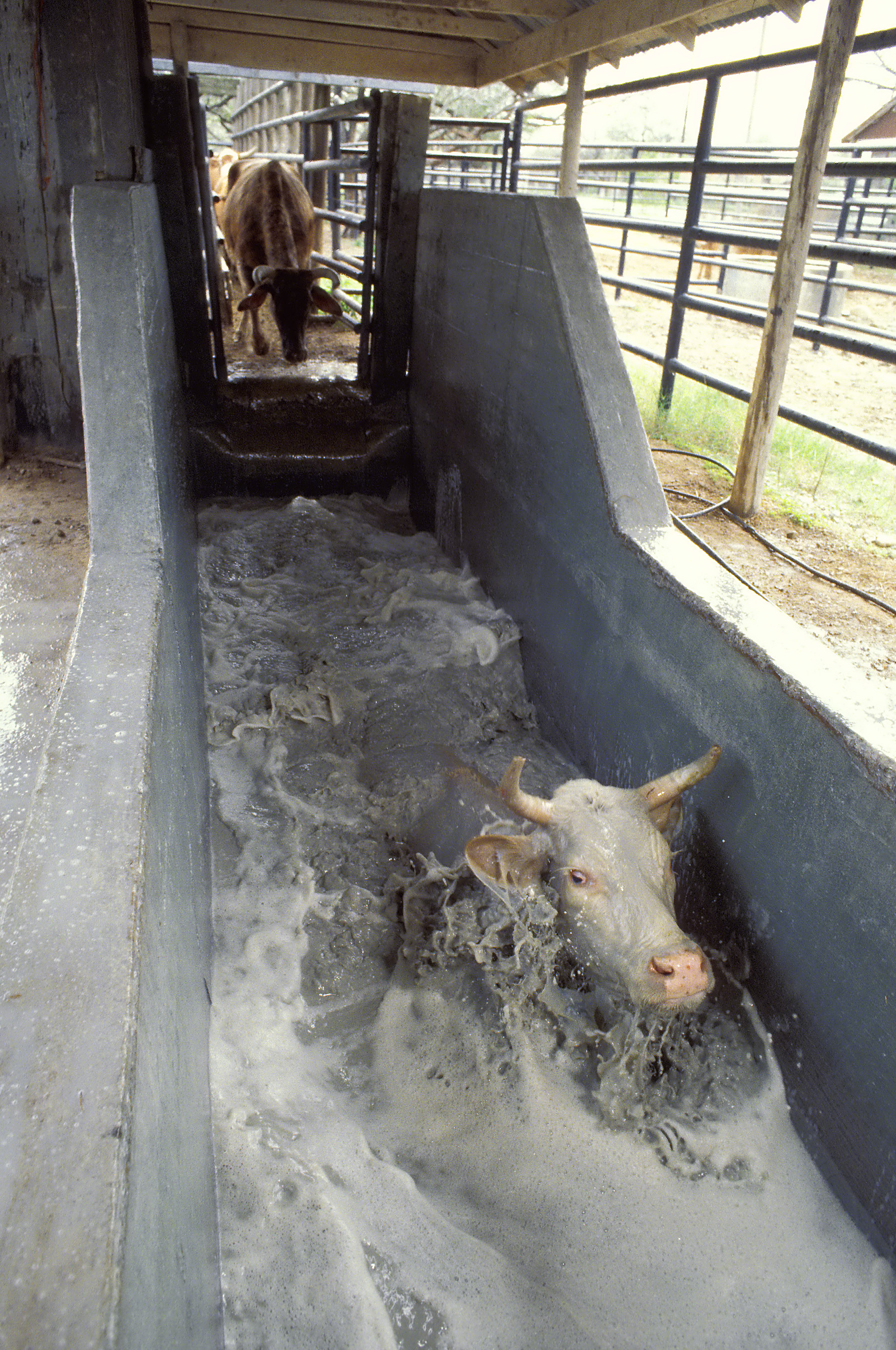
Cattle being treated against ticks in a plunge dip

A plunge dip (also known as a dipping vat, dipping tank or, simply, a dip) is a bath designed to immerse livestock in liquid pesticide or other treatment.

== Design ==
Typically a dip is designed as a narrow channel (about the width of the animal) through which the animals walk, immersing them in progressively deeper liquid until the animal is completely immersed (apart from its head so it can breathe). The channel then becomes progressively shallower until the animal exits. Because many animals can walk through the channel one after another, it is an efficient method of delivering pesticide or other liquid treatments to a large herd.

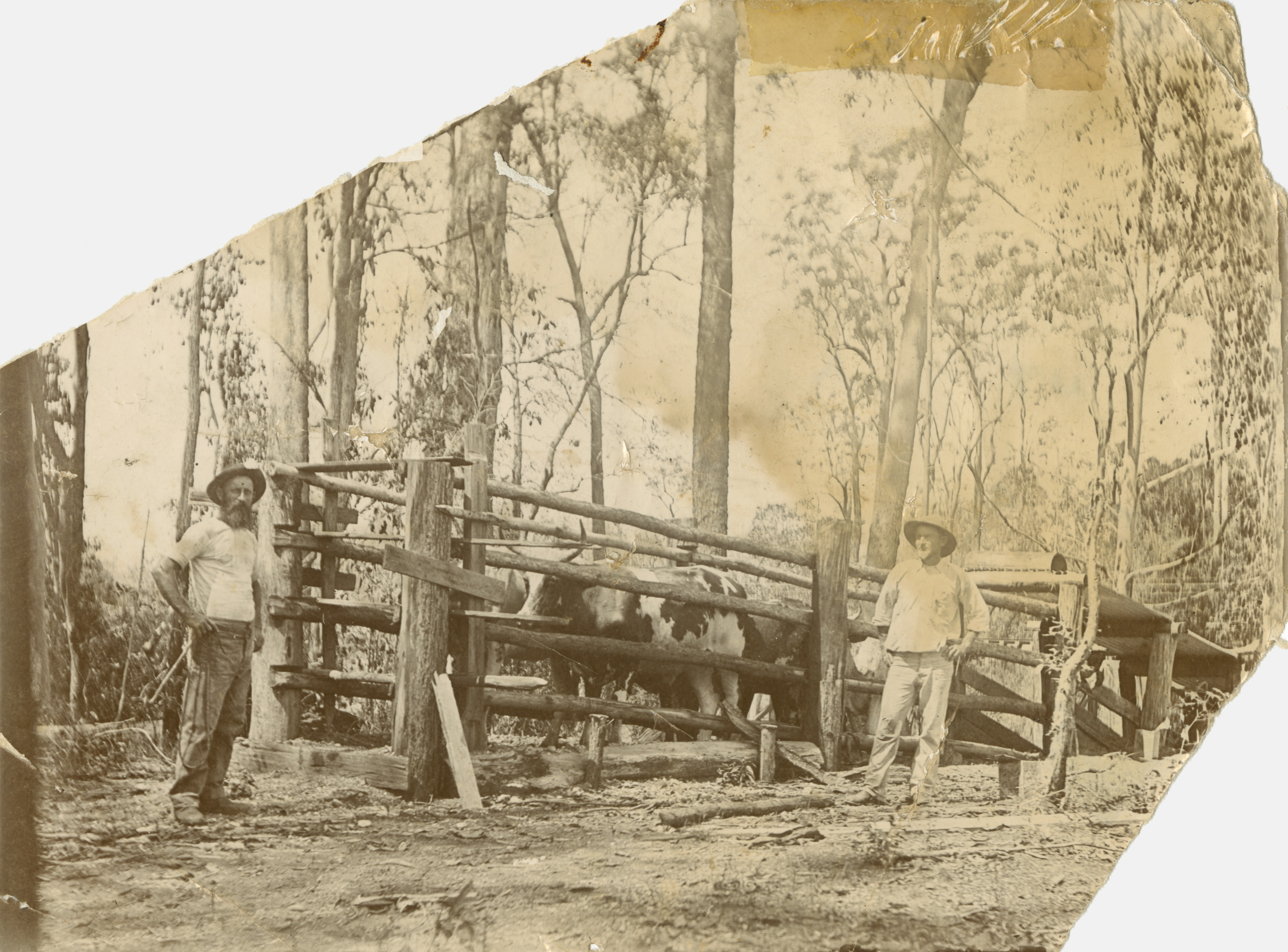
Early cattle dip in Queensland Australia. ca 1900

A liquid product used to treat the livestock by immersion in a plunge dip is also known as a dip (e.g. sheep dip).

== See also ==
- R v Korsten
- Cattle drenching
