= Auguste Chauveau =

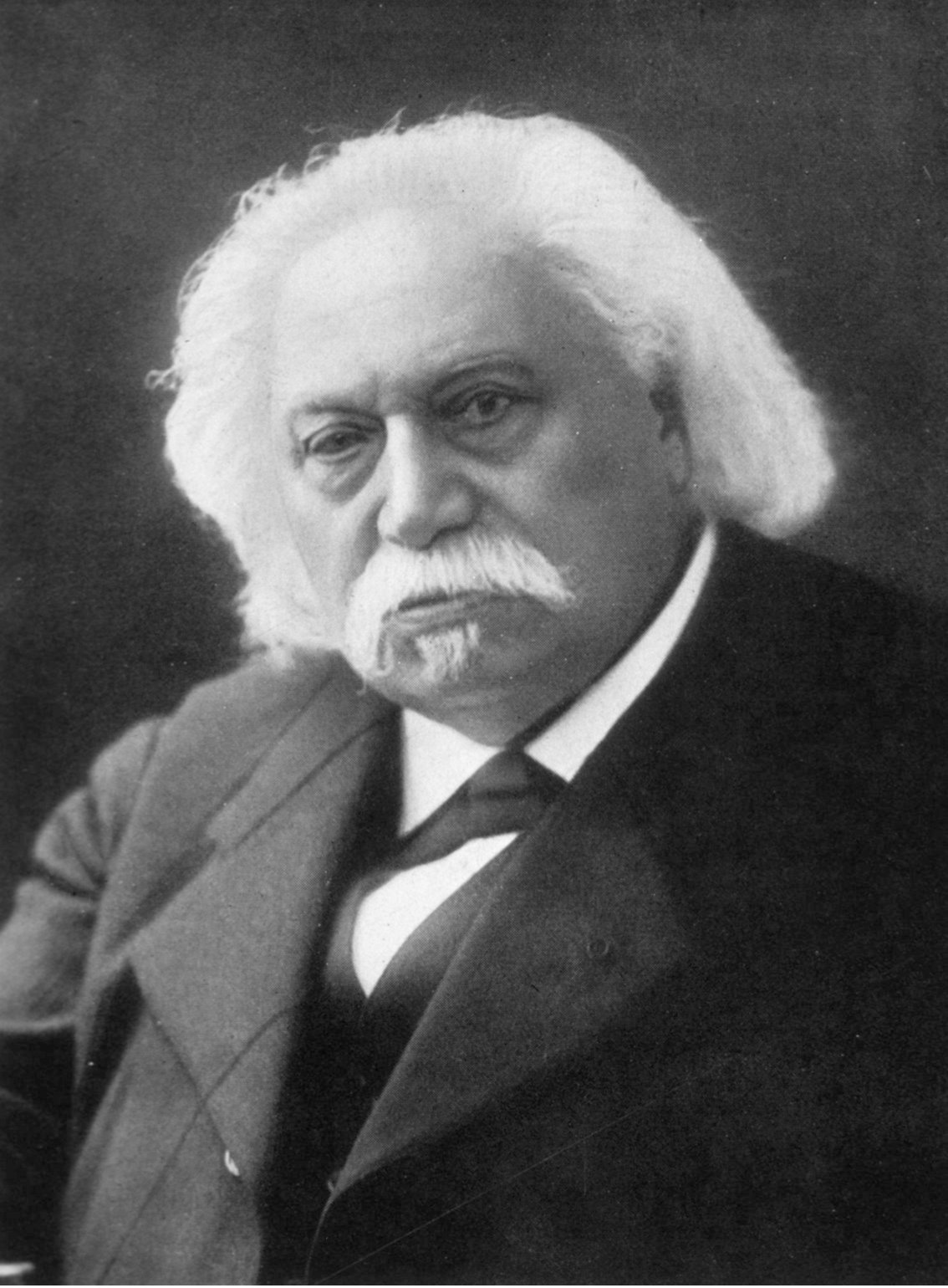
Auguste Chauveau

Jean-Baptiste "Auguste" Chauveau ForMemRS (French pronunciation: [ʒɑ̃ batist oɡyst ʃovo]; 23 November 1827 – 4 January 1917) was a French professor of physiology and veterinarian. He contributed to the development of techniques in cardiac catheterization.

== Life ==
Born in Villeneuve-la-Guyard, the son of a blacksmith, he received his education at the École nationale vétérinaire d'Alfort and the École Nationale Vétérinaire de Lyon. At the age of 21 he joined the staff at the latter institution, where in 1875 he became the school's director. In 1886, he was appointed professor of comparative pathology at the Muséum national d'histoire naturelle in Paris.

Throughout his career Chauveau conducted investigations in the fields of microbiology, virology, biochemistry, muscle thermodynamics and cardiology. With Étienne-Jules Marey (1830–1904), he performed important studies involving the different phases of the cardiac cycle and intracardiac pressure.

In 1867 he made decisive experiments on the transmission of tuberculosis and his work affected public health regulations. He had a role in the invention of cardiac catheterization.

He attracted the ire of a number of anti-vivisection writers for his experiments on animals at the turn of the twentieth century.

The bacterial species Clostridium chauvoei is named after him.

He was the author of Traité d'anatomie comparée des animaux domestiques, a work that was published in English as The comparative anatomy of the domesticated animals. Also, he collaborated with Charles-Joseph Bouchard (1837–1915) in the founding of the Journal de Physiologie et de Pathologie Générale.

== Works ==
- Auguste Chauveau; Saturnin Arloing (1873). The comparative anatomy of the domesticated animals. translator George Fleming (2nd ed.). D. Appleton and company.
