= Bois-Jérôme-Saint-Ouen =

- Commune
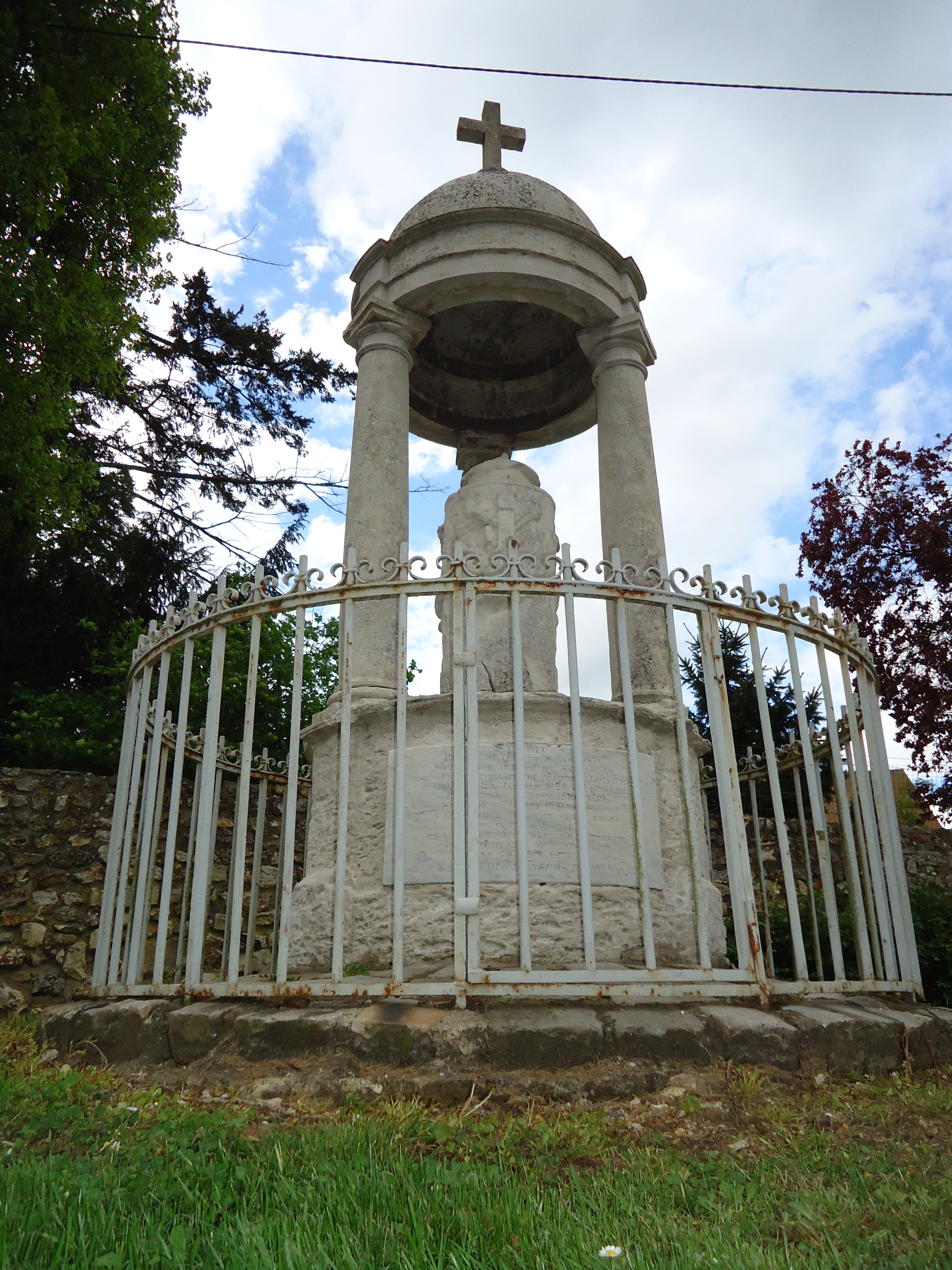
- The Pierre Seyer monument in Bois-Jérome-Saint-Ouen

- Coat of arms
- Location of Bois-Jérôme-Saint-Ouen
- Location within France Location within Normandy
- Coordinates: 49°06′22″N 1°32′05″E
- Country: France
- Region: Normandy
- Department: Eure
- Arrondissement: Les Andelys
- Canton: Les Andelys
- Intercommunality: Seine Normandie Agglomération

Government
  - Mayor (2020–2026): Jean-François Wielgus
- Area^{1}: 10.51 km^{2} (4.06 sq mi)
- Elevation: 143 m (469 ft)
- Highest elevation: 154 m (505 ft)
- Lowest elevation: 90 m (300 ft)
- Population (2023): 741
  - Density: 70.5/km^{2} (183/sq mi)
- Time zone: UTC+01:00 (CET)
  - Summer (DST): UTC+02:00 (CEST)
- INSEE/Postal code: 27072 /27620
- ^{1} French Land Register data, which excludes lakes, ponds, glaciers > 1 km^{2} (0.386 sq mi or 247 acres) and river estuaries.

Bois-Jérôme-Saint-Ouen (French pronunciation: [bwa ʒeʁom sɛ̃.t‿wɛ̃]) is a commune in the Eure department in Normandy in north-western France.

== Population ==
Historical population
Year	Pop.	±% p.a.
1968	369	—
1975	387	+0.68%
1982	452	+2.24%
1990	634	+4.32%
1999	677	+0.73%
2007	738	+1.08%
2012	758	+0.54%
2017	749	−0.24%
2023	741	−0.18%
Source: INSEE

== See also ==
- Communes of the Eure department
