= Clostridium haemolyticum =

Scientific classification
- Domain: Bacteria
- Kingdom: Bacillati
- Phylum: Bacillota
- Class: Clostridia
- Order: Eubacteriales
- Family: Clostridiaceae
- Genus: Clostridium
- Species: C. haemolyticum

Binomial name
- Clostridium haemolyticum Clostridium hemolyticum (Hall 1929) Scott et al. 1935

Synonyms
- Clostridium hemolyticum

Species of bacterium

Clostridium haemolyticum is a species anaerobic, gram-positive bacteria in the family of Clostridiaceae.

Based on 16S-rDNA sequence analysis, C. haemolyticum is closely related to C. novyi and C. botulinum. While C. haemolyticum has been suggested to be identical to C. novyi before, it is considered a valid species as of 2022.

This species is known to cause bacilliary hemoglobinuria in cattle.

This species is a rare cause of infections in humans. A case of bacteremia with significant intravascular hemolysis due to C. haemolyticum was reported in 2021.
