= Clostridium novyi =

Scientific classification
- Domain: Bacteria
- Kingdom: Bacillati
- Phylum: Bacillota
- Class: Clostridia
- Order: Eubacteriales
- Family: Clostridiaceae
- Genus: Clostridium
- Species: C. novyi

Binomial name
- Clostridium novyi (Migula 1894 [sic]) Bergey et al. 1923

Species of bacterium

Clostridium novyi (oedematiens) a Gram-positive, endospore- forming, obligate anaerobic bacteria of the class Clostridia. It is ubiquitous, being found in the soil and faeces. It is pathogenic, causing a wide variety of diseases in humans and animals.

Growth in culture proceeds through 3 stages: Initial growth wherein no toxin is produced; vigorous growth wherein toxin is produced; and spore formation wherein endospores are formed and toxin production decreases. It is suggested that type C may be type B that forms spores more readily so does not go through the toxin-production stage.

Isolating and identifying C novyi is difficult due to its extreme anaerobic nature. Commercial kits may not be adequate.

It is also fastidious and difficult to culture, requiring the presence of thiols.

== Taxonomy ==
Clostridium novyi is considered to be made up from three clades, labelled A, B and C, distinguished by the range of toxins they produce. While strains of type C were not linked to disease to laboratory animals, presence and activity of toxins in C. novyi have been linked to infection with Bacteriophages.

Based on toxin production, Clostridium haemolyticum has been suggested to be considered a part of C. novyi, forming a separate type D in the genus. More recent 16S-rDNA studies however have suggested, that C. haemolyticus and types B and C of C. novyi may form a distinct species, closely related to Clostridium botulinum type C and D ("group III"), instead.

== Toxins ==
The toxins are designated by Greek letters. The designation only applies to C. novyi and not to other Clostridium species. A complex mapping exists between the names for homologous versions of toxins.

Toxins normally produced by the various types of C. novyi
Toxin	A	B	C	C. hemolyticum ("D")	Description
alpha	Yes	Yes	No	No	clostridial glucosylating toxin TcdA, a N-acetylglucosaminyltransferase
beta	No	Yes	No	Yes	phospholipase C?
gamma	Yes	No	Yes	No	phospholipase C, except non-lethal?
delta	Yes	No	No	No	"oxygen labile hemolysin"
epsilon	Yes	No	No	No	"lipase"
zeta	No	Yes	No	No	"hemolysin"
eta	No	Yes	No	No	"tropomyosinase"
theta	No	Trace	No	Yes	"breaks egg yolk lecithin"

=== Alpha-toxin ===
The alpha-toxin (TcdA, Q46149) is characterised as lethal and necrotizing. The type A alpha-toxin is oedematising.

It acts by causing morphological changes to all cell types especially endothelial cells by inhibition of signal transduction pathways, resulting in the breakdown of cytoskeletal structures. The cells of the microvascular system become spherical and the attachments to neighbouring cells are reduced to thin strings. This results in leakage from the capillaries, leading to oedema. The threshold concentration for this action to occur is 5 ng/ml (5 parts per billion) with 50% of cells rounded at 50 ng/ml.

The duodenum is particularly sensitive to the toxin. Injection into dogs resulted in extreme oedema of the submucosal tissues of the duodenum while leaving the stomach uninjured. Injection into the eye resulted in lesions similar to flame haemorrhages found in diabetic retinopathy.

The toxin is a large 250-kDa protein the active part of which is the NH_{2}-terminal 551 amino acid fragment. Alpha-toxins are glycosyltransferases, modifying and thereby inactivating different members of the Rho and Ras subfamily of small GTP-binding proteins. C novyi type A alpha-toxin is unique in using UDP-N-acetylglucosamine rather than UDP-glucose as a substrate.

==== Family ====
TcdA is an example of a clostridial glucosylating toxin. The A and B toxins of Clostridioides difficile show homology with the alpha-toxin of C novyi as does the lethal toxin of clostridium sordellii.

=== Beta-toxin ===
The beta-toxin is characterised as haemolytic, necrotizing lecithinase. It is a phospholipase C.

The "alpha-toxin" of Clostridium botulinum types C and D is similar to the C novyi beta-toxin.

=== Gamma-toxin ===
The gamma-toxin is characterised as haemolytic, lecithinase.

=== Delta-toxin ===
The delta-toxin is characterised as oxygen labile haemolysin.

=== Epsilon-toxin ===
The epsilon-toxin is characterised as lecithino-vitelin and thought to be responsible for the pearly layer found in cultures.

=== Zeta-toxin ===
The zeta-toxin is characterised as haemolysin.

== Human diseases ==
The type and severity of the disease caused depends on penetration of the tissues. The epithelium of the alimentary tract, in general, provides an effective barrier to penetration. However, spores may escape from the gut and lodge in any part of the body and result in spontaneous infection should local anaerobic conditions occur.

=== Tissue penetration ===
Wound infection by C novyi and many other clostridium species cause gas gangrene. Spontaneous infection is mostly associated with predisposing factors of hematologic or colorectal malignancies and with diabetes mellitus, although Gram-negative organisms, including Escherichia coli, may lead to a gas gangrene-like syndrome in diabetic patients. This presents with cellulitis and crepitus, and may be mistaken for gas gangrene. Spontaneous, nontraumatic, or intrinsic infections from a bowel source have been increasingly reported recently.

Clostridium novyi has been implicated in mortality among injecting illegal drug users.

=== Epithelial infections ===
Symptoms are often non-specific including, colitis, oedematous duodenitis, and fever with somnolence.

Testing is problematical with figures presented by McLauchlin and Brazier [cited above] suggesting a false negative rate of about 40% under ideal conditions. Only positive results may be regarded as reliable. In the absence of a positive test, C. novyi type A may be inferred from characterisation by clinical observation, table 2.

Table 2	
Observation	Comment
Oedema	Especially if extreme with rapid onset. In view of the sensitivity of the duodenum to the alpha-toxin, oedematous duodenum is always suspect.
Anaerobic	Infection occurs at an anaerobic site such as the gut or salivary gland. It may also occur at a site temporarily made anaerobic by occlusion and maintained in this state by oedema.
Gram positive	If penicillin causes remission of oedema then a Gram positive organism is the causative agent.

Chronic infection leading to leaky capillaries may also cause retinal haemorrhages and oedema in the lower extremities leading to necrosis and gangrene. Leaky nephrons may compromise the ability of kidneys to concentrate urine leading to frequent urination and dehydration.

== Animal diseases ==
Gas gangrene: infectious necrotic hepatitis (black disease)

== See also ==
- Clostridium novyi-NT, an attenuated form being studied for its potential use as a cancer treatment
