= Anaerostipes hadrus =

Scientific classification
- Domain: Bacteria
- Kingdom: Bacillati
- Phylum: Bacillota
- Class: Clostridia
- Order: Eubacteriales
- Family: Lachnospiraceae
- Genus: Anaerostipes
- Species: A. hadrus

Binomial name
- Anaerostipes hadrus (Moore et al. 1976) Allen-Vercoe et al. 2013

Type strain
- ATCC 29173 T, B2-52 T, DSM 3319 T, JCM 9980 T, STAFF 1024 T, VP 82-52 T, VPI B2-52

Synonyms
- Anaerostipes coli Eubacterium hadrum

Species of bacterium

Anaerostipes hadrus is a butyrate-producing Gram-positive bacterium from the genus Anaerostipes which has been isolated from human faeces.

A. hadrus was previously known as Eubacterium hadrum but was renamed based on phylogenetic analysis, which confirmed sequence similarity between the bacterium and members of the genus Anaerostipes.
