= Butyrivibrio proteoclasticus =

Scientific classification
- Domain: Bacteria
- Kingdom: Bacillati
- Phylum: Bacillota
- Class: Clostridia
- Order: Lachnospirales
- Family: Lachnospiraceae
- Genus: Butyrivibrio
- Species: B. proteoclasticus

Binomial name
- Butyrivibrio proteoclasticus (Attwood et al. 1996) Moon et al. 2008

Synonyms
- Clostridium proteoclasticum Attwood et al. 1996

Species of bacterium

Butyrivibrio proteoclasticus is a bacterium from the family Lachnospiraceae originally described in the genus Clostridium.

== Butyrivibrio proteoclasticus B316^{T} ==
Butyrivibrio proteoclasticus B316^{T} was the first Butyrivibrio species to have its genome sequenced. It was first isolated and described by Attwood et al. (1996), and was originally assigned to the genus Clostridium based on its similarity to Clostridium aminophilum, a member of the Clostridium sub-cluster XIVa. Further analysis has shown that it is more appropriately placed within the genus Butyrivibrio and the organism was given its current name. Within this genus its 16S rDNA sequence is most similar to, but distinct from, that of B. hungatei.

B. proteoclasticus is found in rumen contents at significant concentrations of from 2.01 million/mL to 31.2 million/mL as estimated by competitive PCR or 2.2% to 9.4% of the total eubacterial DNA within the rumen, as estimated by real time PCR. B. proteoclasticus cells are anaerobic, slightly curved rods, commonly found singly or in short chains, but it is not unusual for them to form long chains. They possess a single sub-terminal flagellum, but unlike other Butyrivibrio species, they are not motile. They are ultrastructurally Gram-positive, although as with all Butyrivibrio species, they stain Gram-negative

B. proteoclasticus has been shown to have an important role in biohydrogenation, converting linoleic acid to stearic acid.
