= Blautia massiliensis =

Scientific classification
- Domain: Bacteria
- Kingdom: Bacillati
- Phylum: Bacillota
- Class: Clostridia
- Order: Eubacteriales
- Family: Lachnospiraceae
- Genus: Blautia
- Species: B. massiliensis

Binomial name
- Blautia massiliensis

Species of bacterium

Blautia massiliensis is an anoxic, Gram-negative rod shaped bacterium first isolated from human feces in 2017. Cells are non-motile and non-spore forming. Notably, this species is a Gram-negative member of the mainly Gram-positive genus Blautia. The type strain for this species is GD9T.
