= Cellulosilyticum lentocellum =

Scientific classification
- Domain: Bacteria
- Kingdom: Bacillati
- Phylum: Bacillota
- Class: Clostridia
- Order: Eubacteriales
- Family: Lachnospiraceae
- Genus: Cellulosilyticum
- Species: C. lentocellum

Binomial name
- Cellulosilyticum lentocellum (Murray et al. 1987) Cai and Dong 2010

Type strain
- ATCC 49066, DSM 5427, NCIB 11756, NCIMB 11756, RHM5

Synonyms
- Clostridium lentocellum

Species of bacterium

Cellulosilyticum lentocellum is an anaerobic and spore-forming bacterium from the genus Cellulosilyticum, which has been isolated from sediments from the River Don in Scotland. C. lentocellum produces cellobiose 2-epimerase.
