= Enterocloster aldenensis =

Scientific classification
- Domain: Bacteria
- Kingdom: Bacillati
- Phylum: Bacillota
- Class: Clostridia
- Order: Lachnospirales
- Family: Lachnospiraceae
- Genus: Enterocloster
- Species: E. aldenensis

Binomial name
- Enterocloster aldenensis (Warren et al. 2007) Haas and Blanchard. 2020

Type strain
- RMA 9741 (ATCC BAA-1318, CCUG 52204, DSM 19262)

Synonyms
- Clostridium aldenense Warren et al. 2007; Enterocloster aldensis

Species of bacterium

Enterocloster aldensis, formerly Clostridium aldenense, is a bacterium in the genus Enterocloster. The type species was isolated from clinical infections in California in the United States along E. citroniae and placed in the genus Clostridium. Together with other gram-negative species, it was moved to the new genus Enterocloster in 2020. The name pertains to R. M. Alden Research Laboratory and its first patron, Rose M. Alden Goldstein.
