= Blautia faecis =

Scientific classification
- Domain: Bacteria
- Kingdom: Bacillati
- Phylum: Bacillota
- Class: Clostridia
- Order: Eubacteriales
- Family: Lachnospiraceae
- Genus: Blautia
- Species: B. faecis

Binomial name
- Blautia faecis Park et al. 2013

Species of bacterium

Blautia faecis is a species of anoxic, Gram-positive, non-motile bacteria first isolated from human faeces. B. faecis is both catalase and oxidase negative and utilizes carbohydrates as fermentable substances, producing lactate and acetate as the major end products of fermentation. The type strain is M25T ( = KCTC 5980T = JCM 17205T).

Some strains of B. faecis have shown promise as potentially beneficial to mice infected with influenza, particularly to protect mice from post-influenza Streptococcus and Salmonella infections.

Administration of B. faecis has been linked to cognitive impairment in trials with mice.
