= Roseburia hominis =

Scientific classification
- Domain: Bacteria
- Kingdom: Bacillati
- Phylum: Bacillota
- Class: Clostridia
- Order: Lachnospirales
- Family: Lachnospiraceae
- Genus: Roseburia
- Species: R. hominis

Binomial name
- Roseburia hominis Duncan et al. 2006

Species of bacterium

Roseburia hominis is a bacterium first isolated from human feces. It is anaerobic, Gram-negative or Gram-variable, slightly curved rod-shaped and motile. The cells range in size from 0.5-1.5 to 5.0 μm. A2-183(T) (=DSM 16839(T)=NCIMB 14029(T)) is the type strain.

It is being studied as a potential treatment for ulcerative colitis in pediatric patients ages 0 through 16 years.
