= Oribacterium sinus =

Scientific classification
- Domain: Bacteria
- Kingdom: Bacillati
- Phylum: Bacillota
- Class: Clostridia
- Order: Eubacteriales
- Family: Lachnospiraceae
- Genus: Oribacterium
- Species: O. sinus

Binomial name
- Oribacterium sinus Carlier et al. 2004

Type strain
- CCUG 48084, CIP 107991, AIP 354.02

Species of bacterium

Oribacterium sinus is an anaerobic bacterium from the genus of Oribacterium which has been isolated from the maxillary sinus of a human in Nancy in France.
