= Lacrimispora =

Scientific classification
- Domain: Bacteria
- Kingdom: Bacillati
- Phylum: Bacillota
- Class: Clostridia
- Order: Eubacteriales
- Family: Lachnospiraceae
- Genus: Lacrimispora; Haas and Blanchard 2020

Type species
- Lacrimispora sphenoides (Douglas et al. 1919) Haas & Blanchard 2020

Species
- See text

Synonyms
- "Douglasillus" Heller 1922

Genus of bacteria

Lacrimispora is a genus of bacteria in the family Lachnospiraceae.

== Phylogeny ==
The currently accepted taxonomy is based on the List of Prokaryotic names with Standing in Nomenclature (LPSN) and National Center for Biotechnology Information (NCBI).

16S rRNA based LTP_10_2024

- Lacrimispora
  - - L. algidixylanolytica (Broda et al. 2000) Haas & Blanchard 2020
    - - L. xylanisolvens Heng & Kittelmann 2024
        [Hungatella xylanolytica (Scholten-Koerselman et al. 1988) García-López et al. 2020]
      - - L. aerotolerans (van Gylswyk & van der Toorn 1987) Haas & Blanchard 2020
        - L. xylanolytica (Rogers & Baecker 1991) Haas & Blanchard 2020
          non (Scholten-Koerselman et al. 1988) Urvashi et al. 2022
  - - - L. amygdalina (Parshina et al. 2003) Haas & Blanchard 2020
      - "L. indica" (Gundawar et al. 2019) Urvashi et al. 2022
    - - L. saccharolytica (Murray, Khan & Van den Berg 1982) Haas & Blanchard 2020
      - - - L. indolis (McClung & McCoy 1957) Haas & Blanchard 2020
          - Clostridium methoxybenzovorans Mechichi et al. 1999
        - - L. celerecrescens (Palop et al. 1989) Haas & Blanchard 2020
          - L. sphenoides (Douglas et al. 1919) Haas & Blanchard 2020

120 marker proteins based GTDB 09-RS220

- Lacrimispora
  - - L. algidixylanolytica
    - - L. aerotolerans
      - L. xylanolytica
  - - - "L. indica"
      - - L. amygdalina
        - "L. defluvii" Urvashi et al. 2022
    - - - L. indolis [incl. Clostridium methoxybenzovorans]
        - L. saccharolytica
      - - L. celerecrescens
        - L. sphenoides

== See also ==
- List of bacterial orders
- List of bacteria genera
