= Mediterraneibacter faecis =

Scientific classification
- Domain: Bacteria
- Kingdom: Bacillati
- Phylum: Bacillota
- Class: Clostridia
- Order: Eubacteriales
- Family: Lachnospiraceae
- Genus: Mediterraneibacter
- Species: M. faecis

Binomial name
- Mediterraneibacter faecis (Kim et al. 2011) Togo et al. 2019

Synonyms
- Ruminococcus faecis Kim et al. 2011

Species of bacterium

Mediterraneibacter faecis (also Ruminococcus faecis) is an anaerobic, Gram-positive, non-motile, and non-spore-forming species of bacteria, originally isolated from the faeces of a healthy 26-year-old male during a study on the diversity of cultivable intestinal microbiota of Koreans.

The cells of M. faecis have a coccoid or oval shape and are generally observed in chains. Their optimal growth temperature is 37 °C and cells are oxidase-negative and catalase-positive.
