= Oliverpabstia intestinalis =

Scientific classification
- Domain: Bacteria
- Kingdom: Bacillati
- Phylum: Bacillota
- Class: Clostridia
- Order: Eubacteriales
- Family: Lachnospiraceae
- Genus: Oliverpabstia
- Species: O. intestinalis

Binomial name
- Oliverpabstia intestinalis Wylensek et al., 2021

Type strain
- BSM-380-WT-5A (= DSM 106162 = JCM 34394)

Species of bacterium

Oliverpabstia intestinalis is a species of Gram-positive, strictly anaerobic bacteria within the family Lachnospiraceae. It is the type species of the genus Oliverpabstia, first described in 2020 following its isolation from the gastrointestinal tract of pigs in Germany. The species name "intestinalis" reflects its origin from the intestinal environment.

== Taxonomy ==
Oliverpabstia intestinalis was first described by Wylensek et al. in 2020, based on isolates obtained from the pig gastrointestinal tract. Phylogenetic analyses, including 16S rRNA gene sequencing and whole-genome comparisons, demonstrated that these isolates formed a distinct lineage within the Lachnospiraceae family, warranting the establishment of a new genus and species.

== Morphology and physiology ==
Members of the species O. intestinalis are characterized by the following features:

- Cell morphology: Gram-positive, non-spore-forming coccoid rods
- Oxygen requirement: Strictly anaerobic
- Temperature range: Mesophilic, with optimal growth at 37 °C
- Metabolism: Fermentative, producing short-chain fatty acids as metabolic end products

The type strain, BSM-380-WT-5A, was isolated from the feces of a 5-month-old pig in Germany.

== Ecology ==
Oliverpabstia intestinalis has been isolated from the gastrointestinal tracts of pigs and humans, and macaques suggesting a role in the gut microbiota of mammals. Specifically, strain DSM 113008 (JCM 35882) was isolated from the feces of a healthy adult male in Aachen, Germany, in 2020.

In a study conducted in 2024 with 3,234 faecal samples from humans in rural China, a positive correlation was found between O. intestinalis and the frequency of defecation, but that O. intestinalis did not cause symptoms of diarrhoea or infection.

== Parkinson's disease ==
There has been research to suggest a reduced risk of Parkinson's disease due to coffee intake, but whether this is due to changes in gut microbiome or metabolism is not yet known. A 2025 study investigated this and found that O. intestinalis was one of 56 microbes that were enriched with patients with Parkinson's disease and negatively correlated with caffeine and its metabolites.

== Pig farming ==
O. intestinalis was found to increase in abundance (alongside 140 other microbes) in the guts of pigs after weaning. Metagemonic-assembled genomes (MAG's) are sequences from reconstructed genomes in a laboratory, and are used to help identify and record genomic data where the microbe itself may not be able to be directly cultured from the environment. MAG's of O. intestinalis was also used as a predictor of resilience to post weaning diarrhoea in piglets.

== Prebiotics ==
Prebiotics are used to alter the gut biome for health benefits. For conditions like Irritable Bowel Syndrome (IBS), there have been investigations into more convenient or effective methods of prebiotic delivery. In a 2025 study, a technology that allows host faecal microbiome (SIFR®) was used to create Bimuno® Galacto-oligosaccaride (GOS). 8 humans were tested in the trial, where capsules of GOS were ingested and these prebiotics were able to modify the human gut biome, including the increase of O. intestinalis.

== See also ==
- Lachnospiraceae
- Gut microbiota
