= Enterocloster bolteae =

Scientific classification
- Domain: Bacteria
- Kingdom: Bacillati
- Phylum: Bacillota
- Class: Clostridia
- Order: Lachnospirales
- Family: Lachnospiraceae
- Genus: Enterocloster
- Species: E. bolteae

Binomial name
- Enterocloster bolteae (Song et al. 2003) Haas and Blanchard 2020

Type strain
- WAL 16351^{T} (ATCC BAA-613^{T}, CCUG 46953^{T}, DSM 15670, JCM 12243, CIP 109439, VTT E-052776

Synonyms
- Clostridium bolteae Song et al. 2003; Clostridium boltei; Lachnoclostridium bolteae (not validly published)

Species of bacterium

Enterocloster bolteae, formerly Clostridium bolteae, is a gram-positive, rod-shaped bacterium from the genus Enterocloster. E. bolteae is obligately anaerobic and capable of forming spores. The type species was isolated from a human stool sample.
