= Anaerostipes butyraticus =

Scientific classification
- Domain: Bacteria
- Kingdom: Bacillati
- Phylum: Bacillota
- Class: Clostridia
- Order: Eubacteriales
- Family: Lachnospiraceae
- Genus: Anaerostipes
- Species: A. butyraticus

Binomial name
- Anaerostipes butyraticus Eeckhaut et al. 2010

Type strain
- 35-7, DSM 22094, Eeckhaut 35-7, JCM 17466, KCTC 15125, LMG 24724

Species of bacterium

Anaerostipes butyraticus is a Gram-positive, butyrate-producing and anaerobic bacterium from the genus Anaerostipes which has been isolated from the caecal content of a broiler chicken in Ghent in Belgium.
