= Blautia producta =

Scientific classification
- Domain: Bacteria
- Kingdom: Bacillati
- Phylum: Bacillota
- Class: Clostridia
- Order: Eubacteriales
- Family: Lachnospiraceae
- Genus: Blautia
- Species: B. producta

Binomial name
- Blautia producta (Prévot 1941) Liu et al. 2008 Kaneuchi et al. 1976, Liu et al. 2008

Synonyms
- Blautia coccoides; Clostridium coccoides

Species of bacterium

Blautia producta (also known as Blautia coccoides) (Note: As the very close genetic similarity of B. coccoides and B. producta (sequence similarity of 99.65%) was only recognised in 2025, and properties of the species may be strain specific, the current separate large literature under the different names may need to be reinterpreted.) is an anaerobic and gram-positive bacteria that lives in the human intestine and may influence some human diseases. Negative correlations have been reported for type 2 diabetes mellitus and hypercholesterolemia so strains have been examined as potential probiotics.

== Animal studies ==
A strain is being studied to enhance production in chicken farming as it increases poultry weight and improves meat quality.

== Human studies ==
A recent review of B. producta, as a potential immunomodulator probiotic, did not include studies done on B. coccoides.

Studies of gut microbiota have found that human large intestine production of mucus is facilitated by secretion of short-chain fatty acids from the organism in the colon. This is potentially important as a poor mucus layer in the colon is associated with serveral human diseases.

The manipulation of the gut microbiota by say leucine deprivation which stimulates the growth of strains of the organism compared to other gut bacteria may benefit certain metabolic disorders such as obesity and type 2 diabetes mellitus associated with diet.

The production of trimethylamine N-oxide in the gut by the organism is a potential causative factor for Alzheimer's disease progression.
