= Oribacterium asaccharolyticum =

Scientific classification
- Domain: Bacteria
- Kingdom: Bacillati
- Phylum: Bacillota
- Class: Clostridia
- Order: Eubacteriales
- Family: Lachnospiraceae
- Genus: Oribacterium
- Species: O. asaccharolyticum

Binomial name
- Oribacterium asaccharolyticum Sizova et al. 2014

Type strain
- ACB7, ATCC BAA-2639, DSM 24638, HM-482

Species of bacterium

Oribacterium asaccharolyticum is a Gram-positive, strictly anaerobic, non-spore-forming, rod-shaped and motile bacterium from the genus of Oribacterium which has been isolated from the human subgingival dental plaque from a patient in Boston in the United States.
