= Lacrimispora celerecrescens =

Scientific classification
- Domain: Bacteria
- Kingdom: Bacillati
- Phylum: Bacillota
- Class: Clostridia
- Order: Lachnospirales
- Family: Lachnospiraceae
- Genus: Lacrimispora
- Species: L. celerecrescens

Binomial name
- Lacrimispora celerecrescens (Palop et al. 1989) Haas and Blanchard 2020

Type strain
- 18A, ATCC 49205, CECT 954, CET 954, DSM 5628, DSMZ 5628, KCTC 5120, NCAIM B.02001, NCIMB 12829

Synonyms
- Clostridium celericrescens; Clostridium celerecrescens

Species of bacterium

Lacrimispora celerecrescens is a bacterium from the genus Lacrimispora.
