= Dorea longicatena =

Scientific classification
- Domain: Bacteria
- Kingdom: Bacillati
- Phylum: Bacillota
- Class: Clostridia
- Order: Eubacteriales
- Family: Lachnospiraceae
- Genus: Dorea
- Species: D. longicatena

Binomial name
- Dorea longicatena Taras et al. 2002

Type strain
- CCUG 45247, DSM 13814, III-35, JCM 11232

Species of bacterium

Dorea longicatena is a Gram-positive, obligately anaerobic, non-spore-forming and rod-shaped bacterium from the genus Dorea which has been isolated from human feces in Germany.

D. longicatena has been linked to obesity factors, such as high body mass index (BMI), low high density lipoprotein (HDL) Cholesterol and fatty livers, in a study that was looking into these factors in relation to breast cancer.

D. longicatena is known to be associated with the altered gut microbiome in patients with dystonia, a complex neurological movement disorder, where there is a higher enrichment of this bacteria.
