= Lachnoanaerobaculum saburreum =

Scientific classification
- Domain: Bacteria
- Kingdom: Bacillati
- Phylum: Bacillota
- Class: Clostridia
- Order: Eubacteriales
- Family: Lachnospiraceae
- Genus: Lachnoanaerobaculum
- Species: L. saburreum

Binomial name
- Lachnoanaerobaculum saburreum (Prévot 1966) Hedberg et al. 2012

Type strain
- AIP 10202, ATCC 33271, CCUG 28089, CIP 105341, DSM 3986, JCM 11021, T2, VPI 11763

Synonyms
- Catenabacterium saburreum Leptotrichia aerogenes Eubacterium saburreum

Species of bacterium

Lachnoanaerobaculum saburreum is a bacterium from the genus Lachnoanaerobaculum which has been isolated from human dental plaque.
