= Cellulosilyticum ruminicola =

Scientific classification
- Domain: Bacteria
- Kingdom: Bacillati
- Phylum: Bacillota
- Class: Clostridia
- Order: Eubacteriales
- Family: Lachnospiraceae
- Genus: Cellulosilyticum
- Species: C. ruminicola

Binomial name
- Cellulosilyticum ruminicola Cai and Dong 2010

Type strain
- CGMCC 1.5065, H1, JCM 14822

Species of bacterium

Cellulosilyticum ruminicola is a Gram-negative, obligate anaerobic, mesophilic, cellulolytic and non-motile bacterium from the genus Cellulosilyticum which has been isolated from the rumen of a yak.
