= Faecalicatena fissicatena =

Scientific classification
- Domain: Bacteria
- Kingdom: Bacillati
- Phylum: Bacillota
- Class: Clostridia
- Order: Eubacteriales
- Family: Lachnospiraceae
- Genus: Faecalicatena
- Species: F. fissicatena

Binomial name
- Faecalicatena fissicatena (Taylor 1972) Sakamoto et al. 2017

Anaerobic bacterium

Faecalicatena fissicatena is a anaerobic, Gram-positive, rod-shaped bacterium which is part of the human gut microbiome. It is non-motile and catalase-negative. Cells are approximately 0.3-0.5μm in width and 0.5-1.0μm in length. It was previously known as Eubacterium fissicatena but was reclassified in 2017.
