= Lacrimispora aerotolerans =

Scientific classification
- Domain: Bacteria
- Kingdom: Bacillati
- Phylum: Bacillota
- Class: Clostridia
- Order: Lachnospirales
- Family: Lachnospiraceae
- Genus: Lacrimispora
- Species: L. aerotolerans

Binomial name
- Lacrimispora aerotolerans (van Gylswyk and van der Toorn 1987) Haas and Blanchard 2020

Synonyms
- Clostridium aerotolerans van Gylswyk and van der Toorn 1987; emend. Chamkha et al. 2001

Species of bacterium

Lacrimispora aerotolerans is an anaerobic, motile, gram-positive bacterium.

Lacrimispora aerotolerans is xylanolytic, which means that these bacteria can digest the polysaccharides collectively known as xylan. Among this species' products are formic acid, acetic acid, lactic acids, ethanol, carbon dioxide, and hydrogen.
