= Pseudobutyrivibrio =

Scientific classification
- Domain: Bacteria
- Kingdom: Bacillati
- Phylum: Bacillota
- Class: Clostridia
- Order: Eubacteriales
- Family: Lachnospiraceae
- Genus: Pseudobutyrivibrio van Gylswyk et al. 1996

Type species
- Pseudobutyrivibrio ruminis van Gylswyk, Hippe & Rainey 1996

Species
- P. ruminis; P. xylanivorans

Genus of bacteria

Pseudobutyrivibrio is a Gram-negative, anaerobic and non-spore-forming bacterial genus from the family of Lachnospiraceae.

Pseudobutyrivibrio as Gram-negative, is in contrast to Butyrivibrio, which is Gram-positive, as is typical of most Bacillota phylum bacteria.

== Phylogeny ==
The currently accepted taxonomy is based on the List of Prokaryotic names with Standing in Nomenclature (LPSN) and National Center for Biotechnology Information (NCBI)

16S rRNA based LTP_10_2024

- Pseudobutyrivibrio
  - P. ruminis van Gylswyk, Hippe & Rainey 1996
  - P. xylanivorans Kopecny et al. 2003

120 marker proteins based GTDB 09-RS220

- Pseudobutyrivibrio
  - P. ruminis
  - P. xylanivorans

== See also ==
- List of bacterial orders
- List of bacteria genera
