= Blautia wexlerae =

Scientific classification
- Domain: Bacteria
- Kingdom: Bacillati
- Phylum: Bacillota
- Class: Clostridia
- Order: Eubacteriales
- Family: Lachnospiraceae
- Genus: Blautia
- Species: B. wexlerae

Binomial name
- Blautia wexlerae Liu et al. 2008

Species of bacterium

Blautia wexlerae is an anaerobic and gram-positive bacteria that lives in the human intestine.

Studies of gut microbiota have found indications that higher levels of B. wexlerae may decrease obesity in mice and humans. B. wexlerae produces acetylcholine and carbohydrate metabolites (ex. succinate, lactate, acetate). These may modify the gut environment, including the bacterial and SCFA composition of the gut microbiota. Thus, B. wexlerae may offer various, numerous, and diverse benefits for health maintenance.

B. wexlerae has also shown to be positively associated with children with higher cognitive function scores.
