= Lacrimispora amygdalina =

Scientific classification
- Domain: Bacteria
- Kingdom: Bacillati
- Phylum: Bacillota
- Class: Clostridia
- Order: Lachnospirales
- Family: Lachnospiraceae
- Genus: Lacrimispora
- Species: L. amygdalina

Binomial name
- Lacrimispora amygdalina (Parshina et al. 2003) Haas and Blanchard 2020

Type strain
- ATCC BAA-501, BR-10, DSM 12857

Synonyms
- Clostridium amygdalinum

Species of bacterium

Lacrimispora amygdalinum is a Gram-positive, anaerobic and rod-shaped bacterium from the genus Lacrimispora which has been isolated from sludge from a wastewater treatment plant in the Netherlands.
