= Agathobacter rectalis =

Scientific classification
- Domain: Bacteria
- Kingdom: Bacillati
- Phylum: Bacillota
- Class: Clostridia
- Order: Eubacteriales
- Family: Lachnospiraceae
- Genus: Agathobacter
- Species: A. rectalis

Binomial name
- Agathobacter rectalis Rosero et al. 2016

Type strain
- ATCC 33656

Synonyms
- Bacteroides rectalis, Pseudobacterium rectale, Roseburia rectale, Eubacterium rectale

Species of bacterium

Agathobacter rectalis is a gram-positive, butyrate-producing, anaerobic, rod-shaped and non-spore-forming bacterium from the genus Agathobacter. A. rectalis has a single flagellate and it occurs in the rumen content of sheep and cows, and in the gut microbiome of humans. It is suggested that Eubacterium rectale is a synonym of A. rectalis, although this is not universally accepted.

A 2021 study looked at 5,700 gut microbiome samples from humans of various ages around the world; fifty species were found in over 70% of the participants. Of those, A. rectalis was the most abundant species. The study noted that A. rectalis has a large diversity in sequence identity which may be a factor in why the studies found this to be the most abundant bacterium.

== Alzheimer's Disease ==
Patients with Alzheimer's disease can have a reduced abundance of short chain fatty acid producing bacteria, including A. rectalis: reduced numbers of A. rectalis in the gut may be a risk factor for Alzheimer's disease.

== Metabolic dysfunction-associated steatotic liver disease ==
A. rectalis was found to be depleted in the gut microbiome of people with metabolic dysfunction-associated steatotic liver disease (MASLD) and can be used as an indicator of MASLD severity.
