= Cellulosilyticum =

Scientific classification
- Domain: Bacteria
- Kingdom: Bacillati
- Phylum: Bacillota
- Class: Clostridia
- Order: Eubacteriales
- Family: Lachnospiraceae
- Genus: Cellulosilyticum; Cai and Dong 2010

Type species
- Cellulosilyticum ruminicola Cai & Dong 2010

Species
- C. lentocellum; "Ca. C. pullistercoris"; C. ruminicola

Genus of bacteria

Cellulosilyticum is a mesophilic bacterial genus from the family Lachnospiraceae.

== Phylogeny ==
The currently accepted taxonomy is based on the List of Prokaryotic names with Standing in Nomenclature (LPSN) and National Center for Biotechnology Information (NCBI)

16S rRNA based LTP_10_2024

- Cellulosilyticum
  - C. ruminicola
  - C. lentocellum

120 marker proteins based GTDB 09-RS220

- Cellulosilyticum
  - C. ruminicola Cai & Dong 2010
  - - C. lentocellum (Murray et al. 1987) Cai & Dong 2010
    - "Ca. C. pullistercoris" Gilroy et al. 2021
