= Claveliimonas bilis =

Scientific classification
- Domain: Bacteria
- Kingdom: Bacillati
- Phylum: Bacillota
- Class: Clostridia
- Order: Eubacteriales
- Family: Lachnospiraceae
- Genus: Claveliimonas
- Species: C. bilis

Binomial name
- Claveliimonas bilis Yura et al., 2023

Type strain
- 12BBH14T (=JCM 35899T =DSM 115701T)

Claveliimonas bilis is a newly described species of anaerobic, deoxycholic acid-producing bacteria belonging to the family Lachnospiraceae. First isolated from human feces in Japan and validly published in 2023, it also led to the reclassification of Sellimonas monacensis into this new genus as Claveliimonas monacensis.

== Description ==
Claveliimonas bilis is a newly discovered species of obligately anaerobic, Gram-stain-positive, rod-shaped bacteria. was first isolated from the fecal samples of healthy individuals in Japan. Discovered alongside strains 9CFEGH4 and 10CPCBH12, it forms a distinct monophyletic cluster that also encompasses the previously unclassified Eubacterium sp. c-25. Genomic analyses, including digital DNA–DNA hybridization and average nucleotide identity thresholds, confirmed its status as a new genus, which also prompted the reclassification of Sellimonas monacensis into this new genus as Claveliimonas monacensis
