= Hungatella =

Scientific classification
- Domain: Bacteria
- Kingdom: Bacillati
- Phylum: Bacillota
- Class: Clostridia
- Order: Eubacteriales
- Family: Lachnospiraceae
- Genus: Hungatella; Kaur et al. 2014

Type species
- H. effluvii Kaur et al. 2014

Species
- H. effluvii; H. hathewayi; H. hominis; "Ca. H. pullicola"; H. xylanolytica

Genus of bacteria

Hungatella is a bacterial genus from the family of Clostridiaceae.

== Phylogeny ==
The currently accepted taxonomy is based on the List of Prokaryotic names with Standing in Nomenclature (LPSN) and National Center for Biotechnology Information (NCBI)

16S rRNA based LTP_10_2024

- - - Hungatella
      - H. hathewayi (Steer et al. 2002) Kaur et al. 2014
      - - H. effluvii Kaur et al. 2014
        - H. hominis Liu et al. 2022
  - Lacrimispora [incl. Hungatella xylanolytica]

120 marker proteins based GTDB 09-RS220

- - "Ca. Hungatella pullicola" Gilroy et al. 2021
  - - - Hungatella
        - H. hathewayi
        - H. effluvii
    - Lacrimispora [incl. Hungatella xylanolytica]

== See also ==
- List of bacterial orders
- List of bacteria genera
