= Pseudobutyrivibrio xylanivorans =

Scientific classification
- Domain: Bacteria
- Kingdom: Bacillati
- Phylum: Bacillota
- Class: Clostridia
- Order: Eubacteriales
- Family: Lachnospiraceae
- Genus: Pseudobutyrivibrio
- Species: P. xylanivorans

Binomial name
- Pseudobutyrivibrio xylanivorans Kopecný et al. 2003

Species of bacterium

Pseudobutyrivibrio xylanivorans is a species of butyrate-producing bacteria from the rumen. It is Gram-negative, anaerobic, non-spore-forming, curved rod-shaped and motile by means of a single polar or subpolar flagellum. Its type strain is Mz 5^{T} (=DSM 14809^{T} =ATCC BAA-455^{T}). xylanivorans means xylan-digesting.
