= Acetatifactor muris =

Scientific classification
- Domain: Bacteria
- Kingdom: Bacillati
- Phylum: Bacillota
- Class: Clostridia
- Order: Eubacteriales
- Family: Lachnospiraceae
- Genus: Acetatifactor
- Species: A. muris

Binomial name
- Acetatifactor muris Pfeiffer et al. 2013

Type strain
- ATCC BAA-2170, CT-m2, DSM 23669

Species of bacterium

Acetatifactor muris is a bacterium from the genus of Acetatifactor which was isolated from the cecal content of an obese mouse in Freising-Weihenstephan in Germany. The organism is rod-shaped, Gram-positive, anaerobic, and non-motile. The organism does not form spores, and its GC-content is 48%. It does not metabolize glucose, and it tests positive for phenylalanine arylamidase. This species is the type strain for the genus Acetatifactor, which is commonly found in the guts of rodents. The DSM type strain is 23669^{T}, and the ATCC type strain is BAA-2170^{T}.
