= Acetitomaculum ruminis =

Scientific classification
- Domain: Bacteria
- Kingdom: Bacillati
- Phylum: Bacillota
- Class: Clostridia
- Order: Eubacteriales
- Family: Lachnospiraceae
- Genus: Acetitomaculum
- Species: A. ruminis

Binomial name
- Acetitomaculum ruminis Greening and Leedle 1995

Type strain
- 139 B, ATCC 43876, DSM 5522, KCTC 5005, UC 12185

Synonyms
- Acetomaculum ruminis

Species of bacterium

Acetitomaculum ruminis is a Gram-positive bacterium species from the genus of Acetitomaculum which has been isolated from the rumen of a bovine in the United States. Acetitomaculum ruminis utilize formate, glucose and CO_{2}.
