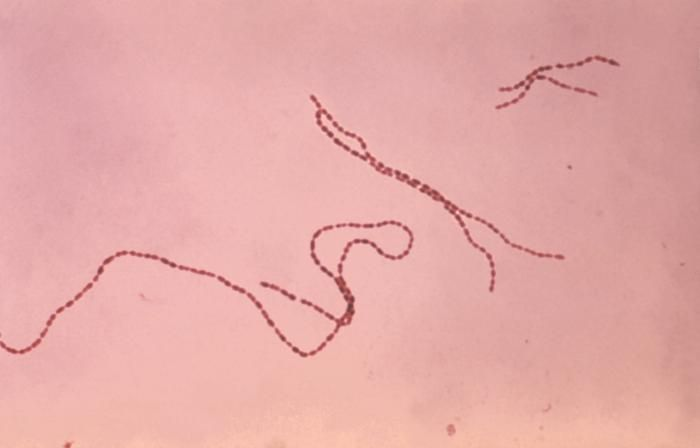

Scientific classification
- Domain: Bacteria
- Kingdom: Bacillati
- Phylum: Bacillota
- Class: Clostridia
- Order: Eubacteriales
- Family: Lachnospiraceae
- Genus: Coprococcus
- Species: C. eutactus

Binomial name
- Coprococcus eutactus Holdeman & Moore, 1974

= Coprococcus eutactus =

Species of bacterium

Coprococcus eutactus is a species of obligately anaerobic, nonmotile, Gram-positive cocci. These bacteria typically appear in pairs or short chains. While usually spherical and measuring between 0.7 and 1.3 micrometers in diameter, the cells may become slightly elongated and lose color in media containing fermentable carbohydrates.

Coprococcus spp., including C. eutactus, have drawn interest as potential microbial biomarkers for gut health. The gut microbiome plays a crucial role in maintaining gastrointestinal function. Emerging evidence suggests a link between autism and disruptions in gut microbiota, although current data are limited.

Coprococcus, specifically Coprococcus eutactus, may impact the desire to exercise by augmenting dopamine activity during physical activity.

C. eutactus is also recognized as a butyrate-producing bacterium, contributing to colonic health by fermenting dietary fibers into short-chain fatty acids (SCFAs). Butyrate serves as a primary energy source for colonocytes and plays a role in reducing inflammation, enhancing gut barrier integrity, and modulating immune responses. The presence of butyrate-producing bacteria like C. eutactus has been associated with various health benefits, including a lower risk of colorectal cancer and improved metabolic outcomes.

== Etymology ==
'kopros' - excrement, faeces; 'kokkos' - berry; 'Coprococcus' - faecal coccus
'eutaktos' - orderly, well-disciplined (referring to the uniform reactions of the different strains)
