= Hungatella effluvii =

Scientific classification
- Domain: Bacteria
- Kingdom: Bacillati
- Phylum: Bacillota
- Class: Clostridia
- Order: Eubacteriales
- Family: Lachnospiraceae
- Genus: Hungatella
- Species: H. effluvii

Binomial name
- Hungatella effluvii Kaur et al. 2014

Type strain
- UB-B.2

Species of bacterium

Hungatella effluvii is a Gram-positive, anaerobic and spore-forming bacterium from the genus Hungatella.
