= Mordavella =

Scientific classification
- Domain: Bacteria
- Kingdom: Bacillati
- Phylum: Bacillota
- Class: Clostridia
- Order: Eubacteriales
- Family: Lachnospiraceae
- Genus: Mordavella; Ndongo et al. 2017

Type species
- "Mordavella massiliensis" Ndongo et al. 2017

Species
- "M. massiliensis"

Genus of bacteria

Mordavella is a Gram-negative bacterial genus from the family of Clostridiaceae with one known species (Mordavella massiliensis). Mordavella massiliensis has been isolated from human feces

== See also ==
- List of bacterial orders
- List of bacteria genera
