= Roseburia inulinivorans =

Scientific classification
- Domain: Bacteria
- Kingdom: Bacillati
- Phylum: Bacillota
- Class: Clostridia
- Order: Eubacteriales
- Family: Lachnospiraceae
- Genus: Roseburia
- Species: R. inulinivorans

Binomial name
- Roseburia inulinivorans Duncan et al. 2006

Species of bacterium

Roseburia inulinivorans is a bacterium first isolated from human faeces. It is anaerobic, Gram-positive or Gram-variable, slightly curved rod-shaped and motile. The cells range in size from 0.5-1.5 to 5.0 micrometres. A2-194(T) (=DSM 16841(T) =NCIMB 14030(T)) is the type strain. First isolated from human faeces in Aberdeen, Scotland.

The abundance of Roseburia inulinivorans has been reported to decline with age and has been associated with greater muscle strength in humans. In mice, there is strong evidence that increasing its levels enhances muscle strength, likely through mechanisms involving modulation of intestinal amino acid availability, alterations in muscle purine metabolism, and an increase in type II muscle fibers. These adaptations have been associated with improvements in muscle performance, with reported increases in strength of up to 30%. However, further studies in humans are required to determine whether these effects are translatable.
