= Stomatobaculum =

Scientific classification
- Domain: Bacteria
- Kingdom: Bacillati
- Phylum: Bacillota
- Class: Clostridia
- Order: Eubacteriales
- Family: Lachnospiraceae
- Genus: Stomatobaculum; Sizova et al. 2013

Type species
- Stomatobaculum longum Sizova et al. 2013

Species
- S. longum

Genus of bacteria

Stomatobaculum is an anaerobic bacterial genus from the family of Lachnospiraceae with one known species (Stomatobaculum longum). Stomatobaculum longum has been isolated from the human dental plaque.

== See also ==
- List of bacterial orders
- List of bacteria genera
