= Roseburia intestinalis =

Scientific classification
- Domain: Bacteria
- Kingdom: Bacillati
- Phylum: Bacillota
- Class: Clostridia
- Order: Lachnospirales
- Family: Lachnospiraceae
- Genus: Roseburia
- Species: R. intestinalis

Binomial name
- Roseburia intestinalis Duncan et al. 2002

Species of bacterium

Roseburia intestinalis is a saccharolytic, butyrate-producing bacterium first isolated from human faeces. It is anaerobic, gram-positive, non-sporeforming, slightly curved rod-shaped and motile by means of multiple subterminal flagella. L1-82^{T} (= DSM 14610^{T} = NCIMB 13810^{T}) is the type strain.
