= Lachnoanaerobaculum orale =

Scientific classification
- Domain: Bacteria
- Kingdom: Bacillati
- Phylum: Bacillota
- Class: Clostridia
- Order: Eubacteriales
- Family: Lachnospiraceae
- Genus: Lachnoanaerobaculum
- Species: L. orale

Binomial name
- Lachnoanaerobaculum orale Hedberg et al. 2012

Type strain
- CCUG 60305, DSM 24553, N1

Species of bacterium

Lachnoanaerobaculum orale is a Gram-positive, saccharolytic, non-proteolytic, anaerobic and spore-forming bacterium from the genus Lachnoanaerobaculum which has been isolated from the saliva from a man in Stockholm in Sweden.
