= Lacrimispora algidixylanolytica =

Scientific classification
- Domain: Bacteria
- Kingdom: Bacillati
- Phylum: Bacillota
- Class: Clostridia
- Order: Lachnospirales
- Family: Lachnospiraceae
- Genus: Lacrimispora
- Species: L. algidixylanolytica

Binomial name
- Lacrimispora algidixylanolytica (Broda et al. 2000) Haas and Blanchard 2020

Type strain
- ATCC BAA-156, DSM 12273, NCIMB 13644, SPL73

Synonyms
- Clostridium algidixylanolyticum Broda et al. 2000

Species of bacterium

Lacrimispora algidixylanolyticum is an obligately anaerobic, psychrotolerant, xylan-degrading and spore-forming bacterium from the genus of Lacrimispora which has been isolated from vacuum packed lamb in New Zealand.
