= Clostridium phytofermentans =

Scientific classification
- Domain: Bacteria
- Kingdom: Bacillati
- Phylum: Bacillota
- Class: Clostridia
- Order: Eubacteriales
- Family: Clostridiaceae
- Genus: Clostridium
- Species: C. phytofermentans

Binomial name
- Clostridium phytofermentans Warnick et al. 2002

Species of bacterium

Clostridium phytofermentans (also called Lachnoclostridium phytofermentans) is an obligately anaerobic rod-shaped spore-forming, Gram-positive bacterium in the family Lachnospiraceae. It is a model organism of interest for its ability to ferment diverse plant polysaccharides including cellulose, hemicellulose, and pectin to ethanol, acetate, and hydrogen. The C. phytofermentans 4.8 Mb genome has been fully sequenced, revealing it contains over 170 enzymes in the CAZy database, though one hydrolase appears to be essential for degrading cellulose.

This species is one of the many phylogenetically-problematic members of Clostridium. Yutin and Galperin proposed in 2013 to move it to its own genus Lachnoclostridium under Lachnospiraceae, but the publication was not validated under the Prokaryotic Code. GTDB concurs with the assignment.
