= Agathobacter =

Scientific classification
- Domain: Bacteria
- Kingdom: Bacillati
- Phylum: Bacillota
- Class: Clostridia
- Order: Eubacteriales
- Family: Lachnospiraceae
- Genus: Agathobacter; Rosero et al. 2016

Type species
- Agathobacter rectalis (Hauduroy et al. 1937) Rosero et al. 2016

Species
- A. rectalis; A. ruminis

Genus of bacteria

Agathobacter is a bacterial genus from the family of Lachnospiraceae.

== Phylogeny ==
The currently accepted taxonomy is based on the List of Prokaryotic names with Standing in Nomenclature (LPSN) and National Center for Biotechnology Information (NCBI)

16S rRNA based LTP_10_2024

- Agathobacter
  - A. rectalis
  - A. ruminis

120 marker proteins based GTDB 09-RS220

- Agathobacter
  - "A. faecis" (Duncan et al. 2006) Goris, Cuadrat & Braune 2021
  - - A. rectalis (Hauduroy et al. 1937) Rosero et al. 2016
    - A. ruminis Rosero et al. 2016

== See also ==
- List of bacterial orders
- List of bacteria genera
