= Lacrimispora indolis =

Scientific classification
- Domain: Bacteria
- Kingdom: Bacillati
- Phylum: Bacillota
- Class: Clostridia
- Order: Lachnospirales
- Family: Lachnospiraceae
- Genus: Lacrimispora
- Species: L. indolis

Binomial name
- Lacrimispora indolis (McClung and McCoy 1957) Haas and Blanchard 2020

Synonyms
- Clostridium indolis

Species of bacterium

Lacrimispora indolis is a Gram-positive, motile, anaerobic, rod-shaped bacteria that produces terminal spores. Lacrimispora indolis was originally named for its ability to hydrolyze tryptophan to indole, pyruvate, and ammonia in the classic indole test which is used to distinguish bacterial species. It is commonly found in soil and can be found in human and bird feces. Colonies of Clostridium indolis are found to be non-hemolytic and have an optimal growth temperature of 37 °C, classifying them as mesophiles.

== Morphology ==
Lacrimispora indolis is Gram-positive, rod-shaped bacteria that occurs singly or in pairs. It has motility due to its peritrichous flagella. It produces round to oval, swollen, terminal or subterminal spores. It is anaerobic, meaning it does not require oxygen. It is also a mesophile, growing best at 37 °C.

Upon plating L. indolis on blood agar, it was found that they were non-hemolytic. The morphology of the colonies was recorded as irregular, convex, translucent to opaque, white, dull granular surface, and an entire to erose margin.

== Genome ==
The genome os C. indolis DSM 775 contains 6,383,701 bp in its circular chromosome with a GC content of 44.93%. Upon sequencing the genome, it was found that it contains an abundance of genes in functional groups associated with the transport and utilization of carbohydrates. The genome encodes 910 genes, including glycoside hydrolases, with the potential to degrade complex carbohydrates.

An astounding 8% of protein coding genes are related to carbohydrate transport in C. indolis. These genes are placed into two different categories: ABC (ATP binding cassette) transporters and PTS (phosphotransferase system) transporters. ABC transporters generally carry oligosaccharides and have a low affinity for hexose. PTS transporters carry a wide variety of monosaccharides and disaccharides, and have a high affinity for hexose. C. indolis contains a greater amount of PTS transporters, which are believed to be beneficial in carbohydrate limited environments.

C. indolis also contains 261 genes related to energy production and conversion. Amongst these, there are genes for citrate utilization, lactate utilization, and nitrogen fixation.

== Ecology ==
C. indolis is commonly isolated from soil as well as human and bird feces. It is associated with infections of the intestinal tract.

== Drug susceptibility ==
Drug Name:
Amoxicillin/clavulanate
Ampicillin
Bacampicillin
Clindamycin
Dalbavancin
Doripenem
Ertapenem
Imipenem
Lincomycin
Linezolid
Meropenem
Metronidazole
Nitazoxanide
Penicillin
Piperacillin/tazobactam
Pristinamycin
Quinupristin-Dalfopristin
Teicoplanin
Telavancin
Tigecycline
Trovafloxacin
