= Hespellia stercorisuis =

Scientific classification
- Domain: Bacteria
- Kingdom: Bacillati
- Phylum: Bacillota
- Class: Clostridia
- Order: Eubacteriales
- Family: Lachnospiraceae
- Genus: Hespellia
- Species: H. stercorisuis

Binomial name
- Hespellia stercorisuis Whitehead et al. 2004

Type strain
- 15480, ATCC BAA-676, ATCC BAA-677, CCUG 46279, CIP 108344, DSM 15480, NRRL B-23456, PC18

Species of bacterium

Hespellia stercorisuis is a Gram-staining, strictly anaerobic, rod-shaped and non-spore-forming bacterium from the genus of Hespellia that has been isolated from swine manure in Peoria in the United States.
