= Faecalicatena orotica =

Scientific classification
- Domain: Bacteria
- Kingdom: Bacillati
- Phylum: Bacillota
- Class: Clostridia
- Order: Eubacteriales
- Family: Lachnospiraceae
- Genus: Faecalicatena
- Species: F. orotica

Binomial name
- Faecalicatena orotica (Wachsman and Barker 1954) Sakamoto et al. 2017

Synonyms
- Clostridium oroticum (Wachsman and Barker 1954) Cato et al. 1968; "Zymobacterium oroticum" Wachsman and Barker 1954

Species of bacterium

Faecalicatena orotica is a bacterium in the family Lachnospiraceae.
