= Lachnoanaerobaculum umeaense =

Scientific classification
- Domain: Bacteria
- Kingdom: Bacillati
- Phylum: Bacillota
- Class: Clostridia
- Order: Eubacteriales
- Family: Lachnospiraceae
- Genus: Lachnoanaerobaculum
- Species: L. umeaense

Binomial name
- Lachnoanaerobaculum umeaense Hedberg et al. 2012

Type strain
- CCUG 58757, CD3:22, DSM 23576

Species of bacterium

Lachnoanaerobaculum umeaense is a Gram-positive, obligately anaerobic, saccharolytic, non-proteolytic and spore-forming bacterium from the genus Lachnoanaerobaculum which has been isolated from the human intestine of a patient in Umeå in Sweden.
