= Enterocloster lavalensis =

Scientific classification
- Domain: Bacteria
- Kingdom: Bacillati
- Phylum: Bacillota
- Class: Clostridia
- Order: Lachnospirales
- Family: Lachnospiraceae
- Genus: Enterocloster
- Species: E. lavalensis

Binomial name
- Enterocloster lavalensis (Domingo et al. 2009) Haas and Blanchard 2020

Synonyms
- Clostridium lavalense

Species of bacterium

Enterocloster lavalensis, formerly Clostridium lavalense is an anaerobic, motile, spore-forming, rod-shaped, gram-positive bacterium first isolated from human feces. The epithet "lavalense" refers to the institution, Université Laval, Québec, Canada.
