= Pseudoruminococcus massiliensis =

Scientific classification
- Domain: Bacteria
- Phylum: Firmicutes
- Class: Clostridia
- Order: Eubacteriales
- Family: Ruminococcaceae
- Genus: Pseudoruminococcus Afouda et al., 2020
- Species: P. massiliensis

Binomial name
- Pseudoruminococcus massiliensis Afouda et al., 2020

Species of anaerobic bacteria

Pseudoruminococcus massiliensis is an anaerobic, Gram-negative, non-motile bacterium. P. massiliensis was first isolated from the gut microbiota of a healthy, 32-year-old Senegalese faecal transplant donor. The bacterium is named massiliensis after the French city of Marseille, where the strain (P3876T (= CSUR P3876))was first isolated in 2017.

Pseudoruminococcus massiliensis belongs to the group of starch-degrading colonic commensals, like its closest relative R. bromii, and seems to have a commensal relationship with the host epithelium.

The species is considered a member of a new genus, Pseudoruminococcus, within the family Ruminococcaceae.

== Structure ==
Pseudoruminococcus massiliensis cells are Gram-negative, obligate-anaerobic cocci. The bacterium's cells are 0.6x0.45μm in size and non-motile.The bacterium does not show catalase and oxidase activities.

Colonies are grey, smooth, and transparent, and have a mean diameter of 0.2-1.5mm.

The bacterium differs from its most closely related species in many various aspects, which include cell length, motility, Gram stain, endospore formation, DNA G+C content, indole production, acid phosphatase activities, and glucose assimilation.

=== Extracellular protrusions ===
Pseudoruminococcusmassiliensis harbours genes, which encode pilin-like proteins. The bacterium has been observed to form filamentous structures when grown on semi-solid GAM agar, which indicates the presence of pili or fimbriae: hairlike appendages on the surface of bacteria that e.g. help them attach to surfaces. This production of extracellular protrusions could play an important role in the successful colonization of the bacterium, although P. massiliensis does not adhere well to mucus and might therefore not adhere to colonic epithelium.

It is possible that the pilus-like structures facilitate other functions like binding to food particles or the formation of biofilms.

== Cultivation ==
Columbia agar supplemented with 5% sheep blood can be used for the standard cultivation of P. massiliensis. Growth is observed at 37°C and the bacterium should be incubated for 96 hours. The pH range for growth is 6.5-7.

== Genetics ==
The G+C content of the genome of P. massiliensis is 37.6%. The bacterium carries 20 glycoside hydrolase encoding genes and is capable of degrading starch in vitro, which has led scientists to believe the bacterium might contribute to fiber degradation, cross-feeding of other species, and butyrate production in the intestinal ecosystem.

== Phylogeny ==
The closest related species to P. massiliensis is Ruminococcus bromii, which is considered a keystone species within the human gut ecosystem due to its ability to degrade/hydrolyze resistant starch and for its contribution to colonic fermentation.
