= Anaerostipes rhamnosivorans =

Scientific classification
- Domain: Bacteria
- Kingdom: Bacillati
- Phylum: Bacillota
- Class: Clostridia
- Order: Eubacteriales
- Family: Lachnospiraceae
- Genus: Anaerostipes
- Species: A. rhamnosivorans

Binomial name
- Anaerostipes rhamnosivorans Bui et al. 2014

Type strain
- 1y-2, DSM 26241, KCTC 15316

Species of bacterium

Anaerostipes rhamnosivorans is a Gram-variable, strictly anaerobic, spore-forming, butyrate-producing and curly rod-shaped bacterium from the genus Anaerostipes which has been isolated from the human faeces of an infant in the Netherlands.
