= Enterocloster asparagiformis =

Scientific classification
- Domain: Bacteria
- Kingdom: Bacillati
- Phylum: Bacillota
- Class: Clostridia
- Order: Lachnospirales
- Family: Lachnospiraceae
- Genus: Enterocloster
- Species: E. asparagiformis

Binomial name
- Enterocloster asparagiformis (Mohan et al. 2007) Haas and Blanchard. 2020

Type strain
- N6, CCUG 48471, DIFE N6, DSM 15981

Synonyms
- Clostridium asparagiforme Mohan et al. 2007

Species of bacterium

Enterocloster asparagiformis, formerly Clostridium asparagiforme, is a Gram-positive, obligately anaerobic and rod-shaped bacterium. It was isolated from human faeces in Germany.
