= Fusicatenibacter saccharivorans =

Scientific classification
- Domain: Bacteria
- Kingdom: Bacillati
- Phylum: Bacillota
- Class: Clostridia
- Order: Eubacteriales
- Family: Lachnospiraceae
- Genus: Fusicatenibacter
- Species: F. saccharivorans

Binomial name
- Fusicatenibacter saccharivorans Takada et al. 2013

Species of bacterium

Fusicatenibacter saccharivorans is a species of anoxic, Gram-positive, non-motile bacteria that was first isolated from human faeces. It has a spindle shape and is non-spore-forming. The bacterium ferments glucose to produce lactic acid, formic acid, acetic acid and succinic acid. The type strain of the species is HT03-11(T) ( = YIT 12554(T) = JCM 18507(T) = DSM 26062(T)).

== Relationship with intrahepatic cholangiocarcinoma ==
Fusicatenibacter saccharivorans is enriched in fecal samples of patients with intrahepatic cholangiocarcinoma (ICC). Studies in mice suggest that F. saccharivorans can accelerate and facilitate ICC progression by suppressing CD8+ T cells. This is mediated by a protein produced by the bacterium, Pepd.
