= Dorea formicigenerans =

Scientific classification
- Domain: Bacteria
- Kingdom: Bacillati
- Phylum: Bacillota
- Class: Clostridia
- Order: Eubacteriales
- Family: Lachnospiraceae
- Genus: Dorea
- Species: D. formicigenerans

Binomial name
- Dorea formicigenerans (Holdeman and Moore, 1974) Taras et al., 2002

Type strain
- ATCC 27755, DSM 3992, JCM 10342, JCM 9500, VPI C8-13

Synonyms
- Eubacterium formicigenerans

Species of bacterium

Dorea formicigenerans is a Gram-positive, obligately anaerobic, non-spore-forming, and rod-shaped bacterium from the genus Dorea and is found in human faeces.
