= Beta-D-galactosyl-(1-4)-L-rhamnose phosphorylase =

Class of enzymes

Beta-D-galactosyl-(1->4)-L-rhamnose phosphorylase

Identifiers
- EC no.: 2.4.1.247
- CAS no.: 1236189-79-9

Databases
- IntEnz: IntEnz view
- BRENDA: BRENDA entry
- ExPASy: NiceZyme view
- KEGG: KEGG entry
- MetaCyc: metabolic pathway
- PRIAM: profile
- PDB structures: RCSB PDB PDBe PDBsum
Search
- PMC: articles
- PubMed: articles
- NCBI: proteins

Beta-D-galactosyl-(1->4)-L-rhamnose phosphorylase (EC 2.4.1.247, D-galactosyl-beta1->4-L-rhamnose phosphorylase, GalRhaP) is an enzyme with systematic name beta-D-galactosyl-(1->4)-L-rhamnose:phosphate 1-alpha-D-galactosyltransferase. This enzyme catalyses the following chemical reaction

beta-D-galactosyl-(1->4)-L-rhamnose + phosphate $\rightleftharpoons$ L-rhamnose + alpha-D-galactose 1-phosphate

The enzyme from Clostridium phytofermentans is also active towards beta-D-galactosyl derivatives of L-mannose, L-lyxose, D-glucose, 2-deoxy-D-glucose, and D-galactose.
