= Blautia obeum =

Scientific classification
- Domain: Bacteria
- Kingdom: Bacillati
- Phylum: Bacillota
- Class: Clostridia
- Order: Eubacteriales
- Family: Lachnospiraceae
- Genus: Blautia
- Species: B. obeum

Binomial name
- Blautia obeum (Moore et al. 1976) Lawson and Finegold 2015

Synonyms
- Ruminococcus obeum

Species of bacterium

Blautia obeum is a species of anaerobic, gram-positive bacteria found in the gut.

B. obeum was part of a taxonomic anomaly to the Rules of Bacterial Code where it was named Ruminococcus obeum but placed in the Blautia genus. B. obeum may therefore be referred to as R. obeum in some studies.

It has been shown that B. obeum along with other relevant taxa play an important role both in the recovery process from Vibrio cholerae infection and microbiota maturation in children. Moreover, experiments in model mice show that B. obeum reduces the pathogenicity of V. cholerae. The data show that the expression of quorum sensing autoinducers by B. obeum is increased in V. cholera infections and they repress the expression of several V. cholera virulence factors.
