= Hungatella hathewayi =

Scientific classification
- Domain: Bacteria
- Kingdom: Bacillati
- Phylum: Bacillota
- Class: Clostridia
- Order: Eubacteriales
- Family: Lachnospiraceae
- Genus: Hungatella
- Species: H. hathewayi

Binomial name
- Hungatella hathewayi (Steer et al. 2002) Kaur et al. 2014

Synonyms
- Clostridium hathewayi

Species of bacterium

Hungatella hathewayi is a species of Gram-positive, endospore-forming and rod-shaped bacteria from the genus Hungatella. Hungatella hathewayi can cause infection in Humans in rare cases.
