= Anaerostipes caccae =

Scientific classification
- Domain: Bacteria
- Kingdom: Bacillati
- Phylum: Bacillota
- Class: Clostridia
- Order: Eubacteriales
- Family: Lachnospiraceae
- Genus: Anaerostipes
- Species: A. caccae

Binomial name
- Anaerostipes caccae Schwiertz et al. 2002

Type strain
- CCUG 47493, CIP 108612, DSM 14662, JCM 13470, KCTC 15019, L1-92, NCIMB 13811, VTT E-052773

Synonyms
- Eubacterium entericum

Species of bacterium

Anaerostipes caccae is a Gram-variable, anaerobic saccharolytic, rod-shaped butyrate-producing and acetate and lactate-utilising bacterium from the genus Anaerostipes which has been isolated from human feces.
