= Enterocloster clostridioformis =

Scientific classification
- Domain: Bacteria
- Kingdom: Bacillati
- Phylum: Bacillota
- Class: Clostridia
- Order: Lachnospirales
- Family: Lachnospiraceae
- Genus: Enterocloster
- Species: E. clostridioformis

Binomial name
- Enterocloster clostridioformis (Burri and Ankersmit 1906) Haas and Blanchard 2020

Synonyms
- Bacterium colstridiiforme; Bacteroides clostridiiformis; Clostridium clostridioforme (Burri and Ankersmit 1906) Kaneuchi et al. 1976; Clostridium clostridiiforme

Species of bacterium

Enterocloster clostridioformis, formerly known as Clostridium clostridioforme, is an anaerobic, motile, Gram-positive bacterium.

== Description ==
E. clostridioformis are rod-shaped bacteria which cannot grow in the presence of oxygen. While Clostridium species have cell walls that resemble gram-positive bacteria, E. clostridioformis often appears negative by Gram stain.

== History ==
The organism now classified as E. clostridioformis was first identified in the 1950s in human and animal feces and assigned to the genus of Gram-negative non-spore-forming bacteria Bacteroides. In subsequent years, these bacteria were shown to form spores, causing them to be reclassified in the genus Clostridium. Most recently this species has been reclassified as E. clostridioformis based on phylogeny.
