= Emma Allen-Vercoe =

British-Canadian Molecular Biologist

- Education: Veterinary Laboratories Agency; Health Protection Agency
- Scientific career
- Workplaces: University of Calgary; University of Guelph
- Thesis: The role of fimbriae and flagella in the pathogenesis of Salmonella enteritidis phage-type 4 infections. (1999)

Emma Allen-Vercoe is a British-Canadian Molecular biologist who is a Professor and Canada Research Chair at the University of Guelph. Her research considers the gut microbiome and microbial therapeutics to treat Escherichia coli.

== Early life and education ==
Allen-Vercoe was an undergraduate student at the Veterinary Laboratories Agency. She moved to the Health Protection Agency for her graduate studies, where she worked under the supervision of Martin Woodward. Here she studied Salmonella enterica and the processes by which enteric pathogens cause disease. She was a postdoctoral researcher at the Health Protection Agency. During her doctorate, she studied Mycobacterium tuberculosis and Campylobacter jejuni.

== Research and career ==
In 2001, Allen-Vercoe moved to Canada, where she joined the University of Calgary. Allen-Vercoe worked on Escherichia coli. In 2004, she was awarded a Canadian Association of Gastroenterology Fellow-to-Faculty Transition Award. She moved to the University of Guelph in 2007. Her research considers the gut microbiome. She worked with the biotechnology company Infors to create a bioreactor that can maintain biological samples in specific anaerobic atmospheres whilst her research team studying the constituents microbes.

The Allen-Vercoe lab developed the Robogut, a bioreactor system that mimics the human gut environment, allowing researchers to culture human-associated bacteria that cannot grow in standard laboratory conditions. Her lab isolates bacteria from human stool samples and cultures them in this system to better characterize the microbes that live in the gut. For example, the Robogut (or mechanical colon) can recreate environments that allow for particular genes and bacteria to thrive, which allows Allen-Vercoe to study the microbiobes associated with certain medical conditions. Allen-Vercoe has identified the general bacteria that exist in all microbiomes, as well as monitoring the microbiome's metabolomics. She has worked on microbial therapeutics to treat various diseases, including Clostridioides difficile infection and cancer. Allen-Vercoe is also a co-founder of the Canadian Bee Gut Project at the University of Guelph, which aims to elucidate the structure and function of the honeybee gut microbiome.

Allen-Vercoe launched the NuBiyota in 2013, a biotechnology company that looks to grow microbes in a controlled environment. She was awarded a Tier 1 Canada Research Chair in 2019, which allowed her to study the influence of the gut microbiome on health and disease.

== Selected publications ==
- Ross, Matthew; García, Nathalia; Bonazzi, Vivien; et al. (2012). "Structure, function and diversity of the healthy human microbiome". Nature. 486 (7402): 207–14. Bibcode:2012Natur.486..207T. doi:10.1038/nature11234. PMC 3564958. PMID 22699609. Wikidata Q24626370.
- Clark, Stephen; Adrienne C Ma; Samantha A Tavener; et al. (2007). "Platelet TLR4 activates neutrophil extracellular traps to ensnare bacteria in septic blood". Nature medicine. 13 (4): 463–9. doi:10.1038/nm1565. PMID 17384648. Wikidata Q28294906.
- Ross, Matthew; Fah Sathirapongsasuti; García, Nathalia; et al. (2012). "A framework for human microbiome research". Nature. 486 (7402): 215–21. doi:10.1038/nature11209. PMC 3377744. PMID 22699610. Wikidata Q24602401.
