= Robinsoniella =

Scientific classification
- Domain: Bacteria
- Kingdom: Bacillati
- Phylum: Bacillota
- Class: Clostridia
- Order: Eubacteriales
- Family: Lachnospiraceae
- Genus: Robinsoniella; Cotta et al. 2009

Type species
- Robinsoniella peoriensis Cotta et al. 2009

Species
- R. peoriensis

Genus of bacteria

Robinsoniella is an anaerobic, Gram-positive, spore-forming and non-motile bacterial genus from the family of Lachnospiraceae with one known species, Robinsoniella peoriensis.

== See also ==
- List of bacterial orders
- List of bacteria genera
