= Roseburia faecis =

Scientific classification
- Domain: Bacteria
- Kingdom: Bacillati
- Phylum: Bacillota
- Class: Clostridia
- Order: Lachnospirales
- Family: Lachnospiraceae
- Genus: Roseburia
- Species: R. faecis

Binomial name
- Roseburia faecis Duncan et al. 2006

Species of bacterium

Roseburia faecis is a bacterium first isolated from human faeces. It is anaerobic, gram-negative or Gram-variable, slightly curved rod-shaped and motile. The cells range in size from 0.5-1.5 to 5.0 micrometres. M72/1(T)=DSM 16840(T)=NCIMB 14031(T)) is the type strain.
