= Faecalicatena =

Scientific classification
- Domain: Bacteria
- Kingdom: Bacillati
- Phylum: Bacillota
- Class: Clostridia
- Order: Eubacteriales
- Family: Lachnospiraceae
- Genus: Faecalicatena; Sakamoto et al. 2017

Type species
- Faecalicatena contorta (Prévot 1947) Sakamoto, Iino & Ohkuma 2017

Species
- F. absiana; F. acetigenes; F. contorta; F. faecalis; F. fissicatena; F. orotica

Synonyms
- "Zymobacterium" Wachsman & Barker 1954

Genus of bacteria

Faecalicatena is a bacterial genus from the family Lachnospiraceae.

== Phylogeny ==
The currently accepted taxonomy is based on the List of Prokaryotic names with Standing in Nomenclature (LPSN) and National Center for Biotechnology Information (NCBI)

16S rRNA based LTP_10_2024

- - - Dorea ammoniilytica Hitch et al. 2022
    - Faecalicatena absiana Shin et al. 2022
  - - Muricomes intestini Lagkouvardos et al. 2016
    - - Faecalicatena
        - - F. faecalis Oh et al. 2023
          - F. orotica (Wachsman & Barker 1954) Sakamoto, Iino & Ohkuma 2017
        - - F. contorta (Prévot 1947) Sakamoto, Iino & Ohkuma 2017
          - F. fissicatena (Taylor 1972) Sakamoto, Iino & Ohkuma 2017

120 marker proteins based GTDB 09-RS220

- Muricomes
  - - Faecalicatena faecalis
    - Faecalicatena orotica
  - - M. intestini
    - - Faecalicatena contorta
      - Faecalicatena fissicatena
