= Lachnobacterium =

Scientific classification
- Domain: Bacteria
- Kingdom: Bacillati
- Phylum: Bacillota
- Class: Clostridia
- Order: Eubacteriales
- Family: Lachnospiraceae
- Genus: Lachnobacterium; Whitford et al. 2001

Type species
- Lachnobacterium bovis Whitford et al. 2001

Species
- L. bovis

Genus of bacteria

Lachnobacterium is a Gram-positive, non-spore-forming and anaerobic bacterial genus from the family of Lachnospiraceae with one known species (Lachnobacterium bovis). Lachnobacterium bovis has been isolated from the rumen and faeces of cattle.

== See also ==
- List of bacterial orders
- List of bacteria genera
