= Parasporobacterium =

Scientific classification
- Domain: Bacteria
- Kingdom: Bacillati
- Phylum: Bacillota
- Class: Clostridia
- Order: Eubacteriales
- Family: Lachnospiraceae
- Genus: Parasporobacterium; Lomans et al. 2004

Type species
- Parasporobacterium paucivorans Lomans et al. 2004

Species
- P. paucivorans

Genus of bacteria

Parasporobacterium is a Gram-negative and strictly anaerobic bacterial genus from the family of Lachnospiraceae with one known species (Parasporobacterium paucivorans).

== See also ==
- List of bacterial orders
- List of bacteria genera
