= Software Testing, Verification & Reliability =

Software Testing, Verification and Reliability
- Discipline: Software engineering
- Language: English
- Edited by: Tao Xie and Robert M. Hierons

Publication details
- History: 1991–present
- Publisher: John Wiley & Sons
- Frequency: 8/year
- Impact factor: 1.267 (2020)

Standard abbreviations
- ISO 4: Softw. Test. Verif. Reliab.

Indexing
- CODEN: JTREET
- ISSN: 0960-0833 (print); 1099-1689 (web)
- LCCN: 2001212279
- OCLC no.: 27920252

Links
- Journal homepage; Online access; Online archive

Software Testing, Verification, & Reliability is a peer-reviewed scientific journal in the field of software testing, verification, and reliability published by John Wiley & Sons.

STVR was founded in 1991 by Derek Yates. Martin Woodward become editor-in-chief in 1992, and was later joined by Lee White. They were succeeded in 2006 by Jeff Offutt, who was joined by Rob Hierons in 2011. Jeff Offutt resigned and Tao Xie became co editor-in-chief in July 2019.

== Abstracting and indexing ==
The journal is abstracted and indexed in the Science Citation Index Expanded and Current Contents/Engineering, Computing & Technology. According to the Journal Citation Reports, the journal has a 2020 impact factor of 1.267.

== See also ==
- List of computer science journals
- List of engineering journals and magazines
