= Catonella =

Scientific classification
- Domain: Bacteria
- Kingdom: Bacillati
- Phylum: Bacillota
- Class: Clostridia
- Order: Eubacteriales
- Family: Lachnospiraceae
- Genus: Catonella; Moore and Moore 1994

Type species
- Catonella morbi Moore & Moore 1994

Species
- "C. massiliensis"; C. morbi

Genus of bacteria

Catonella is a Gram-negative, obligately anaerobic, non-spore-forming and non-motile bacterial genus from the family of Lachnospiraceae with one known species (Catonella morbi). Catonella morbi occur in the gingival crevice of humans.

== See also ==
- List of bacterial orders
- List of bacteria genera
