= Blautia =

Scientific classification
- Domain: Bacteria
- Kingdom: Bacillati
- Phylum: Bacillota
- Class: Clostridia
- Order: Eubacteriales
- Family: Lachnospiraceae
- Genus: Blautia; Liu et al. 2008

Type species
- Blautia coccoides (Kaneuchi, Benno & Mitsuoka 1976) Liu et al. 2008

Species
- See text

Genus of bacteria

Blautia is a genus of anaerobic bacteria. Upon introduction, this genus mostly consisted of species previously described in the genus Ruminococcus.

== Phylogeny ==
The currently accepted taxonomy is based on the List of Prokaryotic names with Standing in Nomenclature (LPSN) and National Center for Biotechnology Information (NCBI)

16S rRNA based LTP_10_2024

- - Blautia hydrogenotrophica
  - - - Blautia faecicola Kim et al. 2020
      - - Hoministercoradaptatus
        - Oliverpabstia
    - - Blautia
        - - - B. argi
            - B. hansenii
          - - B. stercoris
            - - - B. coccoides
                - B. producta
              - - B. pseudococcoides
                - - B. hominis
                  - - B. celeris
                    - B. parvula Miura et al. 2023
        - - - B. fusiformis
            - - - B. luti
                - B. wexlerae
              - - B. intestinalis
                - B. obeum
          - - - B. glucerasea corrig. Furuya et al. 2010
              - - B. caecimuris
                - B. schinkii
            - - B. ammoniilytica
              - - B. acetigignens
                - B. faecis

120 marker proteins based GTDB 09-RS220

- - - Lactonifactor
    - - Blautia
        - - B. stercoris Park et al. 2012
          - - B. celeris Liu et al. 2022
            - - B. coccoides (Kaneuchi, Benno & Mitsuoka 1976) Liu et al. 2008
                [incl. B. producta (Prévot 1941) Liu et al. 2008]
              - - B. hominis Shin et al. 2018
                - B. pseudococcoides Maturana & Cárdenas 2022
        - - "Ca. B. merdavium" Gilroy et al. 2021
          - - - B. hansenii (Holdeman & Moore 1974) Liu et al. 2008
              - - B. argi Paek et al. 2019
                - "Ca. B. stercoravium" Gilroy et al. 2021
            - - "Ca. B. pullicola" Gilroy et al. 2021
              - - - "Ca. B. merdipullorum" Gilroy et al. 2021
                  - "Ca. B. stercoripullorum" Gilroy et al. 2021
                - - - "Ca. B. merdigallinarum" Gilroy et al. 2021
                    - "Ca. B. ornithocaccae" Gilroy et al. 2021
                  - - "Ca. B. pullistercoris" Gilroy et al. 2021
                    - - "Ca. B. avicola" Gilroy et al. 2021
                      - "Ca. B. stercorigallinarum" Gilroy et al. 2021
  - - Blautia species‑group 2
      - - "Ca. B. gallistercoris" Gilroy et al. 2021
        - - B. hydrogenotrophica (Bernalier et al. 1997) Liu et al. 2008
          - "Ca. B. intestinigallinarum" Gilroy et al. 2021
      - - "Ca. B. avistercoris" Gilroy et al. 2021
        - - - B. schinkii (Rieu-Lesme et al. 1997) Liu et al. 2008
            - - "Ca. B. faecavium" Gilroy et al. 2021
              - "Ca. B. faecigallinarum" Gilroy et al. 2021
          - - - - B. ammoniilytica Hitch et al.
                - - B. acetigignens Hitch et al. 2022
                  - B. faecis Park, Kim & Bae 2013
              - - B. fusiformis Afrizal et al. 2023
                - - "B. difficilis" Liu et al. 2021
                  - - B. luti (Simmering et al. 2002) Liu et al.
                    - B. wexlerae Liu et al. 2008
            - - - B. intestinalis Wang et al. 2021
                - B. obeum (Moore, Johnson & Holdeman 1976) Lawson & Finegold 2015
              - - B. caecimuris Lagkouvardos et al. 2016
                - - "Ca. B. excrementigallinarum" Gilroy et al. 2021
                  - - "Ca. B. faecipullorum" Gilroy et al. 2021
                    - - "Ca. B. excrementipullorum" Gilroy et al. 2021
                      - - "Ca. B. intestinavium" Gilroy et al. 2021
                        - "Ca. B. intestinipullorum" Gilroy et al. 2021

Species incertae sedis:

- "B. aquisgranensis" Hitch et al. 2024
- "B. arthritidis" Huang et al. 2024
- "B. brookingsii" Ghimire et al. 2020
- "B. caccae" Hitch et al. 2024
- "Ca. B. equi" Gilroy et al. 2022
- "B. flagellata" Huang et al. 2024
- "B. immobilis" Huang et al. 2024
- "B. intestinihominis" Hitch et al. 2024
- "B. lenta" Liu et al. 2021
- "B. longa" Huang et al. 2024
- "B. ovalis" Huang et al. 2024
- "B. phocaeensis" Traore et al. 2017
- "B. provencensis" Pham et al. 2017
- "B. segnis" Liu et al. 2021
