= Dorea =

Scientific classification
- Domain: Bacteria
- Kingdom: Bacillati
- Phylum: Bacillota
- Class: Clostridia
- Order: Lachnospirales
- Family: Lachnospiraceae
- Genus: Dorea; Taras et al. 2002

Type species
- Dorea formicigenerans (Holdeman and Moore, 1974) Taras et al. 2002

Species
- D. acetigenes; D. ammoniilytica; D. amylophila; D. formicigenerans; D. hominis; D. longicatena; "D. phocaeensis"

Genus of bacteria

Dorea is a Gram-positive and nonspore-forming bacterial genus from the family Lachnospiraceae, which occur in human faeces.

== See also ==
- List of bacterial orders
- List of bacteria genera
