= Johnsonella =

Scientific classification
- Domain: Bacteria
- Kingdom: Bacillati
- Phylum: Bacillota
- Class: Clostridia
- Order: Eubacteriales
- Family: Lachnospiraceae
- Genus: Johnsonella; Moore and Moore 1994

Type species
- Johnsonella ignava Moore & Moore 1994

Species
- J. ignava

Genus of prokaryotes

Johnsonella is a Gram-negative, non-spore-forming and non-motil bacterial genus from the family of Lachnospiraceae with one known species (Johnsonella ignava). Johnsonella ignava occur in the gingival crevice of humans.

== See also ==
- List of bacterial orders
- List of bacteria genera
