= Enterocloster citroniae =

Scientific classification
- Domain: Bacteria
- Kingdom: Bacillati
- Phylum: Bacillota
- Class: Clostridia
- Order: Lachnospirales
- Family: Lachnospiraceae
- Genus: Enterocloster
- Species: E. citroniae

Binomial name
- Enterocloster citroniae (Warren et al. 2007) Haas and Blanchard 2020

Type strain
- TCC BAA-1317, CCUG 52203, DSM 19261, RMA 16102

Synonyms
- Clostridium citroniae

Species of bacterium

Enterocloster citroniae, formerly Clostridium citroniae is a bacterium from the genus Enterocloster. The type species was isolated from a human infection in California in the United States.
