= Shuttleworthia =

Scientific classification
- Domain: Bacteria
- Kingdom: Bacillati
- Phylum: Bacillota
- Class: Clostridia
- Order: Eubacteriales
- Family: Lachnospiraceae
- Genus: Shuttleworthia; Downes et al. 2002
- Species: S. satelles

Binomial name
- Shuttleworthia satelles Downes et al. 2002

Genus of bacteria

Shuttleworthia is a Gram-positive, non-spore-forming, obligately anaerobic and non-motile bacterial genus from the family Lachnospiraceae with one known species (Shuttleworthia satelles). Shuttleworthia satelles has been isolated from the human periodontal pocket.
