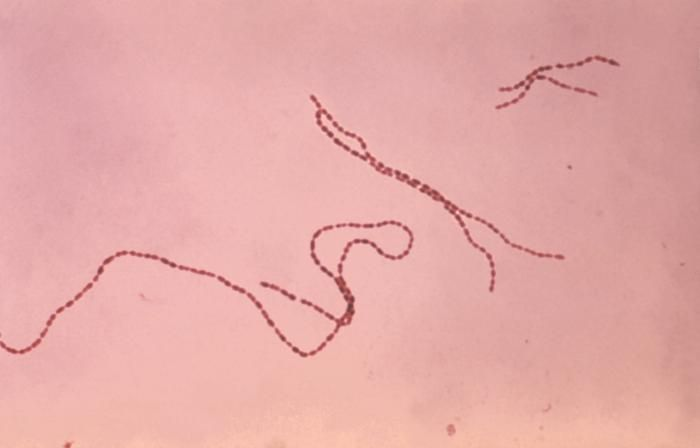

Scientific classification
- Domain: Bacteria
- Kingdom: Bacillati
- Phylum: Bacillota
- Class: Clostridia
- Order: Eubacteriales
- Family: Lachnospiraceae
- Genus: Coprococcus; Holdeman and Moore 1974

Type species
- Coprococcus eutactus Holdeman and Moore 1974

Species
- C. aceti; C. ammoniilyticus; C. eutactus; C. hominis; C. immobilis; C. intestinihominis; C. mobilis

= Coprococcus =

Genus of bacteria

Coprococcus is a genus of obligately anaerobic, nonmotile, Gram-positive cocci that are part of the human and animal gut microbiota.

Coprococcus spp. are notable for their ability to ferment dietary fibers into short-chain fatty acids, especially butyrate, which is a key metabolite that supports colonocyte health, enhances mucosal integrity, and has anti-inflammatory properties. The genus is considered an important contributor to colonic homeostasis and overall gut health.

Depletion of Coprococcus has been reported in patients with colorectal cancer, although a direct protective role remains to be fully established.

One species, Coprococcus comes, may also influence the efficacy of blood pressure-lowering medications by modifying gut metabolism of esterified angiotensin-converting enzyme (ACE) inhibitors.

== Phylogeny ==
The currently accepted taxonomy is based on the List of Prokaryotic names with Standing in Nomenclature (LPSN) and the National Center for Biotechnology Information (NCBI)

16S rRNA-based LTP_10_2024

- Coprococcus
  - C. eutactus Holdeman & Moore 1974
  - - C. ammoniilyticus Hitch et al. 2022
    - C. hominis Liu et al. 2022

120 marker gene-based GTDB 09-RS220

- Coprococcus
  - C. eutactus
  - C. ammoniilyticus

Additional species placed elsewhere in LTP and GTDB phylogenies:

- Coprococcus catus Holdeman and Moore 1974
- Coprococcus comes Holdeman and Moore 1974
- "Coprococcus phoceensis" Bonnet et al. 2019

== Etymology ==
From Ancient Greek:

- kopros – excrement, faeces
- kokkos – berry

→ Coprococcus – faecal coccus

== See also ==
- List of bacterial orders
- List of bacteria genera
