= Falcatimonas =

Scientific classification
- Domain: Bacteria
- Kingdom: Bacillati
- Phylum: Bacillota
- Class: Clostridia
- Order: Eubacteriales
- Family: Lachnospiraceae
- Genus: Falcatimonas; Watanabe et al. 2016

Type species
- Falcatimonas natans Watanabe et al. 2016

Species
- F. natans

Genus of bacteria

Falcatimonas is a Gram-positive and strictly anaerobic bacterial genus from the family of Clostridiaceae with one known species (Falcatimonas natans). Falcatimonas natans has been isolated from a methanogenic reactor which was filled with cattle waste.

== See also ==
- List of bacterial orders
- List of bacteria genera
