= Acetitomaculum =

Scientific classification
- Domain: Bacteria
- Kingdom: Bacillati
- Phylum: Bacillota
- Class: Clostridia
- Order: Eubacteriales
- Family: Lachnospiraceae
- Genus: Acetitomaculum; Greening and Leedle 1995

Type species
- Acetitomaculum ruminis Greening & Leedle 1995

Species
- A. ruminis

Genus of bacteria

Acetitomaculum is a genus in the phylum Bacillota (Bacteria). The single species is an acetogenic bacteria from the bovine rumen.

== History ==
The genus Acetitomaculum was originally created to describe strains of bacteria isolated from a mature Hereford crossbred steer fed a typical high forage diet. They were isolated in a screen for acetate-producing bacteria extracted from the steer rumen.

== Etymology ==
The name of the genus is derived from the Latin noun acetum, meaning vinegar, combined with the Latin noun tomaculum, a kind of sausage. Together they form Acetitomaculum, literally a kind of vinegar sausage. The name of the type species, A. ruminis is derived from the Latin genitive noun ruminis, meaning "of the rumen".

== Characteristics ==
Members of Acetitomaculum are Gram-positive rods which can utilize formate, glucose, and carbon monoxide.

The genus contains a single species, A. ruminis, which is the type species of the genus.

== See also ==
- Bacterial taxonomy
- List of bacterial orders
- List of bacteria genera
- Microbiology
