= Sporobacterium =

Scientific classification
- Domain: Bacteria
- Kingdom: Bacillati
- Phylum: Bacillota
- Class: Clostridia
- Order: Eubacteriales
- Family: Lachnospiraceae
- Genus: Sporobacterium; Mechichi et al. 1999
- Species: S. olearium

Binomial name
- Sporobacterium olearium Mechichi et al. 1999

Genus of bacteria

Sporobacterium is a Gram-positive, strictly anaerobic and chemoorganotrophic bacterial genus from the family Lachnospiraceae with one known species (Sporobacterium olearium). Sporobacterium olearium produces methanethiol.
