= Anaerostipes =

Scientific classification
- Domain: Bacteria
- Kingdom: Bacillati
- Phylum: Bacillota
- Class: Clostridia
- Order: Eubacteriales
- Family: Lachnospiraceae
- Genus: Anaerostipes; Schwiertz et al. 2002

Type species
- Anaerostipes caccae Schwiertz et al. 2002

Species
- A. amylophilus; A. butyraticus; A. caccae; A. faecalis; A. faecis; A. hadrus; A. hominis; A. rhamnosivorans

Genus of bacteria

Anaerostipes is a Gram positive and anaerobic bacterial genus from the family of Lachnospiraceae. Anaerostipes occurs in the human gut. Anaerostipes may protect against colon cancer in humans by producing butyric acid.

== Phylogeny ==
The currently accepted taxonomy is based on the List of Prokaryotic names with Standing in Nomenclature (LPSN) and National Center for Biotechnology Information (NCBI)

16S rRNA based LTP_10_2024

- Anaerostipes
  - - A. rhamnosivorans
    - - A. caccae
      - A. hominis
  - - - A. butyraticus
      - A. faecalis
    - - A. amylophilus
      - A. hadrus

120 marker proteins based GTDB 09-RS220

- Anaerostipes
  - - A. rhamnosivorans Bui, de Vos &Plugge 2014
    - - A. caccae Schwiertz et al. 2002
      - A. hominis Lee et al. 2021
  - - - A. faecalis Choi et al. 2022
      - - A. amylophilus Hitch et al. 2022
        - A. hadrus (Moore, Johnson & Holdeman 1976) Allen-Vercoe et al. 2013
    - - "Ca. A. excrementavium" Gilroy et al. 2021
      - - "Ca. A. avistercoris" Gilroy et al. 2021
        - A. butyraticus Eeckhaut et al. 2010
