= Cuneatibacter =

Scientific classification
- Domain: Bacteria
- Kingdom: Bacillati
- Phylum: Bacillota
- Class: Clostridia
- Order: Eubacteriales
- Family: Lachnospiraceae
- Genus: Cuneatibacter; Lagkouvardos et al. 2016

Type species
- Cuneatibacter caecimuris Lagkouvardos et al. 2016

Species
- C. caecimuris

Genus of bacteria

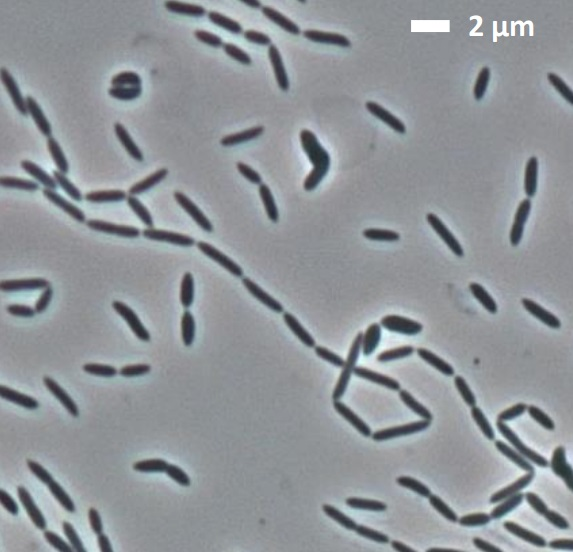
Cuneatibacter caecimuris

Cuneatibacter is a rod-shaped bacterial genus from the family of Lachnospiraceae with one known species (Cuneatibacter caecimuris).

== See also ==
- List of bacterial orders
- List of bacteria genera
