= Acetatifactor =

Scientific classification
- Domain: Bacteria
- Kingdom: Bacillati
- Phylum: Bacillota
- Class: Clostridia
- Order: Eubacteriales
- Family: Lachnospiraceae
- Genus: Acetatifactor; Pfeiffer et al. 2013

Type species
- Acetatifactor muris Pfeiffer et al. 2013

Species
- A. aquisgranensis; "Ca. A. stercoripullorum"; A. muris

Genus of bacteria

Acetatifactor is a bacterial genus from the family of Lachnospiraceae. As of 2025, there are only two species in this genus, Acetatifactor muris. and Acetatifactor aquisgranensis.

== Phylogeny ==
The currently accepted taxonomy is based on the List of Prokaryotic names with Standing in Nomenclature (LPSN) and National Center for Biotechnology Information (NCBI)

16S rRNA based LTP_10_2024

- Acetatifactor
  - A. aquisgranensis
  - A. muris

120 marker proteins based GTDB 09-RS220

- Acetatifactor
  - - A. aquisgranensis Afrizal et al. 2024
    - A. muris Pfeiffer et al. 2013
  - - "Ca. A. stercoripullorum" Gilroy et al. 2021
    - Waltera intestinalis Wylensek et al. 2021
