= Butyrivibrio hungatei =

Scientific classification
- Domain: Bacteria
- Kingdom: Bacillati
- Phylum: Bacillota
- Class: Clostridia
- Order: Eubacteriales
- Family: Lachnospiraceae
- Genus: Butyrivibrio
- Species: B. hungatei

Binomial name
- Butyrivibrio hungatei Kopecný et al. 2003

Species of bacterium

Butyrivibrio hungatei is a species of Gram-negative, anaerobic, non-spore-forming, butyrate-producing bacterium. It is a curved, rod-shaped, motile bacterium with a single polar or subpolar flagellum, and is commonly found in the rumen of ruminants. The type strain is JK 615^{T} (= DSM 14810^{T} = ATCC BAA-456^{T}).
