= Marvinbryantia =

Scientific classification
- Domain: Bacteria
- Kingdom: Bacillati
- Phylum: Bacillota
- Class: Clostridia
- Order: Eubacteriales
- Family: Lachnospiraceae
- Genus: Marvinbryantia; Wolin et al. 2008

Type species
- Marvinbryantia formatexigens (Wolin et al. 2004) Wolin et al. 2008

Species
- M. formatexigens

Synonyms
- Bryantella Wolin et al. 2004 non Britton, 1957 non Chickering, 1946

Genus of bacteria

Marvinbryantia is a cellulose and methylcellulose degrading bacterial genus from the family of Lachnospiraceae with one known species (Marvinbryantia formatexigens). Marvinbryantia formatexigens occurs in human feces.

== See also ==
- List of bacterial orders
- List of bacteria genera
