= Jeff Offutt =

American academic computer scientist

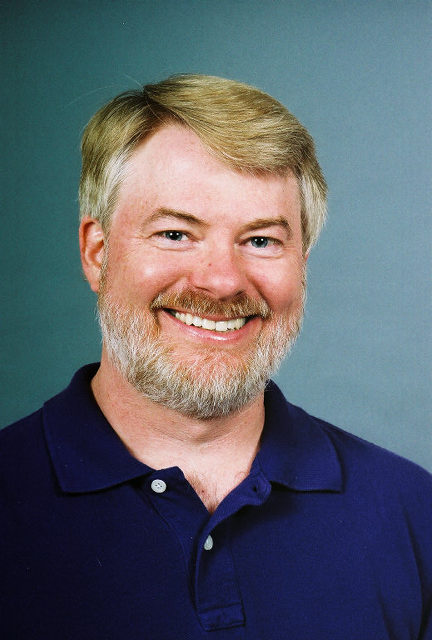
- Offutt in 2002
- Born: April 30, 1961 (age 65); Lexington, Kentucky, U.S.
- Education: Georgia Institute of Technology
- Scientific career
- Fields: Software engineering, computer science
- Workplaces: George Mason University, Clemson University
- Thesis: Automatic Test Data Generation (1988)
- Doctoral advisor: Richard DeMillo
- Website: cs.gmu.edu/~offutt/

Jeff Offutt is a professor of Software Engineering at the University at Albany, SUNY. His primary interests are software testing and analysis, web software engineering, and software evolution and change-impact analysis.

He is the author of Introduction to Software Testing with Paul Ammann published by Cambridge University Press. He is the editor-in-chief of Software Testing, Verification and Reliability with Robert M. Hierons. He also helped create the IEEE International Conference on Software Testing, Verification, and Reliability and was the first chair of its steering committee.

In 2019, Offutt received the Outstanding Faculty Award from the State Council of Higher Education for Virginia, the highest honor for faculty at Virginia's public and private colleges and universities. The award recognizes accomplishments in teaching, research, and public service. He won the Teaching Excellence Award, Teaching with Technology, from George Mason University in 2013.

Offutt is known for many fundamental contributions to the field of software testing, in particular mutation testing, model-based testing, bypass testing of web applications, and automatic test data generation.

Dr. Offutt received his undergraduate degree in mathematics and data processing in 1982 (double major) from Morehead State University, and master's (1985) and PhD (1988) in computer science from the Georgia Institute of Technology. He was on the faculty of Clemson University before joining George Mason in 1992.

He is the son of Andrew J. Offutt and brother of Chris Offutt. He is married to Jian and has three children, Stephanie, Joyce, and Andrew.
