= Mobilitalea =

Scientific classification
- Domain: Bacteria
- Kingdom: Bacillati
- Phylum: Bacillota
- Class: Clostridia
- Order: Eubacteriales
- Family: Lachnospiraceae
- Genus: Mobilitalea; Podosokorskaya et al. 2014

Type species
- Mobilitalea sibirica Podosokorskaya et al. 2014

Species
- M. sibirica

Genus of bacteria

Mobilitalea is a bacterial genus from the family of Lachnospiraceae with one known species (Mobilitalea sibirica).

== Phylogeny ==
The currently accepted taxonomy is based on the List of Prokaryotic names with Standing in Nomenclature (LPSN) and National Center for Biotechnology Information (NCBI)

16S rRNA based LTP_10_2024

- - Variimorphobacter saccharofermentans Rettenmaier et al. 2021
  - - Mobilitalea sibirica Podosokorskaya et al. 2014
    - - Anaerotaenia torta Ueki et al. 2016
      - - Herbinix
          - H. hemicellulosilytica Koeck et al. 2015
          - H. lupora Koeck, Hahnke & Zverlov 2016

120 marker proteins based GTDB 09-RS220

- Mobilitalea
  - - M. sibirica
    - Variimorphobacter saccharofermentans
  - - Herbinix hemicellulosilytica
    - Herbinix lupora

== See also ==
- List of bacterial orders
- List of bacteria genera
