= Butyrivibrio =

Scientific classification
- Domain: Bacteria
- Kingdom: Bacillati
- Phylum: Bacillota
- Class: Clostridia
- Order: Eubacteriales
- Family: Lachnospiraceae
- Genus: Butyrivibrio; Bryant and Small 1956

Type species
- Butyrivibrio fibrisolvens corrig. Bryant & Small 1956

Species
- B. fibrisolvens; B. hungatei; B. proteoclasticus; "Ca. B. umebia"

Synonyms
- Vibrio ("Butyrivibrio") (Bryant & Small 1956) Prévot 1961

Genus of bacteria

Butyrivibrio is a genus of bacteria in Class Clostridia. Bacteria of this genus are common in the gastrointestinal systems of many animals. Genus Butyrivibrio was first described by Bryant and Small (1956) as anaerobic, butyric acid-producing, curved rods (or vibroids). Butyrivibrio cells are small, typically 0.4 – 0.6 μm by 2 – 5 μm. They are motile, using a single polar or subpolar monotrichous flagellum. They are commonly found singly or in short chains but it is not unusual for them to form long chains. Despite historically being described as Gram-negative, their cell walls contain derivatives of teichoic acid, and electron microscopy indicates that bacteria of this genus have a Gram-positive cell wall type. It is thought that they appear Gram-negative when Gram stained because their cell walls thin to 12 to 18 nm as they reach stationary phase.

Butyrivibrio species are common in the rumens of ruminant animals such as cows, deer and sheep, where they are involved in a number of ruminal functions of agricultural importance in addition to butyrate production. These include fibre degradation, protein breakdown, biohydrogenation of lipids and the production of microbial inhibitors. Of particular importance to ruminant digestion, and therefore productivity, is their contribution to the degradation of plant structural carbohydrates, principally hemicellulose.

== Metabolism ==
Butyrivibrio species are metabolically versatile and are able to ferment a wide range of sugars and cellodextrins. Some strains have been reported to break down cellulose, although their ability to sustain growth on cellulose appears to be lost during in vitro culturing. Most isolates are amylolytic and are able to degrade xylan by producing xylanolytic and esterase enzymes. The induction of xylanase enzymes varies between strains; in group D1 strains (49, H17c, 12) xylanase expression appears to be constitutively expressed, while groups B1 (113) and C (CF3) are induced only by growth on xylan, and those of group B2 are induced by growth on xylan or arabinose.

A number of genes encoding glycoside hydrolases (GH) have been identified in Butyrivibrio species including endocellulase (GH family 5 and 9); β-Glucosidase (GH family 3); endoxylanase (GH family 10 and 11); β-Xylosidase (GH family 43); and α-Amylase (GH family 13) enzymes. Several carbohydrate binding modules (CBM) have also been identified that are predicted to bind glycogen (CBM family 48); xylan or chitin (CBM family 2); and starch (CBM family 26).

== Strains ==
The genus Butyrivibrio encompasses over 60 strains that were originally confined to the species Butyrivibrio fibrisolvens based on their phenotypic and metabolic characteristics. However, phylogenetic analyses based on 16S ribosomal RNA (rRNA) gene sequences has divided the genus Butyrivibrio into six families. These families include the rumen isolates Butyrivibrio fibrisolvens, B. hungateii, B. proteoclasticus, Pseudobutyrivibrio xylanivorans, and P. ruminis and the human isolate B. crossotus. The families B. fibrisolvens, B. crossotus, B. hungateii as well as B. proteoclasticus all belong to the Clostridium sub-cluster XIVa.

== Phylogeny ==
The currently accepted taxonomy is based on the List of Prokaryotic names with Standing in Nomenclature (LPSN) and National Center for Biotechnology Information (NCBI)

16S rRNA based LTP_10_2024

- Butyrivibrio
  - B. fibrisolvens corrig. Bryant & Small 1956
  - - B. hungatei Kopecny et al. 2003
    - B. proteoclasticus (Attwood, Reilly & Patel 1996) Moon et al. 2008

120 marker proteins based GTDB 09-RS220

- Butyrivibrio
  - B. fibrisolvens
  - - B. hungatei
    - B. proteoclasticus

== See also ==
- List of bacterial orders
- List of bacteria genera
- Roseburia
