= Anthropogastromicrobium =

Scientific classification
- Domain: Bacteria
- Kingdom: Bacillati
- Phylum: Bacillota
- Class: Clostridia
- Order: Eubacteriales
- Family: Lachnospiraceae
- Genus: Anthropogastromicrobium; Hitch et al. 2022
- Species: A. aceti

Binomial name
- Anthropogastromicrobium aceti Hitch et al. 2022

Species of bacterium

Anthropogastromicrobium aceti is a species of bacterium found in the human gut microbiome. Machine-learning based predictions based on its genome suggest that A. aceti is facultatively anaerobic and Gram-positive. It was first isolated from human feces. It is the only species in the genus Anthropogastromicrobium.
