= Hespellia =

Scientific classification
- Domain: Bacteria
- Kingdom: Bacillati
- Phylum: Bacillota
- Class: Clostridia
- Order: Eubacteriales
- Family: Lachnospiraceae
- Genus: Hespellia; Whitehead et al. 2004

Type species
- Hespellia stercorisuis Whitehead et al. 2004

Species
- H. porcina; H. stercorisuis

Genus of bacteria

Hespellia is a Gram-positive, strictly anaerobic, non-spore-forming and non-motile genus from the family of Lachnospiraceae.

== Phylogeny ==
The currently accepted taxonomy is based on the List of Prokaryotic names with Standing in Nomenclature (LPSN) and National Center for Biotechnology Information (NCBI)

16S rRNA based LTP_10_2024

- Hespellia
  - H. porcina Whitehead et al. 2004
  - H. stercorisuis Whitehead et al. 2004

120 marker proteins based GTDB 09-RS220

- Hespellia
  H. stercorisuis

== See also ==
- List of bacterial orders
- List of bacteria genera
