= Oribacterium =

Scientific classification
- Domain: Bacteria
- Kingdom: Bacillati
- Phylum: Bacillota
- Class: Clostridia
- Order: Eubacteriales
- Family: Lachnospiraceae
- Genus: Oribacterium; Carlier et al. 2004

Type species
- Oribacterium sinus Carlier et al. 2004

Species
- O. asaccharolyticum; O. parvum; O. sinus

Genus of bacteria

Oribacterium is a strictly anaerobic and non-spore-forming bacterial genus from the family of Lachnospiraceae.

== Phylogeny ==
The currently accepted taxonomy is based on the List of Prokaryotic names with Standing in Nomenclature (LPSN) and the National Center for Biotechnology Information (NCBI)

The cladograms show the three species with validly published names recognized by LPSN; placeholder species clusters in GTDB are omitted.

16S rRNA based LTP_10_2024

- Oribacterium
  - O. sinus Carlier et al. 2004
  - - O. asaccharolyticum Sizova et al. 2014
    - O. parvum Sizova et al. 2014

120 marker proteins based GTDB R11-RS232

- Oribacterium
  - O. sinus
  - - O. asaccharolyticum
    - O. parvum

== See also ==
- List of bacterial orders
- List of bacteria genera
