= Hungatella xylanolytica =

Scientific classification
- Domain: Bacteria
- Kingdom: Bacillati
- Phylum: Bacillota
- Class: Clostridia
- Order: Eubacteriales
- Family: Lachnospiraceae
- Genus: Hungatella
- Species: H. xylanolytica

Binomial name
- Hungatella xylanolytica (Scholten-Koerselman et al. 1988) García-López et al. 2020

Synonyms
- Bacteroides xylanolyticus

Species of bacterium

Hungatella xylanolytica is a xylanolytic bacterium from the genus Hungatella.
