= Lachnoanaerobaculum =

Scientific classification
- Domain: Bacteria
- Kingdom: Bacillati
- Phylum: Bacillota
- Class: Clostridia
- Order: Eubacteriales
- Family: Lachnospiraceae
- Genus: Lachnoanaerobaculum; Hedberg et al. 2012

Type species
- Lachnoanaerobaculum umeaense Hedberg et al. 2012

Species
- "L. gingivalis"; L. orale; L. saburreum; L. umeaense

Genus of bacteria

Lachnoanaerobaculum is a bacterial genus from the family Lachnospiraceae which typically occurs in the human mouth and intestine.

== Phylogeny ==
The currently accepted taxonomy is based on the List of Prokaryotic names with Standing in Nomenclature (LPSN) and National Center for Biotechnology Information (NCBI)

16S rRNA based LTP_10_2024

- Lachnoanaerobaculum
  - L. umeaense
  - - L. orale
    - L. saburreum

120 marker proteins based GTDB 09-RS220

- Lachnoanaerobaculum
  - - "L. gingivalis" Lim et al. 2019
    - L. umeaense Hedberg et al. 2012
  - - L. orale Hedberg et al. 2012
    - L. saburreum (Prévot 1966) Hedberg et al. 2012
