= Moryella =

Scientific classification
- Domain: Bacteria
- Kingdom: Bacillati
- Phylum: Bacillota
- Class: Clostridia
- Order: Eubacteriales
- Family: Lachnospiraceae
- Genus: Moryella; Carlier et al. 2007

Type species
- Moryella indoligenes Carlier, K'ouas & Han 2007

Species
- M. indoligenes

Genus of bacteria

Moryella is a Gram-positive, non-spore-forming, strictly anaerobic and non-motile bacterial genus from the family of Lachnospiraceae with one known species (Moryella indoligenes). Moryella indoligenes has been isolated from clinical specimens.

== See also ==
- List of bacterial orders
- List of bacteria genera
