= Enterocloster =

Scientific classification
- Domain: Bacteria
- Kingdom: Bacillati
- Phylum: Bacillota
- Class: Clostridia
- Order: Eubacteriales
- Family: Lachnospiraceae
- Genus: Enterocloster; Haas and Blanchard 2020

Type species
- Enterocloster clostridioformis (Burri & Ankersmit 1906) Haas & Blanchard 2020

Species
- "E. alcoholdehydrogenati"; E. aldenensis; E. asparagiformis; E. bolteae; E. citroniae; E. clostridioformis; "Ca. E. excrementigallinarum"; "Ca. E. excrementipullorum"; "Ca. E. faecavium"; E. lavalensis

Genus of bacteria

Enterocloster is a genus of anaerobic bacteria. Species in Enterocloster were historically ordered in the genera Lachnoclostridium or Clostridium before advances in phylogenetics supported formation of a new genus.

== Phylogeny ==
The currently accepted taxonomy is based on the List of Prokaryotic names with Standing in Nomenclature (LPSN) and National Center for Biotechnology Information (NCBI)

16S rRNA based LTP_10_2024

- - Clostridium porci
  - - Enterocloster
      - - E. citroniae
        - - E. bolteae
          - E. clostridioformis
      - - E. aldenensis
        - - E. asparagiformis
          - E. lavalensis

120 marker proteins based GTDB 09-RS220

- Enterocloster
  - - - "Ca. E. excrementigallinarum" Gilroy et al. 2021
      - "Ca. E. faecavium" Gilroy et al. 2021
    - - E. asparagiformis (Mohan et al. 2007) Haas & Blanchard 2020
      - E. lavalensis (Domingo et al. 2009) Haas & Blanchard 2020
  - - - "E. alcoholdehydrogenati" Oikawa et al. 2023
      - "Ca. E. excrementipullorum" Gilroy et al. 2021
    - - Clostridium porci Wylensek et al. 2021
      - - - E. bolteae (Song et al. 2003) Haas & Blanchard 2020
          - E. clostridioformis (Burri & Ankersmit 1906) Haas & Blanchard 2020
        - - E. citroniae (Warren et al. 2007) Haas & Blanchard 2020
          - - E. aldenensis corrig. (Warren et al. 2007) Haas & Blanchard 2020
            - "Lachnoclostridium pacaense" Pham et al. 2017

== See also ==
- List of bacterial orders
- List of bacteria genera
