= Syntrophococcus =

Scientific classification
- Domain: Bacteria
- Kingdom: Bacillati
- Phylum: Bacillota
- Class: Clostridia
- Order: Eubacteriales
- Family: Lachnospiraceae
- Genus: Syntrophococcus; Krumholz and Bryant 1986
- Species: S. sucromutans

Binomial name
- Syntrophococcus sucromutans Krumholz and Bryant 1986

Species of bacterium

Syntrophococcus sucromutans is a Gram-negative strictly anaerobic chemoorganotrophic Bacillota. It is the only species in the genus Syntrophococcus. These bacteria can be found forming small chains in the habitat where it was first isolated, the rumen of cows. It is the type strain of genus Syntrophococcus and it has an uncommon one-carbon metabolic pathway, forming acetate from formate as a product of sugar oxidation.

== Name and discovery ==
The genus name Syntrophococcus is combination of Greek terms: syn, meaning "together", trophos, meaning "feeder", and kokkos, meaning "berry". The species name sucromutans is a combination of Neo-Latin sucro, referring to any sugar, and Latin mutans, meaning "changing".

Syntrophococcus sucromutans was first isolated by Krumholz and Bryant from the rumen of a steer. They made a basal medium consisting of 5% rumen fluid and bicarbonate buffer incubated in 4:1 N_{2}:CO_{2} conditions. The researchers were looking to find a bacterium that demethoxylated phenolic acids in the gut of ruminants, and this species was found to be the most prevalent prokaryote in the rumen to do such a process.

== Microbiology ==
=== Phylogenetics and genetics ===
Because it is an anaerobic coccus that stains Gram negative, S. sucromutans was originally classified into the family Veillonellaceae. Further 16S rRNA gene analysis has shown that the species belongs in the family Lachnospiraceae in phylum Bacillota. S. sucromutans is the only member of its genus with Eubacterium cellulosolvens as its closest described relative.

The type strain, ATCC 43584 or DSM 3224, has a G+C content of 52%.

=== Growth ===
Syntrophococcus sucromutans is a mesophile with a growth optimal temperature ranging from 35-42 °C and a growth range of 30-44 °C. The pH range for this Bacillota is close to neutral, 6.0-7.6, and will optimally grow in a slightly acidic environment, such as the rumen of a cow, at pH 6.4. Growth should be seen within 3 to 4 weeks if the above medium containing ruminal fluid is used. This complex medium provides it with all the nutrients necessary for optimal growth such as a mixture of vitamins, minerals, and trace metals. The main compounds that S. sucromutans must obtain from such ruminal fluid are phospholipids. It is even able to thrive without a ruminal fluid supplement if provided with phospholipids and fatty acids via a preparation such as 60% pure phosphatidylcholine.

=== Morphology ===
This species of coccus stains Gram-negative, is non-motile, cannot form spores, and forms short chains. Its size ranges from 1.0 to 1.3 μm in diameter.

=== Pathogenicity ===
Pathogenicity has not been reported in this organism to date. As such it is classified as a BSL-1 organism by the ATCC.

== Metabolism ==
This chemoorganotrophic anaerobe utilizes various sugars as electron donors to produce carbon dioxide and acetate through some rare metabolic processes. The main electron donors include carbohydrates such as pyruvate, glucose, fructose, galactose, maltose, cellobiose, lactose, arabinose, maltose, ribose, xylose, salicin, and esculin, making it well adapted to a habitat where complex organic compounds are being degraded, such as the rumen of a cow.

This organism actually has three major electron acceptors: formate, methoxymonobenzenoids, or methanogens. Its first option is the reduction of formate to acetate, giving S. sucromutans its title as an acetogen. The unique aspect of its acetate production is that it can synthesize many of these organic products from one-carbon compounds. Another set of electron acceptors consists of the methoxyl groups on benzenoid compounds, converting those groups into hydroxyl groups. Below is a table of potential electron acceptors and to what S. sucromutans reduces them. Its electron acceptors were characterized by its discoverers Krumholz and Bryant, who used ultraviolet absorbance to measure caffeate disappearance, thin layer chromatography to identify benzenoids, and the phenol sulphuric method for determining carbohydrate content. Its third option is to donate these terminal electrons to a methanogen such as Methanobrevibacter smithii by utilizing hydrogen, as H_{2}, or formate as an electron carrier.

electron acceptor	reduced product
formate	acetate
caffeate	hydrocaffeate
ferulate	caffeate
vanillin	protocatechuic aldehyde

Syntrophococcus sucromutans can only grow utilizing sugars and pyruvate if the hydrogen partial pressure is maintained at a low value. In addition, it requires ruminal fluid in order to maintain optimal growth. The complex and diverse system within an animal's ruminal biome provides a steady nutrient supply from the host's breakdown of food and the processes of other microbes.

== Ecology ==
Syntrophococcus sucromutans is the most numerous ruminal bacteria in its environment that demethylates methoxy groups of monoaromatic compounds. Similar to many microbes that live within the rumen of grazing hosts, S. sucromutans depends on the steady supply of nutrients from the animal's breakdown of food or the products of other neighboring microbes.

Krumholz and Bryant found that S. sucromutans grew best in a coculture with fructose, formate, and Methanobrevibacter smithii. The fact that it grew better in a coculture than even by itself with these nutrients demonstrates further that this organism is well adapted to a complex microbial community.

In addition, S. sucromutans was found to be a dominant OTU in the microbiomes of Australia's macropods. This information was obtained by sampling the foregut's bacterial communities of twenty grazing macropods. The fermentative properties of macropods' foreguts are similar to those of the rumen of ruminants. The foregut community samples were then sequenced via 454-amplicon pyrosequencing. After sequencing, the 16S rRNA gene and its V3/V4 region were specifically analyzed in order to obtain the present OTUs. In addition to Ruminococcaceae, Bacteroidales, and Prevotella spp., S. sucromutans was found to be one of eleven prominent OTUs present.

== Industrial applications ==
The earth's growing human population causes the production of large amounts of biological wastes, or biomass. Biogas plants play a key role in converting such wastes into "biogas" which can later be converted into usable energy. Through utilizing a wide variety of bacterial and archaeal metabolic processes, biogas plants take biological wastes and change them into chemicals such as methane, carbon dioxide, water, nitrogen, hydrogen sulfide, and oxygen. S. sucromutans can often be found within these microbial communities carrying out the metabolic function of acetogenesis. This data can be obtained through sampling the microbial community of a biogas plant over a couple years. PCR denaturing gradient gel electrophoresis is used to identify the 16S rRNA, and then the sequences are run through 16S rDNA reconstruction libraries.
