= Ruminococcus bromii =

Scientific classification
- Domain: Bacteria
- Kingdom: Bacillati
- Phylum: Bacillota
- Class: Clostridia
- Order: Eubacteriales
- Family: Oscillospiraceae
- Genus: Ruminococcus
- Species: R. bromii

Binomial name
- Ruminococcus bromii Moore et al. 1972 (Approved Lists 1980)

Species of bacterium

Ruminococcus bromii is an anoxic, Gram-positive, non-spore-forming bacterium found in the human gut. It has a coccus shape and is non-motile. It is considered a highly important part of the gut microbiome, being involved in the digestion of carbohydrates, particularly resistant starches. Bacteria in the genus Ruminococcaceae are thought to comprise between 10 and 25% of the gut microbiota of healthy humans. The type strain of the species is ATCC 27255.

== Role in digesting starches ==
R. bromii is notable for its role in digesting resistant starches to produce ethanol, acetate and formate. It contains genes encoding starch-digesting enzymes. Type II resistant starch, defined by its granular structure which resists the action of digestive enzymes, has been linked to elevated levels of R. bromii in the gut. The proportion of R. bromii in the gut is linked to the level of Type II resistant starches in the diet. R. bromii prevalence in the gut decreases if more animal-based foods are consumed. The hydrolysis of starches by R. bromii produces sugars which may be used by other bacteria in the gut microbiome, stimulating their growth.
