= Martin Woodward =

British computer scientist (1948–2006)

Dr Martin R. Woodward (28 May 1948 – 27 October 2006) was a British computer scientist who made leading contributions in the field of in software testing.

Martin Woodward was an academic in the Department of Computer Science at the University of Liverpool in England. As part of his leading role in software testing, for 13 years, until shortly before his death, Woodward was the Chief Editor of the journal Software Testing, Verification & Reliability (STVR), a major international journal in the field of software testing.

Woodward undertook software testing research in areas such as mutation testing, maturity models, testability, etc.
