= Lactonifactor =

Scientific classification
- Domain: Bacteria
- Kingdom: Bacillati
- Phylum: Bacillota
- Class: Clostridia
- Order: Eubacteriales
- Family: Lachnospiraceae
- Genus: Lactonifactor; Clavel et al. 2007

Type species
- Lactonifactor longoviformis Clavel et al. 2007

Species
- "L. hominis"; L. longoviformis

Genus of bacteria

Lactonifactor is a Gram-positive and anaerobic bacterial genus from the family of Clostridiaceae with one known species (Lactonifactor longoviformis). Lactonifactor longoviformis has been isolated from the human feces.

== See also ==
- List of bacterial orders
- List of bacteria genera
