= Clostridium methoxybenzovorans =

Scientific classification
- Domain: Bacteria
- Kingdom: Bacillati
- Phylum: Bacillota
- Class: Clostridia
- Order: Eubacteriales
- Family: Clostridiaceae
- Genus: Clostridium
- Species: C. methoxybenzovorans

Binomial name
- Clostridium methoxybenzovorans Mechichi et al. 1999

Type strain
- ATCC 700855, DSM 12182, SR3

Species of bacterium

Clostridium methoxybenzovorans is a species of gram-positive, strictly anaerobic and spore-forming bacterium from the genus Clostridium which has been isolated from olive mill wastewater from Sfax in Tunisia. C. methoxybenzovorans is able to grow on a variety of carbon sources including carbohydrates, organic compounds, and alcohol (methanol).
