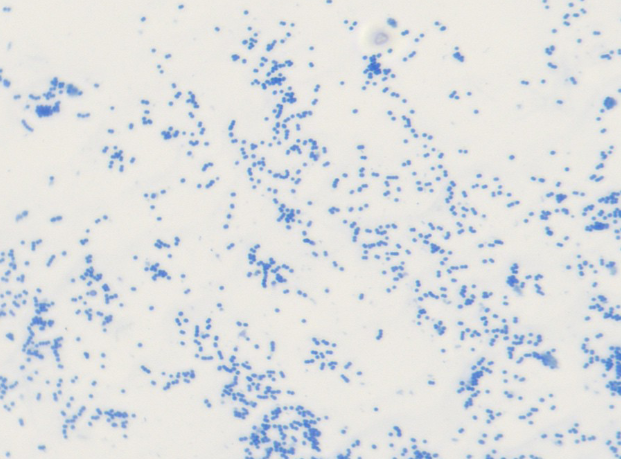

Scientific classification
- Domain: Bacteria
- Kingdom: Bacillati
- Phylum: Bacillota
- Class: Clostridia
- Order: Eubacteriales
- Family: Oscillospiraceae
- Genus: Ruminococcus; Sijpesteijn 1948

Type species
- Ruminococcus flavefaciens Sijpesteijn 1948

Species
- Ruminococcus albus; Ruminococcus bovis; Ruminococcus bromii; Ruminococcus callidus; Ruminococcus champanellensis; Ruminococcus flavefaciens; Ruminococcus gauvreauii; Ruminococcus lactaris; Ruminococcus torques; Ruminococcus turbiniformis

= Ruminococcus =

Genus of bacteria

Ruminococcus is a genus of bacteria in the class Clostridia. They are anaerobic, Gram-positive gut microbes. One or more species in this genus are found in significant numbers in the human gut microbiota. The type species is R. flavefaciens. As usual, bacteria taxonomy is in flux, with Clostridia being paraphyletic, and some erroneous members of Ruminococcus being reassigned to a new genus Blautia on the basis of 16S rRNA gene sequences.

One of the most highly cited papers involving the genus Ruminococcus is a paper describing interspecies hydrogen transfer between Ruminococcus albus and Wolinella succinogenes.

In 1972, Ruminococcus bromii was reportedly found in the human gut, which was the first of several species discovered. They may play a role in plant cell wall breakdown in the colon.

One study found that R. albus, R. callidus, and R. bromii are less abundant in people with inflammatory bowel disease. Ruminococcus are also less abundant in patients with Parkinson's disease and amyotrophic lateral sclerosis. R. gnavus is associated with Crohn's disease.

== Phylogeny ==
The currently accepted taxonomy is based on the List of Prokaryotic names with Standing in Nomenclature (LPSN) and National Center for Biotechnology Information (NCBI)

120 marker proteins based GTDB 09-RS220

- Ruminococcus
  - R. champanellensis Chassard et al. 2012
  - - R. callidus Holdeman & Moore 1974
    - R. flavefaciens Sijpesteijn 1948
