= Roseburia =

Scientific classification
- Domain: Bacteria
- Kingdom: Bacillati
- Phylum: Bacillota
- Class: Clostridia
- Order: Eubacteriales
- Family: Lachnospiraceae
- Genus: Roseburia; Stanton & Savage 1983

Type species
- Roseburia cecicola Stanton & Savage 1983

Species
- R. amylophila; R. cecicola; R. difficilis; R. faecis; R. hominis; R. intestinalis; R. inulinivorans; R. porci; R. zhanii

Genus of anaerobic bacteria

Roseburia is a genus of obligately anaerobic, butyrate-producing bacteria in the family Lachnospiraceae. Members of the genus occur in the gastrointestinal tracts of mammals, and several species are common constituents of the human gut microbiota. Cultured species are generally saccharolytic, motile rods that ferment carbohydrates and form butyrate as a major product.

== Taxonomy ==
The type species, Roseburia cecicola, was isolated from the cecum of a mouse. The generic name honours the American microbiologist Theodor Rosebury, who studied microorganisms associated with humans.

The List of Prokaryotic names with Standing in Nomenclature recognizes nine species with validly published and correct names in the genus.

== Biology and metabolism ==
Described Roseburia cells are straight or slightly curved rods. Many strains are motile by means of multiple flagella. The Gram-stain reaction has been reported as positive, negative, or variable among cultured strains, despite the phylogenetic placement of the genus within the phylum Bacillota.

Species differ in their capacity to use dietary carbohydrates. Comparative genomic analysis has identified differences in carbohydrate-active enzymes and biosynthetic pathways among species, which may contribute to their occupation of different ecological niches in the colon. Roseburia intestinalis, for example, can act as a primary degrader of dietary β-mannans, while Roseburia inulinivorans can use inulin.

During carbohydrate fermentation, some strains consume acetate while producing butyrate. Butyrate is used as an energy source by colonic epithelial cells and participates in metabolic and immune signalling in the intestine.

== Research ==
Differences in the relative abundance of Roseburia have been reported in observational studies of inflammatory bowel disease, colorectal cancer, and metabolic disorders.

R. intestinalis has been investigated as a potential live biotherapeutic. Administration of the bacterium reduced inflammatory pathology and altered immune responses in experimental models of colitis, but these findings were obtained in preclinical systems.

The relative abundance of R. inulinivorans was positively associated with several measures of muscle strength in human cohorts. Oral supplementation with the species also increased forelimb grip strength in antibiotic-treated mice and was accompanied by changes in amino-acid availability, muscle metabolism, and muscle-fibre composition.

== See also ==
- List of bacterial orders
- List of bacteria genera
