= Lachnoclostridium =

Scientific classification
- Domain: Bacteria
- Kingdom: Bacillati
- Phylum: Bacillota
- Class: Clostridia
- Order: Eubacteriales
- Family: Lachnospiraceae
- Genus: Lachnoclostridium; Yutin and Galperin 2013 (invalid)

Type species
- "Lachnoclostridium phytofermentans" (Warnick, Methe & Leschine 2002) Yutin & Galperin 2013

Species
- "Ca. L. avicola"; "L. edouardi"; "L. phytofermentans"; "Ca. L. pullistercoris"; "Ca. L. stercoravium"; "Ca. L. stercorigallinarum"; "Ca. L. stercoripullorum"; "L. urinimassiliense"

Genus of bacteria

Lachnoclostridium is an obsolete genus of bacteria in the family Lachnospiraceae. All members have been moved to either Enterocloster or Clostridium (see LPSN)

== Phylogeny ==
The currently accepted taxonomy is based on the List of Prokaryotic names with Standing in Nomenclature (LPSN) and National Center for Biotechnology Information (NCBI)

120 marker proteins based GTDB 09-RS220

- - "Lachnoclostridium phytofermentans" (Warnick, Methe & Leschine 2002) Yutin & Galperin 2013

- Lachnoclostridium species‑group 2
  - - "L. edouardi" Traore et al. 2017
    - "Ca. L. stercoravium" Gilroy et al. 2021
  - - "Ca. L. stercoripullorum" Gilroy et al. 2021
    - - "Ca. L. pullistercoris" Gilroy et al. 2021
      - - "Ca. L. avicola" Gilroy et al. 2021
        - "Ca. L. stercorigallinarum" Gilroy et al. 2021

== See also ==
- List of bacterial orders
- List of bacteria genera
