= Cellobiose epimerase =

cellobiose epimerase

Identifiers
- EC no.: 5.1.3.11
- CAS no.: 37318-37-9

Databases
- IntEnz: IntEnz view
- BRENDA: BRENDA entry
- ExPASy: NiceZyme view
- KEGG: KEGG entry
- MetaCyc: metabolic pathway
- PRIAM: profile
- PDB structures: RCSB PDB PDBe PDBsum
- Gene Ontology: AmiGO / QuickGO
Search
- PMC: articles
- PubMed: articles
- NCBI: proteins

In enzymology a cellobiose epimerase (EC 5.1.3.11) is an enzyme that catalyzes the chemical reaction

cellobiose $\rightleftharpoons$ D-glucosyl-D-mannose

Hence, this enzyme has one substrate, cellobiose, and one product, D-glucosyl-D-mannose.

This enzyme belongs to the family of isomerases, specifically those racemases and epimerases acting on carbohydrates and their derivatives. The systematic name of this enzyme class is cellobiose 2-epimerase. Enzymes like these can produce a more rapid syndrome that can speed up the process of many life-threatening diseases such as Necrotizing Fasciitis.
