= Lachnospiraceae =

Scientific classification
- Domain: Bacteria
- Kingdom: Bacillati
- Phylum: Bacillota
- Class: Clostridia
- Order: Eubacteriales
- Family: Lachnospiraceae; Rainey 2010

Genera
- See text

Family of bacteria

The Lachnospiraceae are a family of obligately anaerobic, variably spore-forming bacteria in the order Eubacteriales that ferment diverse plant polysaccharides to short-chain fatty acids (butyrate, acetate) and alcohols (ethanol). These bacteria are among the most abundant taxa in the rumen and the human gut microbiota. Members of this family may protect against colon cancer in humans by producing butyric acid. Lachnospiraceae have been found to contribute to diabetes in genetically susceptible (ob/ob) germ-free mice.

== Phylogeny ==
The currently accepted taxonomy is based on the List of Prokaryotic names with Standing in Nomenclature (LPSN) and National Center for Biotechnology Information (NCBI)

16S rRNA based LTP_10_2024

- Lachnospiraceae

120 marker proteins based GTDB 09-RS220

- Lachnospiraceae
  - - - Catonella Moore & Moore 1994
      - - "Ca. Caccomorpha" Gilroy et al. 2021
        - "Lachnoclostridium" Yutin & Galperin 2013
    - - - Eubacterium xylanophilum van Gylswyk & van der Toorn 1985
        - - Jutongia Liu et al. 2022
          - Butyribacter Zou et al. 2021
      - - Clostridium_AI
        - - Velocimicrobium Wylensek et al. 2021
          - - Anaerosporobacter Jeong et al. 2007
            - - Mobilisporobacter Mbengue et al. 2016
              - - Anaeromicropila Ueki et al. 2023
                - - Mobilitalea Podosokorskaya et al. 2014
                  - Anaerocolumna Ueki et al. 2016
  - - - - - Coprococcus catus Holdeman & Moore 1974
          - - Frisingicoccus Lagkouvardos et al. 2016
            - "Ca. Onthocola" Gilroy et al. 2021
        - - "Ca. Scybalocola faecipullorum" Gilroy et al. 2021
          - Catenibacillus Braune & Blaut 2018
      - - - - Eubacterium ruminantium Bryant 1959
            - "Wujia" Liu et al. 2021
          - Coprococcus Holdeman & Moore 1974
        - - "Ca. Scybalomonas" Gilroy et al. 2021
          - - Anaerobutyricum Shetty et al. 2018
            - - "Ca. Fimousia" Gilroy et al. 2021
              - Anaerostipes Schwiertz et al. 2002
    - - - - - Bovifimicola Hitch et al. 2025
            - - Parasporobacterium Lomans et al. 2004
              - Eubacterium_S & G
          - - - Eshraghiella Fatahi-Bafghi 2024
              - Falcatimonas Watanabe et al. 2016
            - - Clostridium fimetarium Kotsyurbenko et al. 1997
              - - Bacteroides pectinophilus Jensen & Canale-Parola 1987
                - Lachnospira Bryant & Small 1956
        - - - - Anthropogastromicrobium Hitch et al. 2022
              - - Cuneatibacter Lagkouvardos et al. 2016
                - "Ca. Fimimorpha" Gilroy et al. 2021
            - - - "Ca. Pseudolachnospira" Glendinning et al. 2020
                - Hominifimenecus Afrizal et al. 2023
              - - "Ca. Paralachnospira sangeri" Glendinning et al. 2020
                - Lientehia Abdugheni et al. 2023
          - - - - "Ca. Avilachnospira" Gilroy et al. 2021
                - Oribacterium Carlier et al. 2004
              - - Moryella Carlier, K'ouas & Han 2007
                - - Johnsonella Moore & Moore 1994
                  - Lachnoanaerobaculum Hedberg et al. 2012
            - - - - Alitiscatomonas Hitch et al. 2022
                  - "Ca. Copromonas" Gilroy et al. 2021 non Dobell 1908
                - - "Ca. Ventrisoma" Gilroy et al. 2021
                  - - Clostridium_R
                    - Otoolea Afrizal et al. 2023
              - - Lachnoclostridium_A
                - - - "Ca. Caccovicinus" Gilroy et al. 2021
                    - Enterocloster Haas & Blanchard 2020
                  - - Brotaphodocola Afrizal et al. 2023
                    - - "Ca. Hungatella pullicola" Gilroy et al. 2021
                      - - Hungatella Kaur et al. 2014
                        - Lacrimispora Haas & Blanchard 2020
      - - - Acetitomaculum Greening & Leedle 1995
          - - - Diplocloster Chaplin et al. 2022
              - - - Anaerosacchariphilus Kim et al. 2019
                  - "Ca. Merdenecus" Gilroy et al. 2021
                - - Anaerobium Patil et al. 2015
                  - Lachnotalea Jarzembowska et al. 2016
            - - - Hominiventricola Afrizal et al. 2023
                - Laedolimicola Hitch et al. 2022
              - - - "Ca. Merdiplasma" Gilroy et al. 2021
                  - "Ca. Choladousia" Gilroy et al. 2021
                - - - Marvinbryantia Wolin et al. 2008
                    - Muricoprocola Hitch et al. 2022
                  - - - Murimonas Klaring et al. 2015
                      - Robinsoniella Cotta et al. 2009
                    - - "Ca. Hominisplanchenecus murintestinalis" Afrizal et al. 2022
                      - - Hominisplanchenecus Afrizal et al. 2023
                        - "Ca. Limivivens" Gilroy et al. 2021
        - - - - - - Shuttleworthella Deshmukh & Oren 2024 [Shuttleworthia]
                  - "Ca. Weimeria" Scarborough et al. 2020
                - - - "Ca. Pullilachnospira gallistercoris" Gilroy et al. 2021
                    - Pararoseburia Abdugheni et al. 2022
                  - Pseudobutyrivibrio van Gylswyk, Hippe & Rainey 1996
              - - - Eubacterium oxidoreducens corrig. Krumholz & Bryant 1986
                  - - Eubacterium ramulus Moore, Johnson &Holdeman 1976
                    - Brotonthovivens Hitch et al. 2022
                - - "Petralouisia" Afrizal et al. 2022
                  - - Eubacterium plexicaudatum Wilkins, Fulghum & Wilkins 1974
                    - - Roseburia_C
                      - - Roseburia zhanii Liu et al. 2022
                        - - Roseburia Stanton & Savage 1983
                          - - - Lachnobacterium Whitford et al. 2001
                              - "Roseburia porci" Wylensek et al. 2020
                            - Agathobacter Rosero et al. 2016
            - - Butyrivibrio Bryant & Small 1956
              - - - Suilimivivens Hitch et al. 2021
                  - Acetatifactor Pfeiffer et al. 2013
                - - Kineothrix Haas & Blanchard 2017
                  - - Gallintestinimicrobium Hitch et al. 2022
                    - Eisenbergiella Amir et al. 2014
          - - - - Suipraeoptans corrig. Wylensek et al. 2021
                - "Aequitasia" Vera-Ponce de Leon et al. 2022
              - - - Claveliimonas Hisatomi et al. 2023
                  - - Extibacter Lagkouvardos et al. 2017
                    - - - Dorea Taras et al. 2002
                        - - Dorea hominis Liu et al. 2022
                          - "Massilistercora" Tall et al. 2020
                      - - - "Dorea phocaeensis" Takakura et al. 2019
                          - Merdimonas Seo et al. 2017
                        - - - Clostridium scindens Morris et al. 1985
                            - Sporofaciens Rasmussen et al. 2021
                          - Dorea_A
                - - "Bariatricus" Bessis et al. 2016
                  - - - Faecalimonas Sakamoto, Iino & Ohkuma 2017
                      - Sellimonas Seo et al. 2016
                    - - Hespellia Whitehead et al. 2004
                      - - Mediterraneibacter butyricigenes Kim et al. 2019
                        - - - Ruminococcus_B
                            - - "Luxibacter" Naud et al. 2021
                              - Muricomes Lagkouvardos et al. 2016 [incl. Faecalicatena]
                          - - Schaedlerella Soh et al. 2019
                            - Mediterraneibacter Togo et al. 2019
            - - Porcincola Wylensek et al. 2021
              - - Chordicoccus Gaffney et al. 2023
                - - "Ca. Alectryocaccobium" Gilroy et al. 2021
                  - - Bilifractor Wylensek et al. 2021
                    - - "Ca. Scatomonas" Gilroy et al. 2021
                      - - Novisyntrophococcus Chai et al. 2021
                        - - Fusicatenibacter Takada et al. 2013
                          - - "Ca. Egerieimonas faecigallinarum" Gilroy et al. 2021
                            - - - "Ca. Egerieimonas" Gilroy et al. 2021
                                - - "Ca. Pullilachnospira" Gilroy et al. 2021
                                  - Oliverpabstia Wylensek et al. 2021
                              - - Ruminococcus_G
                                - - - Lactonifactor Clavel et al. 2007
                                    - Blautia Liu et al. 2008
                                  - Blautia_A

Unassinged genera:

- "Africanella" Alou, Fournier & Raoult 2016 non Vermeij & Houart, 1999
- Anaerolentibacter Yan et al. 2024
- Anaerotaenia Ueki et al. 2016
- Chakrabartyella Pardesi et al. 2023
- "Ca. Colinaster" Gilroy et al. 2022
- "Ca. Darwinimomas" Gilroy et al. 2022
- "Ca. Epulonipiscioides" Ngugi et al. 2017 corrig. Oren et al. 2020
- "Ca. Equihabitans" Gilroy et al. 2022
- Fusibacillus Bai et al. 2024 non Pribram 1929
- "Fusimonas" Kusada et al. 2017
- "Gluceribacter" corrig. Kawata et al. 2021
- "Ca. Hippenecus" Gilroy et al. 2022
- Hoministercoradaptatus Hitch et al. 2022
- Howardella Cook et al. 2007
- "Ca. Lachnocurva" Holm et al. 2020
- "Maccoya" Hitch et al. 2024
- "Ca. Merdinaster" Gilroy et al. 2022
- "Ca. Minthocola" Gilroy et al. 2022
- "Naizhengia" Huang et al. 2024
- "Sakamotonia" Hitch et al. 2024
- "Sanxizhangella" Huang et al. 2024
- Suonthocola Hitch et al. 2022
- Sporobacterium Mechichi et al. 1999
- Syntrophococcus Krumholz & Bryant 1986
- "Weimerbacter" Scarborough et al. 2019
- "Yonghella" Huang et al. 2024
