= List of bacteria genera =

This article lists the genera of the bacteria. The currently accepted taxonomy is based on the List of Prokaryotic names with Standing in Nomenclature (LPSN) and National Center for Biotechnology Information (NCBI). However many taxonomic names are taken from the GTDB release 08-RS214 (28 April 2023).

== Phyla ==
Superphylum	Phylum	Authority	Synonyms
Parakaryota			Myojin parakaryote
	"Qinglongiota"	Zhang et al. 2022	
	"Salinosulfoleibacteria"	Tazi et al. 2006	
	"Teskebacteria"	Dojka 1998	WS1
Bacillati	"Sysuimicrobiota"	Liu et al. 2024	CSP1-3
Bacillati	Deinococcota	Weisburg, Giovannoni & Woes 2021	
Bacillati	Chloroflexota	Whitman et al. 2018	"Dormiibacterota"; "Thermomicrobiota"
Bacillati	"Elulimicrobiota"	corrig. Rodriguez-R et al. 2020	
Bacillati	Minisyncoccota	Rinke et al. 2013	[77 phyla]
Bacillati	Armatimonadota	corrig. Tamaki et al. 2021	OP10; "Abditibacteriota" (FBP); "Fervidibacteria"
Bacillati	Vulcanimicrobiota	Yabe et al. 2024	WPS2; Eremiobacterota; "Palusbacterota"
Bacillati	Actinomycetota	Salam et al. 2020	High G+C Gram-positive bacteria
Bacillati	"Halanaerobiota"		Bacillota F
Bacillati	Bacillota_G		
Bacillati	"Selenobacteria"	Cavalier-Smith 1992	Bacillota C
Bacillati	"Desulfotomaculota"	Watanabe, Fukui & Kuever 2019	Bacillota B
Bacillati	Bacillota_E		
Bacillati	Bacillota_D		
Bacillati	Bacillota	Whitman et al. 2018	Mycoplasmatota
Bacillati	"Clostridiota"	Misery et al. 2025	Bacillota_A
Bacillati	"Margulisiibacteriota"	corrig. Anantharaman et al. 2016	"Saganbacteria"
Bacillati	Cyanobacteriota	Oren, Mares & Rippka 2022	Blue-green algae; "Blackallbacteria"; "Coralsanbacteria"; "Melainobacteriota"; "Tanganyikabacteria"
Thermotogati	"Zhurongbacterota"	Leng et al. 2023	
Thermotogati	"Xuanmingibacterota"	Zhang et al. 2026	
Thermotogati	"Yinglongibacterota"	Zhang et al. 2026	
Thermotogati	"Gonggongibacterota"	Zhang et al. 2026	
Thermotogati	Dictyoglomerota	corrig. Patel 2021	
Thermotogati	Thermodesulfobiota	Frolov et al. 2022	
Thermotogati	Coprothermobacterota	Paven et al. 2018	"Lithacetigenota"
Thermotogati	Caldisericota	corrig. Mori et al. 2021	OP5; "Cryosericota"
Thermotogati	Synergistota	corrig. Jumas-Bilak et al. 2021	"Aminanaerobiota"
Thermotogati	"Bipolaricaulota"	Hao et al. 2018	KB1; "Acetothermia" (OP1); "Fraseribacteriota" (RIF31)
Thermotogati	Thermotogota	corrig. Reysenbach 2021	
Fusobacteriati	Fusobacteriota	Garrity & Holt 2021	
Pseudomonadati	"Muiribacteriota"	corrig. Barnum et al. 2018	"Walliibacteriota" corrig. Anantharaman et al. 2016; "Rifleibacteriota" corrig. Anantharaman et al. 2016
Pseudomonadati	"Macinerneyibacteriota"	corrig. Yadav et al. 2020	
Pseudomonadati	"Sumerlaeota"	Kadnikov et al. 2018	BRC1
Pseudomonadati	"Lindowiibacteriota"	corrig. Anantharaman et al. 2016	RIF2
Pseudomonadati	"Salsurabacteriota"	Gutiérrez-Preciado et al. 2024	
Pseudomonadati	Spirochaetota	Garrity & Holt 2021	
Pseudomonadati	"Poribacteriota"	corrig. Fiesler et al. 2004	
Pseudomonadati	"Oederibacteriota"	Sereika et al. 2025	"Firestoneibacteriota" (RIF1); "Goldiibacteriota"; "Muellerivitota"
Pseudomonadati	"Aerophobota"	corrig. Rinke et al. 2013	CD12
Pseudomonadati	Atribacterota	Katayama et al. 2020	JS1; "Caldatribacteriota"
Pseudomonadati	"Desantisiibacteriota"	corrig. Probst et al. 2017	
Pseudomonadati	"Ryujiniota"	Sun et al. 2025	
Pseudomonadati	"Shingomicrobia"	Vigneron et al. 2025	
Pseudomonadati	Elusimicrobiota	Geissinger et al. 2021	TG1
Pseudomonadati	"Ratteibacteriota"	corrig. Probst et al. 2018	
Pseudomonadati	JAHJDO01		
Pseudomonadati	"Omnitrophota"	corrig. Rinke et al. 2013	OP3
Pseudomonadati	"Abyssobacterota"	corrig. Momper et al. 2017	
Pseudomonadati	"Hydrogenedentota"	corrig. Rinke et al. 2013	NKB19
Pseudomonadati	Planctomycetota	Garrity & Holt 2021	"Saltatorellota"
Pseudomonadati	"Auribacterota"	corrig. Momper et al. 2017	SURF-CP-2
Pseudomonadati	Chlamydiota	Garrity & Holt 2021	
Pseudomonadati	Verrucomicrobiota	Hedlund 2021	Kiritimatiellota; Lentisphaerota
Pseudomonadati	"Heilongiota"	Zhang et al. 2022	
Pseudomonadati	"Tianyaibacteriota"	corrig. Cui et al. 2021	
Pseudomonadati	"Hinthialibacterota"	Williams et al. 2022	OLB16
Pseudomonadati	"Tangaroaeota"	Sun et al. 2025	OLB16: "Coatesiibacteriota" (RIF8)
Pseudomonadati	"Edwardsiibacteriota"	corrig. Anantharaman et al. 2016	RIF29
Pseudomonadati	Caldifarciminota	Mori et al. 2026	"Hydrothermota" (EM3); "Caldipriscota"; "Pyropristinus"; "Stahlbacteria" (WOR-3)
Pseudomonadati	"Fermentibacterota"	corrig. Saad et al. 2017	Hyd24-12; "Aegiribacteria"
Pseudomonadati	"Cloacimonadota"	Williams et al. 2021	WWE1
Pseudomonadati	"Arandabacterota"	Gong et al. 2022	
Pseudomonadati	"Orphanbacterota"	Gong et al. 2022	
Pseudomonadati	"Eiseniibacteriota"	corrig. Anantharaman et al. 2016	RIF28
Pseudomonadati	"Joyebacterota"	Gong et al. 2022	"Effluvivivacota"
Pseudomonadati	"Krumholzibacteriota"	Youssef et al. 2019	"Delphibacteria"
Pseudomonadati	Gemmatimonadota	Zhang et al. 2021	"Glassbacteria" (RIF5)
Pseudomonadati	"Latescibacterota"	corrig. Rinke et al. 2013	WS3; "Handelsmanbacteria"
Pseudomonadati	"Zixiibacteriota"	corrig. Castelle et al. 2013	RBG-1
Pseudomonadati	"Delongiibacteriota"	corrig. Anantharaman et al. 2016	RIF26
Pseudomonadati	Fibrobacterota	Garrity & Holt 2021	"Raymondbacteria" (RIF7)
Pseudomonadati	"Electryoneota"	Williams et al. 2022	AABM5-125-24
Pseudomonadati	Fidelibacterota	Katayama et al. 2024	"Marinimicrobia"; "Marinisomatota" (SAR406); "Neomarinimicrobiota"
Pseudomonadati	"Zhuqueibacterota"	Lian et al. 2024	KSB1: "Cosmopoliota"
Pseudomonadati	Calditrichota	Kublanov et al. 2021	
Pseudomonadati	Bacteroidota	Krieg et al. 2021	Balneolota; Chlorobiota; Ignavibacteraeota; "Kapabacteria" (OPB56); "Kryptonia"; Rhodothermaeota
Pseudomonadati	"Canglongiota"	Zhang et al. 2022	
Pseudomonadati	Acidobacteriota	Thrash & Coates 2021	"Aminicenantota" (OP8); "Fischerbacteria" (RIF25)
Pseudomonadati	"Acidulodesulfobacteriota"	(sic) Pallen, Rodriguez-R & Alikhan 2022	SZUA-79
Pseudomonadati	"Calescibacteriota"	corrig. Rinke et al. 2013	EM19
Pseudomonadati	"Dadaibacteriota"	corrig. Hug et al. 2016	CSP1-2
Pseudomonadati	"Thermosulfidibacterota"	Chuvochina et al. 2023	
Pseudomonadati	Aquificota	Whitman et al. 2021	
Pseudomonadati	"Lernaellota"	Williams et al. 2022	FEN-1099
Pseudomonadati	Myxococcota	Waite et al. 2021	Fruiting gliding bacteria
Pseudomonadati	Bdellovibrionota	Waite et al. 2021	
Pseudomonadati	SAR324		RIF24
Pseudomonadati	"Oligoflexaeota"	(sic)	Bdellovibrionota_B
Pseudomonadati	"Nitrosediminicolota"	Zhao, Jorgensen & Babbin 2024	
Pseudomonadati	"Moduliflexota"	corrig. Sekiguchi et al. 2015	KSB3
Pseudomonadati	"Methylomirabilota"	Viljakainen & Hug 2021ex Chuvochina et al. 2023	NC10; "Rokubacteria" (CSP1-6)
Pseudomonadati	"Schekmaniibacteriota"	corrig. Anantharaman et al. 2016	RIF3
Pseudomonadati	"Spongiamicota"	Sun et al. 2025	
Pseudomonadati	"Entotheonellota"	Goh et al. 2019	"Tectimicrobiota"
Pseudomonadati	Nitrospinota	Lücker et al. 2021	
Pseudomonadati	Nitrospirota	Whitman et al. 2021	"Leptospirillaeota"
Pseudomonadati	Thermodesulfobacteriota	Garrity & Holt 2021	"Binatota" (Desulfobacterota B); "Deferrisomatota" (Desulfobacterota C); "Deferrimicrobiota" (Desulfobacterota E); Desulfobacterota; "Desulfovibrionota" (Desulfobacterota_I); "Desulfuromonadota"; "Tharpellota"
Pseudomonadati	"Babelota"	corrig. Yeoh et al. 2016	TM6
Pseudomonadati	Chrysiogenota	Whitman et al. 2021	Deferribacterota
Pseudomonadati	Campylobacterota	Waite et al. 2021	
Pseudomonadati	Pseudomonadota	Garrity et al. 2021	

== List ==
"Halanaerocella

Genus	Authority	Phylum	Class	Order	Family	Synonyms
"Deinonema"	Ludwig W et al. 1990					
"Ca. Ferristratum"	McAllister et al. 2021					
"Guhaiyingella"	Haiying 1995					
"Magnoovum"	Orpin 1976					Eadie's oval
"Nanobacterium"	Ciftcioglu et al. 1997					
"Nonospora"	Fokin et al. 1987					
"Ca. Ovibacter"	corrig. Fenchel & Thar 2004					
"Parakaryon"	Yamaguchi et al. 2012					Myojin parakaryote
"Pseudogluconobacter"	Shibata et al. 2001					
"Ruminobacillus"	An et al. 2005					
"Streptofusia"	Haiying 1995					
Thermothrix	Caldwell et al. 1981					
Acidicapsa	Kulichevskaya et al. 2012	Acidobacteriota	Acidobacteriia	Acidobacteriales	Acidobacteriaceae	
"Ca. Acidiflorens"	Woodcroft et al. 2018	Acidobacteriota	Acidobacteriia	Acidobacteriales	Acidobacteriaceae	
Acidipila	Okamura et al. 2015	Acidobacteriota	Acidobacteriia	Acidobacteriales	Acidobacteriaceae	
Acidisarcina	Belova et al. 2022	Acidobacteriota	Acidobacteriia	Acidobacteriales	Acidobacteriaceae	
Acidobacterium	Kishimoto et al. 1991 non Heim 1925	Acidobacteriota	Acidobacteriia	Acidobacteriales	Acidobacteriaceae	
Alloacidobacterium	Zhang et al. 2022	Acidobacteriota	Acidobacteriia	Acidobacteriales	Acidobacteriaceae	
"Ca. Angelobacter"	Crits-Christoph et al. 2022	Acidobacteriota	Acidobacteriia	Acidobacteriales	Acidobacteriaceae	
"Ca. Dedyshia"	Pieters, Conradie & Jacobs 2026	Acidobacteriota	Acidobacteriia	Acidobacteriales	Acidobacteriaceae	
Edaphobacter	Koch et al. 2008	Acidobacteriota	Acidobacteriia	Acidobacteriales	Acidobacteriaceae	Tunturiibacter corrig. Messyasz et al. 2024
Granulicella	Pankratov & Dedysh 2010	Acidobacteriota	Acidobacteriia	Acidobacteriales	Acidobacteriaceae	Bryocella Dedysh et al. 2012
Humiphilus	Itoh et al. 2026	Acidobacteriota	Acidobacteriia	Acidobacteriales	Acidobacteriaceae	
"Ca. Korobacter"	corrig. Ward et al. 2009	Acidobacteriota	Acidobacteriia	Acidobacteriales	Acidobacteriaceae	
Paracidobacterium	Zhang et al. 2022	Acidobacteriota	Acidobacteriia	Acidobacteriales	Acidobacteriaceae	
Pseudacidobacterium	Zhang et al. 2022	Acidobacteriota	Acidobacteriia	Acidobacteriales	Acidobacteriaceae	
Silvibacterium	Llado et al. 2016	Acidobacteriota	Acidobacteriia	Acidobacteriales	Acidobacteriaceae	
"Ca. Sulfuritelmatobacter"	corrig. Hausmann et al. 2018	Acidobacteriota	Acidobacteriia	Acidobacteriales	Acidobacteriaceae	
Telmatobacter	Pankratov et al. 2012	Acidobacteriota	Acidobacteriia	Acidobacteriales	Acidobacteriaceae	Occallatibacter Foesel et al. 2016; "Ca. Sulfuritelmatomonas" corrig. Hausmann et al. 2018; Terracidiphilus Garcia-Fraile et al. 2016
Terriglobus	Eichorst et al. 2007	Acidobacteriota	Acidobacteriia	Acidobacteriales	Acidobacteriaceae	
"Koromonas"	Itoh et al. 2026	Acidobacteriota	Acidobacteriia	Acidobacteriales	"Koromonadaceae"	
"Oryzophilus"	Itoh et al. 2026	Acidobacteriota	Acidobacteriia	Acidobacteriales	"Koromonadaceae"	
"Ca. Acidiferrum"	corrig. Epihov et al. 2021	Acidobacteriota	Acidobacteriia	"Acidoferrales"	"Acidoferraceae"	
"Ca. Anaerovoracibacter"	Nguyen 2022	Acidobacteriota	Acidobacteriia	Bryobacterales	"Anaerovoracibacteraceae"	
Bryobacter	Kulichevskaya et al. 2010	Acidobacteriota	Acidobacteriia	Bryobacterales	Bryobacteraceae	
Paludibaculum	Kulichevskaya et al. 2014	Acidobacteriota	Acidobacteriia	Bryobacterales	Bryobacteraceae	
"Ca. Solibacter"	Ward et al. 2009	Acidobacteriota	Acidobacteriia	Bryobacterales	Bryobacteraceae	
"Ca. Sulfuripaludibacter"	corrig. Hausmann et al. 2018	Acidobacteriota	Acidobacteriia	Bryobacterales	Bryobacteraceae	
"Ca. Versatilivorator"	Nguyen 2022	Acidobacteriota	Acidobacteriia	"Versatilivorales"	"Versatilivoraceae"	
"Ca. Aminicenans"	Rinke et al. 2013	Acidobacteriota	"Aminicenantia"	"Aminicenantales"	"Aminicenantaceae"	
"Ca. Saccharicenans"	corrig. Kadnikov et al. 2019	Acidobacteriota	"Aminicenantia"	"Aminicenantales"	"Saccharicenantaceae"	
"Ca. Eelbacter"	Crits-Christoph et al. 2018	Acidobacteriota	Blastocatellia			
Arenimicrobium	Wüstet al. 2016	Acidobacteriota	Blastocatellia	Blastocatellales	Blastocatellaceae	
Brevitalea	Wüstet al. 2016	Acidobacteriota	Blastocatellia	Blastocatellales	Blastocatellaceae	
Aridibacter	Huber et al. 2014	Acidobacteriota	Blastocatellia	Blastocatellales	Blastocatellaceae	
Blastocatella	Foesel, Rohde & Overmann 2013	Acidobacteriota	Blastocatellia	Blastocatellales	Blastocatellaceae	
Stenotrophobacter	Pascual et al. 2016	Acidobacteriota	Blastocatellia	Blastocatellales	Blastocatellaceae	
Tellurimicrobium	Pascual et al. 2016	Acidobacteriota	Blastocatellia	Blastocatellales	Blastocatellaceae	
Pyrinomonas	Crowe et al. 2014	Acidobacteriota	Blastocatellia	Blastocatellales	Blastocatellaceae	
Chloracidobacterium	Saini et al. 2026	Acidobacteriota	Blastocatellia	Chloracidobacteriales	Chloracidobacteriaceae	
"Ca. Frugalibacterium"	Ruhl et al. 2022	Acidobacteriota	Blastocatellia	"Frugalibacteriales"		
"Ca. Onstottus"	Sipes et al. 2024	Acidobacteriota	Blastocatellia	UBA7656	UBA7656	
"Ca. Guanabaribacterium"	corrig. Tschoeke et al. 2020	Acidobacteriota	"Guanabaribacteriia"	"Guanabaribacteriales"	"Guanabaribacteriaceae"	
Acanthopleuribacter	Fukunaga et al. 2008	Acidobacteriota	Holophagae	Acanthopleuribacterales	Acanthopleuribacteraceae	
Sulfidibacter	Wang et al. 2023	Acidobacteriota	Holophagae	Acanthopleuribacterales	Acanthopleuribacteraceae	
"Acidiparvus"	Wong et al. 2024	Acidobacteriota	Holophagae	Holophagales	Holophagaceae	
Geothrix	Coates et al. 1999	Acidobacteriota	Holophagae	Holophagales	Holophagaceae	
Holophaga	Liesack et al. 1995	Acidobacteriota	Holophagae	Holophagales	Holophagaceae	
Mesoterricola	Itoh et al. 2023	Acidobacteriota	Holophagae	Holophagales	Holophagaceae	
"Ca. Porrumbacterium"	Nunes da Rocha et al. 2013	Acidobacteriota	Holophagae	Holophagales	Holophagaceae	
Thermotomaculum	Izumi et al. 2017	Acidobacteriota	Holophagae	Thermotomaculales	Thermotomaculaceae	
"Ca. Polarisedimenticola"	Flieder et al. 2021	Acidobacteriota	"Polarisedimenticolia"	"Polarisedimenticolales"	"Polarisedimenticolaceae"	
"Ca. Gilichinskyi"	Sipes et al. 2024	Acidobacteriota	Thermoanaerobaculia	Gp7-AAB	Gp7-AAB	
"Ca. Multivorans"	Nguyen 2022	Acidobacteriota	Thermoanaerobaculia	"Multivorales"	"Multivoraceae"	
"Ca. Sulfomarinibacter"	Flieder et al. 2021	Acidobacteriota	Thermoanaerobaculia	Thermoanaerobaculales	"Sulfomarinibacteraceae"	
Thermoanaerobaculum	Losey et al. 2013	Acidobacteriota	Thermoanaerobaculia	Thermoanaerobaculales	Thermoanaerobaculaceae	
"Ca. Marinacidobacterium"	Nguyen 2022	Acidobacteriota	Vicinamibacteria	"Marinacidobacterales"	"Marinacidobacteraceae"	
Luteitalea	Vieira et al. 2017	Acidobacteriota	Vicinamibacteria	Vicinamibacterales	Vicinamibacteraceae	
Vicinamibacter	Huber et al. 2013	Acidobacteriota	Vicinamibacteria	Vicinamibacterales	Vicinamibacteraceae	
"Ca. Acidulidesulfobacter"	corrig. Tan et al. 2019	"Acidulodesulfobacteriota"	"Acidulodesulfobacteriia"	"Acidulidesulfobacterales"	"Acidulidesulfobacteraceae"	
"Ca. Acidulidesulfobacterium"	corrig. Tan et al. 2019	"Acidulodesulfobacteriota"	"Acidulodesulfobacteriia"	"Acidulidesulfobacterales"	"Acidulidesulfobacteraceae"	
"Ca. Hydrothermoacidobacter"	Ren et al. 2025	"Acidulodesulfobacteriota"	"Acidulodesulfobacteriia"	"Acidulidesulfobacterales"	"Acidulidesulfobacteraceae"	
"Ca. Aerophobus"	Rinke et al. 2013	"Aerophobota"	"Aerophobia"	"Aerophobales"	"Aerophobaceae"	
Aquifex	Huber et al. 1992	Aquificota	Aquificia	Aquificales	Aquificaceae	
Hydrogenivirga	Nakagawa et al. 2004	Aquificota	Aquificia	Aquificales	Aquificaceae	
Hydrogenobacter	Kawasumi et al. 1984	Aquificota	Aquificia	Aquificales	Aquificaceae	Calderobacterium Kryukov et al. 1984
Hydrogenobaculum	Stohr et al. 2001	Aquificota	Aquificia	Aquificales	Aquificaceae	
Pampinifervens	Palmer et al. 2026	Aquificota	Aquificia	Aquificales	Aquificaceae	
Thermocrinis	Huber et al. 1999	Aquificota	Aquificia	Aquificales	Aquificaceae	
Hydrogenothermus	Stohr et al. 2001	Aquificota	Aquificia	Hydrogenothermales	Hydrogenothermaceae	
Persephonella	Gotz et al. 2002	Aquificota	Aquificia	Hydrogenothermales	Hydrogenothermaceae	
Sulfurihydrogenibium	Takai et al. 2003	Aquificota	Aquificia	Hydrogenothermales	Hydrogenothermaceae	
Venenivibrio	Hetzer, McDonald & Morgan 2008	Aquificota	Aquificia	Hydrogenothermales	Hydrogenothermaceae	
Balnearium	Takai et al. 2003	Aquificota	Desulfurobacteriia	Desulfurobacteriales	Desulfurobacteriaceae	
Desulfurobacterium	L'Haridon et al. 1998	Aquificota	Desulfurobacteriia	Desulfurobacteriales	Desulfurobacteriaceae	
Phorcysia	Vetriani 2011	Aquificota	Desulfurobacteriia	Desulfurobacteriales	Desulfurobacteriaceae	
Thermovibrio	Huber et al. 2002	Aquificota	Desulfurobacteriia	Desulfurobacteriales	Desulfurobacteriaceae	
"Ca. Arandabacterum"	Gong et al. 2022	"Arandabacterota"	"Arandabacteria"	"Arandabacterales"	"Arandabacteraceae"	
"Ca. Hippobium"	Gilroy et al. 2022	Armatimonadota	UBA5829	UBA5829	UBA5829	
Abditibacterium	Tahon et al. 2018	Armatimonadota	Abditibacteriia	Abditibacteriales	Abditibacteriaceae	
Arboribacterium	Kobayashi et al. 2026	Armatimonadota	Abditibacteriia	Abditibacteriales	Abditibacteriaceae	
Armatimonas	Tamaki et al. 2011	Armatimonadota	Armatimonadia	Armatimonadales	Armatimonadaceae	
Capsulimonas	Li, Kudo & Tonouchi 2018	Armatimonadota	Armatimonadia	Armatimonadales	Capsulimonadaceae	
Chthonomonas	Lee et al. 2011	Armatimonadota	Chthonomonadia	Chthonomonadales	Chthonomonadaceae	
"Ca. Caldisaccharidevorator"	Nou et al. 2024	Armatimonadota	Fervidibacteria	Fervidibacterales	Fervidibacteraceae	
Fervidibacter	Nou et al. 2025	Armatimonadota	Fervidibacteria	Fervidibacterales	Fervidibacteraceae	
"Ca. Thermosaccharophagus"	Nou et al. 2024	Armatimonadota	Fervidibacteria	Fervidibacterales	"Thermosaccharophagaceae"	
Fimbriimonas	Im et al. 2012	Armatimonadota	Fimbriimonadia	Fimbriimonadales	Fimbriimonadaceae	"Fimbriicoccus" Salcher et al. 2025
"Ca. Nitrosymbiomonas"	Okubo et al. 2021	Armatimonadota	Fimbriimonadia	Fimbriimonadales	Fimbriimonadaceae	
"Ca. Heboniibacterum"	Okubo et al. 2021	Armatimonadota	"Heboniibacteriia"	"Heboniibacterales"	"Heboniibacteraceae"	
"Ca. Zipacnadum"	Okubo et al. 2021	Armatimonadota	"Zipacnadia"	"Zipacnadales"	"Zipacnadaceae"	"Ca. Pufisia" Pallen, Rodriguez-R & Alikhan 2022
Atribacter	Katayama et al. 2021	Atribacterota	Atribacteria	Atribacterales	Atribacteraceae	
"Ca. Nitricultor"	Jiao et al. 2024	Atribacterota	Atribacteria	Atribacterales	Atribacteraceae	"Ca. Lestofisca" Pallen, Rodriguez-R & Alikhan 2022
Atrimonas	Kawamoto et al. 2024	Atribacterota	Atribacteria	Atribacterales	Atrimonadaceae	
"Ca. Caldatribacterium"	Dodsworth et al. 2013	Atribacterota	Atribacteria	Atribacterales	"Caldatribacteriaceae"	
"Ca. Profundicultor"	Jiao et al. 2024	Atribacterota	Atribacteria	Atribacterales	"Caldatribacteriaceae"	"Ca. Puresivita" Pallen, Rodriguez-R & Alikhan 2022
"Ca. Sordicultor"	Jiao et al. 2024	Atribacterota	Atribacteria	Atribacterales	"Caldatribacteriaceae"	"Ca. Phoxesisca" Pallen, Rodriguez-R & Alikhan 2022
Thermatribacter	Jiao et al. 2024	Atribacterota	Atribacteria	Atribacterales	Thermatribacteraceae	
"Ca. Immundihabitans"	Jiao et al. 2024	Atribacterota	Atribacteria	"Phoenicimicrobiales"	"Phoenicimicrobiaceae"	"Ca. Debefatica" Pallen, Rodriguez-R & Alikhan 2022
"Ca. Infernicultor"	Jiao et al. 2024	Atribacterota	Atribacteria	"Phoenicimicrobiales"	"Phoenicimicrobiaceae"	"Ca. Rudrefana" Pallen, Rodriguez-R & Alikhan 2022
"Ca. Phoenicimicrobium"	Jiao et al. 2024	Atribacterota	Atribacteria	"Phoenicimicrobiales"	"Phoenicimicrobiaceae"	
"Ca. Sediminicultor"	Jiao et al. 2024	Atribacterota	Atribacteria	"Phoenicimicrobiales"	"Phoenicimicrobiaceae"	"Ca. Puceria" Pallen, Rodriguez-R & Alikhan 2022
"Ca. Oleihabitans"	Jiao et al. 2024	Atribacterota	Atribacteria	"Phoenicimicrobiales"	"Stramentimicrobiaceae"	
"Ca. Oleincola"	Jiao et al. 2024	Atribacterota	Atribacteria	"Phoenicimicrobiales"	"Stramentimicrobiaceae"	"Ca. Pherusosa" Pallen, Rodriguez-R & Alikhan 2022
"Ca. Stramentimicrobium"	Jiao et al. 2024	Atribacterota	Atribacteria	"Phoenicimicrobiales"	"Stramentimicrobiaceae"	"Ca. Midricetta" Pallen, Rodriguez-R & Alikhan 2022
"Ca. Theseobacter"	Williams et al. 2022	"Auribacterota"	JACPWU01	"Theseobacterales"	"Theseobacteraceae"	
"Ca. Nundrabacter"	Vigneron et al. 2025	"Auribacterota"	UBA3054	UBA3054		
"Ca. Ancaeobacter"	Williams et al. 2022	"Auribacterota"	"Ancaeobacteria"	"Ancaeobacterales"	"Ancaeobacteraceae"	
"Ca. Auribacter"	Williams et al. 2022	"Auribacterota"	"Auribacteria"	"Auribacterales"	"Auribacteraceae"	
"Ca. Erginobacter"	Williams et al. 2022	"Auribacterota"	"Erginobacteria"	"Erginobacterales"	"Erginobacteraceae"	
"Ca. Euphemobacter"	Williams et al. 2022	"Auribacterota"	"Erginobacteria"	"Erginobacterales"	"Erginobacteraceae"	
"Ca. Menyafoubacter"	Vigneron et al. 2025	"Auribacterota"	"Erginobacteria"	"Erginobacterales"	"Erginobacteraceae"	
"Ca. Tritonobacter"	Williams et al. 2022	"Auribacterota"	"Tritonobacteria"	"Tritonobacterales"	"Tritonobacteraceae"	
"Ca. Babela"	Cohen et al. 2011	"Babelota"	"Babeliae"	"Babelales"	"Babelaceae"	
"Chromulinivorax"	corrig. Deeg et al. 2019	"Babelota"	"Babeliae"	"Babelales"	"Chromulinivoraceae"	
"Vermiphilus"	Dleafont et al. 2015	"Babelota"	"Babeliae"	"Babelales"	"Vermiphilaceae"	
"Ca. Acetithermum"	corrig. Takami et al. 2012	"Bipolaricaulota"	"Bipolaricaulia"	"Bipolaricaulales"	"Bipolaricaulaceae"	Acetothermum Takami et al. 2012 non Acetothermus Dietrich et al. 1988
"Ca. Bipolaricaulis"	Hao et al. 2018	"Bipolaricaulota"	"Bipolaricaulia"	"Bipolaricaulales"	"Bipolaricaulaceae"	
Bacteriovorax	Baer et al. 2000	Bdellovibrionota	Bacteriovoracia	Bacteriovoracales	Bacteriovoracaceae	Bacteriolyticum Piñeiro, Williams & Stine 2008
Halobacteriovorax	Koval, Williams & Stine 2015	Bdellovibrionota	Bacteriovoracia	Bacteriovoracales	Bacteriovoracaceae	
Peredibacter	Davidov & Jurkevitch 2004	Bdellovibrionota	Bacteriovoracia	Bacteriovoracales	Bacteriovoracaceae	
Bdellovibrio	Stolp & Starr 1963	Bdellovibrionota	Bdellovibrionia	Bdellovibrionales	Bdellovibrionaceae	
Pseudobdellovibrio	Waite et al. 2020	Bdellovibrionota	Bdellovibrionia	Bdellovibrionales	Bdellovibrionaceae	
Caldifarcimen	Mori et al. 2026	Caldifarciminota	Caldifarciminia	Caldifarciminales	Caldifarciminaceae	
"Ca. Caldipriscus"	Colman et al. 2016	Caldifarciminota	Caldifarciminia	"Caldipriscales"	"Caldipriscaceae"	
"Ca. Thermoproauctor"	Colman et al. 2016	Caldifarciminota	Caldifarciminia	"Caldipriscales"	"Caldipriscaceae"	
"Ca. Hydrothermus"	Chuvochina et al. 2019	Caldifarciminota	Caldifarciminia	"Hydrothermales"	"Hydrothermaceae"	
"Ca. Tepidihabitans"	Slobodkina et al. 2025	Caldifarciminota	"Tepidihabitantia"	"Tepidihabitantales"	"Tepidihabitantaceae"	
Caldisericum	Mori et al. 2009	Caldisericota	Caldisericia	Caldisericales	Caldisericaceae	
"Ca. Cryosericum"	Martinez et al. 2019	Caldisericota	Caldisericia	"Cryosericales"	"Cryosericaceae"	
Caldithrix	Miroshnichenko et al. 2003	Calditrichota	Calditrichia	Calditrichales	Calditrichaceae	
Calorithrix	Kompantseva et al. 2016	Calditrichota	Calditrichia	Calditrichales	Calditrichaceae	
"Ca. Calescibacterium"	Rinke et al. 2013	"Calescibacteriota"	"Calescibacteriia"	"Calescibacteriales"	"Calescibacteriaceae"	
"Ca. Calescimonas"	Rinke et al. 2013	"Calescibacteriota"	"Calescibacteriia"	"Calescibacteriales"	"Calescibacteriaceae"	
"Daptobacter"	Guerrero et al. 1986	Campylobacterota	"Campylobacteria"	Campylobacterales		
"Thiofractor"	Makita et al. 2012	Campylobacterota	"Campylobacteria"	Campylobacterales		
Aliarcobacter	corrig. Pérez-Cataluña et al. 2020	Campylobacterota	"Campylobacteria"	Campylobacterales	Arcobacteraceae	Pseudarcobacter corrig. Pérez-Cataluña et al. 2019
Arcobacter	Vandamme et al. 1991	Campylobacterota	"Campylobacteria"	Campylobacterales	Arcobacteraceae	
Halarcobacter	corrig. Pérez-Cataluña et al. 2019	Campylobacterota	"Campylobacteria"	Campylobacterales	Arcobacteraceae	
Malaciobacter	corrig. Pérez-Cataluña et al. 2019	Campylobacterota	"Campylobacteria"	Campylobacterales	Arcobacteraceae	
"Marinarcus"	corrig. Oren et al. 2020	Campylobacterota	"Campylobacteria"	Campylobacterales	Arcobacteraceae	"Ca. Arcomarinus" Pérez-Cataluña et al. 2018
Poseidonibacter	Pérez-Cataluña et al. 2019	Campylobacterota	"Campylobacteria"	Campylobacterales	Arcobacteraceae	
Campylobacter	Sebald & Veron 1963	Campylobacterota	"Campylobacteria"	Campylobacterales	Campylobacteraceae	
"Flexispira"	Bryner 1987	Campylobacterota	"Campylobacteria"	Campylobacterales	Helicobacteraceae	
Helicobacter	Goodwin et al. 1989	Campylobacterota	"Campylobacteria"	Campylobacterales	Helicobacteraceae	"Gastrospirillum" McNulty et al. 1989
"Pseudohelicobacter"	Waite, Chuvochina & Hugenholtz 2019	Campylobacterota	"Campylobacteria"	Campylobacterales	Helicobacteraceae	
Wolinella	Tanner et al. 1981	Campylobacterota	"Campylobacteria"	Campylobacterales	Helicobacteraceae	
Hydrogenimonas	Takai et al. 2004	Campylobacterota	"Campylobacteria"	Campylobacterales	Hydrogenimonadaceae	
"Ca. Thioturbo"	Muyzer et al. 2005	Campylobacterota	"Campylobacteria"	Campylobacterales	Nitratiruptoraceae	
Nitratiruptor	Nakagawa et al. 2005	Campylobacterota	"Campylobacteria"	Campylobacterales	Nitratiruptoraceae	
Nitrosophilus	Shiotani et al. 2021	Campylobacterota	"Campylobacteria"	Campylobacterales	Nitratiruptoraceae	
"Hydrocurvibacter"	Cui et al. 2025	Campylobacterota	"Campylobacteria"	Campylobacterales	Sulfurimonadaceae	
"Sulfonitrofixus"	Cui et al. 2025	Campylobacterota	"Campylobacteria"	Campylobacterales	Sulfurimonadaceae	
Sulfuricurvum	Kodama & Watanabe 2004	Campylobacterota	"Campylobacteria"	Campylobacterales	Sulfurimonadaceae	
Sulfurimonas	Inagaki et al. 2003	Campylobacterota	"Campylobacteria"	Campylobacterales	Sulfurimonadaceae	
"Thiomicrolobovum"	Cui et al. 2025	Campylobacterota	"Campylobacteria"	Campylobacterales	Sulfurimonadaceae	
Sulfurospirillum	Schumacher, Kroneck & Pfennig 1993	Campylobacterota	"Campylobacteria"	Campylobacterales	Sulfurospirillaceae	Dehalospirillum Scholz-Muramatsu et al. 2002; "Geospirillum" Lonergan et al. 1996
Nitratifractor	Nakagawa et al. 2005	Campylobacterota	"Campylobacteria"	Campylobacterales	Sulfurovaceae	
Sulfurovum	Inagaki et al. 2004	Campylobacterota	"Campylobacteria"	Campylobacterales	Sulfurovaceae	
"Ca. Thiobarba"	Assie et al. 2020	Campylobacterota	"Campylobacteria"	Campylobacterales	"Thiobarbaceae"	
Thioreductor	Nakagawa et al. 2005	Campylobacterota	"Campylobacteria"	Campylobacterales	Thioreductoraceae	
Thiovulum	Hinze 1913	Campylobacterota	"Campylobacteria"	Campylobacterales	"Thiovulaceae"	
Caminibacter	Alain et al. 2002	Campylobacterota	"Campylobacteria"	Nautiliales	Nautiliaceae	Cetia Grosche et al. 2015
Lebetimonas	Takai et al. 2005	Campylobacterota	"Campylobacteria"	Nautiliales	Nautiliaceae	
Nautilia	Miroshnichenko et al. 2002	Campylobacterota	"Campylobacteria"	Nautiliales	Nautiliaceae	
Desulfurella	Bonch-Osmolovskaya et al. 1993	Campylobacterota	Desulfurellia	Desulfurellales	Desulfurellaceae	
Hippea	Miroshnichenko et al. 1999	Campylobacterota	Desulfurellia	Desulfurellales	Hippeaceae	
"Ca. Canglongia"	Zhang et al. 2022	"Canglongiota"	"Canglongiia"	"Canglongiales"	"Canglongiaceae"	
"Ca. Algichlamydia"	Davison & Hurst 2023	Chlamydiota	Chlamydiia	Chlamydiales	JAJFMI01	
"Ca. Amphritriteisimkania"	corrig. Davison & Hurst 2023	Chlamydiota	Chlamydiia	Chlamydiales	JACRBE01	
"Ca. Actinochlamydia"	Steigen et al. 2013	Chlamydiota	Chlamydiia	Chlamydiales	"Actinochlamydiaceae"	
"Ca. Amphibiichlamydia"	Martel et al. 2012	Chlamydiota	Chlamydiia	Chlamydiales	Chlamydiaceae	
Chlamydia	Jones et al. 1945	Chlamydiota	Chlamydiia	Chlamydiales	Chlamydiaceae	"Chlamydozoon" Moshkovskiy 1945 non von Prowazek 1907
Chlamydiifrater	Vorimore et al. 2023	Chlamydiota	Chlamydiia	Chlamydiales	Chlamydiaceae	
Chlamydophila	Everett et al. 1999	Chlamydiota	Chlamydiia	Chlamydiales	Chlamydiaceae	"Bedsonia" Meyer 1953 ex Levaditi, Roger & Destombes 1964; "Microbacterium" Levinthal 1930 non Orla-Jensen 1919 non Cohn 1872
"Ca. Clavichlamydia"	corrig. Karlsen et al. 2008	Chlamydiota	Chlamydiia	Chlamydiales	Chlamydiaceae	
"Ca. Medusoplasma"	Viver et al. 2017	Chlamydiota	Chlamydiia	Chlamydiales	Chlamydiaceae	
"Criblamydia"	Thomas, Casson & Greub 2006	Chlamydiota	Chlamydiia	Chlamydiales	"Criblamydiaceae"	
"Estrella"	Corsaro, Feroldi & Greub 2007	Chlamydiota	Chlamydiia	Chlamydiales	"Criblamydiaceae"	
"Endochlamydia"	Schwarzhans et al. 2026	Chlamydiota	Chlamydiia	Chlamydiales	"Endochlamydiaceae"	
"Ca. Mesochlamydia"	Corsaro et al. 2012	Chlamydiota	Chlamydiia	Chlamydiales	Parachlamydiaceae	
"Ca. Metachlamydia"	Corsaro et al. 2010	Chlamydiota	Chlamydiia	Chlamydiales	Parachlamydiaceae	
Neochlamydia	Horn et al. 2001	Chlamydiota	Chlamydiia	Chlamydiales	Parachlamydiaceae	
Parachlamydia	Everett, Bush & Andersen 1999	Chlamydiota	Chlamydiia	Chlamydiales	Parachlamydiaceae	
"Ca. Protochlamydia"	Collingro et al. 2005	Chlamydiota	Chlamydiia	Chlamydiales	Parachlamydiaceae	
"Ca. Rubidus"	Pagnier et al. 2015	Chlamydiota	Chlamydiia	Chlamydiales	Parachlamydiaceae	
"Ca. Paraparilichlamydia"	Sood et al. 2019 corrig. Oren & Garrity 2021	Chlamydiota	Chlamydiia	Chlamydiales	"Parilichlamydiaceae"	"Ca. Panilichlamydia" Sood et al. 2019
"Ca. Parilichlamydia"	Stride et al. 2013	Chlamydiota	Chlamydiia	Chlamydiales	"Parilichlamydiaceae"	
"Ca. Similichlamydia"	Stride et al. 2013	Chlamydiota	Chlamydiia	Chlamydiales	"Parilichlamydiaceae"	
"Ca. Piscichlamydia"	Draghi et al. 2004	Chlamydiota	Chlamydiia	Chlamydiales	"Piscichlamydiaceae"	
"Ca. Acherontichlamydia"	corrig. Davison & Hurst 2023	Chlamydiota	Chlamydiia	Chlamydiales	"Rhabdochlamydiaceae"	"Ca. Acheromyda] Davison & Hurst 2023
"Ca. Euplotechlamydia"	Wang et al. 2023	Chlamydiota	Chlamydiia	Chlamydiales	"Rhabdochlamydiaceae"	
"Reclusachlamydia"	Helmlinger et al. 2025	Chlamydiota	Chlamydiia	Chlamydiales	"Rhabdochlamydiaceae"	
"Ca. Renichlamydia"	Corsaro & Work 2012	Chlamydiota	Chlamydiia	Chlamydiales	"Rhabdochlamydiaceae"	
"Ca. Rhabdochlamydia"	Kostanjsek et al. 2004	Chlamydiota	Chlamydiia	Chlamydiales	"Rhabdochlamydiaceae"	
"Ca. Sacchariniichlamydia"	corrig. Davison & Hurst 2023	Chlamydiota	Chlamydiia	Chlamydiales	"Rhabdochlamydiaceae"	"Ca. Sacchlamyda" Davison & Hurst 2023
"Ca. Fritschea"	Everett et al. 2005	Chlamydiota	Chlamydiia	Chlamydiales	Simkaniaceae	
"Ca. Neptunichlamydia"	corrig. Pizzetti et al. 2016	Chlamydiota	Chlamydiia	Chlamydiales	Simkaniaceae	
Simkania	Everett, Bush & Andersen 1999	Chlamydiota	Chlamydiia	Chlamydiales	Simkaniaceae	
"Ca. Syngnamydia"	Fehr et al. 2013	Chlamydiota	Chlamydiia	Chlamydiales	Simkaniaceae	
Waddlia	Rurangirwa et al. 1999	Chlamydiota	Chlamydiia	Chlamydiales	Waddliaceae	
"Ca. Caldibacter"	corrig. Spieck et al. 2020	Chloroflexota				
"Ca. Chlorotrichoides"	corrig. Oren et al. 2020	Chloroflexota				"Ca. Chlorothrix" Klappenbach & Pierson 2004 non Dyar 1921 non Berger-Perrot 1982
"Ca. Nitrocaldera"	Spieck et al. 2020	Chloroflexota				
"Ca. Nitrotheca"	Spieck et al. 2020	Chloroflexota				
"Ca. Aeolococcus"	Montgomery et al. 2021	Chloroflexota	"Dormibacteria"	"Aeolococcales"	"Aeolococcaceae"	"Ca. Amunia" Montgomery et al. 2021
"Ca. Changshengia"	Woodcroft et al. 2018	Chloroflexota	"Dormibacteria"	"Aeolococcales"	"Aeolococcaceae"	
"Ca. Dormiibacter"	corrig. Ji et al. 2017	Chloroflexota	"Dormibacteria"	"Dormibacterales"	"Dormibacteraceae"	
"Ca. Nephthysia"	Montgomery et al. 2021	Chloroflexota	"Dormibacteria"	"Dormibacterales"	"Dormibacteraceae"	
"Ca. Defluviifilum"	Nierychlo et al. 2019	Chloroflexota	"Caldilineia"			
Ardenticatena	Kawaichi et al. 2013	Chloroflexota	"Caldilineia"	Ardenticatenales	Ardenticatenaceae	
Aggregatilinea	Nakahara et al. 2019	Chloroflexota	"Caldilineia"	Aggregatilineales	Aggregatilineaceae	
"Ca. Flexicrinis"	Petriglieri et al. 2023	Chloroflexota	"Caldilineia"	Aggregatilineales	"Phototrophicaceae"	
"Ca. Flexifilum"	Petriglieri et al. 2023	Chloroflexota	"Caldilineia"	Aggregatilineales	"Phototrophicaceae"	
"Phototrophicus"	Zheng et al. 2022	Chloroflexota	"Caldilineia"	Aggregatilineales	"Phototrophicaceae"	
Anaerolinea	Sekiguchi et al. 2003	Chloroflexota	"Caldilineia"	Anaerolineales	Anaerolineaceae	
Bellilinea	Yamada et al. 2007	Chloroflexota	"Caldilineia"	Anaerolineales	Anaerolineaceae	
"Ca. Brevifilum"	corrig. McIlroy et al. 2017	Chloroflexota	"Caldilineia"	Anaerolineales	Anaerolineaceae	
Flexilinea	Sun et al. 2016	Chloroflexota	"Caldilineia"	Anaerolineales	Anaerolineaceae	
Leptolinea	Yamada et al. 2006	Chloroflexota	"Caldilineia"	Anaerolineales	Anaerolineaceae	
Levilinea	Yamada et al. 2006	Chloroflexota	"Caldilineia"	Anaerolineales	Anaerolineaceae	
Longilinea	Yamada et al. 2007	Chloroflexota	"Caldilineia"	Anaerolineales	Anaerolineaceae	
"Ca. Mesolinea"	Bedoya-Urrego & Alzate 2024	Chloroflexota	"Caldilineia"	Anaerolineales	Anaerolineaceae	
Ornatilinea	Podosokorskaya et al. 2013	Chloroflexota	"Caldilineia"	Anaerolineales	Anaerolineaceae	
"Ca. Pachofilum"	Petriglieri et al. 2023	Chloroflexota	"Caldilineia"	Anaerolineales	Anaerolineaceae	
Pelolinea	Imachi et al. 2014	Chloroflexota	"Caldilineia"	Anaerolineales	Anaerolineaceae	
Thermanaerothrix	Gregoire et al. 2025	Chloroflexota	"Caldilineia"	Anaerolineales	Anaerolineaceae	
Thermomarinilinea	corrig. Nunoura et al. 2013	Chloroflexota	"Caldilineia"	Anaerolineales	Anaerolineaceae	
"Ca. Tricholinea"	Petriglieri et al. 2023	Chloroflexota	"Caldilineia"	Anaerolineales	Anaerolineaceae	
"Ca. Profundisolitarius"	Mehrshad et al. 2018	Chloroflexota	"Caldilineia"	Anaerolineales	"Profundisolitariaceae"	
"Ca. Defluviilinea"	Petriglieri et al. 2023	Chloroflexota	"Caldilineia"	Anaerolineales	"Villigracilaceae"	
"Ca. Denitrolinea"	corrig. Okubo et al. 2021	Chloroflexota	"Caldilineia"	Anaerolineales	"Villigracilaceae"	"Ca. Manresella" Petriglieri et al. 2023
"Desulfolinea"	Van Vliet et al. 2020	Chloroflexota	"Caldilineia"	Anaerolineales	"Villigracilaceae"	
"Ca. Manresella"	Petriglieri et al. 2023	Chloroflexota	"Caldilineia"	Anaerolineales	"Villigracilaceae"	
"Ca. Villigracilis"	Nierychlo et al. 2019	Chloroflexota	"Caldilineia"	Anaerolineales	"Villigracilaceae"	
"Ca. Amarolinea"	Andersen et al. 2018	Chloroflexota	"Caldilineia"	SSC4	"Amarolineaceae"	
"Ca. Sarcinithrix"	Nierychlo et al. 2019	Chloroflexota	"Caldilineia"	SSC4	"Amarolineaceae"	
Caldilinea	Sekiguchi et al. 2003	Chloroflexota	"Caldilineia"	Caldilineales	Caldilineaceae	
"Ca. Fredericiella"	Petriglieri et al. 2023	Chloroflexota	"Caldilineia"	Caldilineales	Caldilineaceae	
Litorilinea	Kale et al. 2013	Chloroflexota	"Caldilineia"	Caldilineales	Caldilineaceae	
"Ca. Avedoeria"	Petriglieri et al. 2023	Chloroflexota	"Caldilineia"	"Epilineales"	"Epilineaceae"	
"Ca. Epilinea"	Petriglieri et al. 2023	Chloroflexota	"Caldilineia"	"Epilineales"	"Epilineaceae"	
"Ca. Brachythrix"	Petriglieri et al. 2023 non Braun 1865 non Wild & Pope 1978 non McFadden 1970	Chloroflexota	"Caldilineia"	J036	"Roseilineaceae"	
"Ca. Roseilinea"	Thiel et al. 2016	Chloroflexota	"Caldilineia"	J036	"Roseilineaceae"	
"Ca. Hadersleviella"	Petriglieri et al. 2023	Chloroflexota	"Caldilineia"	"Promineifilales"	"Promineifilaceae"	
"Ca. Leptofilum"	Petriglieri et al. 2023	Chloroflexota	"Caldilineia"	"Promineifilales"	"Promineifilaceae"	
"Ca. Leptovillus"	Petriglieri et al. 2023	Chloroflexota	"Caldilineia"	"Promineifilales"	"Promineifilaceae"	
"Ca. Promineifilum"	McIlroy et al. 2016	Chloroflexota	"Caldilineia"	"Promineifilales"	"Promineifilaceae"	
"Ca. Trichofilum"	Petriglieri et al. 2023	Chloroflexota	"Caldilineia"	"Promineifilales"	"Promineifilaceae"	
Thermoflexus	Thiel et al. 2016	Chloroflexota	"Caldilineia"	Thermoflexales	Thermoflexaceae	
"Dehalobium"	Kittelmann & Friedrich 2008	Chloroflexota	Chloroflexia	Chloroflexales		
"Ca. Lithoflexus"	Saghai et al. 2020	Chloroflexota	Chloroflexia	Chloroflexales		
"Ca. Chloranaerofilum"	Thiel et al. 2016	Chloroflexota	Chloroflexia	Chloroflexales	Chloroflexaceae	
Chloroflexus	Pierson & Castenholz 1974	Chloroflexota	Chloroflexia	Chloroflexales	Chloroflexaceae	"Chlorocrinis" Ward et al. 1998
Chloronema	Dubinina & Gorlenko 1975	Chloroflexota	Chloroflexia	Chloroflexales	Chloroflexaceae	
"Ca. Chloroploca"	Gorlenko et al. 2014	Chloroflexota	Chloroflexia	Chloroflexales	Chloroflexaceae	
Oscillochloris	Gorlenko & Pivovarova 1989	Chloroflexota	Chloroflexia	Chloroflexales	Chloroflexaceae	
"Ca. Viridilinea"	Grouzdev et al. 2018	Chloroflexota	Chloroflexia	Chloroflexales	Chloroflexaceae	"Ca. Viridifilum" Toshchakov et al. 2026
"Ca. Anthektikosiphon"	Ward, Fischer & McGlynn 2020	Chloroflexota	Chloroflexia	Chloroflexales	Herpetosiphonaceae	
Herpetosiphon	Holt & Lewin 1968	Chloroflexota	Chloroflexia	Chloroflexales	Herpetosiphonaceae	
Kallotenue	Cole et al. 2013	Chloroflexota	Chloroflexia	Chloroflexales	Kallotenuaceae	
"Ca. Amarofilum"	Petriglieri et al. 2023	Chloroflexota	Chloroflexia	Chloroflexales	Roseiflexaceae	
Heliothrix	Pierson et al. 1986	Chloroflexota	Chloroflexia	Chloroflexales	Roseiflexaceae	
"Kouleothrix"	Kohno et al. 2002	Chloroflexota	Chloroflexia	Chloroflexales	Roseiflexaceae	
"Ca. Ribeiella"	Petriglieri et al. 2023	Chloroflexota	Chloroflexia	Chloroflexales	Roseiflexaceae	
Roseiflexus	Hanada et al. 2002	Chloroflexota	Chloroflexia	Chloroflexales	Roseiflexaceae	
"Ca. Chlorohelix"	Tsuji et al. 2024	Chloroflexota	Chloroflexia	Chlorohelicales"	"Chloroheliaceae"	
"Thermobaculum"	Botero et al. 2004	Chloroflexota	Chloroflexia	"Thermobaculales"	"Thermobaculaceae"	
Nitrolancea	Sorokin et al. 2014	Chloroflexota	Chloroflexia	Thermomicrobiales	Thermomicrobiaceae	
Sphaerobacter	Demharter et al. 1989	Chloroflexota	Chloroflexia	Thermomicrobiales	Thermomicrobiaceae	
Thermalbibacter	Zhao et al. 2023	Chloroflexota	Chloroflexia	Thermomicrobiales	Thermomicrobiaceae	
Thermomicrobium	Jackson et al. 1973	Chloroflexota	Chloroflexia	Thermomicrobiales	Thermomicrobiaceae	
Thermorudis	King & King 2014	Chloroflexota	Chloroflexia	Thermomicrobiales	Thermomicrobiaceae	
"Ca. Bathosphaera"	Mehrshad et al. 2018	Chloroflexota	Dehalococcoidia	"Bathosphaerales"	"Bathosphaeraceae"	
Dehalococcoides	Löffler et al. 2013	Chloroflexota	Dehalococcoidia	Dehalococcoidales	Dehalococcoidaceae	
Dehalogenimonas	Moe et al. 2009	Chloroflexota	Dehalococcoidia	Dehalococcoidales	Dehalococcoidaceae	
"Ca. Australimonas"	Prabhu et al. 2024	Chloroflexota	Dehalococcoidia	"Monstramarinales"	"Australimonadaceae"	
"Ca. Lucifugimonas"	Lim et al. 2023	Chloroflexota	Dehalococcoidia	"Monstramarinales"	"Lucifugimonadaceae"	
"Carboxydicoccus"	Dede et al. 2024	Chloroflexota	Dehalococcoidia	"Monstramariales"	"Monstramariaceae"	
"Ca. Amarobacillus"	Petriglieri et al. 2023	Chloroflexota	Dehalococcoidia	Tepidiformales	Tepidiformaceae	
"Ca. Amarobacter"	Petriglieri et al. 2023	Chloroflexota	Dehalococcoidia	Tepidiformales	Tepidiformaceae	
Tepidiforma	Kochetkova et al. 2020	Chloroflexota	Dehalococcoidia	Tepidiformales	Tepidiformaceae	
Dictyobacter	Yabe et al. 2017	Chloroflexota	Ktedonobacteria	Ktedonobacterales	Ktedonobacteraceae	
Ktedonobacter	corrig. Cavaletti et al. 2007	Chloroflexota	Ktedonobacteria	Ktedonobacterales	Ktedonobacteraceae	Ktedonospora Yabe et al. 2021
Ktedonosporobacter	Yan et al. 2020	Chloroflexota	Ktedonobacteria	Ktedonobacterales	Ktedonobacteraceae	
"Ca. Paraktedonobacter"	Roy et al. 2025	Chloroflexota	Ktedonobacteria	Ktedonobacterales	Ktedonobacteraceae	
Tengunoibacter	Wang et al. 2019	Chloroflexota	Ktedonobacteria	Ktedonobacterales	Ktedonobacteraceae	
Thermogemmatispora	Yabe et al. 2011	Chloroflexota	Ktedonobacteria	Ktedonobacterales	Ktedonobacteraceae	
Thermosporothrix	Yabe et al. 2010	Chloroflexota	Ktedonobacteria	Ktedonobacterales	Ktedonobacteraceae	
Reticulibacter	Yabe et al. 2021	Chloroflexota	Ktedonobacteria	Ktedonobacterales	Reticulibacteraceae	
"Ca. Edaphomicrobium"	Ortiz et al. 2021	Chloroflexota	"Limnocylindria"	"Limnocylindrales"	"Edaphomicrobiaceae"	
"Ca. Aquidulcis"	corrig. Rodriguez-R et al. 2020	Chloroflexota	"Limnocylindria"	"Limnocylindrales"	"Limnocylindraceae"	
"Ca. Limnocylindrus"	Mehrshad et al. 2018	Chloroflexota	"Limnocylindria"	"Limnocylindrales"	"Limnocylindraceae"	
"Ca. Laranimicrobium"	Williams et al. 2024	Chloroflexota	"Martimicrobia"	"Martimicrobiales"	"Martimicrobiaceae"	
"Ca. Martimicrobium"	Williams et al. 2024	Chloroflexota	"Martimicrobia"	"Martimicrobiales"	"Martimicrobiaceae"	
"Ca. Poriflexus"	Kogawa et al. 2022	Chloroflexota	"Poriflexia"			
"Ca. Aglaurobacter"	Williams et al. 2024	Chloroflexota	"Spiritibacteria"	"Spiritibacterales"	"Spiritibacteraceae"	
"Ca. Otrerea"	Williams et al. 2024	Chloroflexota	"Spiritibacteria"	"Spiritibacterales"	"Spiritibacteraceae"	
"Ca. Spiritibacter"	Williams et al. 2024	Chloroflexota	"Spiritibacteria"	"Spiritibacterales"	"Spiritibacteraceae"	
"Ca. Tarhunnaea"	Williams et al. 2024	Chloroflexota	"Tarhunnaeia"	"Tarhunnaeales"	"Tarhunnaeaceae"	
"Ca. Sutekhia"	Williams et al. 2024	Chloroflexota	"Tarhunnaeia"	"Tarhunnaeales"	"Tarhunnaeaceae"	
"Ca. Uliximicrobium"	Williams et al. 2024	Chloroflexota	"Umbricyclopia"	"Umbricyclopales"	"Uliximicrobiaceae"	
"Ca. Umbricyclops"	Mehrshad et al. 2018	Chloroflexota	"Umbricyclopia"	"Umbricyclopales"	"Umbricyclopaceae"	
Chrysiogenes	Macy et al. 1996	Chrysiogenota	Chrysiogenia	Chrysiogenales	Chrysiogenaceae	
Desulfurispira	Sorokin & Muyzer 2010	Chrysiogenota	Chrysiogenia	Chrysiogenales	Chrysiogenaceae	
Desulfurispirillum	Sorokin et al. 2010	Chrysiogenota	Chrysiogenia	Chrysiogenales	Chrysiogenaceae	"Selenospirillum" Narasingarao & Häggblom 2006
Petrothermobacter	Tamazawa et al. 2017	Chrysiogenota	Deferribacteria	Deferribacterales		
Calditerrivibrio	Iino et al. 2008	Chrysiogenota	Deferribacteria	Deferribacterales	Calditerrivibrionaceae	
Deferribacter	Greene et al. 1997	Chrysiogenota	Deferribacteria	Deferribacterales	Deferribacteraceae	
Deferrivibrio	Zavarzina et al. 2023	Chrysiogenota	Deferribacteria	Deferribacterales	Deferrivibrionaceae	
Flexistipes	Fiala et al. 2000	Chrysiogenota	Deferribacteria	Deferribacterales	Flexistipitaceae	
Denitrovibrio	Myhr & Torsvik 2000	Chrysiogenota	Deferribacteria	Deferribacterales	Geovibriaceae	
Geovibrio	Caccavo et al. 2000	Chrysiogenota	Deferribacteria	Deferribacterales	Geovibriaceae	
Limisalsivibrio	Spring et al. 2022	Chrysiogenota	Deferribacteria	Deferribacterales	Geovibriaceae	
Seleniivibrio	Rauschenbach et al. 2013	Chrysiogenota	Deferribacteria	Deferribacterales	Geovibriaceae	
"Ca. Rimicarispirillum"	Aubé et al. 2022	Chrysiogenota	Deferribacteria	Deferribacterales	"Microvillispirillaceae"	
Mucispirillum	Robertson et al. 2005	Chrysiogenota	Deferribacteria	Deferribacterales	Mucispirillaceae	
"Ca. Termitispirillum"	Maruoka et al. 2026	Chrysiogenota	Deferribacteria	Deferribacterales	"Termitispirillaceae"	
"Ca. Digestoria"	Calusinska et al. 2026	"Cloacimonadota"	"Cloacimonadia"			
"Ca. Celaenobacter"	corrig. Williams et al. 2021	"Cloacimonadota"	"Cloacimonadia"	JGIOTU-2	JGIOTU-2	
"Ca. Zophobacter"	Williams et al. 2021	"Cloacimonadota"	"Cloacimonadia"	"Cloacimonadales"	JAFGVF01	
"Ca. Stygiibacter"	corrig. Williams et al. 2021	"Cloacimonadota"	"Cloacimonadia"	"Cloacimonadales"	TCS61	
"Ca. Tenebribacter"	Williams et al. 2021	"Cloacimonadota"	"Cloacimonadia"	"Cloacimonadales"	TCS61	
"Ca. Cloacimonas"	Pelletier et al. 2008 corrig. Rinke et al. 2013	"Cloacimonadota"	"Cloacimonadia"	"Cloacimonadales"	"Cloacimonadaceae"	
"Syntrophosphaera"	Dyksma & Gallert 2019	"Cloacimonadota"	"Cloacimonadia"	"Cloacimonadales"	"Cloacimonadaceae"	
Coprothermobacter	Rainey & Stackebrandt 1993	Coprothermobacterota	Coprothermobacteria	Coprothermobacterales	Coprothermobacteraceae	
"Ca. Lithacetigena"	Nobu et al. 2022	Coprothermobacterota	HKB111	HKB111	HKB111	"Ca. Psychracetigena" Nobu et al. 2022
"Ca. Mycalebacterium"	Gavriilidou et al. 2023	"Dadaibacteriota"	"Dadaibacteriia"	"Nemesobacterales"	"Mycalebacteriaceae"	
"Ca. Nemesobacter"	Gavriilidou et al. 2023	"Dadaibacteriota"	"Dadaibacteriia"	"Nemesobacterales"	"Nemesobacteraceae"	
"Ca. Spongomicrobium"	Gavriilidou et al. 2023	"Dadaibacteriota"	"Dadaibacteriia"	"Nemesobacterales"	"Spongomicrobiaceae"	
Deinobacterium	Ekman et al. 2011	Deinococcota	Deinococci	Deinococcales	Deinococcaceae	
Deinococcus	Brooks & Murray 1981	Deinococcota	Deinococci	Deinococcales	Deinococcaceae	Deinobacter Oyaizu et al. 1987
Marinithermus	Sako et al. 2003	Deinococcota	Deinococci	Deinococcales	Marinithermaceae	
Oceanithermus	Miroshnichenko et al. 2003	Deinococcota	Deinococci	Deinococcales	Marinithermaceae	
Rhabdothermus	Steinsbu et al. 2011	Deinococcota	Deinococci	Deinococcales	Marinithermaceae	
Vulcanithermus	Miroshnichenko et al. 2003	Deinococcota	Deinococci	Deinococcales	Marinithermaceae	
Allomeiothermus	Jiao et al. 2023	Deinococcota	Deinococci	Deinococcales	Thermaceae	
Calidithermus	Raposo et al. 2019	Deinococcota	Deinococci	Deinococcales	Thermaceae	
Meiothermus	Nobre et al. 1996	Deinococcota	Deinococci	Deinococcales	Thermaceae	
Thermus	Brock & Freeze 1969	Deinococcota	Deinococci	Deinococcales	Thermaceae	
Truepera	Albuquerque, da Costa & Rainey 2005	Deinococcota	Deinococci	Deinococcales	Trueperaceae	
Dictyoglomus	Saiki et al. 1985	Dictyoglomerota	Dictyoglomeria	Dictyoglomerales	Dictyoglomeraceae	
"Ca. Hatepunaea"	Williams et al. 2022	"Electryoneota"	AABM5-125-24	"Hatepunaeales"	"Hatepunaeaceae"	
"Ca. Electryonea"	Williams et al. 2022	"Electryoneota"	"Electryoneia"	"Electryoneales"	"Electryoneaceae"	"Candidatus Debefia gixafia" Pallen, Rodriguez-R & Alikhan 2022
"Ca. Tariuqbacter"	Vigneron, Vincent & Lovejoy 2023	"Electryoneota"	"Tariuqbacteria"	"Tariuqbacterales"	"Tariuqbacteraceae"	
"Ca. Elulimicrobium"	Rodriguez-R et al. 2020	"Elulimicrobiota"	"Elulimicrobia"	"Elulimicrobiales"	"Elulimicrobiaceae"	
"Ca. Avelusimicrobium"	Gilroy et al. 2021	Elusimicrobiota	"Elusimicrobiia"	Elusimicrobiales	Elusimicrobiaceae	"Ca. Climedana" Pallen, Rodriguez-R & Alikhan 2022
Elusimicrobium	Geissinger et al. 2010	Elusimicrobiota	"Elusimicrobiia"	Elusimicrobiales	Elusimicrobiaceae	
"Parelusimicrobium"	Mies et al. 2025	Elusimicrobiota	"Elusimicrobiia"	Elusimicrobiales	Elusimicrobiaceae	
"Ca. Proelusimicrobium"	Mies et al. 2025	Elusimicrobiota	"Elusimicrobiia"	Elusimicrobiales	Elusimicrobiaceae	"Ca. Fosiletta" Pallen, Rodriguez-R & Alikhan 2022
"Ca. Pseudelusimicrobium"	Mies et al. 2025	Elusimicrobiota	"Elusimicrobiia"	Elusimicrobiales	Elusimicrobiaceae	"Ca. Grisomana" Pallen, Rodriguez-R & Alikhan 2022
"Ca. Lloretia"	Gago et al. 2024	Elusimicrobiota	"Elusimicrobiia"	Elusimicrobiales	"Lloretiaceae"	
"Ca. Obscuribacterium"	Uzun et al. 2023	Elusimicrobiota	"Elusimicrobiia"	Obscuribacteriales	Obscuribacteriaceae	
"Ca. Ectomicrobium"	Mies & Brune 2024	Elusimicrobiota	Endomicrobiia	Endomicrobiales	Endomicrobiaceae	
"Ca. Endomicrobiellum"	Mies et al. 2024	Elusimicrobiota	Endomicrobiia	Endomicrobiales	Endomicrobiaceae	
Endomicrobium	Zheng et al. 2018	Elusimicrobiota	Endomicrobiia	Endomicrobiales	Endomicrobiaceae	
"Ca. Parendomicrobium"	Mies et al. 2024	Elusimicrobiota	Endomicrobiia	Endomicrobiales	Endomicrobiaceae	
"Ca. Praeruminimicrobium"	Mies & Brune 2024	Elusimicrobiota	Endomicrobiia	Endomicrobiales	Endomicrobiaceae	
"Ca. Proendomicrobium"	Mies & Brune 2024	Elusimicrobiota	Endomicrobiia	Endomicrobiales	Endomicrobiaceae	
"Ca. Proruminimicrobium"	Mies & Brune 2024	Elusimicrobiota	Endomicrobiia	Endomicrobiales	Endomicrobiaceae	
"Ca. Ruminimicrobiellum"	Mies & Brune 2024	Elusimicrobiota	Endomicrobiia	Endomicrobiales	Endomicrobiaceae	
"Ca. Ruminimicrobium"	Mies & Brune 2024	Elusimicrobiota	Endomicrobiia	Endomicrobiales	Endomicrobiaceae	
"Ca. Liberimonas"	Uzun et al. 2023	Elusimicrobiota	Endomicrobiia	Endomicrobiales	"Liberimonadaceae"	
"Ca. Allonella"	Peters et al. 2023	"Entotheonellota"				
"Ca. Entotheonella"	Schmidt et al. 2000	"Entotheonellota"	"Entotheonellia"	"Entotheonellales"	"Entotheonellaceae"	
"Ca. Prasianella"	Peters et al. 2023	"Entotheonellota"	"Entotheonellia"	"Entotheonellales"	"Entotheonellaceae"	
"Ca. Proxinella"	Dell et al. 2025	"Entotheonellota"	"Entotheonellia"	"Entotheonellales"	"Entotheonellaceae"	
"Ca. Thalassonella"	Peters et al. 2023	"Entotheonellota"	"Entotheonellia"	"Entotheonellales"	"Entotheonellaceae"	
"Ca. Aegiribacteria"	Hamilton et al. 2016	"Fermentibacterota"	"Fermentibacteria"	"Fermentibacterales"	"Fermentibacteraceae"	MLS_C
"Ca. Fermentibacter"	Kirkegaard 2016	"Fermentibacterota"	"Fermentibacteria"	"Fermentibacterales"	"Fermentibacteraceae"	
"Ca. Sabulitectum"	Saad et al. 2017	"Fermentibacterota"	"Fermentibacteria"	"Fermentibacterales"	"Fermentibacteraceae"	
"Cellulosispirillum"	Sorokin et al. 2016	Fibrobacterota	Chitinivibrionia	Chitinivibrionales	Chitinispirillaceae	
Chitinispirillum	Sorokin et al. 2016	Fibrobacterota	Chitinivibrionia	Chitinivibrionales	Chitinispirillaceae	
Chitinivibrio	Sorokin et al. 2014	Fibrobacterota	Chitinivibrionia	Chitinivibrionales	Chitinivibrionaceae	
Fibrobacter	Montgomery et al. 1988	Fibrobacterota	Fibrobacteria	Fibrobacterales	Fibrobacteraceae	
"Ca. Fibromonas"	Abdul Rahman et al. 2016	Fibrobacterota	Fibrobacteria	Fibrobacterales	Fibrobacteraceae	
"Hallerella"	Wylensek et al. 2020	Fibrobacterota	Fibrobacteria	Fibrobacterales	Fibrobacteraceae	
"Ca. Neomarinimicrobium"	corrig. Rinke et al. 2013	Fidelibacterota				"Ca. Marinimicrobium" Rinke et al. 2013 non Lim et al. 2006
Fidelibacter	Katayama et al. 2024	Fidelibacterota	Fidelibacteria	Fidelibacterales	Fidelibacteraceae	
"Ca. Marinisoma"	corrig. Rinke et al. 2013	Fidelibacterota	"Marinisomatia"	"Marinisomatales"	"Marinisomataceae"	
Cetobacterium	Foster et al. 1996	Fusobacteriota	Fusobacteriia	Fusobacteriales	Fusobacteriaceae	
Fusobacterium	Knorr 1922	Fusobacteriota	Fusobacteriia	Fusobacteriales	Fusobacteriaceae	"Distasoa" Pribram 1929; "Necrobacterium" Lahelle & Thjotta 1945; "Sphaerocillus" corrig. Prévot 1938; "Sphaerophorus" Prévot 1938 non Persoon 1794 non Gray 1864
Hypnocyclicus	Roalkvam et al. 2015	Fusobacteriota	Fusobacteriia	Fusobacteriales	Fusobacteriaceae	
Ilyobacter	Stieb & Schink 1985	Fusobacteriota	Fusobacteriia	Fusobacteriales	Fusobacteriaceae	
Piscibacter	Takeuchi & Sugahara 2025	Fusobacteriota	Fusobacteriia	Fusobacteriales	Fusobacteriaceae	
Propionigenium	Schink & Pfennig 1983	Fusobacteriota	Fusobacteriia	Fusobacteriales	Fusobacteriaceae	
Psychrilyobacter	Zhao et al. 2009	Fusobacteriota	Fusobacteriia	Fusobacteriales	Fusobacteriaceae	
Haliovirga	Miyazaki et al. 2023	Fusobacteriota	Fusobacteriia	Fusobacteriales	Haliovirgaceae	
Caviibacter	Eisenberg et al. 2016	Fusobacteriota	Fusobacteriia	Fusobacteriales	Leptotrichiaceae	
Leptotrichia	Trevisan 1879	Fusobacteriota	Fusobacteriia	Fusobacteriales	Leptotrichiaceae	"Ophryothrix" Borzi 1878; "Rasmussenia" De Toni & Trevisan 1889; "Syncrotis" Enderlein 1917
Oceanivirga	Eisenberg et al. 2016	Fusobacteriota	Fusobacteriia	Fusobacteriales	Leptotrichiaceae	
Pseudoleptotrichia	Eisenberg et al. 2020	Fusobacteriota	Fusobacteriia	Fusobacteriales	Leptotrichiaceae	
Pseudostreptobacillus	Eisenberg et al. 2020	Fusobacteriota	Fusobacteriia	Fusobacteriales	Leptotrichiaceae	
Sebaldella	Collins & Shah 1986	Fusobacteriota	Fusobacteriia	Fusobacteriales	Leptotrichiaceae	
Sneathia	Collins et al. 2002	Fusobacteriota	Fusobacteriia	Fusobacteriales	Leptotrichiaceae	
Streptobacillus	Levaditi, Nicolau & Poincloux 1925 non Rist & Khoury 1902 non Ueke 1898	Fusobacteriota	Fusobacteriia	Fusobacteriales	Leptotrichiaceae	"Bactepneumonia" Tulasne & Brisou 1955; "Haverhillia" Parker & Hudson 1926
"Cryogemmata"	Tan et al. 2026	Gemmatimonadota	Gemmatimonadia	"Cryogemmatales"	"Cryogemmataceae"	
Gemmatimonas	Zhang et al. 2003	Gemmatimonadota	Gemmatimonadia	Gemmatimonadales	Gemmatimonadaceae	
Gemmatirosa	DeBruyn et al. 2013	Gemmatimonadota	Gemmatimonadia	Gemmatimonadales	Gemmatimonadaceae	
Leucogemmata	Suzuki et al. 2026	Gemmatimonadota	Gemmatimonadia	Gemmatimonadales	Gemmatimonadaceae	
"Pseudogemmatithrix"	Haufschild et al. 2024	Gemmatimonadota	Gemmatimonadia	Gemmatimonadales	Gemmatimonadaceae	
Roseisolibacter	Pascual et al. 2018	Gemmatimonadota	Gemmatimonadia	Gemmatimonadales	Gemmatimonadaceae	
Gaopeijia	Ye et al. 2025	Gemmatimonadota	Gemmatimonadia	Longimicrobiales	Gaopeijiaceae	
Longimicrobium	Pascual et al. 2016	Gemmatimonadota	Gemmatimonadia	Longimicrobiales	Longimicrobiaceae	
"Ca. Terrihalomicrobium"	Galisteo et al. 2026	Gemmatimonadota	Gemmatimonadia	Longimicrobiales	Longimicrobiaceae	
"Ca. Indicimonas"	Aldeguer-Riquelme, Antón & Santos 2023	Gemmatimonadota	Gemmatimonadia	"Palauibacterales"	KS3-K002	
"Ca. Kutchimonas"	Aldeguer-Riquelme, Antón & Santos 2023	Gemmatimonadota	Gemmatimonadia	"Palauibacterales"	KS3-K002	
"Ca. Benthicola"	Aldeguer-Riquelme, Antón & Santos 2023	Gemmatimonadota	Gemmatimonadia	"Palauibacterales"	"Palauibacteraceae"	
"Ca. Caribbeanibacter"	Aldeguer-Riquelme, Antón & Santos 2023	Gemmatimonadota	Gemmatimonadia	"Palauibacterales"	"Palauibacteraceae"	
"Ca. Carthagonibacter"	Aldeguer-Riquelme, Antón & Santos 2023	Gemmatimonadota	Gemmatimonadia	"Palauibacterales"	"Palauibacteraceae"	
"Ca. Humimonas"	Aldeguer-Riquelme, Antón & Santos 2023	Gemmatimonadota	Gemmatimonadia	"Palauibacterales"	"Palauibacteraceae"	
"Ca. Palauibacter"	Aldeguer-Riquelme, Antón & Santos 2023	Gemmatimonadota	Gemmatimonadia	"Palauibacterales"	"Palauibacteraceae"	
"Aquadaptatus"	Zhang et al. 2026	"Gonggongibacterota"	"Gonggongibacteria"	"Gonggongibacterales"	"Gonggongibacteraceae"	
"Gonggongibacter"	Zhang et al. 2026	"Gonggongibacterota"	"Gonggongibacteria"	"Gonggongibacterales"	"Gonggongibacteraceae"	
"Hydrothermincola"	Zhang et al. 2026	"Gonggongibacterota"	"Gonggongibacteria"	"Hydrothermincolales"	"Hydrothermincolaceae"	
"Krenocultor"	Zhang et al. 2026	"Gonggongibacterota"	"Gonggongibacteria"	"Hydrothermincolales"	"Krenocultoraceae"	
"Ca. Heilongia"	Zhang et al. 2022	"Heilongiota"	"Heilongiia"	"Heilongiales"	"Heilongiaceae"	
"Ca. Hinthialibacter"	Williams et al. 2022	"Hinthialibacterota"	"Hinthialibacteria"	"Hinthialibacterales"	"Hinthialibacteraceae"	
"Ca. Hydrogenedens"	Rinke et al. 2013	"Hydrogenedentota"	"Hydrogenedentia"	"Hydrogenedentales"	"Hydrogenedentaceae"	
"Ca. Effluvibates"	Su et al. 2024	"Joyebacterota"	"Joyebacterpa"	"Joyebacterales"	"Effluvivivacaceae"	
"Ca. Effluvivivax"	Su et al. 2024	"Joyebacterota"	"Joyebacterpa"	"Joyebacterales"	"Effluvivivacaceae"	
"Ca. Joyebacterum"	Gong et al. 2022	"Joyebacterota"	"Joyebacterpa"	"Joyebacterales"	"Joyebacteraceae"	
"Ca. Krumholzibacterium"	Youssef et al. 2019	"Krumholzibacteriota"	"Krumholzibacteriia"	"Krumholzibacteriales"	"Krumholzibacteriaceae"	
"Ca. Latescibacter"	Rinke et al. 2013	"Latescibacterota"	"Latescibacteria"	"Latescibacterales"	"Latescibacteraceae"	
"Ca. Alcyoniella"	Williams et al. 2022	"Lernaellota"	"Lernaellia"	JAVCCG01	"Alcyoniellaceae"	
"Ca. Lernaella"	Williams et al. 2022	"Lernaellota"	"Lernaellia"	"Lernaellales"	"Lernaellaceae"	"Ca. Podoxia noxarana" Pallen, Rodriguez-R & Alikhan 2022
"Ca. Macinerneyibacterium"	corrig. Yadav et al. 2020	"Macinerneyibacteriota"	"Macinerneyibacteria"	"Macinerneyibacteriales"	"Macinerneyibacteriaceae"	
"Ca. Ruthmannia"	Gruber-Vodicka et al. 2019	"Margulisiibacteriota"	"Marinimargulisiibacteriia"			
"Ca. Termititenax"	Utami et al. 2019	"Margulisiibacteriota"	"Termititenacia"	"Termititenacales"	"Termititenacaceae"	
"Ca. Methylomirabilis"	Ettwig et al. 2010	"Methylomirabilota"	"Methylomirabilia"	"Methylomirabilales"	"Methylomirabilaceae"	
"Ca. Absconditicoccus"	Yakimov et al. 2022	Minisyncoccota	"Gracilibacteria"	"Absconditabacterales"	"Absconditicoccaceae"	
"Ca. Strigamonas"	Bouderka et al. 2024	Minisyncoccota	"Gracilibacteria"	"Absconditabacterales"	"Absconditicoccaceae"	
"Ca. Vampirococcus"	Guerrero et al. 1986 non Kizina 2017	Minisyncoccota	"Gracilibacteria"	"Absconditabacterales"	"Absconditicoccaceae"	
"Ca. Altimarinus"	Rinke et al. 2013	Minisyncoccota	"Gracilibacteria"	BD1-5	UBA6164	
"Ca. Peribacter"	Anantharaman et al. 2016	Minisyncoccota	"Gracilibacteria"	"Peribacterales"	"Peribacteraceae"	
"Ca. Chazhemtonibacterium"	corrig. Kadnikov et al. 2020	Minisyncoccota	"Microgenomatia"	"Chazhemtonibacteriales"	"Chazhemtonibacteriaceae"	
"Ca. Microgenomatus"	Rinke et al. 2013	Minisyncoccota	"Microgenomatia"	"Microgenomatales"	"Microgenomataceae"	
"Roizmanbacterium"	Geesink et al. 2020	Minisyncoccota	"Microgenomatia"	"Roizmanbacterales"		
"Nanosomnibacter"	Tan et al. 2026	Minisyncoccota	"Nanosomnibacteria"	"Nanosomnibacterales"	"Nanosomnibacteraceae"	
"Ca. Niblixella"	Pallen, Rodriguez-R & Alikhan 2022	Minisyncoccota	Minisyncoccia	"Moranbacterales"	"Fipalanaceae"	
"Ca. Microsyncoccus"	Kuroda et al. 2024	Minisyncoccota	Minisyncoccia	Minisyncoccales	Minisyncoccaceae	
Minisyncoccus	Kuroda et al. 2024	Minisyncoccota	Minisyncoccia	Minisyncoccales	Minisyncoccaceae	
"Ca. Paceibacter"	Rinke et al. 2013	Minisyncoccota	Minisyncoccia	Minisyncoccales	"Paceibacteraceae"	
"Ca. Sonnebornia"	Gong et al. 2014	Minisyncoccota	Minisyncoccia	Minisyncoccales	"Paceibacteraceae"	
"Ca. Parcunitrobacter"	corrig. Castelle et al. 2017	Minisyncoccota	Minisyncoccia	"Parcunitrobacterales"	"Parcunitrobacteraceae"	
"Ca. Minusculum"	Jonas et al. 2025	Minisyncoccota	Minisyncoccia	"Phycocordibacterales"	"Phycocordibacteraceae"	
"Ca. Phycocordibacter"	Jonas et al. 2025	Minisyncoccota	Minisyncoccia	"Phycocordibacterales"	"Phycocordibacteraceae"	
"Ca. Yanofskyibacterium"	Kuroda et al. 2024	Minisyncoccota	Minisyncoccia	"Yanofskybacterales"	"Yanofskyibacteriaceae"	
"Ca. Lutisaccharimonas"	Hu et al. 2026	Minisyncoccota	Nanosynbacteria	Nanosynbacterales	"Lutisaccharimonadaceae"	
"Ca. Nanosynsaccharibacterium"	corrig. McLean et al. 2020	Minisyncoccota	Nanosynbacteria	Nanosynbacterales	Nanosynbacteraceae	
"Ca. Chaera"	corrig. Lemos et al. 2019	Minisyncoccota	Nanosynbacteria	Nanosynbacterales	Nanosynbacteraceae	
"Ca. Microsaccharimonas"	corrig. Lemos et al. 2019	Minisyncoccota	Nanosynbacteria	Nanosynbacterales	Nanosynbacteraceae	"Ca. Saccharibacter" Lemos et al. 2019 non Jojima et al. 2004
"Ca. Mycolatisynbacter"	corrig. Batinovic et al. 2021	Minisyncoccota	Nanosynbacteria	Nanosynbacterales	Nanosynbacteraceae	"Ca. Mycosynbacter" Batinovic et al. 2021
"Ca. Nanogingivalis"	McLean et al. 2020	Minisyncoccota	Nanosynbacteria	Nanosynbacterales	Nanosynbacteraceae	
"Ca. Nanoperiodontomorbus"	corrig. McLean et al. 2020	Minisyncoccota	Nanosynbacteria	Nanosynbacterales	Nanosynbacteraceae	
Nanosynbacter	Hendrickson et al. 2026	Minisyncoccota	Nanosynbacteria	Nanosynbacterales	Nanosynbacteraceae	"Ca. Minimicrobia" Ibrahim et al. 2021
"Ca. Nanosyncoccus"	McLean et al. 2020	Minisyncoccota	Nanosynbacteria	Nanosynbacterales	Nanosynbacteraceae	
"Ca. Saccharimonas"	Albertsen et al. 2013	Minisyncoccota	Nanosynbacteria	Nanosynbacterales	Nanosynbacteraceae	"Ca. Southlakia" Wang et al. 2023
"Ca. Parviputeicola"	Wang et al. 2026	Minisyncoccota	Nanosynbacteria	Nanosynbacterales	"Parviputeicolaceae"	
"Ca. Parviradicicola"	Wang et al. 2026	Minisyncoccota	Nanosynbacteria	Parviradicicolales	"Parviradicicolaceae"	
"Ca. Patescibacterium"	Dutkiewicz et al. 2025	Minisyncoccota	"Patescibacteriia"	"Patescibacteriales"	"Patescibacteriaceae"	
"Ca. Wirthibacter"	Probst et al. 2017	Minisyncoccota	"Wirthbacteria"			
"Ca. Moduliflexus"	Sekiguchi et al. 2015	"Moduliflexota"	"Moduliflexia"	"Moduliflexales"	"Moduliflexaceae"	
"Ca. Vecturithrix"	Sekiguchi et al. 2015	"Moduliflexota"	"Moduliflexia"	"Moduliflexales"	"Moduliflexaceae"	
"Ca. Muiribacterium"	corrig. Barnum et al. 2018	"Muiribacteriota"	"Muiribacteriia"	"Muiribacteriales"	"Muiribacteriaceae"	
"Ca. Ozemibacter"	corrig. Kadnikov et al. 2018	"Muiribacteriota"	"Ozemibacteria"	"Ozemibacterales"	"Ozemibacteraceae"	
"Ca. Rifleibacterium"	Kadnikov et al. 2020	"Muiribacteriota"	"Ozemibacteria"	"Ozemibacterales"	"Ozemibacteraceae"	
"Myxomicrobium"	Castellani 1964	Myxococcota				
"Ca. Xihelimnomonas"	Li et al. 2023	Myxococcota				
"Ca. Xihepedomonas"	Li et al. 2023	Myxococcota				
Bradymonas	Wang et al. 2015	Myxococcota	Bradymonadia	Bradymonadales	Bradymonadaceae	
Lujinxingia	Guo et al. 2019	Myxococcota	Bradymonadia	Bradymonadales	Bradymonadaceae	
Allomicrovenator	Deshmukh et al. 2026	Myxococcota	Bradymonadia	Bradymonadales	Bradymonadaceae	Microvenator Wang, Chen & Du 2022 non Ostrom 1970
Persicimonas	Wang, Mu & Du 2022	Myxococcota	Bradymonadia	Bradymonadales	Bradymonadaceae	
"Ca. Kuafubacterium"	Li et al. 2023	Myxococcota	"Kuafubacteriia"	"Kuafubacteriales"	"Kuafubacteriaceae"	
"Ca. Kuafucaenimonas"	Li et al. 2023	Myxococcota	"Kuafubacteriia"	"Kuafubacteriales"	"Kuafubacteriaceae"	
"Ca. Kuafuhalomonas"	Li et al. 2023	Myxococcota	"Kuafubacteriia"	"Kuafubacteriales"	"Kuafubacteriaceae"	
"Ca. Photomyxococcus"	Marter et al. 2026	Myxococcota	"Kuafubacteriia"	"Kuafubacteriales"	"Kuafubacteriaceae"	
Anaeromyxobacter	Sanford et al. 2002	Myxococcota	Myxococcia	Myxococcales	Anaeromyxobacteraceae	
Aggregicoccus	Sood et al. 2015	Myxococcota	Myxococcia	Myxococcales	Myxococcaceae	
Archangium	Jahn et al. 1924	Myxococcota	Myxococcia	Myxococcales	Myxococcaceae	Angiococcus Jahn 1924 ex Hook, Larkin & Brockman 1980
Citreicoccus	Zhou et al. 2022	Myxococcota	Myxococcia	Myxococcales	Myxococcaceae	
Corallococcus	Reichenbach 2007	Myxococcota	Myxococcia	Myxococcales	Myxococcaceae	"Chondrococcus" Jahn 1924 non Kützing 1847; "Dactylocoena" Enderlein 1924; "Monocystia" Enderlein 1924
Cystobacter	Schroeter 1886	Myxococcota	Myxococcia	Myxococcales	Myxococcaceae	Melittangium Jahn 1924
Hyalangium	Reichenbach 2007	Myxococcota	Myxococcia	Myxococcales	Myxococcaceae	Allostigmatella Kostovski & Oren 2026; "Podangium" Jahn 1924; "Polycephalum" Kalchbrenner & Cooke 1880; Stigmatella Berkeley & Curtis 1875
Myxococcus	Thaxter 1892 non Gonnermann 1907	Myxococcota	Myxococcia	Myxococcales	Myxococcaceae	Pyxidicoccus corrig. Reichenbach 2007; "Pseudomyxococcus" Das et al. 2025
Simulacricoccus	Garcia & Muller 2018	Myxococcota	Myxococcia	Myxococcales	Myxococcaceae	
Vitiosangium	Awal et al. 2017	Myxococcota	Myxococcia	Myxococcales	Myxococcaceae	
"Ca. Xihecaenimonas"	Li et al. 2023	Myxococcota	Myxococcia	Myxococcales	Myxococcaceae	
"Ca. Xihelimnobacterium"	Li et al. 2023	Myxococcota	Myxococcia	Myxococcales	Myxococcaceae	
"Ca. Xihemicrobium"	Li et al. 2023	Myxococcota	Myxococcota	Myxococcales	Myxococcaceae	
Vulgatibacter	Yamamoto, Muramatsu & Nagai 2014	Myxococcota	Myxococcia	Myxococcales	Vulgatibacteraceae	
Haliangium	Fudou et al. 2002	Myxococcota	Polyangia	Haliangiales	Haliangiaceae	
Kofleria	Kofler 1913	Myxococcota	Polyangia	Haliangiales	Haliangiaceae	
Enhygromyxa	Iizuka et al. 2003	Myxococcota	Polyangia	Nannocystales	Nannocystaceae	
Nannocystis	Reichenbach 1970	Myxococcota	Polyangia	Nannocystales	Nannocystaceae	
"Ca. Niobacter"	Tanuku et al. 2026	Myxococcota	Polyangia	Nannocystales	Nannocystaceae	
"Paraliomyxa"	Iizuka et al. 2006	Myxococcota	Polyangiia	Nannocystales	Nannocystaceae	
Plesiocystis	Iizuka et al. 2003	Myxococcota	Polyangia	Nannocystales	Nannocystaceae	
Pseudenhygromyxa	Iizuka et al. 2013	Myxococcota	Polyangia	Nannocystales	Nannocystaceae	
"Ca. Xihebacterium"	Li et al. 2023	Myxococcota	Polyangia	Nannocystales	Nannocystaceae	
"Ca. Houyihalomonas"	Li et al. 2023	Myxococcota	Polyangiia	Polyangiales	DAPKRP01	
"Ca. Neutrinellum"	Tarasov et al. 2026	Myxococcota	Polyangiia	Polyangiales	JBDIVX01	
"Ca. Houyibacterium"	Li et al. 2023	Myxococcota	Polyangiia	Polyangiales	"Houyibacteriaceae"	
Aetherobacter	Garcia et al. 2016	Myxococcota	Polyangia	Polyangiales	Polyangiaceae	
Byssovorax	Thaxter 1897 ex Reichenbach 2006	Myxococcota	Polyangia	Polyangiales	Polyangiaceae	"Byssophaga" Reichenbach 2005 non Stretch 1872
Chondromyces	Berkeley & Curtis 1874	Myxococcota	Polyangia	Polyangiales	Polyangiaceae	"Cystodesmia" Enderlein 1924; "Myxobotrys" Zukal 1896; "Ophiocystia" Enderlein 1924
Jahnella	corrig. Jahn 1924 ex Reichenbach 2007	Myxococcota	Polyangia	Polyangiales	Polyangiaceae	"Jahnia" Reichenbach 2005
Labilithrix	Yamamoto, Muramatsu & Nagai 2014	Myxococcota	Polyangia	Polyangiales	Polyangiaceae	
Minicystis	Garcia, Gemperlein & Muller 2014	Myxococcota	Polyangia	Polyangiales	Polyangiaceae	
"Pajaroellobacter"	Clothier & Anderson 2016	Myxococcota	Polyangia	Polyangiales	Polyangiaceae	
"Pendulispora"	Garcia et al. 2024 non Ellis 1961	Myxococcota	Polyangia	Polyangiales	Polyangiaceae	
Phaselicystis	Garcia et al. 2009	Myxococcota	Polyangia	Polyangiales	Polyangiaceae	
Polyangium	Link 1809	Myxococcota	Polyangia	Polyangiales	Polyangiaceae	"Cystoecemia" Enderlein 1924; "Haploangium" (sic) Peterson 1959 ex Reichenbach 2005; "Myxobacter" Thaxter 1892
Racemicystis	Awal, Garcia & Muller 2016	Myxococcota	Polyangia	Polyangiales	Polyangiaceae	
Sorangium	Jahn 1924 ex Reichenbach 2007	Myxococcota	Polyangia	Polyangiales	Polyangiaceae	
"Ca. Xihecaenibacterium"	Li et al. 2023	Myxococcota	Polyangia	Polyangiales	Polyangiaceae	
"Ca. Xihemonas"	Li et al. 2023	Myxococcota	Polyangia	Polyangiales	Polyangiaceae	
Sandaracinus	Mohr et al. 2012	Myxococcota	Polyangia	Polyangiales	Sandaracinaceae	
"Ca. Xihehalomonas"	Li et al. 2023	Myxococcota	Polyangiia	Polyangiales	Sandaracinaceae	
"Ca. Nitrosediminicola"	Zhao, Jorgensen & Babbin 2024	"Nitrosediminicolota"				
"Ca. Nitrohelix"	Mueller et al. 2021	Nitrospinota	Nitrospinia	Nitrospinales	VA-1	
"Ca. Nitromaricola"	Stuehrenberg et al. 2026	Nitrospinota	Nitrospinia	Nitrospinales	VA-1	
"Ca. Nitromaritima"	Ngugi et al. 2016	Nitrospinota	Nitrospinia	Nitrospinales	VA-1	
"Ca. Nitronauta"	Mueller et al. 2021	Nitrospinota	Nitrospinia	Nitrospinales	Nitrospinaceae	
Nitrospina	Watson & Waterbury 1971	Nitrospinota	Nitrospinia	Nitrospinales	Nitrospinaceae	
"Ca. Thermomagnetovibrio"	Lefèvre et al. 2010	Nitrospirota				
Leptospirillum	Markosyan 1972 ex Hippe 2000	Nitrospirota	Leptospirillia	Leptospirillales	Leptospirillaceae	
"Ca. Manganitrophus"	Yu & Leadbetter 2020	Nitrospirota	Nitrospiria	"Troglogloeales"	"Manganitrophaceae"	
"Ca. Troglogloea"	corrig. Kostanjsek et al. 2013	Nitrospirota	Nitrospiria	"Troglogloeales"	"Troglogloeaceae"	
"Ca. Inrsubterrania"	Tarasov et al. 2026	Nitrospirota	Nitrospiria	Nitrospirales	UBA8639	
"Ca. Nitronereus"	Mueller et al. 2023	Nitrospirota	Nitrospiria	Nitrospirales	UBA8639	
"Ca. Nitronatura"	Singleton et al. 2025	Nitrospirota	Nitrospiria	Nitrospirales	Nitrospiraceae	
Nitrospira	Watson et al. 1986	Nitrospirota	Nitrospiria	Nitrospirales	Nitrospiraceae	
"Ca. Nitrosymbion"	Glasl et al. 2024	Nitrospirota	Nitrospiria	Nitrospirales	Nitrospiraceae	
"Ca. Porinitrospira"	Taylor et al. 2022	Nitrospirota	Nitrospiria	Nitrospirales	Nitrospiraceae	
"Ca. Arenidesulfomonas"	Piontek et al. 2026	Nitrospirota	Thermodesulfovibrionia	"Arenidesulfomonadales"	"Arenidesulfomonadaceae"	
"Ca. Mariimomonas"	Yoon et al. 2023	Nitrospirota	Thermodesulfovibrionia	"Mariimomonadales"	"Mariimomonadaceae"	
Dissulfurispira	Umezawa et al. 2021	Nitrospirota	Thermodesulfovibrionia	Thermodesulfovibrionales	Dissulfurispiraceae	
"Ca. Nitrobium"	Arshad et al. 2017	Nitrospirota	Thermodesulfovibrionia	Thermodesulfovibrionales	Dissulfurispiraceae	
"Ca. Magnetobacterium"	Spring et al. 1993	Nitrospirota	Thermodesulfovibrionia	Thermodesulfovibrionales	"Magnetobacteriaceae"	
"Ca. Magnetocorallium"	Zhao et al. 2023	Nitrospirota	Thermodesulfovibrionia	Thermodesulfovibrionales	"Magnetobacteriaceae"	
"Ca. Magnetomicrobium"	Zhang et al. 2021	Nitrospirota	Thermodesulfovibrionia	Thermodesulfovibrionales	"Magnetobacteriaceae"	
"Ca. Magnetominusculus"	Lin et al. 2017	Nitrospirota	Thermodesulfovibrionia	Thermodesulfovibrionales	"Magnetobacteriaceae"	
"Ca. Magnetomonas"	Uzun et al. 2022	Nitrospirota	Thermodesulfovibrionia	Thermodesulfovibrionales	"Magnetobacteriaceae"	
"Ca. Magnetovum"	corrig. Lefevre et al. 2011	Nitrospirota	Thermodesulfovibrionia	Thermodesulfovibrionales	"Magnetobacteriaceae"	
"Ca. Sulfobium"	Zecchin et al. 2018	Nitrospirota	Thermodesulfovibrionia	Thermodesulfovibrionales	"Sulfobiaceae"	
Thermodesulfovibrio	Henry et al. 1994	Nitrospirota	Thermodesulfovibrionia	Thermodesulfovibrionales	Thermodesulfovibrionaceae	
"Muellerivita"	Sereika et al. 2025	"Oederibacteriota"	"Muellerivitia"	"Muellerivitales"	"Muellerivitaceae"	
"Oederibacterium"	Sereika et al. 2025	"Oederibacteriota"	"Oederibacteriia"	"Oederibacteriales"	"Oederibacteriaceae"	
"Ca. Cellulosimonas"	Doud et al. 2020	"Oederibacteriota"	PGYV01	PGYV01	PGYV01	
Oligoflexus	Nakai et al. 2014	"Oligoflexaeota"	Oligoflexia	Oligoflexales	Oligoflexaceae	
Pseudobacteriovorax	McCauley, Haltli & Kerr 2015	"Oligoflexaeota"	Oligoflexia	Oligoflexales	Oligoflexaceae	
"Ca. Turbibacter"	corrig. Dirren & Posch 2016	"Oligoflexaeota"	Oligoflexia	Silvanigrellales	Silvanigrellaceae	
Silvanigrella	Hahn et al. 2017	"Oligoflexaeota"	Oligoflexia	Silvanigrellales	Silvanigrellaceae	Fluviispira Pitt et al. 2020; "Pigmentibacter" Peng et al. 2021; "Ca. Spirobacillus" Metchnikoff 1889 ex Bresciani et al. 2018
"Ca. Abzuiibacterium"	Seymour et al. 2022	"Omnitrophota"	"Omnitrophia"	"Omnitrophales"	"Abzuiibacteriaceae"	
"Ca. Aquincolibacterium"	Seymour et al. 2022	"Omnitrophota"	"Omnitrophia"	"Omnitrophales"	"Aquincolibacteriaceae"	
"Ca. Multiplicimicrobium"	Seymour et al. 2022	"Omnitrophota"	"Omnitrophia"	"Omnitrophales"	"Aquincolibacteriaceae"	
"Ca. Pegaeibacterium"	Seymour et al. 2022	"Omnitrophota"	"Omnitrophia"	"Omnitrophales"	"Aquincolibacteriaceae"	
"Ca. Taenariivivens"	Seymour et al. 2022	"Omnitrophota"	"Omnitrophia"	"Omnitrophales"	"Aquincolibacteriaceae"	
"Ca. Danuiimicrobium"	Seymour et al. 2022	"Omnitrophota"	"Omnitrophia"	"Omnitrophales"	"Danuiimicrobiaceae"	
"Ca. Omnitrophus"	Rinke et al. 2013	"Omnitrophota"	"Omnitrophia"	"Omnitrophales"	"Omnitrophaceae"	
"Ca. Orphnella"	Williams et al. 2021	"Omnitrophota"	"Velamenicoccia"	JABMRG01	JABMRG01	
"Ca. Aquitaenariimonas"	Seymour et al. 2022	"Omnitrophota"	"Velamenicoccia"	"Aquitaenarimonadales"	"Aquitaenariimonadaceae"	
"Ca. Aquivivens"	Seymour et al. 2022	"Omnitrophota"	"Velamenicoccia"	"Aquiviventales"	"Aquiviventaceae"	
"Ca. Duberdicusella"	Seymour et al. 2022	"Omnitrophota"	"Velamenicoccia"	"Duberdicusellales"	"Duberdicusellaceae"	
"Ca. Susuluia"	corrig. Williams et al. 2021	"Omnitrophota"	"Velamenicoccia"	"Duberdicusellales"	"Duberdicusellaceae"	
"Ca. Ghiorseimicrobium"	Seymour et al. 2022	"Omnitrophota"	"Velamenicoccia"	"Ghiorseimicrobiales"	"Ghiorseimicrobiaceae"	
"Ca. Gorgyraea"	Williams et al. 2021	"Omnitrophota"	"Velamenicoccia"	"Gorgyraeales"	"Gorgyraeaceae"	
"Ca. Gygaeella"	corrig. Williams et al. 2021	"Omnitrophota"	"Velamenicoccia"	"Gygaeellales"	"Gygaeellaceae"	
"Ca. Amyimicrobium"	Seymour et al. 2023	"Omnitrophota"	"Velamenicoccia"	"Gygaeellales"	"Profunditerraquicolaceae"	
"Ca. Fontinolimonas"	Seymour et al. 2022	"Omnitrophota"	"Velamenicoccia"	"Gygaeellales"	"Profunditerraquicolaceae"	
"Ca. Profunditerraquicola"	Seymour et al. 2022	"Omnitrophota"	"Velamenicoccia"	"Gygaeellales"	"Profunditerraquicolaceae"	
"Ca. Sherwoodlollariibacterium"	Seymour et al. 2022	"Omnitrophota"	"Velamenicoccia"	"Gygaeellales"	"Profunditerraquicolaceae"	
"Ca. Undivivens"	Seymour et al. 2022	"Omnitrophota"	"Velamenicoccia"	"Gygaeellales"	"Profunditerraquicolaceae"	
"Ca. Kaelpia"	Williams et al. 2021	"Omnitrophota"	"Velamenicoccia"	"Kaelpiales"	"Kaelpiaceae"	
"Ca. Saelkia"	Williams et al. 2021	"Omnitrophota"	"Velamenicoccia"	"Kaelpiales"	"Kaelpiaceae"	
"Ca. Kappaea"	Williams et al. 2021	"Omnitrophota"	"Velamenicoccia"	"Kappaeales"	"Kappaeaceae"	
"Ca. Pluralincolimonas"	Seymour et al. 2022	"Omnitrophota"	"Velamenicoccia"	"Pluralincolimonadales"	"Pluralincolimonadaceae"	
"Ca. Taenaricola"	Seymour et al. 2022	"Omnitrophota"	"Velamenicoccia"	"Taenaricolales"	"Taenaricolaceae"	
"Ca. Aadella"	Williams et al. 2021	"Omnitrophota"	"Velamenicoccia"	"Tantalellales"	"Tantalellaceae"	
"Ca. Makaraimicrobium"	Seymour et al. 2022	"Omnitrophota"	"Velamenicoccia"	"Tantalellales"	"Tantalellaceae"	
"Ca. Tantalella"	Williams et al. 2021	"Omnitrophota"	"Velamenicoccia"	"Tantalellales"	"Tantalellaceae"	
"Ca. Thioglobulicalix"	Seymour et al. 2022	"Omnitrophota"	"Velamenicoccia"	"Tantalellales"	"Tantalellaceae"	
"Ca. Phelpsiimicrobium"	Seymour et al. 2022	"Omnitrophota"	"Velamenicoccia"	"Velamenicoccales"	"Velamenicoccaceae"	
"Ca. Velamenicoccus"	Kizina et al. 2022	"Omnitrophota"	"Velamenicoccia"	"Velamenicoccales"	"Velamenicoccaceae"	"Vampirococcus" Kizina 2017 non Guerrero et al. 1986
"Ca. Velesiimonas"	Seymour et al. 2022	"Omnitrophota"	"Velamenicoccia"	"Velesiimonadales"	"Velesiimonadaceae"	
"Ca. Aceella"	corrig. Williams et al. 2021	"Omnitrophota"	"Velamenicoccia"	"Zapsychrales"	"Aceulaceae" (sic)	
"Ca. Fredricksoniimonas"	Seymour et al. 2022	"Omnitrophota"	"Velamenicoccia"	"Zapsychrales"	"Fredricksoniimonadaceae"	
"Ca. Zapsychrus"	Williams et al. 2021	"Omnitrophota"	"Velamenicoccia"	"Zapsychrales"	"Zapsychraceae"	
"Ca. Orphanbacterum"	Gong et al. 2022	"Orphanbacterota"	"Orphanbacteria"	"Orphanbacterales"	"Orphanbacteraceae"	
"Ca. Piabacter"	Vigneron et al. 2025	JAHJDO01	JAHJDO01			
"Ca. Brasilis"	Viancelli et al. 2011	Planctomycetota				
"Ca. Anammoxibacter"	Suarez et al. 2022	Planctomycetota	"Brocadiia"	"Brocadiales"	"Anammoxibacteraceae"	
"Ca. Avalokitesvara"	Wu et al. 2023	Planctomycetota	"Brocadiia"	"Brocadiales"	"Bathanammoxibiaceae"	
"Ca. Bathanammoxibius"	Zhao, Biddle & Jørgensen 2023	Planctomycetota	"Brocadiia"	"Brocadiales"	"Bathanammoxibiaceae"	
"Ca. Tathagata"	Wu et al. 2023	Planctomycetota	"Brocadiia"	"Brocadiales"	"Bathanammoxibiaceae"	
"Ca. Tripitaka"	Wu et al. 2023	Planctomycetota	"Brocadiia"	"Brocadiales"	"Bathanammoxibiaceae"	
"Ca. Anammoxiglobus"	corrig. Kartal et al. 2007	Planctomycetota	"Brocadiia"	"Brocadiales"	"Brocadiaceae"	
"Ca. Brocadia"	Strous 2000	Planctomycetota	"Brocadiia"	"Brocadiales"	"Brocadiaceae"	
"Ca. Frigussubterria"	Litti et al. 2024	Planctomycetota	"Brocadiia"	"Brocadiales"	"Brocadiaceae"	
"Ca. Jettenia"	Quan et al. 2008	Planctomycetota	"Brocadiia"	"Brocadiales"	"Brocadiaceae"	
"Ca. Jinrextremum"	Tarasov et al. 2026	Planctomycetota	"Brocadiia"	"Brocadiales"	"Brocadiaceae"	
"Ca. Kuenenia"	corrig. Schmid et al. 2000	Planctomycetota	"Brocadiia"	"Brocadiales"	"Brocadiaceae"	
"Ca. Loosdrechtia"	corrig. Yang et al. 2022	Planctomycetota	"Brocadiia"	"Brocadiales"	"Brocadiaceae"	
"Ca. Wujingus"	Wu et al. 2023	Planctomycetota	"Brocadiia"	"Brocadiales"	"Brocadiaceae"	
"Ca. Wunengus"	Wu et al. 2023	Planctomycetota	"Brocadiia"	"Brocadiales"	"Brocadiaceae"	
"Ca. Scalindua"	Schmid et al. 2003	Planctomycetota	"Brocadiia"	"Brocadiales"	"Scalinduaceae"	
"Ca. Subterrananammoxibius"	Zhao, Le Moine Bauer & Babbin 2023	Planctomycetota	"Brocadiia"	"Brocadiales"	"Subterrananammoxibiaceae"	
"Ca. Wukongus"	Wu et al. 2023	Planctomycetota	"Brocadiia"	"Wukongales"	"Wukongaceae"	
"Terrisphaera"	Ivanova et al. 2026 non Yoon, Lee & Park 2026	Planctomycetota	Phycisphaeria			
"Frigidisphaera"	Tan et al. 2026	Planctomycetota	Phycisphaeria	Phycisphaerales	"Frigidisphaeraceae"	
Algisphaera	Yoon, Jang & Kasai 2014	Planctomycetota	Phycisphaeria	Phycisphaerales	Phycisphaeraceae	
Mucisphaera	Kallscheuer et al. 2022	Planctomycetota	Phycisphaeria	Phycisphaerales	Phycisphaeraceae	
Natronomicrosphaera	Sorokin et al. 2025	Planctomycetota	Phycisphaeria	Phycisphaerales	Phycisphaeraceae	
Phycisphaera	Fukunaga et al.2010	Planctomycetota	Phycisphaeria	Phycisphaerales	Phycisphaeraceae	
Poriferisphaera	Kallscheuer et al. 2021	Planctomycetota	Phycisphaeria	Phycisphaerales	Phycisphaeraceae	
"Anaerobaca"	Khomyakova, Merkel & Slobodkin 2024	Planctomycetota	Phycisphaeria	Sedimentisphaerales	"Anaerobacaceae"	
"Anaeroglomus"	Khomyakova et al. 2026	Planctomycetota	Phycisphaeria	Sedimentisphaerales	Anaerohalosphaeraceae	
Anaerohalosphaera	Pradel et al. 2020	Planctomycetota	Phycisphaeria	Sedimentisphaerales	Anaerohalosphaeraceae	
Limihaloglobus	Pradel et al. 2020	Planctomycetota	Phycisphaeria	Sedimentisphaerales	Sedimentisphaeraceae	
Sedimentisphaera	Spring et al. 2018	Planctomycetota	Phycisphaeria	Sedimentisphaerales	Sedimentisphaeraceae	
Fontivita	Podosokorskaya et al. 2023	Planctomycetota	Phycisphaeria	Tepidisphaerales	Tepidisphaeraceae	
"Humisphaera"	Dedysh et al. 2021	Planctomycetota	Phycisphaeria	Tepidisphaerales	Tepidisphaeraceae	
Tepidisphaera	Kovaleva et al. 2015	Planctomycetota	Phycisphaeria	Tepidisphaerales	Tepidisphaeraceae	
"Cryolimnoglobus"	Tan et al. 2026	Planctomycetota	Planctomycetia	Gemmatales	Gemmataceae	
Fimbriiglobus	Kulichevskaya et al. 2017	Planctomycetota	Planctomycetia	Gemmatales	Gemmataceae	
Gemmata	Franzmann & Skerman 1985	Planctomycetota	Planctomycetia	Gemmatales	Gemmataceae	Frigoriglobus Kulichevskaya et al. 2021
Limnoglobus	Kulichevskaya et al. 2020	Planctomycetota	Planctomycetia	Gemmatales	Gemmataceae	
Telmatocola	Kulichevskaya et al. 2012	Planctomycetota	Planctomycetia	Gemmatales	Gemmataceae	
Thermogemmata	Elcheninov et al. 2021	Planctomycetota	Planctomycetia	Gemmatales	Gemmataceae	
Tuwongella	Seeger et al. 2017	Planctomycetota	Planctomycetia	Gemmatales	Gemmataceae	
Urbifossiella	Kallscheuer et al. 2021	Planctomycetota	Planctomycetia	Gemmatales	Gemmataceae	
Zavarzinella	Kulichevskaya et al. 2009	Planctomycetota	Planctomycetia	Gemmatales	Gemmataceae	
Aquisphaera	Bondoso et al. 2011	Planctomycetota	Planctomycetia	Isosphaerales	Isosphaeraceae	
Isosphaera	Woronichin 1927 ex Giovannoni, Schabtach &Castenholz 1995	Planctomycetota	Planctomycetia	Isosphaerales	Isosphaeraceae	
Kueselia	Kündgen et al. 2026	Planctomycetota	Planctomycetia	Isosphaerales	Isosphaeraceae	
"Ca. Nostocimimus"	Crook 2026	Planctomycetota	Planctomycetia	Isosphaerales	Isosphaeraceae	
Paludisphaera	Kulichevskaya et al. 2015	Planctomycetota	Planctomycetia	Isosphaerales	Isosphaeraceae	
Singulisphaera	Kulichevskaya et al. 2008	Planctomycetota	Planctomycetia	Isosphaerales	Isosphaeraceae	
Tautonia	Kovaleva et al. 2019	Planctomycetota	Planctomycetia	Isosphaerales	Isosphaeraceae	"Aeolisphaera" Wiegand et al. 2020
Tundrisphaera	Kulichevskaya et al. 2017	Planctomycetota	Planctomycetia	Isosphaerales	Isosphaeraceae	
"Kolteria"	Wiegand et al. 2020 ex Kallscheuer et al. 2025	Planctomycetota	Planctomycetia	"Kolteriales"	"Kolteriaceae"	
Adhaeretor	Wiegand et al. 2022	Planctomycetota	Planctomycetia	Pirellulales	Lacipirellulaceae	
Aeoliella	Wiegand et al. 2021	Planctomycetota	Planctomycetia	Pirellulales	Lacipirellulaceae	
Botrimarina	Wiegand et al. 2021	Planctomycetota	Planctomycetia	Pirellulales	Lacipirellulaceae	
Bythopirellula	Storesund & Ovreas 2021	Planctomycetota	Planctomycetia	Pirellulales	Lacipirellulaceae	
Lacipirellula	Dedysh et al. 2020	Planctomycetota	Planctomycetia	Pirellulales	Lacipirellulaceae	"Limnanthus" Wiegand et al. 2020 non Necker ex Jussieu 1823
Pirellulimonas	Wiegand et al. 2021	Planctomycetota	Planctomycetia	Pirellulales	Lacipirellulaceae	
Posidoniimonas	Kohn et al. 2020	Planctomycetota	Planctomycetia	Pirellulales	Lacipirellulaceae	
Pseudobythopirellula	Wiegand et al. 2021	Planctomycetota	Planctomycetia	Pirellulales	Lacipirellulaceae	
"Ca. Anammoximicrobium"	Khramenkov et al. 2013	Planctomycetota	Planctomycetia	Pirellulales	Pirellulaceae	
Anatilimnocola	Kallscheuer et al. 2022	Planctomycetota	Planctomycetia	Pirellulales	Pirellulaceae	
Aureliella	Kallscheuer et al. 2021	Planctomycetota	Planctomycetia	Pirellulales	Pirellulaceae	
Blastopirellula	Schlesner et al. 2004	Planctomycetota	Planctomycetia	Pirellulales	Pirellulaceae	
"Brakhagea"	Kumar et al. 2026	Planctomycetota	Planctomycetia	Pirellulales	Pirellulaceae	
Bremerella	Rensink et al. 2021	Planctomycetota	Planctomycetia	Pirellulales	Pirellulaceae	
Crateriforma	Peeters et al. 2021	Planctomycetota	Planctomycetia	Pirellulales	Pirellulaceae	
"Kothea"	Kumar et al. 2026	Planctomycetota	Planctomycetia	Pirellulales	Pirellulaceae	
"Ca. Laterigemmans"	Kumar et al. 2021	Planctomycetota	Planctomycetia	Pirellulales	Pirellulaceae	
Lignipirellula	Peeters et al. 2021	Planctomycetota	Planctomycetia	Pirellulales	Pirellulaceae	
Mariniblastus	Lage et al. 2017	Planctomycetota	Planctomycetia	Pirellulales	Pirellulaceae	
"Njordella"	Kumar et al. 2026	Planctomycetota	Planctomycetia	Pirellulales	Pirellulaceae	
Novipirellula	Kallscheuer et al. 2021	Planctomycetota	Planctomycetia	Pirellulales	Pirellulaceae	
Pirellula	Schlesner & Hirsch 1987	Planctomycetota	Planctomycetia	Pirellulales	Pirellulaceae	Pirella Schlesner & Hirsch 1984 non Bainier 1883
"Rania"	Kumar et al. 2026	Planctomycetota	Planctomycetia	Pirellulales	Pirellulaceae	
Rhodopirellula	Schlesner et al. 2004	Planctomycetota	Planctomycetia	Pirellulales	Pirellulaceae	Allorhodopirellula Sreya et al. 2023; Aporhodopirellula Sreya et al. 2023; Neorhodopirellula Sreya et al. 2023
Roseimaritima	Bondoso et al. 2016	Planctomycetota	Planctomycetia	Pirellulales	Pirellulaceae	
Rosistilla	Waqqas et al. 2021	Planctomycetota	Planctomycetia	Pirellulales	Pirellulaceae	
Rubripirellula	Bondoso et al. 2016	Planctomycetota	Planctomycetia	Pirellulales	Pirellulaceae	
Stieleria	Kallscheuer et al. 2021	Planctomycetota	Planctomycetia	Pirellulales	Pirellulaceae	"Roseiconus" Kumar et al. 2021
"Ca. Luxemburgiella"	Klimek et al. 2025	Planctomycetota	Planctomycetia	Pirellulales	Thermoguttaceae	
Thermogutta	Slobodkina et al. 2015	Planctomycetota	Planctomycetia	Pirellulales	Thermoguttaceae	
Thermostilla	Slobodkina et al. 2015	Planctomycetota	Planctomycetia	Pirellulales	Thermoguttaceae	
Alienimonas	Boersma et al. 2021	Planctomycetota	Planctomycetia	Planctomycetales	Planctomycetaceae	"Aliena" Wiegand et al. 2020
Calycomorphotria	Schubert et al. 2021	Planctomycetota	Planctomycetia	Planctomycetales	Planctomycetaceae	
Caulifigura	Kallscheuer et al. 2021	Planctomycetota	Planctomycetia	Planctomycetales	Planctomycetaceae	
Fuerstiella	Kohn et al. 2020	Planctomycetota	Planctomycetia	Planctomycetales	Planctomycetaceae	"Fuerstia" Kohn et al. 2016 non Fries 1929
Gimesia	Scheuner et al. 2015	Planctomycetota	Planctomycetia	Planctomycetales	Planctomycetaceae	
Lacunimicrobium	Kabuu et al. 2026	Planctomycetota	Planctomycetia	Planctomycetales	Planctomycetaceae	
Maioricimonas	Rivas-Marin et al. 2020	Planctomycetota	Planctomycetia	Planctomycetales	Planctomycetaceae	
Planctellipticum	corrig. Wurzbacher et al. 2024	Planctomycetota	Planctomycetia	Planctomycetales	Planctomycetaceae	
Planctomicrobium	Kulichevskaya et al. 2015	Planctomycetota	Planctomycetia	Planctomycetales	Planctomycetaceae	
Planctomyces	Gimesi 1924	Planctomycetota	Planctomycetia	Planctomycetales	Planctomycetaceae	"Acinothrix" Novácek 1938; "Blastocaulis" Henrici & Johnson 1935
Planctopirus	Scheuner et al. 2015	Planctomycetota	Planctomycetia	Planctomycetales	Planctomycetaceae	
Polystyrenella	Peeters et al. 2021	Planctomycetota	Planctomycetia	Planctomycetales	Planctomycetaceae	
"Rhodopilula"	Frank 2011	Planctomycetota	Planctomycetia	Planctomycetales	Planctomycetaceae	
Rubinisphaera	Scheuner et al. 2015	Planctomycetota	Planctomycetia	Planctomycetales	Planctomycetaceae	
Schlesneria	Kulichevskaya et al. 2007	Planctomycetota	Planctomycetia	Planctomycetales	Planctomycetaceae	
Stratiformator	Kumar et al. 2024	Planctomycetota	Planctomycetia	Planctomycetales	Planctomycetaceae	
Symmachiella	Salbreiter et al. 2020	Planctomycetota	Planctomycetia	Planctomycetales	Planctomycetaceae	
Thalassoglobus	Kohn et al. 2020	Planctomycetota	Planctomycetia	Planctomycetales	Planctomycetaceae	
Thalassoroseus	Kumar et al. 2022	Planctomycetota	Planctomycetia	Planctomycetales	Planctomycetaceae	
"Thermopirellula"	Liu et al. 2012	Planctomycetota	Planctomycetia	Planctomycetales	Planctomycetaceae	
"Engelhardtia"	Wiegand et al. 2019 non Barnes & Benjamin 1923 non Leschenault de la Tour ex von Blume 1825	Planctomycetota	"Saltatorellae"	"Saltatorellales"	"Saltatorellaceae"	
"Rohdeia"	Wiegand et al. 2019	Planctomycetota	"Saltatorellae"	"Saltatorellales"	"Saltatorellaceae"	
"Saltatorellus"	Wiegand et al. 2019	Planctomycetota	"Saltatorellae"	"Saltatorellales"	"Saltatorellaceae"	
"Ca. Uabimicrobium"	Lodha, Narvekar & Karodi 2021	Planctomycetota	"Uabimicrobiia"	"Uabimicrobiales"	"Uabimicrobiaceae"	
"Ca. Qinglongia"	Zhang et al. 2022	"Qinglongiota"	"Qinglongiia"	"Qinglongiales"	"Qinglongiaceae"	
"Ca. Ryujinia"	Sun et al. 2025	"Ryujiniota"	"Ryujiniia"	"Ryujiniales"	"Ryujiniaceae"	
"Ca. Salsurabacterium"	Gutiérrez-Preciado et al. 2024	"Salsurabacteriota"				
"Ca. Fungwabacter"	Vigneron et al. 2025	"Shingomicrobia"	SLGR01	SLGR01	PWQF01	
"Ca. Vouabacter"	Vigneron et al. 2025	"Shingomicrobia"	SLGR01	SLGR01	SLGR01	
"Spirosymplokos"	Guerrero et al. 1993	Spirochaetota				
Brachyspira	Hovind-Hougen et al. 1983	Spirochaetota	Brachyspiria	Brachyspirales	Brachyspiraceae	"Anguillina" Lee et al. 1993 non Cossmann 1912 non Hammerschmidt 1839; Serpula Stanton et al. 1991 non (Persson 1801) Gray 1821 non von Linné 1758 non Coy 1862; Serpulina Stanton 1992 non Zborzevski 1834
"Ca. Maribrachyspira"	Matsuyama et al. 2017	Spirochaetota	Brachyspiria	Brachyspirales	Brachyspiraceae	
Brevinema	Defosse et al. 1995 non Stegaresku 1980 non Rubtsov 1978	Spirochaetota	Brevinematia	Brevinematales	Brevinemataceae	
"Longinema"	Karnachuk et al. 2020	Spirochaetota	Brevinematia	Brevinematales	"Longinemataceae"	
Thermospira	Ben Ali Gam et al. 2023	Spirochaetota	Brevinematia	Brevinematales	Thermospiraceae	
Exilispira	Imachi et al. 2008	Spirochaetota	"Exilispiria"	"Exilispirales"	"Exilispiraceae"	
Leptonema	Hovind-Hougen 1983 non Rabenhorst 1857 non Reinke 1888 non Jussieu 1824 non Hooker 1844 non Smith 1896 non Ijima 1927 non Guerin 1844 non Lendenfeld 1915 non Jairajpuri 1964	Spirochaetota	Leptospiria	Leptospirales	Leptonemataceae	
Leptospira	Noguchi 1917 non Swainson 1840 non Boucot, Johnson & Staton 1964	Spirochaetota	Leptospiria	Leptospirales	Leptospiraceae	
Turneriella	Levett et al. 2005 non Seven & Özdikmen 2005	Spirochaetota	Leptospiria	Turneriellales	Turneriellaceae	"Turneria" Hookey, Bryden & Gatehouse 1993 non Glibert & van de Poel 1966 non Forel 1895 non Parent 1934 nom. nud. non Tutt 1903 non Hedqvist 1970 non Chatterjee & Small 1989
Borrelia	Swellengrebel 1907	Spirochaetota	Spirochaetia	"Borreliales"	Borreliaceae	"Cacospira" Enderlein 1917; Spironema Bergy et al. 1923 non Vuillemin 1905 non Klebs 1892 non Léger & Hesse 1922 non Rafinesque 1838 non Hochst. 1842 non Lindley 1840 non Meek 1864; "Spiroschaudinnia" Sambon 1907
Borreliella	Adeolu & Gupta 2015	Spirochaetota	Spirochaetia	"Borreliales"	Borreliaceae	
Cristispira	Gross 1910	Spirochaetota	Spirochaetia	"Borreliales"	Borreliaceae	"Cristispirella" Hollande 1921
Marispirochaeta	Shivani et al. 2017	Spirochaetota	Spirochaetia	"Marispirochaetales"	Marispirochaetaceae	
Alkalispirochaeta	Sravanthi et al. 2016	Spirochaetota	Spirochaetia	"Salinispirales"	Alkalispirochaetaceae	
Salinispira	Ben Hania et al. 2015	Spirochaetota	Spirochaetia	"Salinispirales"	Salinispiraceae	
Sediminispirochaeta	Shivani et al. 2016	Spirochaetota	Spirochaetia	"Sediminispirochaetales"	Sediminispirochaetaceae	
Entomospira	Grana-Miraglia et al. 2024	Spirochaetota	Spirochaetia	"Entomospirales"	"Entomospiraceae"	
Bullifex	Wylensek et al. 2021	Spirochaetota	Spirochaetia	"Sphaerochaetales"	Sphaerochaetaceae	"Ca. Aphodenecus" Gilroy et al. 2021
Neosphaerochaeta	Krasenbrink et al. 2026	Spirochaetota	Spirochaetia	"Sphaerochaetales"	Sphaerochaetaceae	
"Ca. Ornithospirochaeta"	Gilroy et al. 2021	Spirochaetota	Spirochaetia	"Sphaerochaetales"	Sphaerochaetaceae	
Parasphaerochaeta	Bidzhieva et al. 2020	Spirochaetota	Spirochaetia	"Sphaerochaetales"	Sphaerochaetaceae	
"Ca. Physcosoma"	Gilroy et al. 2022	Spirochaetota	Spirochaetia	"Sphaerochaetales"	Sphaerochaetaceae	
Pleomorphochaeta	Arroua et al. 2016	Spirochaetota	Spirochaetia	"Sphaerochaetales"	Sphaerochaetaceae	
Sphaerochaeta	Ritalahti et al. 2012	Spirochaetota	Spirochaetia	"Sphaerochaetales"	Sphaerochaetaceae	
Oceanispirochaeta	Subhash & Lee 2017b	Spirochaetota	Spirochaetia	Spirochaetales_E	"Thiospirochaetaceae"	
Thiospirochaeta	Dubinina et al. 2020	Spirochaetota	Spirochaetia	Spirochaetales_E	"Thiospirochaetaceae"	
Pillotina	Hollande & Gharagozlou 1967 ex Bermudes, Chase & Margulis 1988	Spirochaetota	Spirochaetia	Spirochaetales	"Pillotinaceae"	
"Ca. Allospironema"	corrig. Paster & Dewhirst 2000	Spirochaetota	Spirochaetia	Spirochaetales	Spirochaetaceae	"Ca. Spironema" Paster & Dewhirst 2000
"Canaleparolina"	Wier, Ashen & Margulis 2000	Spirochaetota	Spirochaetia	Spirochaetales	Spirochaetaceae	
Clevelandina	Bermudes, Chase & Margulis 1988	Spirochaetota	Spirochaetia	Spirochaetales	Spirochaetaceae	
Diplocalyx	Gharagozlou 1968 ex Bermudes, Chase & Margulis 1988 non Presl 1845 non Richard 1850	Spirochaetota	Spirochaetia	Spirochaetales	Spirochaetaceae	
"Mobilifilum"	Margulis et al. 1990	Spirochaetota	Spirochaetia	Spirochaetales	Spirochaetaceae	
Spirochaeta	Ehrenberg 1835 non Turczaninow 1851	Spirochaetota	Spirochaetia	Spirochaetales	Spirochaetaceae	"Ehrenbergia" Gieszczykiewiez 1939 non Martius 1827 non Sprengel 1820
"Ca. Haliotispira"	Sharma et al. 2024	Spirochaetota	Spirochaetia	SP-2023	SP-2023	
"Ca. Thalassospirochaeta"	Pragya et al. 2024	Spirochaetota	Spirochaetia	UBA9216	UBA9216	
Rectinema	Koelschbach et al. 2017	Spirochaetota	Spirochaetia	Treponematales	Rectinemataceae	
Breznakiella	Song et al. 2022	Spirochaetota	Spirochaetia	Treponematales	Breznakiellaceae	
Gracilinema	Brune et al. 2022	Spirochaetota	Spirochaetia	Treponematales	Breznakiellaceae	
Helmutkoenigia	Brune et al. 2022	Spirochaetota	Spirochaetia	Treponematales	Breznakiellaceae	
Hollandina	To et al. 1978 ex Bermudes, Chase & Margulis 1988 non Haynes 1956	Spirochaetota	Spirochaetia	Treponematales	Breznakiellaceae	
"Hollandinoides"	Treitli et al. 2026	Spirochaetota	Spirochaetia	Treponematales	Breznakiellaceae	
Leadbettera	Brune et al. 2022	Spirochaetota	Spirochaetia	Treponematales	Breznakiellaceae	
"Propulsinema"	Fu et al. 2025	Spirochaetota	Spirochaetia	Treponematales	Breznakiellaceae	
"Termitinema"	Song et al. 2021	Spirochaetota	Spirochaetia	Treponematales	Breznakiellaceae	
Zuelzera	Brune et al. 2022	Spirochaetota	Spirochaetia	Treponematales	Breznakiellaceae	
"Ca. Avitreponema"	Gilroy et al. 2021	Spirochaetota	Spirochaetia	Treponematales	Treponemataceae	
Brucepastera	Song et al. 2023	Spirochaetota	Spirochaetia	Treponematales	Treponemataceae	
"Ca. Gallitreponema"	Gilroy et al. 2021	Spirochaetota	Spirochaetia	Treponematales	Treponemataceae	
Teretinema	Song et al. 2023	Spirochaetota	Spirochaetia	Treponematales	Treponemataceae	
Treponema	Schaudinn 1905	Spirochaetota	Spirochaetia	Treponematales	Treponemataceae	"Microspironema" Stiles & Pfender 1905; "Spironema" Vuillemin 1905 non Bergy et al. 1923 non Paster and Dewhirst 2000 non Klebs 1892 non Léger & Hesse 1922 non Rafinesque 1838 non Hochst. 1842 non Lindley 1840 non Meek 1864; "Treponemella" San Giorgi 1922
Rarispira	Podosokorskaya et al. 2025	Spirochaetota	Spirochaetia	Winmispirales	Winmispiraceae	
Winmispira	Podosokorskaya et al. 2025	Spirochaetota	Spirochaetia	Winmispirales	Winmispiraceae	
"Ca. Spongiamicus"	Sun et al. 2025	"Spongiamicota"	"Spongiamicia"	"Spongiamicales"	"Spongiamicaceae"	
"Ca. Sumerlaea"	Kadnikov et al. 2018	"Sumerlaeota"	"Sumerlaeia"	"Sumerlaeales"	"Sumerlaeaceae"	
"Pacaella"	Ndongo et al. 2017	Synergistota	Synergistia	Synergistales		
"Ca. Tammella"	Hongoh et al. 2007	Synergistota	Synergistia	Synergistales		
Acetomicrobium	Soutschek et al. 1985	Synergistota	Synergistia	Synergistales	Acetomicrobiaceae	Anaerobaculum Rees et al. 1997
Aminiphilus	Diaz et al. 2007	Synergistota	Synergistia	Synergistales	Aminiphilaceae	
"Aminirhabdus"	corrig. Liu et al. 2021	Synergistota	Synergistia	Synergistales	Aminiphilaceae	"Aminirod" Liu et al. 2021
Aminithiophilus	Pradel et al. 2023	Synergistota	Synergistia	Synergistales	Aminithiophilaceae	
Aminivibrio	Honda et al. 2013	Synergistota	Synergistia	Synergistales	Aminobacteriaceae	
Aminobacterium	Baena et al. 1999	Synergistota	Synergistia	Synergistales	Aminobacteriaceae	
Fretibacterium	Vartoukian et al. 2013	Synergistota	Synergistia	Synergistales	Aminobacteriaceae	
Lactivibrio	Qiu et al. 2014	Synergistota	Synergistia	Synergistales	Aminobacteriaceae	
Dethiosulfovibrio	Magot et al. 1997	Synergistota	Synergistia	Synergistales	Dethiosulfovibrionaceae	
Jonquetella	Jumas-Bilak et al. 2007	Synergistota	Synergistia	Synergistales	Dethiosulfovibrionaceae	
Pyramidobacter	Downes et al. 2009	Synergistota	Synergistia	Synergistales	Dethiosulfovibrionaceae	
Rarimicrobium	Jumas-Bilak et al. 2015	Synergistota	Synergistia	Synergistales	Dethiosulfovibrionaceae	
Aminomonas	Baena et al. 1999	Synergistota	Synergistia	Synergistales	Synergistaceae	
"Ca. Caccocola"	Gilroy et al. 2021	Synergistota	Synergistia	Synergistales	Synergistaceae	
Caenicola	El Houari et al. 2026	Synergistota	Synergistia	Synergistales	Synergistaceae	
Cloacibacillus	Ganesan et al. 2008	Synergistota	Synergistia	Synergistales	Synergistaceae	
"Ca. Equadaptatus"	Gilroy et al. 2022	Synergistota	Synergistia	Synergistales	Synergistaceae	
Synergistes	Allison et al. 1993	Synergistota	Synergistia	Synergistales	Synergistaceae	
Thermanaerovibrio	Baena et al. 1999	Synergistota	Synergistia	Synergistales	Synergistaceae	
Thermosynergistes	Yang et al. 2021	Synergistota	Synergistia	Synergistales	Thermosynergistaceae	
Thermovirga	Dahle & Birkeland 2006	Synergistota	Synergistia	Synergistales	Thermovirgaceae	
"Ca. Tangaroaea"	Sun et al. 2025	"Tangaroaeota"	"Tangaroaeia"	"Tangaroaeales"	"Tangaroaeaceae"	
"Ca. Fervidifonticultor"	Liu et al. 2024	"Sysuimicrobiota"	"Sysuimicrobiia"	"Sysuimicrobiales"	"Humicultoraceae"	
"Ca. Geohabitans"	Liu et al. 2024	"Sysuimicrobiota"	"Sysuimicrobiia"	"Sysuimicrobiales"	"Humicultoraceae"	
"Ca. Humicultor"	Liu et al. 2024	"Sysuimicrobiota"	"Sysuimicrobiia"	"Sysuimicrobiales"	"Humicultoraceae"	
"Ca. Calidihabitans"	Liu et al. 2024	"Sysuimicrobiota"	"Sysuimicrobiia"	"Sysuimicrobiales"	"Kaftiobacteriaceae"	
"Ca. Kaftiobacterium"	Liu et al. 2024	"Sysuimicrobiota"	"Sysuimicrobiia"	"Sysuimicrobiales"	"Kaftiobacteriaceae"	
"Ca. Telluricultor"	Liu et al. 2024	"Sysuimicrobiota"	"Sysuimicrobiia"	"Sysuimicrobiales"	"Kaftiobacteriaceae"	
"Ca. Segetimicrobium"	Liu et al. 2024	"Sysuimicrobiota"	"Sysuimicrobiia"	"Sysuimicrobiales"	"Segetimicrobiaceae"	
"Ca. Caldifonticola"	Liu et al. 2024	"Sysuimicrobiota"	"Sysuimicrobiia"	"Sysuimicrobiales"	"Sysuimicrobiaceae"	
"Ca. Sysuimicrobium"	Liu et al. 2024	"Sysuimicrobiota"	"Sysuimicrobiia"	"Sysuimicrobiales"	"Sysuimicrobiaceae"	
"Ca. Tepidifontimicrobium"	Liu et al. 2024	"Sysuimicrobiota"	"Sysuimicrobiia"	"Sysuimicrobiales"	"Sysuimicrobiaceae"	
"Ca. Thermofontivivens"	Liu et al. 2024	"Sysuimicrobiota"	"Sysuimicrobiia"	"Sysuimicrobiales"	"Thermofontiviventaceae"	
"Algidimarina"	Kendall et al. 2005a	Thermodesulfobacteriota				
"Desulfocaldus"	Thevenieau et al. 2004	Thermodesulfobacteriota				
"Desulfostipes"	Myhr, Thorbjornsen & Torsvik 2000	Thermodesulfobacteriota				
"Ca. Anaeroferrophillus"	Murphy et al. 2021	Thermodesulfobacteriota	"Anaeroferrophilia"	"Anaeroferrophilales"	"Anaeroferrophilaceae"	
"Ca. Tharpella"	Speth et al. 2022	Thermodesulfobacteriota	"Anaeroferrophilia"	"Anaeroferrophilales"	"Tharpellaceae"	
"Ca. Binatus"	Chuvochina et al. 2019	Thermodesulfobacteriota	"Binatia"	"Binatales"	"Binataceae"	
"Ca. Deferrimicrobium"	Begmatov et al. 2022	Thermodesulfobacteriota	"Deferrimicrobiia"	"Deferrimicrobiales"	"Deferrimicrobiaceae"	
Deferrisoma	Slobodkina et al. 2012	Thermodesulfobacteriota	Deferrisomatia	Deferrisomatales	Deferrisomataceae	
"Ca. Adiutrix"	Ikeda-Ohtsubo et al. 2016	Thermodesulfobacteriota	Desulfarculia	"Adiutricales"	"Adiutricaceae"	
Desulfarculus	Kuever, Rainey & Widdel 2006	Thermodesulfobacteriota	Desulfarculia	Desulfarculales	Desulfarculaceae	
Desulfocarbo	An & Picardal 2014	Thermodesulfobacteriota	Desulfarculia	Desulfarculales	Desulfarculaceae	
Desulfoferula	Watanabe et al. 2024	Thermodesulfobacteriota	Desulfarculia	Desulfarculales	Desulfarculaceae	
Dethiosulfatarculus	Davidova et al. 2016	Thermodesulfobacteriota	Desulfarculia	Desulfarculales	Desulfarculaceae	
"Desulfacyla"	Van Vliet et al. 2020	Thermodesulfobacteriota	"Desulfatiglandia"	Desulfatiglandales	Desulfatiglandaceae	
Desulfatiglans	Suzuki et al. 2014	Thermodesulfobacteriota	"Desulfatiglandia"	Desulfatiglandales	Desulfatiglandaceae	
Desulfobacca	Oude Elferink et al. 1999	Thermodesulfobacteriota	Desulfobaccia	Desulfobaccales	Desulfobaccaceae	
Desulfobotulus	Kuever, Rainey & Widdel 2009	Thermodesulfobacteriota	Desulfobacteria	Desulfobacterales	ASO4-4	
"Ca. Desulfarcum"	Monteil et al. 2019	Thermodesulfobacteriota	Desulfobacteria	Desulfobacterales	CR-1	
"Desulfaltia"	Van Vliet et al. 2020	Thermodesulfobacteriota	Desulfobacteria	Desulfobacterales	"Desulfaltiaceae"	
Desulfatibacillum	Cravo-Laureau et al. 2004	Thermodesulfobacteriota	Desulfobacteria	Desulfobacterales	Desulfatibacillaceae	
"Desulfatibia"	Van Vliet et al. 2020	Thermodesulfobacteriota	Desulfobacteria	Desulfobacterales	"Desulfatibiaceae"	
Desulfatirhabdium	Balk et al. 2008	Thermodesulfobacteriota	Desulfobacteria	Desulfobacterales	Desulfatirhabdiaceae	
"Algorimarina"	Kendall, Liu & Boone 2006	Thermodesulfobacteriota	Desulfobacteria	Desulfobacterales	Desulfobacteraceae	
"Desulfamplus"	Descamps et al. 2017	Thermodesulfobacteriota	Desulfobacteria	Desulfobacterales	Desulfobacteraceae	
Desulfobacter	Widdel 1981	Thermodesulfobacteriota	Desulfobacteria	Desulfobacterales	Desulfobacteraceae	
Desulfobacula	Rabus et al. 2000	Thermodesulfobacteriota	Desulfobacteria	Desulfobacterales	Desulfobacteraceae	
Desulfocella	Brandt, Patel & Ingvorsen 1999	Thermodesulfobacteriota	Desulfobacteria	Desulfobacterales	Desulfobacteraceae	
Desulfocicer	Galushko & Kuever 2021	Thermodesulfobacteriota	Desulfobacteria	Desulfobacterales	Desulfobacteraceae	
Desulfoconvexum	Konneke et al. 2013	Thermodesulfobacteriota	Desulfobacteria	Desulfobacterales	Desulfobacteraceae	
Desulforapulum	Galushko & Kuever 2021	Thermodesulfobacteriota	Desulfobacteria	Desulfobacterales	Desulfobacteraceae	
Desulfospira	Finster, Liesack & Tindall 1997	Thermodesulfobacteriota	Desulfobacteria	Desulfobacterales	Desulfobacteraceae	
Desulfotignum	Kuever et al. 2001	Thermodesulfobacteriota	Desulfobacteria	Desulfobacterales	Desulfobacteraceae	
Desulfobacterium	Bak & Widdel 1988	Thermodesulfobacteriota	Desulfobacteria	Desulfobacterales	Desulfobacteriaceae	
Desulfosediminibacter	Dyksma et al. 2026	Thermodesulfobacteriota	Desulfobacteria	Desulfobacterales	Desulfobacteriaceae	
Desulfococcus	Widdel 1981	Thermodesulfobacteriota	Desulfobacteria	Desulfobacterales	Desulfococcaceae	
Desulfonema	Widdel 1981	Thermodesulfobacteriota	Desulfobacteria	Desulfobacterales	Desulfococcaceae	
Desulfofaba	Knoblauch, Sahm & Jorgensen 1999	Thermodesulfobacteriota	Desulfobacteria	Desulfobacterales	Desulfofabaceae	"Desulfoliva" Galushko & Kuever 2020; Desulfomusa Finster, Thomsen & Ramsing 2001
Desulfatiferula	Cravo-Laureau et al. 2007	Thermodesulfobacteriota	Desulfobacteria	Desulfobacterales	Desulfolunaceae	
Desulfofrigus	Knoblauch, Sahm & Jorgensen 1999	Thermodesulfobacteriota	Desulfobacteria	Desulfobacterales	Desulfolunaceae	
Desulfoluna	Suzuki et al. 2008	Thermodesulfobacteriota	Desulfobacteria	Desulfobacterales	Desulfolunaceae	
Desulforegula	Rees & Patel 2001	Thermodesulfobacteriota	Desulfobacteria	Desulfobacterales	Desulforegulaceae	
Desulfatitalea	Higashioka et al. 2013	Thermodesulfobacteriota	Desulfobacteria	Desulfobacterales	Desulfosarcinaceae	
Desulfosarcina	Widdel 1981	Thermodesulfobacteriota	Desulfobacteria	Desulfobacterales	Desulfosarcinaceae	
Desulfonatronobacter	Sorokin et al. 2012	Thermodesulfobacteriota	Desulfobacteria	Desulfobacterales	Desulfosalsimonadaceae	
Desulfosalsimonas	Kjeldsen et al. 2010	Thermodesulfobacteriota	Desulfobacteria	Desulfobacterales	Desulfosalsimonadaceae	
Desulfosudis	Galushko & Kuever 2021	Thermodesulfobacteriota	Desulfobacteria	Desulfobacterales	Desulfosudaceae	
"Ca. Magnetananas"	Zhou et al. 2012	Thermodesulfobacteriota	Desulfobacteria	Desulfobacterales	"Magnetomoraceae"	
"Magnetogigantoglobus"	Turrini et al. 2025	Thermodesulfobacteriota	Desulfobacteria	Desulfobacterales	"Magnetomoraceae"	
"Ca. Magnetoglobus"	Abreu et al. 2007	Thermodesulfobacteriota	Desulfobacteria	Desulfobacterales	"Magnetomoraceae"	
"Ca. Magnetomorum"	Wenter et al. 2009	Thermodesulfobacteriota	Desulfobacteria	Desulfobacterales	"Magnetomoraceae"	
"Ca. Desulfobia"	Van Vliet et al. 2020	Thermodesulfobacteriota	Desulfobulbia	Desulfobulbales	SURF-16	
Desulfobulbus	Widdel 1981	Thermodesulfobacteriota	Desulfobulbia	Desulfobulbales	Desulfobulbaceae	
Desulfogranum	Galushko & Kuever 2021	Thermodesulfobacteriota	Desulfobulbia	Desulfobulbales	Desulfobulbaceae	
Desulfolithobacter	Hashimoto et al. 2023	Thermodesulfobacteriota	Desulfobulbia	Desulfobulbales	Desulfobulbaceae	
"Ca. Electronema"	Trojan et al. 2016	Thermodesulfobacteriota	Desulfobulbia	Desulfobulbales	Desulfobulbaceae	
"Ca. Electrothrix"	Trojan et al. 2016	Thermodesulfobacteriota	Desulfobulbia	Desulfobulbales	Desulfobulbaceae	
Hydrosulfovibrio	Zhang et al. 2026	Thermodesulfobacteriota	Desulfobulbia	Desulfobulbales	Desulfobulbaceae	
"Ca. Desulfatifera"	Van Vliet et al. 2020	Thermodesulfobacteriota	Desulfobulbia	Desulfobulbales	Desulfocapsaceae	
Desulfocapsa	Janssen et al. 1997	Thermodesulfobacteriota	Desulfobulbia	Desulfobulbales	Desulfocapsaceae	
Desulfocastanea	Galushko & Kuever 2021	Thermodesulfobacteriota	Desulfobulbia	Desulfobulbales	Desulfocapsaceae	
Desulfofustis	Friedrich et al. 1996	Thermodesulfobacteriota	Desulfobulbia	Desulfobulbales	Desulfocapsaceae	
Desulfomarina	Hashimoto et al. 2021	Thermodesulfobacteriota	Desulfobulbia	Desulfobulbales	Desulfocapsaceae	
Desulfopila	Suzuki et al. 2007	Thermodesulfobacteriota	Desulfobulbia	Desulfobulbales	Desulfocapsaceae	Desulfosediminicola Song et al. 2021
Desulfoprunum	Junghare & Schink 2015	Thermodesulfobacteriota	Desulfobulbia	Desulfobulbales	Desulfocapsaceae	
Desulforhopalus	Isaksen & Teske 1999	Thermodesulfobacteriota	Desulfobulbia	Desulfobulbales	Desulfocapsaceae	
Desulfotalea	Knoblauch, Sahm & Jorgensen 1999	Thermodesulfobacteriota	Desulfobulbia	Desulfobulbales	Desulfocapsaceae	
Desulfurivibrio	Sorokin et al. 2008	Thermodesulfobacteriota	Desulfobulbia	Desulfobulbales	Desulfurivibrionaceae	
Thiovibrio	Aronson et al. 2023	Thermodesulfobacteriota	Desulfobulbia	Desulfobulbales	Desulfurivibrionaceae	
"Ca. Desulfocorpusculum"	Slobodkina et al. 2025	Thermodesulfobacteriota	"Desulfocorpusculales"	"Desulfocorpusculales"	"Desulfocorpusculaceae"	
"Ca. Desulfofervidus"	Krukenberg et al. 2016	Thermodesulfobacteriota	"Desulfofervidia"	"Desulfofervidales"	"Desulfofervidaceae"	
Desulfomonile	DeWeerd et al. 1991	Thermodesulfobacteriota	Desulfomonilia	Desulfomonilales	Desulfomonilaceae	
"Ca. Phosphitivorax"	Figueroa et al. 2018	Thermodesulfobacteriota	Desulfomonilia	UBA1062	UBA1062	
Desulfohalobium	Ollivier et al. 1991	Thermodesulfobacteriota	Desulfovibrionia	Desulfovibrionales	Desulfohalobiaceae	
"Desulfohalophilus"	Blum et al. 2012	Thermodesulfobacteriota	Desulfovibrionia	Desulfovibrionales	Desulfothermaceae	
Desulfothermus	Kuever, Rainey & Widdel 2006	Thermodesulfobacteriota	Desulfovibrionia	Desulfovibrionales	Desulfothermaceae	
Desulfovermiculus	Belyakova et al. 2007	Thermodesulfobacteriota	Desulfovibrionia	Desulfovibrionales	Desulfothermaceae	
Desulfomicrobium	Rozanova et al. 1994	Thermodesulfobacteriota	Desulfovibrionia	Desulfovibrionales	Desulfomicrobiaceae	
Desulfoplanes	Watanabe et al. 2015	Thermodesulfobacteriota	Desulfovibrionia	Desulfovibrionales	Desulfomicrobiaceae	
Thermodesulfomicrobium	Galushko & Kuever 2021	Thermodesulfobacteriota	Desulfovibrionia	Desulfovibrionales	Desulfomicrobiaceae	
Desulfonatronum	Pikuta et al. 1998	Thermodesulfobacteriota	Desulfovibrionia	Desulfovibrionales	Desulfonatronaceae	
Desulfonauticus	Audiffrin et al. 2003	Thermodesulfobacteriota	Desulfovibrionia	Desulfovibrionales	Desulfonauticaceae	
Desulfovulcanus	Kashyap et al. 2023	Thermodesulfobacteriota	Desulfovibrionia	Desulfovibrionales	Desulfonauticaceae	
Desulfonatronospira	Sorokin et al. 2008	Thermodesulfobacteriota	Desulfovibrionia	Desulfovibrionales	Desulfonatronovibrionaceae	
Desulfonatronovibrio	Zhilina et al. 1997	Thermodesulfobacteriota	Desulfovibrionia	Desulfovibrionales	Desulfonatronovibrionaceae	
Alkalidesulfovibrio	Park et al. 2022	Thermodesulfobacteriota	Desulfovibrionia	Desulfovibrionales	Desulfovibrionaceae	
"Alteridesulfovibrio"	Waite et al. 2020	Thermodesulfobacteriota	Desulfovibrionia	Desulfovibrionales	Desulfovibrionaceae	
"Aminidesulfovibrio"	Galushko & Kuever 2019	Thermodesulfobacteriota	Desulfovibrionia	Desulfovibrionales	Desulfovibrionaceae	
"Ca. Avidesulfovibrio"	Gilroy et al. 2021	Thermodesulfobacteriota	Desulfovibrionia	Desulfovibrionales	Desulfovibrionaceae	
Bilophila	Baron et al. 1990	Thermodesulfobacteriota	Desulfovibrionia	Desulfovibrionales	Desulfovibrionaceae	Lawsonia McOrist et al. 1995 non Sharp 1873 non von Linné 1753
Cupidesulfovibrio	Wan et al. 2021	Thermodesulfobacteriota	Desulfovibrionia	Desulfovibrionales	Desulfovibrionaceae	
Desulfobaculum	corrig. Zhao et al. 2012	Thermodesulfobacteriota	Desulfovibrionia	Desulfovibrionales	Desulfovibrionaceae	Paradesulfovibrio Waite et al. 2020
Desulfocurvibacter	Spring et al. 2019	Thermodesulfobacteriota	Desulfovibrionia	Desulfovibrionales	Desulfovibrionaceae	
Desulfocurvus	Klouche et al. 2009	Thermodesulfobacteriota	Desulfovibrionia	Desulfovibrionales	Desulfovibrionaceae	
Desulfohalovibrio	Spring et al. 2019	Thermodesulfobacteriota	Desulfovibrionia	Desulfovibrionales	Desulfovibrionaceae	Park et al. 2022
Desulfolutivibrio	Thiel et al. 2021	Thermodesulfobacteriota	Desulfovibrionia	Desulfovibrionales	Desulfovibrionaceae	
Desulfovibrio	Kluyver & van Niel 1936	Thermodesulfobacteriota	Desulfovibrionia	Desulfovibrionales	Desulfovibrionaceae	Desulfomonas Moore, Johnson & Holdeman 1976; "Desulphoristella" Hvid-Hansen 1951; "Sporovibrio" Starkey 1938
"Endodesulfobacter"	corrig. Bolzoni et al. 2026	Thermodesulfobacteriota	Desulfovibrionia	Desulfovibrionales	Desulfovibrionaceae	
"Frigididesulfovibrio"	Waite et al. 2020	Thermodesulfobacteriota	Desulfovibrionia	Desulfovibrionales	Desulfovibrionaceae	
Fundidesulfovibrio	Waite et al. 2020	Thermodesulfobacteriota	Desulfovibrionia	Desulfovibrionales	Desulfovibrionaceae	
Halodesulfovibrio	Shivani et al. 2017	Thermodesulfobacteriota	Desulfovibrionia	Desulfovibrionales	Desulfovibrionaceae	"Psychrodesulfovibrio" Galushko & Kuever 2020
Humidesulfovibrio	Waite et al. 2020	Thermodesulfobacteriota	Desulfovibrionia	Desulfovibrionales	Desulfovibrionaceae	
"Mailhella"	Ndongo et al. 2017	Thermodesulfobacteriota	Desulfovibrionia	Desulfovibrionales	Desulfovibrionaceae	
Maridesulfovibrio	Waite et al. 2020	Thermodesulfobacteriota	Desulfovibrionia	Desulfovibrionales	Desulfovibrionaceae	
Megalodesulfovibrio	Waite et al. 2021	Thermodesulfobacteriota	Desulfovibrionia	Desulfovibrionales	Desulfovibrionaceae	
Nitratidesulfovibrio	Waite et al. 2020	Thermodesulfobacteriota	Desulfovibrionia	Desulfovibrionales	Desulfovibrionaceae	
Oceanidesulfovibrio	Galushko & Kuever 2021	Thermodesulfobacteriota	Desulfovibrionia	Desulfovibrionales	Desulfovibrionaceae	
Oleidesulfovibrio	Waite et al. 2020	Thermodesulfobacteriota	Desulfovibrionia	Desulfovibrionales	Desulfovibrionaceae	
Paucidesulfovibrio	Waite et al. 2020	Thermodesulfobacteriota	Desulfovibrionia	Desulfovibrionales	Desulfovibrionaceae	
Pseudodesulfovibrio	Cao et al. 2016	Thermodesulfobacteriota	Desulfovibrionia	Desulfovibrionales	Desulfovibrionaceae	"Salidesulfovibrio" Park et al. 2022
Solidesulfovibrio	Waite et al. 2020	Thermodesulfobacteriota	Desulfovibrionia	Desulfovibrionales	Desulfovibrionaceae	
"Ca Stromatodesulfovibrio"	Nobs et al. 2026	Thermodesulfobacteriota	Desulfovibrionia	Desulfovibrionales	Desulfovibrionaceae	
"Taurinivorans"	Ye et al. 2023	Thermodesulfobacteriota	Desulfovibrionia	Desulfovibrionales	Desulfovibrionaceae	
"Thalassodesulfovibrio"	Aguilera-Campos et al. 2025	Thermodesulfobacteriota	Desulfovibrionia	Desulfovibrionales	Desulfovibrionaceae	
"Deferrimonas"	Waite et al. 2020	Thermodesulfobacteriota	Desulfuromonadia	Desulfuromonadales	WTL	
Desulfuromonas	Pfennig & Biebl 1977	Thermodesulfobacteriota	Desulfuromonadia	Desulfuromonadales	Desulfuromonadaceae	
"Pseudodesulfuromonas"	Waite et al. 2020	Thermodesulfobacteriota	Desulfuromonadia	Desulfuromonadales	Desulfuromonadaceae	
Geoalkalibacter	Zavarzina et al. 2007	Thermodesulfobacteriota	Desulfuromonadia	Desulfuromonadales	Geoalkalibacteraceae	
Desulfuromusa	Liesack & Finster 1994	Thermodesulfobacteriota	Desulfuromonadia	Desulfuromonadales	Geopsychrobacteraceae	
Geopsychrobacter	Holmes et al. 2005	Thermodesulfobacteriota	Desulfuromonadia	Desulfuromonadales	Geopsychrobacteraceae	
Malonomonas	Dehning & Schink 1990	Thermodesulfobacteriota	Desulfuromonadia	Desulfuromonadales	Geopsychrobacteraceae	
Pelobacter	Schink & Pfennig 1983	Thermodesulfobacteriota	Desulfuromonadia	Desulfuromonadales	Geopsychrobacteraceae	
Pelovirga	Khomyakova et al. 2022	Thermodesulfobacteriota	Desulfuromonadia	Desulfuromonadales	Geopsychrobacteraceae	
Seleniibacterium	Waite et al. 2020	Thermodesulfobacteriota	Desulfuromonadia	Desulfuromonadales	Geopsychrobacteraceae	
Geothermobacter	Kashefi et al. 2005	Thermodesulfobacteriota	Desulfuromonadia	Desulfuromonadales	Geothermobacteraceae	
Syntrophotalea	Waite et al. 2020	Thermodesulfobacteriota	Desulfuromonadia	Desulfuromonadales	Syntrophotaleaceae	
Trichloromonas	Waite et al. 2025	Thermodesulfobacteriota	Desulfuromonadia	Desulfuromonadales	Trichloromonadaceae	
Geoanaerobacter	Xu et al. 2022	Thermodesulfobacteriota	Desulfuromonadia	Geobacterales	DSM12255	
"Geomobilibacter"	Xu et al. 2021	Thermodesulfobacteriota	Desulfuromonadia	Geobacterales	DSM12255	
Geobacter	Lovley et al. 1995	Thermodesulfobacteriota	Desulfuromonadia	Geobacterales	Geobacteraceae	
Geomesophilobacter	Zhang et al. 2021	Thermodesulfobacteriota	Desulfuromonadia	Geobacterales	Geobacteraceae	
Geomobilimonas	Xu et al. 2022	Thermodesulfobacteriota	Desulfuromonadia	Geobacterales	Geobacteraceae	
Geomonas	Xu et al. 2020	Thermodesulfobacteriota	Desulfuromonadia	Geobacterales	Geobacteraceae	Citrifermentans Waite et al. 2020
Geotalea	Waite et al. 2020	Thermodesulfobacteriota	Desulfuromonadia	Geobacterales	Geobacteraceae	
"Irobacter"	Anestis et al. 2026	Thermodesulfobacteriota	Desulfuromonadia	Geobacterales	"Pseudopelobacteraceae"	
"Ca. Geosyntrophus"	Jovicic et al. 2026	Thermodesulfobacteriota	Desulfuromonadia	Geobacterales	"Pseudopelobacteraceae"	"Ca. Dufopella" Pallen et al. 2022
Oryzomonas	Xu et al. 2020	Thermodesulfobacteriota	Desulfuromonadia	Geobacterales	"Pseudopelobacteraceae"	
Pelotalea	Xu et al. 2022	Thermodesulfobacteriota	Desulfuromonadia	Geobacterales	"Pseudopelobacteraceae"	
"Pseudopelobacter"	Waite et al. 2020	Thermodesulfobacteriota	Desulfuromonadia	Geobacterales	"Pseudopelobacteraceae"	
Trichlorobacter	De Wever et al. 2001	Thermodesulfobacteriota	Desulfuromonadia	Geobacterales	"Pseudopelobacteraceae"	
Dissulfurimicrobium	Slobodkin et al. 2016	Thermodesulfobacteriota	Dissulfuribacteria	Dissulfuribacterales	Sh68	
Dissulfuribacter	Slobodkin et al. 2013	Thermodesulfobacteriota	Dissulfuribacteria	Dissulfuribacterales	Dissulfuribacteraceae	
Dissulfurirhabdus	Slobodkina et al. 2016	Thermodesulfobacteriota	Dissulfuribacteria	Dissulfuribacterales	"Dissulfurirhabdaceae"	
Smithella	Liu et al. 1999	Thermodesulfobacteriota	Syntrophia	Syntrophales	Smithellaceae	
Syntrophus	Mountfort et al. 1984	Thermodesulfobacteriota	Syntrophia	Syntrophales	Syntrophaceae	
Desulfacinum	Rees et al. 1995	Thermodesulfobacteriota	Syntrophobacteria	Syntrophobacterales	"Desulfosomataceae"	
Desulfatimicrobium	Azabou et al. 2005	Thermodesulfobacteriota	Syntrophobacteria	Syntrophobacterales	"Desulfosomataceae"	
Desulfoglaeba	Davidova et al. 2006	Thermodesulfobacteriota	Syntrophobacteria	Syntrophobacterales	"Desulfosomataceae"	
"Ca. Desulfonatronobulbus"	Sorokin & Chernyh 2016	Thermodesulfobacteriota	Syntrophobacteria	Syntrophobacterales	"Desulfosomataceae"	
Desulfosoma	Baena et al. 2011	Thermodesulfobacteriota	Syntrophobacteria	Syntrophobacterales	"Desulfosomataceae"	
Desulfoferrobacter	Davidova et al. 2022	Thermodesulfobacteriota	Syntrophobacteria	Syntrophobacterales	Syntrophobacteraceae	
Desulforhabdus	Oude Elferink et al. 1997	Thermodesulfobacteriota	Syntrophobacteria	Syntrophobacterales	Syntrophobacteraceae	
Desulfovirga	Tanaka et al. 2000	Thermodesulfobacteriota	Syntrophobacteria	Syntrophobacterales	Syntrophobacteraceae	
Syntrophobacter	Boone & Bryant 1984	Thermodesulfobacteriota	Syntrophobacteria	Syntrophobacterales	Syntrophobacteraceae	Syntrophobacterium Galushko & Kuever 2021
Syntrophorhabdus	Qiu et al. 2008	Thermodesulfobacteriota	Syntrophorhabdia	Syntrophorhabdales	Syntrophorhabdaceae	
Thermodesulforhabdus	Beeder et al. 1996	Thermodesulfobacteriota	Syntrophobacteria	Syntrophobacterales	Thermodesulforhabdaceae	
"Geothermobacterium"	Kashefi et al. 2002	Thermodesulfobacteriota	Thermodesulfobacteriia	Thermodesulfobacteriales		
Thermosulfuriphilus	Slobodkina et al. 2017	Thermodesulfobacteriota	Thermodesulfobacteriia	Thermodesulfobacteriales	"Thermosulfuriphilaceae"	
Thermodesulfatator	Moussard et al. 2004	Thermodesulfobacteriota	Thermodesulfobacteriia	Thermodesulfobacteriales	Thermodesulfatatoraceae	
Caldimicrobium	Miroshnichenko et al. 2009	Thermodesulfobacteriota	Thermodesulfobacteriia	Thermodesulfobacteriales	Thermodesulfobacteriaceae	
Thermodesulfobacterium	Zeikus et al. 1995	Thermodesulfobacteriota	Thermodesulfobacteriia	Thermodesulfobacteriales	Thermodesulfobacteriaceae	
Thermosulfurimonas	Slobodkin et al. 2012	Thermodesulfobacteriota	Thermodesulfobacteriia	Thermodesulfobacteriales	Thermodesulfobacteriaceae	
"Ca. Zymogenus"	Murphy et al. 2021	Thermodesulfobacteriota	"Zymogeniia"	"Zymogeniales"	"Zymogeniaceae"	
Thermodesulfobium	Morie et al. 2004	Thermodesulfobiota	Thermodesulfobiia	Thermodesulfobiales	Thermodesulfobiaceae	
Thermosulfidibacter	Nunoura et al. 2008	Thermosulfidibacterota	Thermosulfidibacteria	Thermosulfidibacterales	Thermosulfidibacteraceae	
"Caldotoga"	Xue et al. 1999	Thermotogota	"Thermotogia"			
Athalassotoga	Itoh et al. 2016	Thermotogota	"Thermotogia"	Mesoaciditogales	Mesoaciditogaceae	
Mesoaciditoga	Reysenbach et al. 2013	Thermotogota	"Thermotogia"	Mesoaciditogales	Mesoaciditogaceae	
Kosmotoga	DiPippo et al. 2009	Thermotogota	"Thermotogia"	Petrotogales	Kosmotogaceae	Thermococcoides Feng et al. 2010
Mesotoga	Nesbo et al. 2012	Thermotogota	"Thermotogia"	Petrotogales	Kosmotogaceae	
Defluviitoga	Ben Hania et al. 2012	Thermotogota	"Thermotogia"	Petrotogales	Petrotogaceae	
Geotoga	Davey et al. 1993	Thermotogota	"Thermotogia"	Petrotogales	Petrotogaceae	
Marinitoga	Wery et al. 2001	Thermotogota	"Thermotogia"	Petrotogales	Petrotogaceae	
Oceanotoga	Jayasinghearachchi & Lal 2011	Thermotogota	"Thermotogia"	Petrotogales	Petrotogaceae	
Petrotoga	Davey et al. 1993	Thermotogota	"Thermotogia"	Petrotogales	Petrotogaceae	
Tepiditoga	Mori et al. 2021	Thermotogota	"Thermotogia"	Petrotogales	Petrotogaceae	
Fervidobacterium	Patel, Morgan & Daniel 1985	Thermotogota	"Thermotogia"	Thermotogales	Fervidobacteriaceae	
Thermosipho	Huber et al. 1989 non Kantor et al. 2013	Thermotogota	"Thermotogia"	Thermotogales	Fervidobacteriaceae	
Pseudothermotoga	Bhandari & Gupta 2014	Thermotogota	"Thermotogia"	Thermotogales	"Pseudothermotogaceae"	
"Thermopallium"	Duckworth et al. 1996	Thermotogota	"Thermotogia"	Thermotogales	Thermotogaceae	
Thermotoga	Huber et al. 1986	Thermotogota	"Thermotogia"	Thermotogales	Thermotogaceae	
"Ca. Tianyaibacterium"	corrig. Cui et al. 2021	"Tianyaibacteriota"				
"Ca. Epixenosoma"	Bauer Aet al. 2005	Verrucomicrobiota				
"Ca. Nucleicoccus"	corrig. Sato et al. 2014	Verrucomicrobiota				
"Ca. Organicella"	Williams et al. 2021	Verrucomicrobiota				
"Ca. Rhizospheria"	Nunes da Rocha 2010	Verrucomicrobiota				
Kiritimatiella	Spring et al. 2017	Verrucomicrobiota	"Kiritimatiellia"	Kiritimatiellales	Kiritimatiellaceae	
Pontiella	Vliet et al. 2020	Verrucomicrobiota	"Kiritimatiellia"	Kiritimatiellales	Pontiellaceae	
Tichowtungia	Mu et al. 2020	Verrucomicrobiota	"Kiritimatiellia"	Kiritimatiellales	Tichowtungiaceae	
"Ca. Colisoma"	Gilroy et al. 2022	Verrucomicrobiota	"Kiritimatiellia"	"Spyradenecales"	"Spyradenecaceae"	
"Ca. Spyradenecus"	Gilroy et al. 2021	Verrucomicrobiota	"Kiritimatiellia"	"Spyradenecales"	"Spyradenecaceae"	
"Ca. Coldseepella"	corrig. Zhang et al. 2022	Verrucomicrobiota	Lentisphaeria		"Anaerobicaceae"	
Lentisphaera	Cho et al. 2004	Verrucomicrobiota	Lentisphaeria	Lentisphaerales	Lentisphaeraceae	
Oligosphaera	Qiu et al. 2013	Verrucomicrobiota	Lentisphaeria	Oligosphaerales	Oligosphaeraceae	
Victivallis	Zoetendal et al. 2003	Verrucomicrobiota	Lentisphaeria	Victivallales	Victivallaceae	
Fontisphaera	Podosokorskaya et al. 2023	Verrucomicrobiota	Verrucomicrobiia	Limisphaerales	Fontisphaeraceae	
Limisphaera	Anders et al. 2015	Verrucomicrobiota	Verrucomicrobiia	Limisphaerales	Limisphaeraceae	
"Pedosphaera"	Ozyurt et al. 2008	Verrucomicrobiota	Verrucomicrobiia	Limisphaerales	"Pedosphaeraceae"	
"Methylacidimicrobium"	van Teeseling et al. 2014	Verrucomicrobiota	Verrucomicrobiia	"Methylacidiphilales"	"Methylacidiphilaceae"	
Methylacidiphilum	Ratnadevi et al. 2023	Verrucomicrobiota	Verrucomicrobiia	"Methylacidiphilales"	"Methylacidiphilaceae"	"Acidimethylosilex" Pol et al. 2007; "Methyloacida" Islam et al. 2008; "Methylokorus" Dunfiled et al. 2007
"Ca. Methylacidithermus"	Picone et al. 2021	Verrucomicrobiota	Verrucomicrobiia	"Methylacidiphilales"	"Methylacidiphilaceae"	
"Verrucolacustris"	Salcher et al. 2025	Verrucomicrobiota	Verrucomicrobiia	"Methylacidiphilales"	"Verrucolacustridaceae"	
Cerasicoccus	Yoon et al. 2007	Verrucomicrobiota	Verrucomicrobiia	Opitutales	Cerasicoccaceae	
Rubellicoccus	Luo et al. 2024	Verrucomicrobiota	Verrucomicrobiia	Opitutales	Cerasicoccaceae	
Ruficoccus	Lin et al. 2017	Verrucomicrobiota	Verrucomicrobiia	Opitutales	Cerasicoccaceae	
Coraliomargarita	Yoon et al. 2007	Verrucomicrobiota	Verrucomicrobiia	Opitutales	Coraliomargaritaceae	
"Lentimonas"	Choo & Cho 2006	Verrucomicrobiota	Verrucomicrobiia	Opitutales	Coraliomargaritaceae	
"Thalassobacterium"	Tan et al. 2025	Verrucomicrobiota	Verrucomicrobiia	Opitutales	Coraliomargaritaceae	
Intestinicryptomonas		Verrucomicrobiota	Verrucomicrobiia	Opitutales	"Intestinicryptomonadaceae"	
"Ca. Merdousia"	Gilroy et al. 2021	Verrucomicrobiota	Verrucomicrobiia	Opitutales	"Merdousiaceae"	
"Ca. Moanibacter"	corrig. Vosseberg, Martijn & Ettema 2018	Verrucomicrobiota	Verrucomicrobiia	Opitutales	"Moanibacteraceae"	
Oceanipulchritudo	Feng et al. 2020	Verrucomicrobiota	Verrucomicrobiia	Opitutales	Oceanipulchritudinaceae	
Actomonas	Zhang et al. 2024	Verrucomicrobiota	Verrucomicrobiia	Opitutales	Opitutaceae	"Candidatus Synoicihabitans" Murray et al. 2021; "Synoicihabitans" Ahmad et al. 2024
Alterococcus	Shieh & Jean 1999	Verrucomicrobiota	Verrucomicrobiia	Opitutales	Opitutaceae	
Cephaloticoccus	Lin et al. 2016	Verrucomicrobiota	Verrucomicrobiia	Opitutales	Opitutaceae	
"Congregicoccus"	Islam et al. 2025	Verrucomicrobiota	Verrucomicrobiia	Opitutales	Opitutaceae	
"Ca. Didemniditutus"	corrig. Lopera et al. 2017	Verrucomicrobiota	Verrucomicrobiia	Opitutales	Opitutaceae	
Ereboglobus	Tegtmeier et al. 2018	Verrucomicrobiota	Verrucomicrobiia	Opitutales	Opitutaceae	
Geminisphaera	Wertz et al. 2018	Verrucomicrobiota	Verrucomicrobiia	Opitutales	Opitutaceae	"Didymococcus" Wertz et al. 2017 non Blume 1849; "Diplosphaera" Wertz et al. 2012 non Bialosuknia 1909 non Haeckel 1860 non Derville 1931
Horticoccus	Chung et al. 2023	Verrucomicrobiota	Verrucomicrobiia	Opitutales	Opitutaceae	
"Lacunisphaera"	Rast et al. 2017	Verrucomicrobiota	Verrucomicrobiia	Opitutales	Opitutaceae	
"Lotipaludicoccus"	Park et al. 2026	Verrucomicrobiota	Verrucomicrobiia	Opitutales	Opitutaceae	
Nibricoccus	Baek et al. 2019	Verrucomicrobiota	Verrucomicrobiia	Opitutales	Opitutaceae	
Oleiharenicola	Rochman et al. 2018	Verrucomicrobiota	Verrucomicrobiia	Opitutales	Opitutaceae	
Opitutus	Chin, Liesack & Janssen 2001	Verrucomicrobiota	Verrucomicrobiia	Opitutales	Opitutaceae	
Pelagicoccus	Yoon et al. 2007	Verrucomicrobiota	Verrucomicrobiia	Opitutales	Opitutaceae	
"Ca. Pelagisphaera"	Bar-Shalom et al. 2023	Verrucomicrobiota	Verrucomicrobiia	Opitutales	Opitutaceae	
Rariglobus	Pitt et al. 2020	Verrucomicrobiota	Verrucomicrobiia	Opitutales	Opitutaceae	
"Ca. Salsuginivita"	Prabhu et al. 2024	Verrucomicrobiota	Verrucomicrobiia	Opitutales	Opitutaceae	
"Ca. Synoicihabitans"	Murray et al. 2021	Verrucomicrobiota	Verrucomicrobiia	Opitutales	Opitutaceae	
"Termitidicoccus"	Mei et al. 2023	Verrucomicrobiota	Verrucomicrobiia	Opitutales	Opitutaceae	
"Terrisphaera"	Yoon, Lee & Park 2026 non Ivanova et al. 2026	Planctomycetota	Phycisphaeria			
"Ca. Fucivorax"	Orellana et al. 2022	Verrucomicrobiota	Verrucomicrobiia	Opitutales	Puniceicoccaceae	
"Ca. Marcellius"	Nixon et al. 2019	Verrucomicrobiota	Verrucomicrobiia	Opitutales	Puniceicoccaceae	
"Ca. Pinguicoccus"	Serra et al. 2020	Verrucomicrobiota	Verrucomicrobiia	Opitutales	Puniceicoccaceae	
Puniceicoccus	Choo et al. 2007	Verrucomicrobiota	Verrucomicrobiia	Opitutales	Puniceicoccaceae	
"Ca. Chordibacter"	Wilkie & Olrellana 2024	Verrucomicrobiota	Verrucomicrobiia	Opitutales	"Seribacteraceae"	
"Ca. Seribacter"	Wilkie & Olrellana 2024	Verrucomicrobiota	Verrucomicrobiia	Opitutales	"Seribacteraceae"	
"Ca. Spyradosoma"	Gilroy et al. 2021	Verrucomicrobiota	Verrucomicrobiia	Opitutales	"Spyradosomataceae"	
"Verruconatronum"	Sorokin et al. 2026	Verrucomicrobiota	Verrucomicrobiia	Opitutales	"Verruconatronaceae"	
"Chthoniobacter"	Sangwan et al. 2004	Verrucomicrobiota	Verrucomicrobiia	Terrimicrobiales	"Chthoniobacteraceae"	
"Ca. Chthoniomicrobium"	Rakitin et al. 2024	Verrucomicrobiota	Verrucomicrobiia	Terrimicrobiales	"Chthoniobacteraceae"	
Cryoterrimicrobium	Tan et al. 2026	Verrucomicrobiota	Verrucomicrobiia	Terrimicrobiales	Terrimicrobiaceae	
Terrimicrobium	Qiu et al. 2014	Verrucomicrobiota	Verrucomicrobiia	Terrimicrobiales	Terrimicrobiaceae	
"Ca. Udaeobacter"	Brewer et al. 2016	Verrucomicrobiota	Verrucomicrobiia	Terrimicrobiales	"Udaeobacteraceae"	
"Ca. Xiphinematobacter"	Vandekerckhove et al. 2000	Verrucomicrobiota	Verrucomicrobiia	Terrimicrobiales	"Xiphinematobacteraceae"	
Sulfuriroseicoccus	Feng et al. 2022	Verrucomicrobiota	Verrucomicrobiia	Verrucomicrobiales	SLCJ01	
Akkermansia	Derrien et al. 2004	Verrucomicrobiota	Verrucomicrobiia	Verrucomicrobiales	Akkermansiaceae	Neoakkermansia Dali et al. 2026
Haloferula	Yoon et al. 2008	Verrucomicrobiota	Verrucomicrobiia	Verrucomicrobiales	Akkermansiaceae	Neoluteolibacter Dali et al. 2026
Luteolibacter	Yoon et al. 2008	Verrucomicrobiota	Verrucomicrobiia	Verrucomicrobiales	Akkermansiaceae	
"Ca. Mariakkermansia"	Orellana et al. 2022	Verrucomicrobiota	Verrucomicrobiia	Verrucomicrobiales	Akkermansiaceae	
Oceaniferula	Jin et al. 2022	Verrucomicrobiota	Verrucomicrobiia	Verrucomicrobiales	Akkermansiaceae	
Persicirhabdus	Yoon et al. 2008	Verrucomicrobiota	Verrucomicrobiia	Verrucomicrobiales	Akkermansiaceae	
Roseibacillus	Yoon et al. 2008	Verrucomicrobiota	Verrucomicrobiia	Verrucomicrobiales	Akkermansiaceae	
Rubritalea	Scheuermayer et al. 2006	Verrucomicrobiota	Verrucomicrobiia	Verrucomicrobiales	Akkermansiaceae	
"Fucophilus"	Sakai et al. 2001	Verrucomicrobiota	Verrucomicrobiia	Verrucomicrobiales	Verrucomicrobiaceae	
"Ca. Parakkermansia"	Dali et al. 2026	Verrucomicrobiota	Verrucomicrobiia	Verrucomicrobiales	Verrucomicrobiaceae	
Phragmitibacter	Szuróczki et al. 2021	Verrucomicrobiota	Verrucomicrobiia	Verrucomicrobiales	Verrucomicrobiaceae	"Verrucobacter" Szuróczki et al. 2018
Prosthecobacter	Staley et al. 1976 ex Staley et al. 1980	Verrucomicrobiota	Verrucomicrobiia	Verrucomicrobiales	Verrucomicrobiaceae	Brevifollis Otsuka et al. 2013
Roseimicrobium	Otsuka et al. 2013	Verrucomicrobiota	Verrucomicrobiia	Verrucomicrobiales	Verrucomicrobiaceae	
Verrucomicrobium	Schlesner 1988	Verrucomicrobiota	Verrucomicrobiia	Verrucomicrobiales	Verrucomicrobiaceae	
"Ca. Amphithomicrobium"	Paoli et al. 2022	Vulcanimicrobiota	"Eudoromicrobiia"	"Eudoremicrobiales"	"Eudoremicrobiaceae"	
"Ca. Autonomicrobium"	Paoli et al. 2022	Vulcanimicrobiota	"Eudoromicrobiia"	"Eudoremicrobiales"	"Eudoremicrobiaceae"	
"Ca. Eudoromicrobium"	corrig. Paoli et al. 2022	Vulcanimicrobiota	"Eudoromicrobiia"	"Eudoremicrobiales"	"Eudoremicrobiaceae"	
"Ca. Lamibacter"	Pessi et al. 2024	Vulcanimicrobiota	"Eudoromicrobiia"	"Eudoremicrobiales"	"Eudoremicrobiaceae"	
"Ca. Eremiobacter"	Ji et al. 2021	Vulcanimicrobiota	Vulcanimicrobiia	"Eremiobacterales"	"Eremiobacteraceae"	
"Ca. Mawsoniella"	Ji et al. 2021	Vulcanimicrobiota	Vulcanimicrobiia	"Eremiobacterales"	"Eremiobacteraceae"	
"Ca. Aquilonibacter"	Ji et al. 2021	Vulcanimicrobiota	Vulcanimicrobiia	Vulcanimicrobiales	Vulcanimicrobiaceae	
"Ca. Baltobacter"	Ward, Cardona & Holland-Moritz 2019	Vulcanimicrobiota	Vulcanimicrobiia	Vulcanimicrobiales	Vulcanimicrobiaceae	"Ca. Palusbacter" Ward, Cardona & Holland-Moritz 2019
"Ca. Cryoxeromicrobium"	Ji et al. 2021	Vulcanimicrobiota	Vulcanimicrobiia	Vulcanimicrobiales	Vulcanimicrobiaceae	
"Ca. Cybelea"	Ji et al. 2021	Vulcanimicrobiota	Vulcanimicrobiia	Vulcanimicrobiales	Vulcanimicrobiaceae	
"Ca. Elarobacter"	Ji et al. 2021	Vulcanimicrobiota	Vulcanimicrobiia	Vulcanimicrobiales	Vulcanimicrobiaceae	
"Ca. Erobacter"	corrig. Ji et al. 2021	Vulcanimicrobiota	Vulcanimicrobiia	Vulcanimicrobiales	Vulcanimicrobiaceae	
"Ca. Hemerobacter"	Ji et al. 2021	Vulcanimicrobiota	Vulcanimicrobiia	Vulcanimicrobiales	Vulcanimicrobiaceae	
"Ca. Hesperobacter"	Ji et al. 2021	Vulcanimicrobiota	Vulcanimicrobiia	Vulcanimicrobiales	Vulcanimicrobiaceae	
"Ca. Lustribacter"	Ji et al. 2021	Vulcanimicrobiota	Vulcanimicrobiia	Vulcanimicrobiales	Vulcanimicrobiaceae	
"Ca. Meridianibacter"	Ji et al. 2021	Vulcanimicrobiota	Vulcanimicrobiia	Vulcanimicrobiales	Vulcanimicrobiaceae	
"Ca. Nyctobacter"	Ji et al. 2021	Vulcanimicrobiota	Vulcanimicrobiia	Vulcanimicrobiales	Vulcanimicrobiaceae	
"Ca. Palsibacter"	Ji et al. 2021	Vulcanimicrobiota	Vulcanimicrobiia	Vulcanimicrobiales	Vulcanimicrobiaceae	
"Ca. Rubrimentiphilum"	Ji et al. 2021	Vulcanimicrobiota	Vulcanimicrobiia	Vulcanimicrobiales	Vulcanimicrobiaceae	
"Ca. Tityobacter"	Ji et al. 2021	Vulcanimicrobiota	Vulcanimicrobiia	Vulcanimicrobiales	Vulcanimicrobiaceae	
"Ca. Tumulicola"	Ji et al. 2021	Vulcanimicrobiota	Vulcanimicrobiia	Vulcanimicrobiales	Vulcanimicrobiaceae	
"Ca. Tyrphobacter"	Ji et al. 2021	Vulcanimicrobiota	Vulcanimicrobiia	Vulcanimicrobiales	Vulcanimicrobiaceae	
"Ca. Velthaea"	Ji et al. 2021	Vulcanimicrobiota	Vulcanimicrobiia	Vulcanimicrobiales	Vulcanimicrobiaceae	
Vulcanimicrobium	Yabe et al. 2023	Vulcanimicrobiota	Vulcanimicrobiia	Vulcanimicrobiales	Vulcanimicrobiaceae	"Ca. Elarobacter" Ji et al. 2021
"Ca. Zemynaea"	Ji et al. 2021 non Bowman 2023	Vulcanimicrobiota	Vulcanimicrobiia	Vulcanimicrobiales	Vulcanimicrobiaceae	
"Ca. Bruticola"	Ji et al. 2021	Vulcanimicrobiota	"Xenobia"	"Xenobiales"	"Xenobiaceae"	
"Ca. Xenobium"	Ji et al. 2021	Vulcanimicrobiota	"Xenobia"	"Xenobiales"	"Xenobiaceae"	
"Xuanmingibacter"	Zhang et al. 2026	"Xuanmingibacterota"	"Xuanmingibacteria"	"Xuanmingibacterales"	"Xuanmingibacteraceae"	
"Yinglongibacter"	Zhang et al. 2026	"Yinglongibacterota"	"Yinglongibacteria"	"Yinglongibacterales"	"Yinglongibacteraceae"	
"Ca. Cosmopolia"	Zhang et al. 2023	"Zhuqueibacterota"	"Cosmopolitia"	"Cosmopoliales"	"Cosmopoliaceae"	QNDG01
"Ca. Marinivivens"	Lian et al. 2024	"Zhuqueibacterota"	"Zhuqueibacteria"	"Oceanimicrobiales"	"Mariniviventaceae"	
"Oceanimicrobium"	Lian et al. 2024	"Zhuqueibacterota"	"Zhuqueibacteria"	"Oceanimicrobiales"	"Oceanimicrobiaceae"	
"Ca. Geothermovivens"	Lian et al. 2024	"Zhuqueibacterota"	"Zhuqueibacteria"	"Oleimicrobiales"	"Geothermoviventaceae"	
"Zestofontihabitans"	Lian et al. 2024	"Zhuqueibacterota"	"Zhuqueibacteria"	"Oleimicrobiales"	"Geothermoviventaceae"	
"Oleimicrobium"	Lian et al. 2024	"Zhuqueibacterota"	"Zhuqueibacteria"	"Oleimicrobiales"	"Oleimicrobiaceae"	
"Fontimicrobium"	Lian et al. 2024	"Zhuqueibacterota"	"Zhuqueibacteria"	"Residuimicrobiales"	"Krinioviventaceae"	
"Fontivivens"	Lian et al. 2024	"Zhuqueibacterota"	"Zhuqueibacteria"	"Residuimicrobiales"	"Krinioviventaceae"	
"Hydrothermomicrobium"	Lian et al. 2024	"Zhuqueibacterota"	"Zhuqueibacteria"	"Residuimicrobiales"	"Krinioviventaceae"	
"Kriniovivens"	Lian et al. 2024	"Zhuqueibacterota"	"Zhuqueibacteria"	"Residuimicrobiales"	"Krinioviventaceae"	
"Oceaniaggregativivens"	Lian et al. 2024	"Zhuqueibacterota"	"Zhuqueibacteria"	"Residuimicrobiales"	"Oceaniaggregativiventaceae"	
"Sulfursilanivivens"	Lian et al. 2024	"Zhuqueibacterota"	"Zhuqueibacteria"	"Residuimicrobiales"	"Oceaniaggregativiventaceae"	
"Anaerohabitans"	Lian et al. 2024	"Zhuqueibacterota"	"Zhuqueibacteria"	"Residuimicrobiales"	"Residuimicrobiaceae"	
"Residuimicrobium"	Lian et al. 2024	"Zhuqueibacterota"	"Zhuqueibacteria"	"Residuimicrobiales"	"Residuimicrobiaceae"	
"Sediminimicrobium"	Lian et al. 2024	"Zhuqueibacterota"	"Zhuqueibacteria"	"Residuimicrobiales"	"Sediminimicrobiaceae"	
"Sulfurfontimicrobium"	Lian et al. 2024	"Zhuqueibacterota"	"Zhuqueibacteria"	"Thermofontimicrobiales"	"Sulfurfontimicrobiaceae"	
"Kaytiofontadaptatus"	Lian et al. 2024	"Zhuqueibacterota"	"Zhuqueibacteria"	"Thermofontimicrobiales"	"Thermofontimicrobiaceae"	
"Ca. Nigeripontimicrobium"	Lian et al. 2024	"Zhuqueibacterota"	"Zhuqueibacteria"	"Thermofontimicrobiales"	"Thermofontimicrobiaceae"	
"Thermofontimicrobium"	Lian et al. 2024	"Zhuqueibacterota"	"Zhuqueibacteria"	"Thermofontimicrobiales"	"Thermofontimicrobiaceae"	
"Ca. Mariaggregatimicrobium"	Lian et al. 2024	"Zhuqueibacterota"	"Zhuqueibacteria"	"Thermofontimicrobiales"	"Thiofontviventaceae"	
"Ca. Thiofontadaptatus"	Lian et al. 2024	"Zhuqueibacterota"	"Zhuqueibacteria"	"Thermofontimicrobiales"	"Thiofontviventaceae"	
"Ca. Thiofontivivens"	Lian et al. 2024	"Zhuqueibacterota"	"Zhuqueibacteria"	"Thermofontimicrobiales"	"Thiofontviventaceae"	
"Bioreactorimicrobium"	Lian et al. 2024	"Zhuqueibacterota"	"Zhuqueibacteria"	"Zhuqueibacterales"	"Geothermadaptataceae"	
"Geothermadaptatus"	Lian et al. 2024	"Zhuqueibacterota"	"Zhuqueibacteria"	"Zhuqueibacterales"	"Geothermadaptataceae"	
"Hydrothermovivens"	Lian et al. 2024	"Zhuqueibacterota"	"Zhuqueibacteria"	"Zhuqueibacterales"	"Geothermadaptataceae"	
"Oceanithermomicrobium"	Lian et al. 2024	"Zhuqueibacterota"	"Zhuqueibacteria"	"Zhuqueibacterales"	"Geothermadaptataceae"	
"Coneutiohabitans"	Lian et al. 2024	"Zhuqueibacterota"	"Zhuqueibacteria"	"Zhuqueibacterales"	"Zhuqueibacteraceae"	
"Zhuqueibacter"	Lian et al. 2024	"Zhuqueibacterota"	"Zhuqueibacteria"	"Zhuqueibacterales"	"Zhuqueibacteraceae"	
"Ca. Zhurongbacter"	Leng et al. 2023	"Zhurongbacterota"				
Caecibacterium	Oren et al. 2019	Bacillota incertae sedis				
"Colidextribacter"	Ricaboni et al. 2017	Bacillota incertae sedis				
Gelria	Plugge et al. 2002	Bacillota incertae sedis				
"Ca. Itsasoibacter"	Porcel Sanchis et al. 2026	Bacillota incertae sedis		"Itsasoibacterales"	"Itsasoibacteraceae"	
Thermolithobacter	Sokolova et al. 2007	Bacillota incertae sedis	Thermolithobacteria	Thermolithobacterales	Thermolithobacteraceae	
"Acetivibrioides"	Liu et al. 2020	"Clostridiota"	"Clostridiia"			
"Caldanaerocella"	Diaz et al. 2004	"Clostridiota"	"Clostridiia"			
Linmingia	Ming, Nanqi & Yang 2002	"Clostridiota"	"Clostridiia"			
Metabacterium	Chatton & Perard 1913	"Clostridiota"	"Clostridiia"			
Mucibacterium	Liu et al. 2020	"Clostridiota"	"Clostridiia"			
"Ca. Neoarthromitus"	corrig. Snel et al. 1995	"Clostridiota"	"Clostridiia"			"Arthromitus" Leidy 1849; "Ca. Arthromitus" Snel et al. 1995; "Entomitus" Grassé 1924
"Ca. Betaina"	corrig. Jones et al. 2019	"Clostridiota"	"Clostridiia"		"Betainaceae"	
Thermoclostridium	Zhang et al. 2018b	"Clostridiota"	"Clostridiia"	DSM-8532	"Thermoclostridiaceae"	
Anaerobacterium	Horino, Fujita & Tonouchi 2014	"Clostridiota"	"Clostridiia"	Acetivibrionales	"Anaerobacteriaceae"	
Acetivibrio	Patel et al. 1980	"Clostridiota"	"Clostridiia"	Acetivibrionales	Hungateiclostridiaceae	
Herbivorax	Koeck et al. 2016d	"Clostridiota"	"Clostridiia"	Acetivibrionales	Hungateiclostridiaceae	
Hungateiclostridium	Zhang et al. 2018b	"Clostridiota"	"Clostridiia"	Acetivibrionales	Hungateiclostridiaceae	
Pseudobacteroides	Horino, Fujita & Tonouchi 2014	"Clostridiota"	"Clostridiia"	Acetivibrionales	"Pseudobacteroidaceae"	
Cellulosibacter	Watthanalamloet et al. 2012	"Clostridiota"	"Clostridiia"	Acetivibrionales	"Ruminiclostridiaceae"	
Pseudoclostridium	Zhang et al. 2018b	"Clostridiota"	"Clostridiia"	Acetivibrionales	"Ruminiclostridiaceae"	
Ruminiclostridium	Zhang et al. 2018	"Clostridiota"	"Clostridiia"	Acetivibrionales	"Ruminiclostridiaceae"	
"Congzhengia"	Liu et al. 2021	"Clostridiota"	"Clostridiia"	"Avimonoglobales"	UBA9506	
"Ca. Aphodoplasma"	Gilroy et al. 2021	"Clostridiota"	"Clostridiia"	"Avimonoglobales"	"Aphodoplasmaceae"	
"Ca. Avimonoglobus"	Gilroy et al. 2021	"Clostridiota"	"Clostridiia"	"Avimonoglobales"	"Avimonoglobaceae"	
Hominilimicola	Afrizal et al. 2023	"Clostridiota"	"Clostridiia"	"Avimonoglobales"	"Avimonoglobaceae"	
"Ca. Ornithomonoglobus"	Gilroy et al. 2021	"Clostridiota"	"Clostridiia"	"Avimonoglobales"	"Avimonoglobaceae"	
Caldicoprobacter	Yokoyama, Wagner & Wiegel 2010	"Clostridiota"	"Clostridiia"	Caldicoprobacterales	Caldicoprobacteraceae	
Xylanivirga	Liu et al. 2020	"Clostridiota"	"Clostridiia"	Caldicoprobacterales	Xylanivirgaceae	
Luoshenia	Liu et al. 2022	"Clostridiota"	"Clostridiia"	Christensenellales	GCA-900066905	
Gehongia	Liu et al. 2022	"Clostridiota"	"Clostridiia"	Christensenellales	NSJ-53	
"Ca. Neochristensenella"	Glendinning et al. 2020	"Clostridiota"	"Clostridiia"	Christensenellales	QALW01	
"Ca. Allochristensenella"	Glendinning et al. 2020	"Clostridiota"	"Clostridiia"	Christensenellales	"Allochristensenellaceae"	
"Ca. Alloclostridium"	Gilroy et al. 2021	"Clostridiota"	"Clostridiia"	Christensenellales	"Alloclostridiaceae"	
"Ca. Caccalectryoclostridium"	Gilroy et al. 2021	"Clostridiota"	"Clostridiia"	Christensenellales	"Alloclostridiaceae"	
"Ca. Ornithoclostridium"	Gilroy et al. 2021	"Clostridiota"	"Clostridiia"	Christensenellales	"Alloclostridiaceae"	
"Ca. Aphodomorpha"	Gilroy et al. 2021	"Clostridiota"	"Clostridiia"	Christensenellales	"Aphodomorphaceae"	
"Ca. Pelethousia"	Gilroy et al. 2021	"Clostridiota"	"Clostridiia"	Christensenellales	"Aphodomorphaceae"	
"Ca. Alectryocaccomicrobium"	Glendinning et al. 2020	"Clostridiota"	"Clostridiia"	Christensenellales	Aristaeellaceae	"Ca. Ornithocaccomicrobium" Gilroy et al. 2021
"Ca. Aphodomonas"	Gilroy et al. 2021	"Clostridiota"	"Clostridiia"	Christensenellales	Aristaeellaceae	
Aristaeella	Mahoney-Kurpe et al. 2023	"Clostridiota"	"Clostridiia"	Christensenellales	Aristaeellaceae	
"Ca. Avichristensenella"	Gilroy et al. 2021	"Clostridiota"	"Clostridiia"	Christensenellales	Aristaeellaceae	
"Beduinella"	Traore et al. 2016	"Clostridiota"	"Clostridiia"	Christensenellales	Aristaeellaceae	
"Ca. Egerieenecus"	Gilroy et al. 2021	"Clostridiota"	"Clostridiia"	Christensenellales	Aristaeellaceae	
"Ca. Excrementavichristensenella"	Gilroy et al. 2021	"Clostridiota"	"Clostridiia"	Christensenellales	Aristaeellaceae	
"Ca. Faecaligallichristensenella"	Gilroy et al. 2021	"Clostridiota"	"Clostridiia"	Christensenellales	Aristaeellaceae	
"Ca. Faecivicinus"	Gilroy et al. 2021	"Clostridiota"	"Clostridiia"	Christensenellales	Aristaeellaceae	
"Ca. Fimadaptatus"	Gilroy et al. 2021	"Clostridiota"	"Clostridiia"	Christensenellales	Aristaeellaceae	
"Ca. Limiplasma"	Gilroy et al. 2021	"Clostridiota"	"Clostridiia"	Christensenellales	Aristaeellaceae	
"Ca. Onthenecus"	Gilroy et al. 2021	"Clostridiota"	"Clostridiia"	Christensenellales	Aristaeellaceae	
"Ca. Pullichristensenella"	Gilroy et al. 2021	"Clostridiota"	"Clostridiia"	Christensenellales	Aristaeellaceae	
"Ca. Ventricola"	Gilroy et al. 2021	"Clostridiota"	"Clostridiia"	Christensenellales	Aristaeellaceae	
"Ca. Borkfalkia"	Hildebrand et al. 2019	"Clostridiota"	"Clostridiia"	Christensenellales	"Borkfalkiaceae"	
"Ca. Caballimonas"	Gilroy et al. 2022	"Clostridiota"	"Clostridiia"	Christensenellales	"Borkfalkiaceae"	
"Ca. Coproplasma"	Gilroy et al. 2021	"Clostridiota"	"Clostridiia"	Christensenellales	"Borkfalkiaceae"	
"Ca. Gallimonas"	Gilroy et al. 2021	"Clostridiota"	"Clostridiia"	Christensenellales	"Borkfalkiaceae"	
"Ca. Scatosoma"	Gilroy et al. 2021	"Clostridiota"	"Clostridiia"	Christensenellales	"Borkfalkiaceae"	
"Beduinibacterium"	Traore et al. 2017	"Clostridiota"	"Clostridiia"	Christensenellales	Christensenellaceae	
Christensenella	Morotomi et al. 2012	"Clostridiota"	"Clostridiia"	Christensenellales	Christensenellaceae	Catabacter Lau et al. 2014
Guopingia	Liu et al. 2022	"Clostridiota"	"Clostridiia"	Christensenellales	Christensenellaceae	
"Ca. Scybalosoma"	Gilroy et al. 2021	"Clostridiota"	"Clostridiia"	Christensenellales	Christensenellaceae	
"Ca. Faecicola"	Gilroy et al. 2021	"Clostridiota"	"Clostridiia"	Christensenellales	"Faecicolaceae"	
"Ca. Limadaptatus"	Gilroy et al. 2021	"Clostridiota"	"Clostridiia"	Christensenellales	"Faecicolaceae"	
"Ca. Fimimonas"	Gilroy et al. 2021	"Clostridiota"	"Clostridiia"	Christensenellales	"Limihabitantaceae"	
"Ca. Heteroclostridium"	Glendinning et al. 2020	"Clostridiota"	"Clostridiia"	Christensenellales	"Limihabitantaceae"	
"Ca. Limihabitans"	Gilroy et al. 2021	"Clostridiota"	"Clostridiia"	Christensenellales	"Limihabitantaceae"	
"Maliibacterium"	Traore et al. 2023	"Clostridiota"	"Clostridiia"	Christensenellales	"Maliibacteriaceae"	
"Ca. Apopatousia"	Gilroy et al. 2022	"Clostridiota"	"Clostridiia"	Christensenellales	"Onthoplasmataceae"	
"Ca. Caccopulliclostridium"	Gilroy et al. 2021	"Clostridiota"	"Clostridiia"	Christensenellales	"Onthoplasmataceae"	
"Ca. Caccovivens"	Gilroy et al. 2021	"Clostridiota"	"Clostridiia"	Christensenellales	"Onthoplasmataceae"	
"Ca. Onthoplasma"	Gilroy et al. 2021	"Clostridiota"	"Clostridiia"	Christensenellales	"Onthoplasmataceae"	
"Ca. Parachristensenella"	Glendinning et al. 2020	"Clostridiota"	"Clostridiia"	Christensenellales	"Parachristensenellaceae"	
Anaerocaecibacter	Afrizal et al. 2024	"Clostridiota"	"Clostridiia"	Christensenellales	Pumilibacteraceae	
"Ca. Neoclostridium"	Glendinning et al. 2020	"Clostridiota"	"Clostridiia"	Christensenellales	Pumilibacteraceae	
Pumilibacter	Afrizal et al. 2024	"Clostridiota"	"Clostridiia"	Christensenellales	Pumilibacteraceae	
"Ca. Protoclostridium"	Glendinning et al. 2021	"Clostridiota"	"Clostridiia"	Christensenellales	Pumilibacteraceae	
"Ca. Stercoripulliclostridium"	Gilroy et al. 2021	"Clostridiota"	"Clostridiia"	Christensenellales	"Stercoripulliclostridiaceae"	
"Ca. Spyradocola"	Gilroy et al. 2021	"Clostridiota"	"Clostridiia"	Christensenellales	"Spyradocolaceae"	
Caloramator	Collins et al. 1994	"Clostridiota"	"Clostridiia"	Clostridiales	Caloramatoraceae	
Fervidicella	Ogg & Patel 2010	"Clostridiota"	"Clostridiia"	Clostridiales	Caloramatoraceae	
Fonticella	Fraj et al. 2013	"Clostridiota"	"Clostridiia"	Clostridiales	Caloramatoraceae	
Thermobrachium	Engle et al. 1996	"Clostridiota"	"Clostridiia"	Clostridiales	Caloramatoraceae	
Anaerobacter	Duda et al. 1996	"Clostridiota"	"Clostridiia"	Clostridiales	Clostridiaceae	
Clostridium	Trécul 1865 ex Prazmowski 1880	"Clostridiota"	"Clostridiia"	Clostridiales	Clostridiaceae	"Arloingillus" Heller 1922; "Butyribacillus" Jensen 1909; ?"Butyriclostridium" Orla-Jensen 1921; "Chauvoea" Pribram 1929; "Cillobacterium" Prévot 1938; "Henrillus" Heller 1922; "Hiblerillus" Heller 1922; ?"Putriclostridium" Orla-Jensen 1921; "Rivoltillus" Heller 1921; "Tissierillus" Heller 1922
Dwaynesavagella	Thompson et al. 2012 corrig. Oren et al. 2020	"Clostridiota"	"Clostridiia"	Clostridiales	Clostridiaceae	"Ca. Savagella" Thompson et al. 2012 non Foerste 1920 non Geis 1932; "Ca. Dwaynia" corrig. Thompson et al. 2012
"Desnuesiella"	Hadjadj et al. 2016	"Clostridiota"	"Clostridiia"	Clostridiales	Clostridiaceae	
Haloimpatiens	Wu et al. 2016	"Clostridiota"	"Clostridiia"	Clostridiales	Clostridiaceae	"Khelaifiella" Tidjani Alou et al. 2017
Hathewaya	Lawson & Rainey 2016	"Clostridiota"	"Clostridiia"	Clostridiales	Clostridiaceae	"Weinbergillus" Heller 1922
Inconstantimicrobium	Wylensek et al. 2021	"Clostridiota"	"Clostridiia"	Clostridiales	Clostridiaceae	
Oceanirhabdus	Pi et al. 2013	"Clostridiota"	"Clostridiia"	Clostridiales	Clostridiaceae	
Pilosibacter	Yan et al. 2024	"Clostridiota"	"Clostridiia"	Clostridiales	Clostridiaceae	
Proteiniclasticum	Zhang, Song & Dong 2010	"Clostridiota"	"Clostridiia"	Clostridiales	Clostridiaceae	
Sarcina	Goodsir 1842	"Clostridiota"	"Clostridiia"	Clostridiales	Clostridiaceae	"Butyrisarcina" Kluyver & Van Niel 1936; "Urosarcina" (Miquel 1888) Miquel 1893; "Welchia" Pribram 1929 ex Prévot 1933; "Welchillus" Heller 1922; "Zymosarcina" Smit 1930
Youngiibacter	Lawson et al. 2014	"Clostridiota"	"Clostridiia"	Clostridiales	Clostridiaceae	
"Vallorillus"	Heller 1922	"Clostridiota"	"Clostridiia"	Clostridiales	Clostridiaceae	
Oxobacter	Collins et al. 1994	"Clostridiota"	"Clostridiia"	Clostridiales	Oxobacteraceae	
"Ca. Egerieisoma"	Gilroy et al. 2021	"Clostridiota"	"Clostridiia"	"Egerieisomatales"	"Egerieisomataceae"	
Alkalibacter	Garnova et al. 2005	"Clostridiota"	"Clostridiia"	Eubacteriales	Alkalibacteraceae	
Alkalibaculum	Allen et al. 2010	"Clostridiota"	"Clostridiia"	Eubacteriales	Alkalibacteraceae	
Anaerofustis	Finegold et al. 2004	"Clostridiota"	"Clostridiia"	Eubacteriales	Anaerofustaceae	
Acetobacterium	Balch et al. 1977 non Ludwig 1898	"Clostridiota"	"Clostridiia"	Eubacteriales	Eubacteriaceae	
Eubacterium	Janke 1930 ex Prévot 1938	"Clostridiota"	"Clostridiia"	Eubacteriales	Eubacteriaceae	"Butyribacterium" Barker & Haas 1944
Pseudoramibacter	Willems & Collins 1996	"Clostridiota"	"Clostridiia"	Eubacteriales	Eubacteriaceae	
Garciella	Miranda-Tello et al. 2003	"Clostridiota"	"Clostridiia"	Eubacteriales	Garciellaceae	
Irregularibacter	Lagkouvardos et al. 2016	"Clostridiota"	"Clostridiia"	Eubacteriales	Garciellaceae	
Rhabdanaerobium	Liu et al. 2017	"Clostridiota"	"Clostridiia"	Eubacteriales	Garciellaceae	
Anaeropeptidivorans	Köller et al. 2022	"Clostridiota"	"Clostridiia"	Lachnospirales	UBA5962	
Anaerotignum	Ueki et al. 2017	"Clostridiota"	"Clostridiia"	Lachnospirales	Anaerotignaceae	
"Ca. Coprocola"	Gilroy et al. 2021	"Clostridiota"	"Clostridiia"	Lachnospirales	Anaerotignaceae	
"Ca. Fimicola"	Gilroy et al. 2021	"Clostridiota"	"Clostridiia"	Lachnospirales	Anaerotignaceae	
"Ca. Metalachnospira"	Glendinning et al. 2020	"Clostridiota"	"Clostridiia"	Lachnospirales	Anaerotignaceae	
"Ca. Neoanaerotignum"	Glendinning et al. 2020	"Clostridiota"	"Clostridiia"	Lachnospirales	Anaerotignaceae	
"Bianquea"	Liu et al. 2021	"Clostridiota"	"Clostridiia"	Lachnospirales	"Bianqueaceae"	
"Ca. Faecimorpha"	Gilroy et al. 2021	"Clostridiota"	"Clostridiia"	Lachnospirales	"Bianqueaceae"	
Cellulosilyticum	Cai & Dong 2010	"Clostridiota"	"Clostridiia"	Lachnospirales	Cellulosilyticaceae	
Epulonipiscium	corrig. Montgomery & Pollak 1988	"Clostridiota"	"Clostridiia"	Lachnospirales	Cellulosilyticaceae	
Holtiella	Allen-Vercoe et al. 2023	"Clostridiota"	"Clostridiia"	Lachnospirales	Cellulosilyticaceae	
"Ca. Parepulonipiscium"	corrig. Ngugi et al. 2017	"Clostridiota"	"Clostridiia"	Lachnospirales	Cellulosilyticaceae	
"Sporanaerobium"	Hivarkar et al. 2023	"Clostridiota"	"Clostridiia"	Lachnospirales	Cellulosilyticaceae	
Zhenhengia	Liu et al. 2022	"Clostridiota"	"Clostridiia"	Lachnospirales	Cellulosilyticaceae	"Niameybacter" Tidjani Alou et al. 2017
Defluviitalea	Jabari et al. 2012	"Clostridiota"	"Clostridiia"	Lachnospirales	Defluviitaleaceae	
"Ca. Gallispira"	Glendinning et al. 2020	"Clostridiota"	"Clostridiia"	Lachnospirales	"Gallispiraceae"	
"Aequitasia"	Vera-Ponce de Leon et al. 2022	"Clostridiota"	"Clostridiia"	Lachnospirales	Lachnospiraceae	"Ohessyouella" Vera-Ponce de Leon et al. 2022
"Africanella"	Alou, Fournier & Raoult 2016	"Clostridiota"	"Clostridiia"	Lachnospirales	Lachnospiraceae	
Alitiscatomonas	Hitch et al. 2022	"Clostridiota"	"Clostridiia"	Lachnospirales	Lachnospiraceae	
Anaerolentibacter	Yan et al. 2024	"Clostridiota"	"Clostridiia"	Lachnospirales	Lachnospiraceae	
Anaeromicropila	Ueki et al. 2023	"Clostridiota"	"Clostridiia"	Lachnospirales	Lachnospiraceae	
Anaerosporobacter	Jeong et al. 2007	"Clostridiota"	"Clostridiia"	Lachnospirales	Lachnospiraceae	
Anaerotaenia	Ueki et al. 2016	"Clostridiota"	"Clostridiia"	Lachnospirales	Lachnospiraceae	
Bovifimicola	Hitch et al. 2025	"Clostridiota"	"Clostridiia"	Lachnospirales	Lachnospiraceae	
Brotaphodocola	Afrizal et al. 2023	"Clostridiota"	"Clostridiia"	Lachnospirales	Lachnospiraceae	"Ventrimonas" Hitch et al. 2024
Chakrabartyella	Pardesi et al. 2023	"Clostridiota"	"Clostridiia"	Lachnospirales	Lachnospiraceae	
Chordicoccus	Gaffney et al. 2023	"Clostridiota"	"Clostridiia"	Lachnospirales	Lachnospiraceae	
"Ca. Colinaster"	Gilroy et al. 2022	"Clostridiota"	"Clostridiia"	Lachnospirales	Lachnospiraceae	
"Ca. Darwinimomas"	Gilroy et al. 2022	"Clostridiota"	"Clostridiia"	Lachnospirales	Lachnospiraceae	
"Ca. Epulonipiscioides"	corrig. Ngugi et al. 2017	"Clostridiota"	"Clostridiia"	Lachnospirales	Lachnospiraceae	
"Ca. Equihabitans"	Gilroy et al. 2022	"Clostridiota"	"Clostridiia"	Lachnospirales	Lachnospiraceae	
Eshraghiella	Fatahi-Bafghi 2024	"Clostridiota"	"Clostridiia"	Lachnospirales	Lachnospiraceae	
Frisingicoccus	Lagkouvardos et al. 2016	"Clostridiota"	"Clostridiia"	Lachnospirales	Lachnospiraceae	
"Fusibacillus"	Bai et al. 2023 non Pribram 1929	"Clostridiota"	"Clostridiia"	Lachnospirales	Lachnospiraceae	
Fusimonas	Kusada et al. 2017	"Clostridiota"	"Clostridiia"	Lachnospirales	Lachnospiraceae	
Gallintestinimicrobium	Hitch et al. 2022	"Clostridiota"	"Clostridiia"	Lachnospirales	Lachnospiraceae	
"Gluceribacter"	corrig. Kawata et al. 2021	"Clostridiota"	"Clostridiia"	Lachnospirales	Lachnospiraceae	
"Ca. Hippenecus"	Gilroy et al. 2022	"Clostridiota"	"Clostridiia"	Lachnospirales	Lachnospiraceae	
Hominifimenecus	Afrizal et al. 2023	"Clostridiota"	"Clostridiia"	Lachnospirales	Lachnospiraceae	
Hominiventricola	Afrizal et al. 2023	"Clostridiota"	"Clostridiia"	Lachnospirales	Lachnospiraceae	"Ca. Choladocola" Gilroy et al. 2021
Howardella	Cook et al. 2007	"Clostridiota"	"Clostridiia"	Lachnospirales	Lachnospiraceae	
Laedolimicola	Hitch et al. 2022	"Clostridiota"	"Clostridiia"	Lachnospirales	Lachnospiraceae	"Ca. Merdisoma" Gilroy et al. 2021
Lientehia	Abdugheni et al. 2023	"Clostridiota"	"Clostridiia"	Lachnospirales	Lachnospiraceae	"Ca. Paralachnospira" Glendinning et al. 2020; "Qiania" Liu et al. 2021
"Maccoya"	Hitch et al. 2024	"Clostridiota"	"Clostridiia"	Lachnospirales	Lachnospiraceae	
"Ca. Merdinaster"	Gilroy et al. 2022	"Clostridiota"	"Clostridiia"	Lachnospirales	Lachnospiraceae	
"Ca. Minthocola"	Gilroy et al. 2022	"Clostridiota"	"Clostridiia"	Lachnospirales	Lachnospiraceae	
Moryella	Carlier, K'ouas & Han 2007	"Clostridiota"	"Clostridiia"	Lachnospirales	Lachnospiraceae	Stomatobaculum Sizova et al. 2013; "Zandiella" Fatahi-Bafghi 2024
"Ca. Onthocola"	Gilroy et al. 2021	"Clostridiota"	"Clostridiia"	Lachnospirales	Lachnospiraceae	
Otoolea	Afrizal et al. 2023	"Clostridiota"	"Clostridiia"	Lachnospirales	Lachnospiraceae	
"Petralouisia"	Afrizal et al. 2022	"Clostridiota"	"Clostridiia"	Lachnospirales	Lachnospiraceae	
Porcincola	Wylensek et al. 2021	"Clostridiota"	"Clostridiia"	Lachnospirales	Lachnospiraceae	
"Sakamotonia"	Hitch et al. 2024	"Clostridiota"	"Clostridiia"	Lachnospirales	Lachnospiraceae	
Shuttleworthella	Deshmukh & Oren 2024	"Clostridiota"	"Clostridiia"	Lachnospirales	Lachnospiraceae	Shuttleworthia Downes et al. 2002 non Meissner 1840 non Baker 1941
Sporobacterium	Mechichi et al. 1999	"Clostridiota"	"Clostridiia"	Lachnospirales	Lachnospiraceae	
Suonthocola	Hitch et al. 2022	"Clostridiota"	"Clostridiia"	Lachnospirales	Lachnospiraceae	
Syntrophococcus	Krumholz & Bryant 1986	"Clostridiota"	"Clostridiia"	Lachnospirales	Lachnospiraceae	
"Weimerbacter"	Scarborough et al. 2019	"Clostridiota"	"Clostridiia"	Lachnospirales	Lachnospiraceae	
Catenibacillus	Braune & Blaut 2018	"Clostridiota"	"Clostridiia"	Lachnospirales	Lachnospiraceae	"Ca. Scybalocola" Gilroy et al. 2021
"Wujia"	Liu et al. 2021	"Clostridiota"	"Clostridiia"	Lachnospirales	Lachnospiraceae	
Coprococcus	Holdeman & Moore 1974	"Clostridiota"	"Clostridiia"	Lachnospirales	Lachnospiraceae	
"Ca. Scybalomonas"	Gilroy et al. 2021	"Clostridiota"	"Clostridiia"	Lachnospirales	Lachnospiraceae	
Anaerobutyricum	Shetty et al. 2018	"Clostridiota"	"Clostridiia"	Lachnospirales	Lachnospiraceae	
"Ca. Fimousia"	Gilroy et al. 2021	"Clostridiota"	"Clostridiia"	Lachnospirales	Lachnospiraceae	
Anaerostipes	Schwiertz et al. 2002	"Clostridiota"	"Clostridiia"	Lachnospirales	Lachnospiraceae	
Butyribacter	Zou et al. 2021	"Clostridiota"	"Clostridiia"	Lachnospirales	Lachnospiraceae	
Jutongia	Liu et al. 2022	"Clostridiota"	"Clostridiia"	Lachnospirales	Lachnospiraceae	
Catonella	Moore & Moore 1994	"Clostridiota"	"Clostridiia"	Lachnospirales	Lachnospiraceae	
"Ca. Caccomorpha"	Gilroy et al. 2021	"Clostridiota"	"Clostridiia"	Lachnospirales	Lachnospiraceae	
"Lachnoclostridium"	Yutin & Galperin 2013	"Clostridiota"	"Clostridiia"	Lachnospirales	Lachnospiraceae	
Velocimicrobium	Wylensek et al. 2021	"Clostridiota"	"Clostridiia"	Lachnospirales	Lachnospiraceae	"Acetanaerobacter" Zou et al. 2021
Mobilisporobacter	Mbengue et al. 2016	"Clostridiota"	"Clostridiia"	Lachnospirales	Lachnospiraceae	
Mobilitalea	Podosokorskaya et al. 2014	"Clostridiota"	"Clostridiia"	Lachnospirales	Lachnospiraceae	Herbinix Koeck et al. 2015; Variimorphobacter Rettenmaier et al. 2021
Anaerocolumna	Ueki et al. 2016	"Clostridiota"	"Clostridiia"	Lachnospirales	Lachnospiraceae	
Parasporobacterium	Lomans et al. 2004	"Clostridiota"	"Clostridiia"	Lachnospirales	Lachnospiraceae	
Falcatimonas	Watanabe et al. 2016	"Clostridiota"	"Clostridiia"	Lachnospirales	Lachnospiraceae	
Lachnospira	Bryant & Small 1956	"Clostridiota"	"Clostridiia"	Lachnospirales	Lachnospiraceae	
Anthropogastromicrobium	Hitch et al. 2022	"Clostridiota"	"Clostridiia"	Lachnospirales	Lachnospiraceae	
Alitiscatomona	Hitch et al. 2022	"Clostridiota"	"Clostridiia"	Lachnospirales	Lachnospiraceae	
Muricoprocola	Hitch et al. 2022	"Clostridiota"	"Clostridiia"	Lachnospirales	Lachnospiraceae	"Jingyaoa" Liu et al. 2021
Cuneatibacter	Lagkouvardos et al. 2016	"Clostridiota"	"Clostridiia"	Lachnospirales	Lachnospiraceae	
"Ca. Fimimorpha"	Gilroy et al. 2021	"Clostridiota"	"Clostridiia"	Lachnospirales	Lachnospiraceae	
"Ca. Pseudolachnospira"	Glendinning et al. 2020	"Clostridiota"	"Clostridiia"	Lachnospirales	Lachnospiraceae	
"Ca. Avilachnospira"	Gilroy et al. 2021	"Clostridiota"	"Clostridiia"	Lachnospirales	Lachnospiraceae	
Oribacterium	Carlier et al. 2004	"Clostridiota"	"Clostridiia"	Lachnospirales	Lachnospiraceae	
Johnsonella	Moore & Moore 1994	"Clostridiota"	"Clostridiia"	Lachnospirales	Lachnospiraceae	
Lachnoanaerobaculum	Hedberg et al. 2012	"Clostridiota"	"Clostridiia"	Lachnospirales	Lachnospiraceae	
"Ca. Copromonas"	Gilroy et al. 2021 non Dobell 1908	"Clostridiota"	"Clostridiia"	Lachnospirales	Lachnospiraceae	
"Ca. Ventrisoma"	Gilroy et al. 2021	"Clostridiota"	"Clostridiia"	Lachnospirales	Lachnospiraceae	
"Ca. Caccovicinus"	Gilroy et al. 2021	"Clostridiota"	"Clostridiia"	Lachnospirales	Lachnospiraceae	"Ca. Cottocaccomicrobium" Gilroy et al. 2021
Enterocloster	Haas & Blanchard 2020	"Clostridiota"	"Clostridiia"	Lachnospirales	Lachnospiraceae	
Hungatella	Kaur et al. 2014	"Clostridiota"	"Clostridiia"	Lachnospirales	Lachnospiraceae	
Lacrimispora	Haas & Blanchard 2020	"Clostridiota"	"Clostridiia"	Lachnospirales	Lachnospiraceae	"Douglasillus" Heller 1922
Butyrivibrio	Bryant & Small 1956	"Clostridiota"	"Clostridiia"	Lachnospirales	Lachnospiraceae	
Acetatifactor	Pfeiffer et al. 2013	"Clostridiota"	"Clostridiia"	Lachnospirales	Lachnospiraceae	Brotolimicola Hitch et al. 2022; "Simiaoa" Liu et al. 2021; Waltera Wylensek et al. 2021
Kineothrix	Haas & Blanchard 2017	"Clostridiota"	"Clostridiia"	Lachnospirales	Lachnospiraceae	
Suilimivivens	Hitch et al. 2021	"Clostridiota"	"Clostridiia"	Lachnospirales	Lachnospiraceae	"Parablautia" Liu et al. 2020
Eisenbergiella	Amir et al. 2014	"Clostridiota"	"Clostridiia"	Lachnospirales	Lachnospiraceae	
Acetitomaculum	Greening & Leedle 1995	"Clostridiota"	"Clostridiia"	Lachnospirales	Lachnospiraceae	
Pseudobutyrivibrio	van Gylswyk, Hippe & Rainey 1996	"Clostridiota"	"Clostridiia"	Lachnospirales	Lachnospiraceae	
Pararoseburia	Abdugheni et al. 2022	"Clostridiota"	"Clostridiia"	Lachnospirales	Lachnospiraceae	
"Ca. Weimeria"	Scarborough et al. 2020	"Clostridiota"	"Clostridiia"	Lachnospirales	Lachnospiraceae	
Roseburia	Stanton & Savage 1983	"Clostridiota"	"Clostridiia"	Lachnospirales	Lachnospiraceae	
Lachnobacterium	Whitford et al. 2001	"Clostridiota"	"Clostridiia"	Lachnospirales	Lachnospiraceae	
Agathobacter	Rosero et al. 2016	"Clostridiota"	"Clostridiia"	Lachnospirales	Lachnospiraceae	
Brotonthovivens	Hitch et al. 2022	"Clostridiota"	"Clostridiia"	Lachnospirales	Lachnospiraceae	
Diplocloster	Chaplin et al. 2022	"Clostridiota"	"Clostridiia"	Lachnospirales	Lachnospiraceae	
"Ca. Merdenecus"	Gilroy et al. 2021	"Clostridiota"	"Clostridiia"	Lachnospirales	Lachnospiraceae	
Anaerobium	Patil et al. 2015	"Clostridiota"	"Clostridiia"	Lachnospirales	Lachnospiraceae	
Anaerosacchariphilus	Kim et al. 2019	"Clostridiota"	"Clostridiia"	Lachnospirales	Lachnospiraceae	
Lachnotalea	Jarzembowska et al. 2016	"Clostridiota"	"Clostridiia"	Lachnospirales	Lachnospiraceae	"Ca. Galacturonatibacter" corrig. Valk et al. 2018; "Konateibacter" Sarr et al. 2022
Marvinbryantia	Wolin et al. 2008	"Clostridiota"	"Clostridiia"	Lachnospirales	Lachnospiraceae	Bryantella Wolin et al. 2004
Murimonas	Klaring et al. 2015	"Clostridiota"	"Clostridiia"	Lachnospirales	Lachnospiraceae	
Robinsoniella	Cotta et al. 2009	"Clostridiota"	"Clostridiia"	Lachnospirales	Lachnospiraceae	
Hominisplanchenecus	Afrizal et al. 2023	"Clostridiota"	"Clostridiia"	Lachnospirales	Lachnospiraceae	
"Ca. Limivivens"	Gilroy et al. 2021	"Clostridiota"	"Clostridiia"	Lachnospirales	Lachnospiraceae	
"Ca. Merdiplasma"	Gilroy et al. 2021	"Clostridiota"	"Clostridiia"	Lachnospirales	Lachnospiraceae	
"Ca. Choladousia"	Gilroy et al. 2021	"Clostridiota"	"Clostridiia"	Lachnospirales	Lachnospiraceae	
Lactonifactor	Clavel et al. 2007	"Clostridiota"	"Clostridiia"	Lachnospirales	Lachnospiraceae	
Blautia	Liu et al. 2008	"Clostridiota"	"Clostridiia"	Lachnospirales	Lachnospiraceae	
Hoministercoradaptatus	Hitch et al. 2022	"Clostridiota"	"Clostridiia"	Lachnospirales	Lachnospiraceae	
Oliverpabstia	Wylensek et al. 2021	"Clostridiota"	"Clostridiia"	Lachnospirales	Lachnospiraceae	
"Ca. Pullilachnospira"	Gilroy et al. 2021	"Clostridiota"	"Clostridiia"	Lachnospirales	Lachnospiraceae	
"Ca. Egerieimonas"	Gilroy et al. 2021	"Clostridiota"	"Clostridiia"	Lachnospirales	Lachnospiraceae	
"Ca. Alectryocaccobium"	Gilroy et al. 2021	"Clostridiota"	"Clostridiia"	Lachnospirales	Lachnospiraceae	
Fusicatenibacter	Takada et al. 2013	"Clostridiota"	"Clostridiia"	Lachnospirales	Lachnospiraceae	
Novisyntrophococcus	Chai et al. 2021	"Clostridiota"	"Clostridiia"	Lachnospirales	Lachnospiraceae	"Ca. Pelethocola" Gilroy et al. 2021
Bilifractor	Wylensek et al. 2021	"Clostridiota"	"Clostridiia"	Lachnospirales	Lachnospiraceae	
"Ca. Scatomonas"	Gilroy et al. 2021	"Clostridiota"	"Clostridiia"	Lachnospirales	Lachnospiraceae	"Wansuia" Liu et al. 2021
Faecalimonas	Sakamoto, Iino & Ohkuma 2017	"Clostridiota"	"Clostridiia"	Lachnospirales	Lachnospiraceae	"Tyzzerella" Yutin & Galperin 2013
Sellimonas	Seo et al. 2016	"Clostridiota"	"Clostridiia"	Lachnospirales	Lachnospiraceae	
"Bariatricus"	Bessis et al. 2016	"Clostridiota"	"Clostridiia"	Lachnospirales	Lachnospiraceae	
Claveliimonas	Hisatomi et al. 2023	"Clostridiota"	"Clostridiia"	Lachnospirales	Lachnospiraceae	
Suipraeoptans	corrig. Wylensek et al. 2021	"Clostridiota"	"Clostridiia"	Lachnospirales	Lachnospiraceae	
Extibacter	Lagkouvardos et al. 2017	"Clostridiota"	"Clostridiia"	Lachnospirales	Lachnospiraceae	
Dorea	Taras et al. 2002	"Clostridiota"	"Clostridiia"	Lachnospirales	Lachnospiraceae	
"Massilistercora"	Tall et al. 2020	"Clostridiota"	"Clostridiia"	Lachnospirales	Lachnospiraceae	
Merdimonas	Seo et al. 2017	"Clostridiota"	"Clostridiia"	Lachnospirales	Lachnospiraceae	"Mordavella" Ndongo et al. 2017
Sporofaciens	Rasmussen et al. 2021	"Clostridiota"	"Clostridiia"	Lachnospirales	Lachnospiraceae	
Hespellia	Whitehead et al. 2004	"Clostridiota"	"Clostridiia"	Lachnospirales	Lachnospiraceae	
Schaedlerella	Soh et al. 2019	"Clostridiota"	"Clostridiia"	Lachnospirales	Lachnospiraceae	
"Luxibacter"	Naud et al. 2021	"Clostridiota"	"Clostridiia"	Lachnospirales	Lachnospiraceae	
Muricomes	Lagkouvardos et al. 2016	"Clostridiota"	"Clostridiia"	Lachnospirales	Lachnospiraceae	Faecalicatena Sakamoto, Iino & Ohkuma 2017; "Zymobacterium" Wachsman & Barker 1954
Mediterraneibacter	Togo et al. 2019	"Clostridiota"	"Clostridiia"	Lachnospirales	Lachnospiraceae	
Natranaerovirga	Sorokin et al. 2012	"Clostridiota"	"Clostridiia"	Lachnospirales	Natranaerovirgaceae	
Abyssivirga	Schouw et al. 2016	"Clostridiota"	"Clostridiia"	Lachnospirales	Vallitaleaceae	
"Anaerotalea"	Frolova et al. 2021	"Clostridiota"	"Clostridiia"	Lachnospirales	Vallitaleaceae	
Petrocella	Quéméneur et al. 2020	"Clostridiota"	"Clostridiia"	Lachnospirales	Vallitaleaceae	
Vallitalea	Lakhal et al. 2013	"Clostridiota"	"Clostridiia"	Lachnospirales	Vallitaleaceae	
Lutispora	Shiratori et al. 2008	"Clostridiota"	"Clostridiia"	Lutisporales	Lutisporaceae	
Mahella	Bonilla Salinas et al. 2004	"Clostridiota"	"Clostridiia"	Mahellales	Mahellaceae	
"Ca. Merdicola"	Gilroy et al. 2021	"Clostridiota"	"Clostridiia"	"Merdicolales"	"Merdicolaceae"	
"Ca. Scatovivens"	Gilroy et al. 2021	"Clostridiota"	"Clostridiia"	"Merdicolales"	"Merdicolaceae"	
Monoglobus	Kim et al. 2017	"Clostridiota"	"Clostridiia"	Monoglobales	Monoglobaceae	
"Ca. Roslinia"	Glendinning et al. 2020	"Clostridiota"	"Clostridiia"	Monoglobales	Monoglobaceae	
Ructibacterium	Zenner et al. 2021	"Clostridiota"	"Clostridiia"	Monoglobales	Monoglobaceae	
"Ca. Allobutyricicoccus"	Gilroy et al. 2021	"Clostridiota"	"Clostridiia"	"Oscillospirales"	UMGS1384	
Acutalibacter	Lagkouvardos et al. 2016	"Clostridiota"	"Clostridiia"	"Oscillospirales"	Acutalibacteraceae	
"Anaeromassilibacillus"	Guilhot et al. 2017	"Clostridiota"	"Clostridiia"	"Oscillospirales"	Acutalibacteraceae	
"Ca. Avimonas"	Glendinning et al. 2020	"Clostridiota"	"Clostridiia"	"Oscillospirales"	Acutalibacteraceae	
"Ca. Caccousia"	Gilroy et al. 2021	"Clostridiota"	"Clostridiia"	"Oscillospirales"	Acutalibacteraceae	
Caproicibacter	Flaiz et al. 2020	"Clostridiota"	"Clostridiia"	"Oscillospirales"	Acutalibacteraceae	"Caprobacter" Flaiz et al. 2019; Thermocaproicibacter Nguyen et al. 2023
Caproicibacterium	Gu et al. 2021	"Clostridiota"	"Clostridiia"	"Oscillospirales"	Acutalibacteraceae	
Caproiciproducens	Kim et al. 2015	"Clostridiota"	"Clostridiia"	"Oscillospirales"	Acutalibacteraceae	
"Ca. Copronaster"	Gilroy et al. 2022	"Clostridiota"	"Clostridiia"	"Oscillospirales"	Acutalibacteraceae	
"Ca. Equicaccousia"	Gilroy et al. 2022	"Clostridiota"	"Clostridiia"	"Oscillospirales"	Acutalibacteraceae	
"Ca. Equinaster"	Gilroy et al. 2022	"Clostridiota"	"Clostridiia"	"Oscillospirales"	Acutalibacteraceae	
Faecalispora	Rios-Galicia et al. 2024	"Clostridiota"	"Clostridiia"	"Oscillospirales"	Acutalibacteraceae	
"Ca. Fimenecus"	Gilroy et al. 2021	"Clostridiota"	"Clostridiia"	"Oscillospirales"	Acutalibacteraceae	
"Ca. Fimivicinus"	Gilroy et al. 2021	"Clostridiota"	"Clostridiia"	"Oscillospirales"	Acutalibacteraceae	
"Ca. Gallacutalibacter"	Gilroy et al. 2021	"Clostridiota"	"Clostridiia"	"Oscillospirales"	Acutalibacteraceae	
Hominenteromicrobium	Afrizal et al. 2023	"Clostridiota"	"Clostridiia"	"Oscillospirales"	Acutalibacteraceae	
"Ca. Heritagella"	Glendinning et al. 2020	"Clostridiota"	"Clostridiia"	"Oscillospirales"	Acutalibacteraceae	
"Ca. Howiella"	Glendinning et al. 2020	"Clostridiota"	"Clostridiia"	"Oscillospirales"	Acutalibacteraceae	
Hydrogeniiclostridium	corrig. Chaplin et al. 2020	"Clostridiota"	"Clostridiia"	"Oscillospirales"	Acutalibacteraceae	
Ca. "Improbicoccus"	Takahashi et al. 2023	"Clostridiota"	"Clostridiia"	"Oscillospirales"	Acutalibacteraceae	
"Ca. Limimonas"	Gilroy et al. 2022 non Amoozegar et al. 2013	"Clostridiota"	"Clostridiia"	"Oscillospirales"	Acutalibacteraceae	
"Ca. Limousia"	Gilroy et al. 2021	"Clostridiota"	"Clostridiia"	"Oscillospirales"	Acutalibacteraceae	
"Ca. Onthovicinus"	Gilroy et al. 2021	"Clostridiota"	"Clostridiia"	"Oscillospirales"	Acutalibacteraceae	
"Ca. Paraimprobicoccus"	Takahashi et al. 2023	"Clostridiota"	"Clostridiia"	"Oscillospirales"	Acutalibacteraceae	
"Pseudoruminococcus"	Afouda et al. 2020 non Glendinning et al. 2020	"Clostridiota"	"Clostridiia"	"Oscillospirales"	Acutalibacteraceae	
"Ca. Scatavimonas"	Gilroy et al. 2021	"Clostridiota"	"Clostridiia"	"Oscillospirales"	Acutalibacteraceae	"Ca. Scatovicinus" Gilroy et al. 2021
"Scatolibacter"	Zgheib et al. 2021	"Clostridiota"	"Clostridiia"	"Oscillospirales"	Acutalibacteraceae	
"Ca. Scubalenecus"	Gilroy et al. 2021	"Clostridiota"	"Clostridiia"	"Oscillospirales"	Acutalibacteraceae	
"Ca. Scybalenecus"	Gilroy et al. 2021	"Clostridiota"	"Clostridiia"	"Oscillospirales"	Acutalibacteraceae	
Solibaculum	Sakamoto et al. 2021	"Clostridiota"	"Clostridiia"	"Oscillospirales"	Acutalibacteraceae	
"Ca. Timburyella"	Glendinning et al. 2020	"Clostridiota"	"Clostridiia"	"Oscillospirales"	Acutalibacteraceae	
"Yeguia"	Liu et al. 2021	"Clostridiota"	"Clostridiia"	"Oscillospirales"	Acutalibacteraceae	
"Ca. Apopatosoma"	Gilroy et al. 2022	"Clostridiota"	"Clostridiia"	"Oscillospirales"	"Avispirillaceae"	
"Ca. Avispirillum"	Glendinning et al. 2020	"Clostridiota"	"Clostridiia"	"Oscillospirales"	"Avispirillaceae"	
"Ca. Darwinibacterium"	Gilroy et al. 2022	"Clostridiota"	"Clostridiia"	"Oscillospirales"	"Avispirillaceae"	
"Ca. Flemingibacterium"	Glendinning et al. 2020	"Clostridiota"	"Clostridiia"	"Oscillospirales"	"Avispirillaceae"	
Agathobaculum	Ahn et al. 2016	"Clostridiota"	"Clostridiia"	"Oscillospirales"	Butyricicoccaceae	
Butyricicoccus	Eeckhaut et al. 2008	"Clostridiota"	"Clostridiia"	"Oscillospirales"	Butyricicoccaceae	
"Intestinibacillus"	Ricaboni et al. 2017	"Clostridiota"	"Clostridiia"	"Oscillospirales"	Butyricicoccaceae	
"Ca. Pseudobutyricicoccus"	Glendinning et al. 2020	"Clostridiota"	"Clostridiia"	"Oscillospirales"	Butyricicoccaceae	
"Ca. Ventrousia"	Gilroy et al. 2021	"Clostridiota"	"Clostridiia"	"Oscillospirales"	Butyricicoccaceae	
Ethanoligenens	Xing et al. 2006	"Clostridiota"	"Clostridiia"	"Oscillospirales"	Ethanoligenentaceae	"Ethanologenbacterium" Xing, Ren & Li 2004 nom. nud.
"Feifania"	Liu et al. 2021	"Clostridiota"	"Clostridiia"	"Oscillospirales"	"Feifaniaceae"	
"Ca. Galloscillospira"	Gilroy et al. 2021	"Clostridiota"	"Clostridiia"	"Oscillospirales"	"Feifaniaceae"	
"Ca. Geddesella"	Glendinning et al. 2020	"Clostridiota"	"Clostridiia"	"Oscillospirales"	"Geddesellaceae"	
Amygdalobacter	Srinivasan et al. 2023	"Clostridiota"	"Clostridiia"	"Oscillospirales"	Oscillospiraceae	
"Ca. Alloscillospira"	Glendinning et al. 2020	"Clostridiota"	"Clostridiia"	"Oscillospirales"	Oscillospiraceae	
"Ca. Apopatocola"	Gilroy et al. 2022	"Clostridiota"	"Clostridiia"	"Oscillospirales"	Oscillospiraceae	
"Ca. Avoscillospira"	Gilroy et al. 2021	"Clostridiota"	"Clostridiia"	"Oscillospirales"	Oscillospiraceae	
Bengtsoniella	Pardesi et al. 2024	"Clostridiota"	"Clostridiia"	"Oscillospirales"	Oscillospiraceae	
Drancourtella	Durand et al. 2023	"Clostridiota"	"Clostridiia"	"Oscillospirales"	Oscillospiraceae	
Dysosmobacter	Le Roy et al. 2020	"Clostridiota"	"Clostridiia"	"Oscillospirales"	Oscillospiraceae	"Pusillimonas" Kitahara et al. 2021 non Stolz et al. 2005; Pusillibacter Kitahara et al. 2022
"Ca. Enterenecus"	Gilroy et al. 2021	"Clostridiota"	"Clostridiia"	"Oscillospirales"	Oscillospiraceae	
"Evtepia"	Strandwitz et al. 2019	"Clostridiota"	"Clostridiia"	"Oscillospirales"	Oscillospiraceae	
"Faecousia"	Hitch et al. 2024 non Gilroy et al. 2021	"Clostridiota"	"Clostridiia"	"Oscillospirales"	Oscillospiraceae	
"Ca. Faecousia"	Gilroy et al. 2021 non Hitch et al. 2024	"Clostridiota"	"Clostridiia"	"Oscillospirales"	Oscillospiraceae	
Flavonifractor	Carlier et al. 2010	"Clostridiota"	"Clostridiia"	"Oscillospirales"	Oscillospiraceae	
Flintibacter	Lagkouvardos et al. 2016	"Clostridiota"	"Clostridiia"	"Oscillospirales"	Oscillospiraceae	
"Ca. Heteroscillospira"	corrig. Glendinning et al. 2020	"Clostridiota"	"Clostridiia"	"Oscillospirales"	Oscillospiraceae	
"Hominicola"	Hitch et al. 2024	"Clostridiota"	"Clostridiia"	"Oscillospirales"	Oscillospiraceae	
Hominicoprocola	Afrizal et al. 2023	"Clostridiota"	"Clostridiia"	"Oscillospirales"	Oscillospiraceae	
"Ca. Intestinicoccus"	Zhou et al. 2023	"Clostridiota"	"Clostridiia"	"Oscillospirales"	Oscillospiraceae	
Intestinimonas	Kläring et al. 2013	"Clostridiota"	"Clostridiia"	"Oscillospirales"	Oscillospiraceae	
"Jilunia"	Liu et al. 2021b	"Clostridiota"	"Clostridiia"	"Oscillospirales"	Oscillospiraceae	
"Jirenia"	Huang et al. 2024	"Clostridiota"	"Clostridiia"	"Oscillospirales"	Oscillospiraceae	
Lawsonibacter	Sakamoto et al. 2018	"Clostridiota"	"Clostridiia"	"Oscillospirales"	Oscillospiraceae	Muriventricola Hitch et al. 2022
"Ca. Limivicinus"	Gilroy et al. 2021	"Clostridiota"	"Clostridiia"	"Oscillospirales"	Oscillospiraceae	
"Marasmitruncus"	Pham et al. 2017	"Clostridiota"	"Clostridiia"	"Oscillospirales"	Oscillospiraceae	
"Markus"	Huang et al. 2024 non Fanti & Pankowski 2018	"Clostridiota"	"Clostridiia"	"Oscillospirales"	Oscillospiraceae	
"Mengyingia"	Huang et al. 2024	"Clostridiota"	"Clostridiia"	"Oscillospirales"	Oscillospiraceae	
Neglectibacter	Zgheib et al. 2024	"Clostridiota"	"Clostridiia"	"Oscillospirales"	Oscillospiraceae	Neglecta Bessis et al. 2016
Neopoerus	Selma-Royo et al. 2023	"Clostridiota"	"Clostridiia"	"Oscillospirales"	Oscillospiraceae	
"Ca. Onthomonas"	Gilroy et al. 2021	"Clostridiota"	"Clostridiia"	"Oscillospirales"	Oscillospiraceae	
Oscillibacter	Iino et al. 2007	"Clostridiota"	"Clostridiia"	"Oscillospirales"	Oscillospiraceae	
Oscillospira	Chatton & Pérard 1913	"Clostridiota"	"Clostridiia"	"Oscillospirales"	Oscillospiraceae	
Owariibacterium	Hamaguchi et al. 2025	"Clostridiota"	"Clostridiia"	"Oscillospirales"	Oscillospiraceae	
Paludihabitans	Deshmukh & Oren 2023	"Clostridiota"	"Clostridiia"	"Oscillospirales"	Oscillospiraceae	Paludicola Li et al. 2017 non Blasius 1857 non Hodgson 1837 non Necchi & Vis 2020 non Wagler 1830
Papillibacter	Defnoun et al. 2000	"Clostridiota"	"Clostridiia"	"Oscillospirales"	Oscillospiraceae	
"Ca. Pelethomonas"	Gilroy et al. 2021	"Clostridiota"	"Clostridiia"	"Oscillospirales"	Oscillospiraceae	
Pseudoflavonifractor	Carlier et al. 2010	"Clostridiota"	"Clostridiia"	"Oscillospirales"	Oscillospiraceae	
"Ca. Pseudoscillospira"	corrig. Glendinning et al. 2020	"Clostridiota"	"Clostridiia"	"Oscillospirales"	Oscillospiraceae	
Ruminococcoides	Molinero et al. 2021	"Clostridiota"	"Clostridiia"	"Oscillospirales"	Oscillospiraceae	
"Ca. Scatomorpha"	Gilroy et al. 2021	"Clostridiota"	"Clostridiia"	"Oscillospirales"	Oscillospiraceae	
"Shuzhengia"	Liu et al. 2021b	"Clostridiota"	"Clostridiia"	"Oscillospirales"	Oscillospiraceae	
Sporobacter	Grech-Mora et al. 1996	"Clostridiota"	"Clostridiia"	"Oscillospirales"	Oscillospiraceae	
"Vermiculatibacterium"	Afrizal et al. 2022	"Clostridiota"	"Clostridiia"	"Oscillospirales"	Oscillospiraceae	
Vescimonas	Kitahara et al. 2021	"Clostridiota"	"Clostridiia"	"Oscillospirales"	Oscillospiraceae	"Brotocaccenecus" Afrizal et al. 2022
"Ca. Vesiculincola"	Treitli et al. 2023	"Clostridiota"	"Clostridiia"	"Oscillospirales"	Oscillospiraceae	
Acetanaerobacterium	Chen & Dong 2004	"Clostridiota"	"Clostridiia"	"Oscillospirales"	Ruminococcaceae	
Allofournierella	Oren & Molinari Novoa 2024	"Clostridiota"	"Clostridiia"	"Oscillospirales"	Ruminococcaceae	Fournierella Togo et al. 2017 non Collignon 1966
"Ca. Alloruminococcus"	Glendinning et al. 2020	"Clostridiota"	"Clostridiia"	"Oscillospirales"	Ruminococcaceae	
Anaerofilum	Zellner et al. 1996	"Clostridiota"	"Clostridiia"	"Oscillospirales"	Ruminococcaceae	
Anaerotruncus	Lawson et al. 2004	"Clostridiota"	"Clostridiia"	"Oscillospirales"	Ruminococcaceae	
"Angelakisella"	Mailhe et al. 2017	"Clostridiota"	"Clostridiia"	"Oscillospirales"	Ruminococcaceae	
"Ca. Aristotella"	Glendinning et al. 2020	"Clostridiota"	"Clostridiia"	"Oscillospirales"	Ruminococcaceae	
"Ca. Avimicrobium"	Glendinning et al. 2020	"Clostridiota"	"Clostridiia"	"Oscillospirales"	Ruminococcaceae	
"Bittarella"	Durand et al. 2017 ex Liu et al. 2021	"Clostridiota"	"Clostridiia"	"Oscillospirales"	Ruminococcaceae	
"Ca. Egerieicola"	Gilroy et al. 2021	"Clostridiota"	"Clostridiia"	"Oscillospirales"	Ruminococcaceae	
Faecalibacterium	Duncan et al. 2002	"Clostridiota"	"Clostridiia"	"Oscillospirales"	Ruminococcaceae	
"Ca. Faeciplasma"	Gilroy et al. 2021	"Clostridiota"	"Clostridiia"	"Oscillospirales"	Ruminococcaceae	
"Ca. Faecivivens"	Gilroy et al. 2021	"Clostridiota"	"Clostridiia"	"Oscillospirales"	Ruminococcaceae	
"Ca. Falkowella"	Glendinning et al. 2020	"Clostridiota"	"Clostridiia"	"Oscillospirales"	Ruminococcaceae	
"Ca. Ferrisolea"	corrig. Pfleiderer et al. 2013	"Clostridiota"	"Clostridiia"	"Oscillospirales"	Ruminococcaceae	"Ca. Soleaferrea" Pfleiderer et al. 2013
"Ca. Fimivivens"	Gilroy et al. 2021	"Clostridiota"	"Clostridiia"	"Oscillospirales"	Ruminococcaceae	"Yanshouia" Liu et al. 2021b
Fumia	Liu et al. 2022	"Clostridiota"	"Clostridiia"	"Oscillospirales"	Ruminococcaceae	
Gemmiger	Gossling & Moore 1975	"Clostridiota"	"Clostridiia"	"Oscillospirales"	Ruminococcaceae	"Ca. Cibionibacter" corrig. Pasolli et al. 2019; Subdoligranulum Holmstrøm et al. 2004
Harryflintia	Petzoldt et al. 2016	"Clostridiota"	"Clostridiia"	"Oscillospirales"	Ruminococcaceae	"Provencibacterium" Traore et al. 2017
"Ca. Heteroruminococcus"	Glendinning et al. 2020	"Clostridiota"	"Clostridiia"	"Oscillospirales"	Ruminococcaceae	
Hominimerdicola	Hitch et al. 2022	"Clostridiota"	"Clostridiia"	"Oscillospirales"	Ruminococcaceae	
Huintestinicola	Hitch et al. 2022	"Clostridiota"	"Clostridiia"	"Oscillospirales"	Ruminococcaceae	
Hydrogenoanaerobacterium	Song & Dong 2009	"Clostridiota"	"Clostridiia"	"Oscillospirales"	Ruminococcaceae	
Ligaoa	Liu et al. 2022	"Clostridiota"	"Clostridiia"	"Oscillospirales"	Ruminococcaceae	
Massiliimalia	Afouda et al. 2019	"Clostridiota"	"Clostridiia"	"Oscillospirales"	Ruminococcaceae	"Massilimaliae" Traore et al. 2017
"Massilioclostridium"	Lo et al. 2017	"Clostridiota"	"Clostridiia"	"Oscillospirales"	Ruminococcaceae	
Merdimmobilis	Abdugheni et al. 2023	"Clostridiota"	"Clostridiia"	"Oscillospirales"	Ruminococcaceae	
"Ca. Merdivicinus"	Gilroy et al. 2021	"Clostridiota"	"Clostridiia"	"Oscillospirales"	Ruminococcaceae	
"Ca. Metaruminococcus"	Glendinning et al. 2020	"Clostridiota"	"Clostridiia"	"Oscillospirales"	Ruminococcaceae	
Negativibacillus	Valles et al. 2021	"Clostridiota"	"Clostridiia"	"Oscillospirales"	Ruminococcaceae	
"Neobittarella"	Bilen et al. 2018b	"Clostridiota"	"Clostridiia"	"Oscillospirales"	Ruminococcaceae	
"Ca. Neoruminococcus"	Glendinning et al. 2020	"Clostridiota"	"Clostridiia"	"Oscillospirales"	Ruminococcaceae	
Phocea	Ndongo et al. 2016	"Clostridiota"	"Clostridiia"	"Oscillospirales"	Ruminococcaceae	
Porcipelethomonas	Hitch et al. 2025	"Clostridiota"	"Clostridiia"	"Oscillospirales"	Ruminococcaceae	
"Pygmaiobacter"	Bilen et al. 2017	"Clostridiota"	"Clostridiia"	"Oscillospirales"	Ruminococcaceae	
Ruminococcus	Sijpesteijn 1948	"Clostridiota"	"Clostridiia"	"Oscillospirales"	Ruminococcaceae	
Ruthenibacterium	Shkoporov et al. 2016	"Clostridiota"	"Clostridiia"	"Oscillospirales"	Ruminococcaceae	
"Ca. Schneewindia"	Glendinning et al. 2020	"Clostridiota"	"Clostridiia"	"Oscillospirales"	Ruminococcaceae	
Youxingia	Liu et al. 2022	"Clostridiota"	"Clostridiia"	"Oscillospirales"	Ruminococcaceae	
Zongyangia	Liu et al. 2022	"Clostridiota"	"Clostridiia"	"Oscillospirales"	Ruminococcaceae	"Ca. Pararuminococcus" Glendinning et al. 2020
"Ca. Tabaqchalia"	Glendinning et al. 2020	"Clostridiota"	"Clostridiia"	"Oscillospirales"	"Tabaqchaliaceae"	
"Ca. Coliplasma"	Gilroy et al. 2022	"Clostridiota"	"Clostridiia"	"Oscillospirales"	"Woodwardibiaceae"	
"Ca. Woodwardiibium"	corrig. Glendinning et al. 2020	"Clostridiota"	"Clostridiia"	"Oscillospirales"	"Woodwardibiaceae"	
Guggenheimella	Wyss et al. 2005	"Clostridiota"	"Clostridiia"	Peptostreptococcales		
Acidaminobacter	Stams & Hansen 1985	"Clostridiota"	"Clostridiia"	Peptostreptococcales	Acidaminobacteraceae	
Fusibacter	Ravot et al. 1999	"Clostridiota"	"Clostridiia"	Peptostreptococcales	Acidaminobacteraceae	
"Helicovermis"	Miyazaki et al. 2024	"Clostridiota"	"Clostridiia"	Peptostreptococcales	Acidaminobacteraceae	
"Alangreenwoodia"	Glendinning et al. 2020	"Clostridiota"	"Clostridiia"	Peptostreptococcales	Anaerovoracaceae	
"Alterileibacterium"	Boxberger, Anani & La Scola 2019	"Clostridiota"	"Clostridiia"	Peptostreptococcales	Anaerovoracaceae	"Ileibacterium" Mailhe et al. 2017 non Cox et al. 2017
Aminicella	Ueki et al. 2015	"Clostridiota"	"Clostridiia"	Peptostreptococcales	Anaerovoracaceae	
Aminipila	Ueki et al. 2018	"Clostridiota"	"Clostridiia"	Peptostreptococcales	Anaerovoracaceae	
Anaerovorax	Matthies et al. 2000	"Clostridiota"	"Clostridiia"	Peptostreptococcales	Anaerovoracaceae	
Anoxybacterium	Cao et al. 2025	"Clostridiota"	"Clostridiia"	Peptostreptococcales	Anaerovoracaceae	
"Ca. Avanaerovorax"	Gilroy et al. 2021	"Clostridiota"	"Clostridiia"	Peptostreptococcales	Anaerovoracaceae	
"Bacilliculturomica"	Traore et al. 2017	"Clostridiota"	"Clostridiia"	Peptostreptococcales	Anaerovoracaceae	
Baileyella	Wylensek et al. 2021	"Clostridiota"	"Clostridiia"	Peptostreptococcales	Anaerovoracaceae	"Mobilibacterium" Bilen et al. 2017
"Ca. Colimonas"	Gilroy et al. 2022	"Clostridiota"	"Clostridiia"	Peptostreptococcales	Anaerovoracaceae	
"Ca. Crickella"	Gilroy et al. 2022	"Clostridiota"	"Clostridiia"	Peptostreptococcales	Anaerovoracaceae	
"Emergencia"	Bessis et al. 2016	"Clostridiota"	"Clostridiia"	Peptostreptococcales	Anaerovoracaceae	"Senimuribacter" Afrizal et al. 2022
"Ca. Fimisoma"	Gilroy et al. 2021	"Clostridiota"	"Clostridiia"	Peptostreptococcales	Anaerovoracaceae	
Gallibacter	Zenner et al. 2021	"Clostridiota"	"Clostridiia"	Peptostreptococcales	Anaerovoracaceae	
Hominibacterium	Borhanudin et al. 2024	"Clostridiota"	"Clostridiia"	Peptostreptococcales	Anaerovoracaceae	"Ihubacter" Ndongo et al. 2016; "Zhenpiania" Liu et al. 2021
Hornefia	Wylensek et al. 2021	"Clostridiota"	"Clostridiia"	Peptostreptococcales	Anaerovoracaceae	
Lentihominibacter	Liu et al. 2022	"Clostridiota"	"Clostridiia"	Peptostreptococcales	Anaerovoracaceae	"Ca. Allocopromorpha" corrig. Gilroy et al. 2021; Brotomerdimonas Hitch et al. 2025; "Ca. Copromorpha" Gilroy et al. 2021 non Meyrick 1886
Mogibacterium	Nakazawa et al. 2000	"Clostridiota"	"Clostridiia"	Peptostreptococcales	Anaerovoracaceae	
"Sinanaerobacter"	Bao et al. 2021	"Clostridiota"	"Clostridiia"	Peptostreptococcales	Anaerovoracaceae	
Caminicella	Alain et al. 2002	"Clostridiota"	"Clostridiia"	Peptostreptococcales	Caminicellaceae	
Maledivibacter	Li et al. 2016	"Clostridiota"	"Clostridiia"	Peptostreptococcales	Caminicellaceae	
Paramaledivibacter	Li et al. 2016	"Clostridiota"	"Clostridiia"	Peptostreptococcales	Caminicellaceae	
"Ca. Petromonas"	Christman et al. 2020	"Clostridiota"	"Clostridiia"	Peptostreptococcales	Caminicellaceae	
Wukongibacter	Li et al. 2016	"Clostridiota"	"Clostridiia"	Peptostreptococcales	Caminicellaceae	
Acetoanaerobium	Sleat, Mah & Robinson 1985	"Clostridiota"	"Clostridiia"	Peptostreptococcales	Filifactoraceae	
Criibacterium	Maheux et al. 2021	"Clostridiota"	"Clostridiia"	Peptostreptococcales	Filifactoraceae	
Filifactor	Collins et al. 1994	"Clostridiota"	"Clostridiia"	Peptostreptococcales	Filifactoraceae	
Peptoanaerobacter	Sizova et al. 2016	"Clostridiota"	"Clostridiia"	Peptostreptococcales	Filifactoraceae	
Proteocatella	Pikuta et al. 2009	"Clostridiota"	"Clostridiia"	Peptostreptococcales	Filifactoraceae	
Isachenkonia	Zhilina, Zavarzina & Kublanov 2020	"Clostridiota"	"Clostridiia"	Peptostreptococcales	"Isachenkoniaceae"	
Alkaliphilus	Takai et al. 2001	"Clostridiota"	"Clostridiia"	Peptostreptococcales	Natronincolaceae	
Anaerovirgula	Pikuta et al. 2006	"Clostridiota"	"Clostridiia"	Peptostreptococcales	Natronincolaceae	
Natronincola	Zhilina et al. 1999	"Clostridiota"	"Clostridiia"	Peptostreptococcales	Natronincolaceae	
Serpentinicella	Mei et al. 2016	"Clostridiota"	"Clostridiia"	Peptostreptococcales	Natronincolaceae	
Alkalithermobacter	Bello et al. 2024	"Clostridiota"	"Clostridiia"	Peptostreptococcales	Peptostreptococcaceae	
Asaccharospora	Gerritsen et al. 2014	"Clostridiota"	"Clostridiia"	Peptostreptococcales	Peptostreptococcaceae	
Clostridioides	Lawson et al. 2016	"Clostridiota"	"Clostridiia"	Peptostreptococcales	Peptostreptococcaceae	"Peptoclostridium" Yutin & Galperin 2013 non Galperin et al. 2016 non Donker 1926
Faecalimicrobium	Bello et al. 2024	"Clostridiota"	"Clostridiia"	Peptostreptococcales	Peptostreptococcaceae	
Intestinibacter	Gerritsen et al. 2014	"Clostridiota"	"Clostridiia"	Peptostreptococcales	Peptostreptococcaceae	
Metaclostridioides	Bello et al. 2024	"Clostridiota"	"Clostridiia"	Peptostreptococcales	Peptostreptococcaceae	
Paraclostridium	Sasi Jyothsna et al. 2016	"Clostridiota"	"Clostridiia"	Peptostreptococcales	Peptostreptococcaceae	"Martellillus" Heller 1922; Paeniclostridium Sasi Jyothsna et al. 2016
Peptacetobacter	Chen et al. 2020	"Clostridiota"	"Clostridiia"	Peptostreptococcales	Peptostreptococcaceae	
Peptoclostridium	Galperin et al. 2016 non Donker 1926 non Yutin & Galperin 2013	"Clostridiota"	"Clostridiia"	Peptostreptococcales	Peptostreptococcaceae	
Peptostreptococcus	Kluyver & van Niel 1936	"Clostridiota"	"Clostridiia"	Peptostreptococcales	Peptostreptococcaceae	"Peptodiplococcus" Ter-Kazar’yan 1975
Romboutsia	Gerritsen et al. 2014	"Clostridiota"	"Clostridiia"	Peptostreptococcales	Peptostreptococcaceae	
Sporacetigenium	Chen, Song & Dong 2006	"Clostridiota"	"Clostridiia"	Peptostreptococcales	Peptostreptococcaceae	
Tepidibacter	Slobodkin et al. 2003	"Clostridiota"	"Clostridiia"	Peptostreptococcales	Peptostreptococcaceae	
Terrisporobacter	Gerritsen et al. 2014	"Clostridiota"	"Clostridiia"	Peptostreptococcales	Peptostreptococcaceae	
Anaeromicrobium	Zhang et al. 2017	"Clostridiota"	"Clostridiia"	Peptostreptococcales	Thermotaleaceae	
Anaerosolibacter	Hong et al. 2015	"Clostridiota"	"Clostridiia"	Peptostreptococcales	Thermotaleaceae	
Crassaminicella	Lakhal et al. 2015	"Clostridiota"	"Clostridiia"	Peptostreptococcales	Thermotaleaceae	
Geosporobacter	Klouche et al. 2007	"Clostridiota"	"Clostridiia"	Peptostreptococcales	Thermotaleaceae	
"Inediibacterium"	Alou et al. 2017	"Clostridiota"	"Clostridiia"	Peptostreptococcales	Thermotaleaceae	"Anaerophilus" Zhang et al. 2020
Marinisporobacter	Vandieken et al. 2017	"Clostridiota"	"Clostridiia"	Peptostreptococcales	Thermotaleaceae	
Salimesophilobacter	Zhang et al. 2013	"Clostridiota"	"Clostridiia"	Peptostreptococcales	Thermotaleaceae	
Thermotalea	Ogg & Patel 2009	"Clostridiota"	"Clostridiia"	Peptostreptococcales	Thermotaleaceae	
Anoxynatronum	Garnova & Zhilina 2003	"Clostridiota"	"Clostridiia"	Peptostreptococcales	Tindalliaceae	
Tindallia	Kevbrin et al. 1999	"Clostridiota"	"Clostridiia"	Peptostreptococcales	Tindalliaceae	
Petroclostridium	Zhang et al. 2018b	"Clostridiota"	"Clostridiia"	"Petroclostridiales"	"Petroclostridiaceae"	
Fastidiosipila	Falsen et al. 2005	"Clostridiota"	"Clostridiia"	"Saccharofermentanales"	Fastidiosipilaceae	
Mageeibacillus	Austin et al. 2016	"Clostridiota"	"Clostridiia"	"Saccharofermentanales"	Fastidiosipilaceae	
Ercella	van Gelder et al. 2014	"Clostridiota"	"Clostridiia"	"Saccharofermentanales"	"Saccharofermentanaceae"	
Saccharofermentans	Chen, Niu & Zhang 2010	"Clostridiota"	"Clostridiia"	"Saccharofermentanales"	"Saccharofermentanaceae"	
"Ca. Scatonaster"	Gilroy et al. 2022	"Clostridiota"	"Clostridiia"	"Saccharofermentanales"	"Saccharofermentanaceae"	
Abyssisolibacter	Kim, Lee & Kwon 2024	"Clostridiota"	"Clostridiia"	Tissierellales	"Abyssisolibacteraceae"	
Acidilutibacter	Fan et al. 2023	"Clostridiota"	"Clostridiia"	Tissierellales	Acidilutibacteraceae	
Caldisalinibacter	Ben Hania et al. 2015	"Clostridiota"	"Clostridiia"	Tissierellales	Caldisalinibacteraceae	
Clostridiisalibacter	Liebgott et al. 2008	"Clostridiota"	"Clostridiia"	Tissierellales	Clostridiisalibacteraceae	
Dethiosulfatibacter	Takii et al. 2007	"Clostridiota"	"Clostridiia"	Tissierellales	Dethiosulfatibacteraceae	
Andreesenia	Poehlein et al. 2017c	"Clostridiota"	"Clostridiia"	Tissierellales	Gottschalkiaceae	
Gottschalkia	Poehlein et al. 2017	"Clostridiota"	"Clostridiia"	Tissierellales	Gottschalkiaceae	
Aedoeadaptatus	Hitch et al. 2022	"Clostridiota"	"Clostridiia"	Tissierellales	Peptoniphilaceae	
Anaerococcus	Ezaki et al. 2001	"Clostridiota"	"Clostridiia"	Tissierellales	Peptoniphilaceae	"Casaltella" La Scola, Fournier & Raoult 2011
Citroniella	Patel et al. 2019	"Clostridiota"	"Clostridiia"	Tissierellales	Peptoniphilaceae	
Ezakiella	Patel et al. 2015	"Clostridiota"	"Clostridiia"	Tissierellales	Peptoniphilaceae	
Fenollaria	Pagnier et al. 2018	"Clostridiota"	"Clostridiia"	Tissierellales	Peptoniphilaceae	
Finegoldia	Murdoch & Shah 2000	"Clostridiota"	"Clostridiia"	Tissierellales	Peptoniphilaceae	
Gallicola	Ezaki et al. 2001	"Clostridiota"	"Clostridiia"	Tissierellales	Peptoniphilaceae	
Helcococcus	Collins et al. 1993	"Clostridiota"	"Clostridiia"	Tissierellales	Peptoniphilaceae	
Kallipyga	Hugon et al. 2016	"Clostridiota"	"Clostridiia"	Tissierellales	Peptoniphilaceae	
"Khoudiadiopia"	Diop et al. 2017	"Clostridiota"	"Clostridiia"	Tissierellales	Peptoniphilaceae	Massiliomicrobiota Ndongo et al. 2016
Levyella	La Scola, Fournier & Raoult 2011	"Clostridiota"	"Clostridiia"	Tissierellales	Peptoniphilaceae	
Mediannikoviicoccus	Ly et al. 2023	"Clostridiota"	"Clostridiia"	Tissierellales	Peptoniphilaceae	"Lagierella" Traore et al. 2016
Miniphocaeibacter	corrig. Bilen et al. 2021	"Clostridiota"	"Clostridiia"	Tissierellales	Peptoniphilaceae	
Murdochiella	Ulger-Toprak et al. 2010	"Clostridiota"	"Clostridiia"	Tissierellales	Peptoniphilaceae	
"Ndongobacter"	Brahimi et al. 2017	"Clostridiota"	"Clostridiia"	Tissierellales	Peptoniphilaceae	
"Neofamilia"	Lagier et al. 2016	"Clostridiota"	"Clostridiia"	Tissierellales	Peptoniphilaceae	
Parvimonas	Tindall & Euzéby 2006	"Clostridiota"	"Clostridiia"	Tissierellales	Peptoniphilaceae	Micromonas Murdoch & Shah 2000 non Manton & Parke 1960
Peptoniphilus	Ezaki et al. 2001	"Clostridiota"	"Clostridiia"	Tissierellales	Peptoniphilaceae	Anaerosphaera Ueki et al. 2009; "Schleiferella" Rajendram et al. 2001
"Urinicoccus"	Yimagou et al. 2019	"Clostridiota"	"Clostridiia"	Tissierellales	Peptoniphilaceae	
Proteiniborus	Niu, Song & Dong 2008	"Clostridiota"	"Clostridiia"	Tissierellales	Proteiniboraceae	
Anaeromonas	Zhang et al. 2022	"Clostridiota"	"Clostridiia"	Tissierellales	"Senegaliaceae"	"Senegalia" Traore et al. 2016 non Rafinesque 1838
Sedimentibacter	Breitenstein et al. 2002	"Clostridiota"	"Clostridiia"	Tissierellales	Sedimentibacteraceae	
Anaerosalibacter	Rezgui et al. 2012	"Clostridiota"	"Clostridiia"	Tissierellales	Sporanaerobacteraceae	
Sporanaerobacter	Hernandez-Eugenio et al. 2002	"Clostridiota"	"Clostridiia"	Tissierellales	Sporanaerobacteraceae	
Sporosalibacterium	Rezgui et al. 2011	"Clostridiota"	"Clostridiia"	Tissierellales	"Sporosalibacteriaceae"	
Keratinibaculum	Huang et al. 2015	"Clostridiota"	"Clostridiia"	Tissierellales	Tepidimicrobiaceae	
Schnuerera	Lawson 2020	"Clostridiota"	"Clostridiia"	Tissierellales	Tepidimicrobiaceae	
Tepidimicrobium	Slobodkin et al. 2006	"Clostridiota"	"Clostridiia"	Tissierellales	Tepidimicrobiaceae	
Brassicibacter	Fang et al. 2012	"Clostridiota"	"Clostridiia"	Tissierellales	Thermohalobacteraceae	
Caloranaerobacter	Wery et al. 2001	"Clostridiota"	"Clostridiia"	Tissierellales	Thermohalobacteraceae	
Thermohalobacter	Cayol et al. 2000	"Clostridiota"	"Clostridiia"	Tissierellales	Thermohalobacteraceae	
Gudongella	Wu et al. 2020	"Clostridiota"	"Clostridiia"	Tissierellales	Tissierellaceae	
"Paratissierella"	Liu et al. 2021b	"Clostridiota"	"Clostridiia"	Tissierellales	Tissierellaceae	
Soehngenia	Parshina et al. 2003	"Clostridiota"	"Clostridiia"	Tissierellales	Tissierellaceae	
Tissierella	Collins & Shah 1986	"Clostridiota"	"Clostridiia"	Tissierellales	Tissierellaceae	"Urmitella" Pham et al. 2017
Caldicellulosiruptor	Rainey et al. 1995	"Clostridiota"	"Thermoanaerobacteria"	Caldicellulosiruptorales	Caldicellulosiruptoraceae	"Anaerocellum" Svetlichnyi et al. 1990; "Caldocellum" Sissons et al. 1987
Caloribacterium	Slobodkina et al. 2012	"Clostridiota"	"Thermoanaerobacteria"	Thermoanaerobacterales	"Calorimonadaceae"	
Calorimonas	Khomyakova et al. 2020	"Clostridiota"	"Thermoanaerobacteria"	Thermoanaerobacterales	"Calorimonadaceae"	
Caldanaerobius	Lee et al. 2008	"Clostridiota"	"Thermoanaerobacteria"	Thermoanaerobacterales	Caldanaerobiaceae	
Aceticella	Frolov et al. 2024	"Clostridiota"	"Thermoanaerobacteria"	Thermoanaerobacterales	Thermoanaerobacteraceae	
Caldanaerobacter	Fardeau et al. 2004	"Clostridiota"	"Thermoanaerobacteria"	Thermoanaerobacterales	Thermoanaerobacteraceae	Carboxydibrachium corrig. Sokolova et al. 2001
Thermoanaerobacter	Wiegel & Ljungdahl 1982	"Clostridiota"	"Thermoanaerobacteria"	Thermoanaerobacterales	Thermoanaerobacteraceae	Acetogenium Leigh & Wolfe 1983; Thermoanaerobium Zeikus, Hegge & Anderson 1983; Thermobacteroides Ben-Bassat & Zeikus 1983
Thermoanaerobacterium	Lee et al. 1993	"Clostridiota"	"Thermoanaerobacteria"	Thermoanaerobacterales	Thermoanaerobacteraceae	Thermohydrogenium Zacharova et al. 1996
Koleobacter	Sakamoto et al. 2021	"Clostridiota"	Thermosediminibacteria	Koleobacterales	Koleobacteraceae	
Biomaibacter	Zhang et al. 2019	"Clostridiota"	Thermosediminibacteria	Thermosediminibacterales	Tepidanaerobacteraceae	
Tepidanaerobacter	Sekiguchi et al. 2006	"Clostridiota"	Thermosediminibacteria	Thermosediminibacterales	Tepidanaerobacteraceae	
Thermorhabdus	Xu et al. 2025	"Clostridiota"	Thermosediminibacteria	Thermosediminibacterales	Tepidanaerobacteraceae	
Fervidicola	Ogg & Patel 2009	"Clostridiota"	Thermosediminibacteria	Thermosediminibacterales	Thermosediminibacteraceae	Caldanaerovirga Wagner et al. 2009; Thermovorax Makinen, Kaksonen & Puhakka 2012
Thermosediminibacter	Lee et al. 2006	"Clostridiota"	Thermosediminibacteria	Thermosediminibacterales	Thermosediminibacteraceae	
Thermovenabulum	Zavarzina et al. 2002	"Clostridiota"	Thermosediminibacteria	Thermosediminibacterales	Thermosediminibacteraceae	
"Ca. Contubernalis"	corrig. Zhilina et al. 2005	Bacillota_D	Dethiobacteria	SKNC01	SKNC01	
Dethiobacter	Sorokin et al. 2008	Bacillota_D	Dethiobacteria	Dethiobacterales	Dethiobacteraceae	
Natranaerobaculum	Zavarzina et al. 2013	Bacillota_D	Natranaerobiia	Natranaerobiales	Natranaerobiaceae	
Natranaerobius	Mesbah et al. 2007	Bacillota_D	Natranaerobiia	Natranaerobiales	Natranaerobiaceae	
"Natronoanaerobium"	(sic) Owenson 1997 ex Jones et al. 1998	Bacillota_D	Natranaerobiia	Natranaerobiales	Natranaerobiaceae	
Natronovirga	Mesbah & Wiegel 2009	Bacillota_D	Natranaerobiia	Natranaerobiales	Natranaerobiaceae	
Natranaerofaba	Sorokin et al. 2021	Bacillota_D	Natranaerobiia	Natranaerobiales	Natranaerofabaceae	
Alkalicella	Quemeneur et al. 2021	Bacillota_D	"Proteinivoracia"	"Proteinivoracales"	Proteinivoracaceae	
Anaerobranca	Engle et al. 1995	Bacillota_D	"Proteinivoracia"	"Proteinivoracales"	Proteinivoracaceae	
Proteinivorax	Kevbrin et al. 2014	Bacillota_D	"Proteinivoracia"	"Proteinivoracales"	Proteinivoracaceae	
"Ca. Acetocimmeria"	Smith et al. 2021	Bacillota_E	Sulfobacillia	UBA3575	UBA3575	
"Ca. Fermentithermobacillus"	Kadnikov et al. 2023	Bacillota_E	Sulfobacillia	"Fermentithermobacillales"	"Fermentithermobacillaceae"	
"Ca. Hydrogenisulfobacillus"	Hogendoorn et al. 2023	Bacillota_E	Sulfobacillia	Sulfobacilliales	R501	
Sulfobacillus	Golovacheva & Karavaiko 1991	Bacillota_E	Sulfobacillia	Sulfobacillales	"Sulfobacillaceae"	
"Ca. Alkanivorans"	Wu et al. 2022	Bacillota_E	Sulfobacillia	Symbiobacteriales		
"Caldinitratiruptor"	Fardeau et al. 2010	Bacillota_E	Sulfobacillia	Symbiobacteriales	ZC4RG38	
Symbiobacterium	Ohno et al. 2000	Bacillota_E	Sulfobacillia	Symbiobacteriales	Symbiobacteriaceae	
"Thermalkanevorax"	Wen et al. 2026	Bacillota_E	Sulfobacillia	Symbiobacteriales	Symbiobacteriaceae	
Thermaerobacter	Takai, Inoue & Horikoshi 1999	Bacillota_E	Sulfobacillia	Thermaerobacterales	Thermaerobacteraceae	
Capillibacterium	Ungkulpasvich et al. 2021	Bacillota_G	"Hydrogenisporia"	"Capillibacteriales"	"Capillibacteriaceae"	
Hydrogenispora	Liu et al. 2014	Bacillota_G	"Hydrogenisporia"	"Hydrogenisporales"	"Hydrogenisporaceae"	
"Ca. Darwinibacter"	Puchol-Royo et al. 2023	Bacillota_G	Limnochordia	"Darwinibacterales"	"Darwinibacteraceae"	
"Ca. Thermodarwinisyntropha"	Cheng, Bongcam-Rudloff & Schnurer 2025	Bacillota_G	Limnochordia	"Darwinibacterales"	"Darwinibacteraceae"	
"Ca. Thermotepidanaerobacter"	Cheng, Bongcam-Rudloff & Schnurer 2025	Bacillota_G	Limnochordia	"Darwinibacterales"	"Darwinibacteraceae"	
"Ca. Wallacebacter"	Puchol-Royo et al. 2023	Bacillota_G	Limnochordia	"Darwinibacterales"	"Wallacebacteraceae"	
Allogeochorda	Kostovski & Oren 2026	Bacillota_G	Limnochordia	Limnochordales	Allogeochordaceae	Geochorda Karnachuk et al. 2025 non Chamisso & Schlechtendal 1828
"Carboxydichorda"	corrig. Karnachuk et al. 2024	Bacillota_G	Limnochordia	Limnochordales	Allogeochordaceae	
Limnochorda	Watanabe, Kojima & Fukui 2015	Bacillota_G	Limnochordia	Limnochordales	Limnochordaceae	
"Trigonala"	Zhang et al. 2006	Bacillota	"Bacillia"			
"Ca. Lumbricoplasma"	Nechitaylo et al. 2009	Bacillota	"Bacillia"		"Lumbricoplasmataceae"	
"Ca. Microaerobacter"	Khelifi et al. 2011	Bacillota	"Bacillia"	DSM-22679	DSM-22679	
Aureibacillus	Liu et al. 2015	Bacillota	"Bacillia"	DSM-28697	Aureibacillaceae	
Litoribacterium	Mahmoud et al. 2021	Bacillota	"Bacillia"	DSM-28697	Aureibacillaceae	
"Ca. Caccosoma"	Gilroy et al. 2021	Bacillota	"Bacillia"	RFN20	"Caccosomataceae"	
"Ca. Alectryobacillus"	Gilroy et al. 2021	Bacillota	"Bacillia"	RFN20	"Enteromonadaceae"	
"Ca. Alloenteromonas"	corrig. Gilroy et al. 2021	Bacillota	"Bacillia"	RFN20	"Enteromonadaceae"	"Ca. Enteromonas" Gilroy et al. 2021 non da Fonseca 1915
"Ca. Fiminaster"	Gilroy et al. 2022	Bacillota	"Bacillia"	RFN20	"Enteromonadaceae"	
"Ca. Onthovivens"	Gilroy et al. 2021	Bacillota	"Bacillia"	RFN20	"Enteromonadaceae"	
"Ca. Enterosoma"	Gilroy et al. 2021	Bacillota	"Bacillia"	RFN20	"Enterosomataceae"	
"Ca. Scatoplasma"	Gilroy et al. 2021	Bacillota	"Bacillia"	RFN20	"Enterosomataceae"	
Paracholeplasma	Watanabe et al. 2021	Bacillota	"Bacillia"	Acholeplasmatales	UBA5453	
Acholeplasma	Edward & Freundt 1970	Bacillota	"Bacillia"	Acholeplasmatales	Acholeplasmataceae	"Sapromyces" Sabin 1941 non Fritsch 1893
Alteracholeplasma	Watanabe et al. 2021	Bacillota	"Bacillia"	Acholeplasmatales	Acholeplasmataceae	
Haploplasma	Watanabe et al. 2021	Bacillota	"Bacillia"	Acholeplasmatales	Acholeplasmataceae	
Mariniplasma	Watanabe et al. 2021	Bacillota	"Bacillia"	Acholeplasmatales	Acholeplasmataceae	"Ca. Mariniplasma" corrig. Mortzfeld et al. 2016
"Peloplasma"	Khomyakova et al. 2024	Bacillota	"Bacillia"	Acholeplasmatales	Acholeplasmataceae	
"Ca. Phytoplasma"	Firrao et al. 2004	Bacillota	"Bacillia"	Acholeplasmatales	Acholeplasmataceae	plant yellows agents
"Pluraplasma"	corrig Skripal & Yegorov 2007	Bacillota	"Bacillia"	Acholeplasmatales	Acholeplasmataceae	
Anaeroplasma	Robinson, Allison & Hartman 1975	Bacillota	"Bacillia"	Acholeplasmatales	Anaeroplasmataceae	"Ca. Avacholeplasma" Gilroy et al. 2021
Asteroleplasma	Robinson & Freundt 1987	Bacillota	"Bacillia"	Acholeplasmatales	Anaeroplasmataceae	
"Ca. Pelethenecus"	Gilroy et al. 2021	Bacillota	"Bacillia"	Acholeplasmatales	Anaeroplasmataceae	
Alicyclobacillus	Wisotzkey et al. 1992	Bacillota	"Bacillia"	Alicyclobacillales	Alicyclobacillaceae	
"Fodinisporobacter"	Jiang et al. 2024	Bacillota	"Bacillia"	Alicyclobacillales	Alicyclobacillaceae	
Ferroacidibacillus	Johnson et al. 2023	Bacillota	"Bacillia"	Alicyclobacillales	Sulfoacidibacillaceae	"Acidibacillus" Holanda et al. 2015
Sulfoacidibacillus	Johnson et al. 2023	Bacillota	"Bacillia"	Alicyclobacillales	Sulfoacidibacillaceae	
Ammoniphilus	Zaitsev et al. 1998	Bacillota	"Bacillia"	Aneurinibacillales	"Ammoniphilaceae"	
Aneurinibacillus	Shida et al. 1996	Bacillota	"Bacillia"	Aneurinibacillales	Aneurinibacillaceae	
Oxalophagus	Collins et al. 1994	Bacillota	"Bacillia"	Aneurinibacillales	Aneurinibacillaceae	
"Ca. Alloscybalousia"	Gilroy et al. 2024	Bacillota	"Bacillia"	"Aphodocolales"	"Aphodocolaceae"	"Ca. Scybalousia" Gilroy et al. 2021 non Gilroy et al. 2022
"Ca. Aphodocola"	Gilroy et al. 2021	Bacillota	"Bacillia"	"Aphodocolales"	"Aphodocolaceae"	
"Ca. Caccenecus"	Gilroy et al. 2021	Bacillota	"Bacillia"	"Aphodocolales"	"Aphodocolaceae"	
"Ca. Coprosoma"	Gilroy et al. 2021	Bacillota	"Bacillia"	"Aphodocolales"	"Aphodocolaceae"	
"Ca. Coprovivens"	Gilroy et al. 2021	Bacillota	"Bacillia"	"Aphodocolales"	"Aphodocolaceae"	
"Ca. Faecenecus"	Gilroy et al. 2021	Bacillota	"Bacillia"	"Aphodocolales"	"Aphodocolaceae"	
"Ca. Faecimonas"	Gilroy et al. 2021 non Liu et al. 2020	Bacillota	"Bacillia"	"Aphodocolales"	"Aphodocolaceae"	
"Faecimonas"	Liu et al. 2020 non Gilroy et al. 2021	Bacillota	"Bacillia"	"Aphodocolales"	"Aphodocolaceae"	
"Ca. Faecisoma"	Gilroy et al. 2021	Bacillota	"Bacillia"	"Aphodocolales"	"Aphodocolaceae"	
"Ca. Fimihabitans"	Gilroy et al. 2021	Bacillota	"Bacillia"	"Aphodocolales"	"Aphodocolaceae"	
"Ca. Onthousia"	Gilroy et al. 2021	Bacillota	"Bacillia"	"Aphodocolales"	"Aphodocolaceae"	
"Ca. Pelethosoma"	Gilroy et al. 2021	Bacillota	"Bacillia"	"Aphodocolales"	"Aphodocolaceae"	
"Ca. Scybalousia"	Gilroy et al. 2021	Bacillota	"Bacillia"	"Aphodocolales"	"Aphodocolaceae"	
"Ca. Ventrenecus"	Gilroy et al. 2021	Bacillota	"Bacillia"	"Aphodocolales"	"Aphodocolaceae"	
Bhargavaea	Manorama et al. 2009	Bacillota	"Bacillia"	Bacillales_A	Planococcaceae	
Caryophanon	Peshkoff 1939	Bacillota	"Bacillia"	Bacillales_A	Planococcaceae	
Chryseomicrobium	Arora et al. 2011	Bacillota	"Bacillia"	Bacillales_A	Planococcaceae	"Tetzosporium" Tetz & Tetz 2018
"Crocinobacterium"	Lee 2006	Bacillota	"Bacillia"	Bacillales_A	Planococcaceae	
"Edaphobacillus"	Lal et al. 2013	Bacillota	"Bacillia"	Bacillales_A	Planococcaceae	
Indiicoccus	Pal et al. 2019	Bacillota	"Bacillia"	Bacillales_A	Planococcaceae	
Kurthia	(Kurth 1883) Trevisan 1885	Bacillota	"Bacillia"	Bacillales_A	Planococcaceae	"Zopfius" Wenner & Rettger 1919
Lysinibacillus	Ahmed et al. 2007	Bacillota	"Bacillia"	Bacillales_A	Planococcaceae	"Fusibacillus" Pribram 1929 non Bai et al. 2023; "Lineola" Pringsheim & Robinow 1947 ex Pringsheim 1950 non von Baer 1827
Metalysinibacillus	Gupta & Patel 2020	Bacillota	"Bacillia"	Bacillales_A	Planococcaceae	
Metaplanococcus	Gupta & Patel 2020	Bacillota	"Bacillia"	Bacillales_A	Planococcaceae	
Metasolibacillus	Gupta & Patel 2020	Bacillota	"Bacillia"	Bacillales_A	Planococcaceae	
Paenisporosarcina	Krishnamurthi et al. 2009	Bacillota	"Bacillia"	Bacillales_A	Planococcaceae	
Planococcus	Migula 1894 non Ferris 1950	Bacillota	"Bacillia"	Bacillales_A	Planococcaceae	Planomicrobium Yoon et al. 2001
Psychrobacillus	Krishnamurthi et al. 2011	Bacillota	"Bacillia"	Bacillales_A	Planococcaceae	
Rummeliibacillus	Vaishampayan et al. 2009	Bacillota	"Bacillia"	Bacillales_A	Planococcaceae	
Savagea	Whitehead et al. 2015	Bacillota	"Bacillia"	Bacillales_A	Planococcaceae	
Solibacillus	Krishnamurthi et al. 2009	Bacillota	"Bacillia"	Bacillales_A	Planococcaceae	
Sporosarcina	Orla-Jensen 1909	Bacillota	"Bacillia"	Bacillales_A	Planococcaceae	Filibacter Maiden & Jones 1985; "Urobacillus" Miquel 1889
"Stomatostreptococcus"	Ping et al. 1998	Bacillota	"Bacillia"	Bacillales_A	Planococcaceae	
Ureibacillus	Fortina et al. 2001	Bacillota	"Bacillia"	Bacillales_A	Planococcaceae	
Viridibacillus	Albert et al. 2007	Bacillota	"Bacillia"	Bacillales_A	Planococcaceae	
Calidifontibacillus	Adiguzel et al. 2020	Bacillota	"Bacillia"	Bacillales_C	Schinkiaceae	
Schinkia	Gupta et al. 2020	Bacillota	"Bacillia"	Bacillales_C	Schinkiaceae	
Pontibacillus	Lim et al. 2005	Bacillota	"Bacillia"	Bacillales_D	BH030062	
Alkalibacillus	Jeon et al. 2005	Bacillota	"Bacillia"	Bacillales_D	Alkalibacillaceae	
Allobacillus	Sheu et al. 2011	Bacillota	"Bacillia"	Bacillales_D	Alkalibacillaceae	
Aquisalibacillus	Marquez et al. 2008	Bacillota	"Bacillia"	Bacillales_D	Alkalibacillaceae	
Filobacillus	Schlesner et al. 2001	Bacillota	"Bacillia"	Bacillales_D	Alkalibacillaceae	
Halalkalibacillus	Echigo et al. 2007	Bacillota	"Bacillia"	Bacillales_D	Alkalibacillaceae	
Melghiribacillus	Addou et al. 2015	Bacillota	"Bacillia"	Bacillales_D	Alkalibacillaceae	
Piscibacillus	Tanasupawat et al. 2007	Bacillota	"Bacillia"	Bacillales_D	Alkalibacillaceae	
Salinibacillus	Ren & Zhou 2005	Bacillota	"Bacillia"	Bacillales_D	Alkalibacillaceae	
Salirhabdus	Albuquerque et al. 2007	Bacillota	"Bacillia"	Bacillales_D	Alkalibacillaceae	
Tenuibacillus	Ren & Zhou 2005	Bacillota	"Bacillia"	Bacillales_D	Alkalibacillaceae	
Alkalilactibacillus	Schmidt, Prieme & Stougaard 2016	Bacillota	"Bacillia"	Bacillales_D	Amphibacillaceae	
Amphibacillus	Niimura et al. 1990	Bacillota	"Bacillia"	Bacillales_D	Amphibacillaceae	
Aquibacillus	Amoozegar et al. 2014	Bacillota	"Bacillia"	Bacillales_D	Amphibacillaceae	
"Ca. Avamphibacillus"	Gilroy et al. 2021	Bacillota	"Bacillia"	Bacillales_D	Amphibacillaceae	
Cerasibacillus	Nakamura et al. 2004	Bacillota	"Bacillia"	Bacillales_D	Amphibacillaceae	
Gracilibacillus	Wainø et al. 1999	Bacillota	"Bacillia"	Bacillales_D	Amphibacillaceae	
Halolactibacillus	Ishikawa et al. 2005	Bacillota	"Bacillia"	Bacillales_D	Amphibacillaceae	
Lentibacillus	Yoon, Kang & Park 2002	Bacillota	"Bacillia"	Bacillales_D	Amphibacillaceae	
Natronobacillus	Sorokin et al. 2009	Bacillota	"Bacillia"	Bacillales_D	Amphibacillaceae	
Oceanobacillus	Lu et al. 2002	Bacillota	"Bacillia"	Bacillales_D	Amphibacillaceae	Compostibacillus Yu et al. 2015
Ornithinibacillus	Mayr et al. 2006	Bacillota	"Bacillia"	Bacillales_D	Amphibacillaceae	Paucisalibacillus Nunes et al. 2006
Paraliobacillus	Ishikawa et al. 2003	Bacillota	"Bacillia"	Bacillales_D	Amphibacillaceae	
Pelagirhabdus	Sultanpuram et al. 2016	Bacillota	"Bacillia"	Bacillales_D	Amphibacillaceae	
Pseudogracilibacillus	Glaeser et al. 2014	Bacillota	"Bacillia"	Bacillales_D	Amphibacillaceae	
Radiobacillus	Li et al. 2020	Bacillota	"Bacillia"	Bacillales_D	Amphibacillaceae	
Saliterribacillus	Amoozegar et al. 2013	Bacillota	"Bacillia"	Bacillales_D	Amphibacillaceae	
Sediminibacillus	Carrasco et al. 2008	Bacillota	"Bacillia"	Bacillales_D	Amphibacillaceae	
Sinibacillus	Yang & Zhou 2014	Bacillota	"Bacillia"	Bacillales_D	Amphibacillaceae	
Streptohalobacillus	Wang, Xue & Ma 2011	Bacillota	"Bacillia"	Bacillales_D	Amphibacillaceae	
Terribacillus	An et al. 2007	Bacillota	"Bacillia"	Bacillales_D	Amphibacillaceae	Pelagibacillus Kim et al. 2007
Terrihalobacillus	Galisteo et al. 2023	Bacillota	"Bacillia"	Bacillales_D	Amphibacillaceae	
Tigheibacillus	Miliotis et al. 2024	Bacillota	"Bacillia"	Bacillales_D	Amphibacillaceae	
Virgibacillus	Heyndrickx et al. 1998	Bacillota	"Bacillia"	Bacillales_D	Amphibacillaceae	Agaribacter Teramoto & Nishijima 2014; Salibacillus Wainø et al. 1999
Halobacillus	Spring et al. 1996	Bacillota	"Bacillia"	Bacillales_D	Halobacillaceae	
Salimicrobium	Yoon, Kang & Oh 2007	Bacillota	"Bacillia"	Bacillales_D	Halobacillaceae	
Thalassobacillus	García et al. 2005	Bacillota	"Bacillia"	Bacillales_D	Halobacillaceae	
Lottiidibacillus	Liu et al. 2020	Bacillota	"Bacillia"	Bacillales_E	Lottiidibacillaceae	
"Massilibacterium"	Tidjani Alou et al. 2016	Bacillota	"Bacillia"	Bacillales_E	"Massilibacteriaceae"	
Fictibacillus	Glaeser et al. 2013	Bacillota	"Bacillia"	Bacillales_G	Fictibacillaceae	
Pseudalkalibacillus	Joshi et al. 2022	Bacillota	"Bacillia"	Bacillales_G	Fictibacillaceae	
"Maribacillus"	Liu et al. 2019	Bacillota	"Bacillia"	Bacillales_G	"Maribacillaceae"	
Pueribacillus	Wang et al. 2018	Bacillota	"Bacillia"	Bacillales_G	"Maribacillaceae"	
Anaerobacillus	Zavarzina et al. 2010 non Janke 1930	Bacillota	"Bacillia"	Bacillales_H	Anaerobacillaceae	
Desertibacillus	Bhatt et al. 2017	Bacillota	"Bacillia"	Bacillales_H	"Desertibacillaceae"	
Alkalicoccobacillus	Joshi et al. 2022	Bacillota	"Bacillia"	Bacillales_H	Bacillaceae_D	
Alkalihalobacillus	Patel & Gupta 2020	Bacillota	"Bacillia"	Bacillales_H	Bacillaceae_D	
Alkalihalophilus	Joshi et al. 2022	Bacillota	"Bacillia"	Bacillales_H	Bacillaceae_D	
Fermentibacillus	Hirota, Aino & Yumoto 2016	Bacillota	"Bacillia"	Bacillales_H	Bacillaceae_D	
Halalkalibacter	Joshi et al. 2022	Bacillota	"Bacillia"	Bacillales_H	Bacillaceae_D	
Halalkalibacterium	Joshi et al. 2022 non Wu et al. 2022	Bacillota	"Bacillia"	Bacillales_H	Bacillaceae_D	
Halalkalibaculum	Wu et al. 2022	Bacillota	"Bacillia"	Bacillales_H	Bacillaceae_D	
Polygonibacillus	Hirota et al. 2016	Bacillota	"Bacillia"	Bacillales_H	Bacillaceae_D	
Shouchella	Joshi et al. 2022	Bacillota	"Bacillia"	Bacillales_H	Bacillaceae_D	
Alkalihalobacterium	Joshi et al. 2022	Bacillota	"Bacillia"	Bacillales_H	Bacillaceae_F	
Aidingibacillus	Wang et al. 2021	Bacillota	"Bacillia"	Bacillales_H	Marinococcaceae	
Aliibacillus	Xu et al. 2019	Bacillota	"Bacillia"	Bacillales_H	Marinococcaceae	
Alteribacillus	Didari et al. 2012	Bacillota	"Bacillia"	Bacillales_H	Marinococcaceae	
Geomicrobium	Echigo et al. 2010	Bacillota	"Bacillia"	Bacillales_H	Marinococcaceae	
Marinococcus	Hao, Kocur & Komagata 1985	Bacillota	"Bacillia"	Bacillales_H	Marinococcaceae	
Natribacillus	Echigo et al. 2012	Bacillota	"Bacillia"	Bacillales_H	Marinococcaceae	
Salibacterium	Reddy et al. 2015	Bacillota	"Bacillia"	Bacillales_H	Marinococcaceae	
Salicibibacter	Jang et al. 2021	Bacillota	"Bacillia"	Bacillales_H	Marinococcaceae	
Salsuginibacillus	Carrasco et al. 2007	Bacillota	"Bacillia"	Bacillales_H	Marinococcaceae	
Sinobaca	Li et al. 2006 ex Li et al. 2008	Bacillota	"Bacillia"	Bacillales_H	Marinococcaceae	
Alkalicoccus	Zhao et al. 2017	Bacillota	"Bacillia"	Bacillales_H	Salisediminibacteriaceae	
Alteribacter	Gupta et al. 2020	Bacillota	"Bacillia"	Bacillales_H	Salisediminibacteriaceae	
Evansella	Gupta et al. 2020	Bacillota	"Bacillia"	Bacillales_H	Salisediminibacteriaceae	
Paenalkalicoccus	Xu et al. 2022	Bacillota	"Bacillia"	Bacillales_H	Salisediminibacteriaceae	
Salipaludibacillus	Sultanpuram & Mothe 2016	Bacillota	"Bacillia"	Bacillales_H	Salisediminibacteriaceae	
Salisediminibacterium	Jiang et al. 2012	Bacillota	"Bacillia"	Bacillales_H	Salisediminibacteriaceae	
Texcoconibacillus	Ruiz-Romero et al. 2013	Bacillota	"Bacillia"	Bacillales_H	Salisediminibacteriaceae	
Caenibacillus	Tsujimoto et al. 2016	Bacillota	"Bacillia"	Bacillales_K	Sporolactobacillaceae	
Camelliibacillus	Lin, Yan & Yi 2018	Bacillota	"Bacillia"	Bacillales_K	Sporolactobacillaceae	
Pullulanibacillus	Hatayama et al. 2006	Bacillota	"Bacillia"	Bacillales_K	Sporolactobacillaceae	
Scopulibacillus	Lee & Lee 2015	Bacillota	"Bacillia"	Bacillales_K	Sporolactobacillaceae	
Sporolactobacillus	(Kitahara & Suzuki 1963) Kitahara & Lai 1967	Bacillota	"Bacillia"	Bacillales_K	Sporolactobacillaceae	
Terrilactibacillus	Prasirtsak et al. 2016	Bacillota	"Bacillia"	Bacillales_K	Sporolactobacillaceae	
Tuberibacillus	Hatayama et al. 2006	Bacillota	"Bacillia"	Bacillales_K	Sporolactobacillaceae	
Aeribacillus	Minana-Galbis et al. 2010	Bacillota	"Bacillia"	Bacillales	Aeribacillaceae	
Anoxybacillus	Pikuta et al. 2000	Bacillota	"Bacillia"	Bacillales	Anoxybacillaceae	
Anoxybacteroides	Patel, Bello & Gupta 2024	Bacillota	"Bacillia"	Bacillales	Anoxybacillaceae	
Geobacillus	Nazina et al. 2001	Bacillota	"Bacillia"	Bacillales	Anoxybacillaceae	
Parageobacillus	Aliyu et al. 2019	Bacillota	"Bacillia"	Bacillales	Anoxybacillaceae	
Paranoxybacillus	Patel, Bello & Gupta 2024	Bacillota	"Bacillia"	Bacillales	Anoxybacillaceae	
Saccharococcus	Nystrand 1984	Bacillota	"Bacillia"	Bacillales	Anoxybacillaceae	
Thermaerobacillus	Patel, Bello & Gupta 2024	Bacillota	"Bacillia"	Bacillales	Anoxybacillaceae	
Thermolongibacillus	Cihan et al. 2014	Bacillota	"Bacillia"	Bacillales	Anoxybacillaceae	
Ectobacillus	Gupta et al. 2020	Bacillota	"Bacillia"	Bacillales	Bacillaceae_G	
Gottfriedia	Gupta et al. 2020	Bacillota	"Bacillia"	Bacillales	Bacillaceae_G	
Priestia	Gupta et al. 2020	Bacillota	"Bacillia"	Bacillales	Bacillaceae_H	"Flexus" Pribram 1929; "Megatherium" Pribram 1929 non Cuvier 1796; "Zopfiella" Trevisan 1885 non Winter 1884
Ferdinandcohnia	corrig. Gupta et al. 2020	Bacillota	"Bacillia"	Bacillales	Bacillaceae_L	
Litchfieldia	Gupta et al. 2020	Bacillota	"Bacillia"	Bacillales	Bacillaceae_L	
"Aciduricibacillus"	Liu et al. 2024	Bacillota	"Bacillia"	Bacillales	Bacillaceae	
Bacillus	Cohn 1872 non Latreille 1825 ex Berthold 1827	Bacillota	"Bacillia"	Bacillales	Bacillaceae	
Calculibacillus	Min et al. 2021	Bacillota	"Bacillia"	Bacillales	Bacillaceae	
"Jilinibacillus"	Liu et al. 2015	Bacillota	"Bacillia"	Bacillales	Bacillaceae	
Metabacillus	Patel & Gupta 2020	Bacillota	"Bacillia"	Bacillales	Bacillaceae	
Swionibacillus	Li et al. 2017	Bacillota	"Bacillia"	Bacillales	Bacillaceae	
Sutcliffiella	Gupta et al. 2020	Bacillota	"Bacillia"	Bacillales	Sutcliffiellaceae	
Peribacillus	Patel & Gupta 2020	Bacillota	"Bacillia"	"Caldibacillales"	DSM-1321	
Oikeobacillus	Narsing Rao et al. 2023	Bacillota	"Bacillia"	"Caldibacillales"	DSM-23947	
Mangrovibacillus	Yang et al. 2023	Bacillota	"Bacillia"	"Caldibacillales"	R1DC41	
Caldibacillus	Coorevits et al. 2012	Bacillota	"Bacillia"	"Caldibacillales"	Caldibacillaceae	
Caldifermentibacillus	Yang et al. 2023	Bacillota	"Bacillia"	"Caldibacillales"	Caldibacillaceae	
Fervidibacillus	Yang et al. 2023	Bacillota	"Bacillia"	"Caldibacillales"	Caldibacillaceae	
Pallidibacillus	Yang et al. 2023	Bacillota	"Bacillia"	"Caldibacillales"	Caldibacillaceae	
Perspicuibacillus	Yang et al. 2023	Bacillota	"Bacillia"	"Caldibacillales"	Caldibacillaceae	
"Aliineobacillus"	Yang et al. 2025	Bacillota	"Bacillia"	"Caldibacillales"	Cytobacillaceae	
Cytobacillus	Patel & Gupta 2020	Bacillota	"Bacillia"	"Caldibacillales"	Cytobacillaceae	
Mesobacillus	Patel & Gupta 2020	Bacillota	"Bacillia"	"Caldibacillales"	Cytobacillaceae	
Neobacillus	Patel & Gupta 2020	Bacillota	"Bacillia"	"Caldibacillales"	Cytobacillaceae	
Niallia	Gupta et al. 2020	Bacillota	"Bacillia"	"Caldibacillales"	Cytobacillaceae	
Pseudoneobacillus	Kämpfer et al. 2022	Bacillota	"Bacillia"	"Caldibacillales"	Cytobacillaceae	
Robertmurraya	Gupta et al. 2020	Bacillota	"Bacillia"	"Caldibacillales"	Cytobacillaceae	
Domibacillus	Seiler, Wenning & Scherer 2013	Bacillota	"Bacillia"	"Caldibacillales"	Domibacillaceae	
Pseudobacillus	Verma et al. 2024 non Pribram 1929	Bacillota	"Bacillia"	"Caldibacillales"	Domibacillaceae	
"Quasibacillus"	Verma et al. 2017	Bacillota	"Bacillia"	"Caldibacillales"	Domibacillaceae	
Falsibacillus	Zhou et al. 2009	Bacillota	"Bacillia"	"Caldibacillales"	Falsibacillaceae	
Heyndrickxia	Gupta et al. 2020	Bacillota	"Bacillia"	"Caldibacillales"	Heyndrickxiaceae	
Lederbergia	Gupta et al. 2020	Bacillota	"Bacillia"	"Caldibacillales"	Heyndrickxiaceae	"Paracerasibacillus" Miliotis et al. 2024
Margalitia	Gupta et al. 2020	Bacillota	"Bacillia"	"Caldibacillales"	Heyndrickxiaceae	
Siminovitchia	Gupta et al. 2020	Bacillota	"Bacillia"	"Caldibacillales"	Heyndrickxiaceae	
Weizmannia	Gupta et al. 2020	Bacillota	"Bacillia"	"Caldibacillales"	Heyndrickxiaceae	
Jeotgalibacillus	Yoon et al. 2001	Bacillota	"Bacillia"	"Caldibacillales"	Jeotgalibacillaceae	Marinibacillus Yoon et al. 2001
Pradoshia	Saha et al. 2019	Bacillota	"Bacillia"	"Caldibacillales"	Pradoshiaceae	
Rossellomorea	Gupta et al. 2020	Bacillota	"Bacillia"	"Caldibacillales"	Rossellomoreaceae	
"Ca. Bathoplasma"	corrig. Zhu, Lian & He 2020	Bacillota	"Bacillia"	"Bathyoplasmales"	"Bathyoplasmaceae"	
Brevibacillus	Shida et al. 1996	Bacillota	"Bacillia"	Brevibacillales	Brevibacillaceae	
Brockia	Perevalova et al. 2013	Bacillota	"Bacillia"	"Brockiales"	"Brockiaceae"	
"Ca. Carbonibacillus"	corrig. Kadnikov et al. 2018	Bacillota	"Bacillia"	"Brockiales"	"Brockiaceae"	
Hydrogenibacillus	Kämpfer et al. 2013	Bacillota	"Bacillia"	"Brockiales"	"Brockiaceae"	
Caldalkalibacillus	Xue et al. 2006	Bacillota	"Bacillia"	Caldalkalibacillales	Caldalkalibacillaceae	"Thermalkalibacillus" Zhao et al. 2006
Calditerricola	Moriya et al. 2011	Bacillota	"Bacillia"	Calditerricolales	Calditerricolaceae	
Culicoidibacter	Neupane et al. 2020	Bacillota	"Bacillia"	Culicoidibacterales	Culicoidibacteraceae	
Desulfuribacillus	Sorokin et al. 2014	Bacillota	"Bacillia"	Desulfuribacillales	Desulfuribacillaceae	
Allocoprobacillus	Teng et al. 2023	Bacillota	"Bacillia"	Erysipelotrichales	Coprobacillaceae	
"Beduinia"	corrig. Mourembou et al. 2015	Bacillota	"Bacillia"	Erysipelotrichales	Coprobacillaceae	"Beduini" Mourembou et al. 2015
Catenibacterium	Kageyama & Benno 2000	Bacillota	"Bacillia"	Erysipelotrichales	Coprobacillaceae	
Coprobacillus	corrig. Kageyama & Benno 2000	Bacillota	"Bacillia"	Erysipelotrichales	Coprobacillaceae	
Eggerthia	Salvetti et al. 2011	Bacillota	"Bacillia"	Erysipelotrichales	Coprobacillaceae	"Catenabacterium" Prévot 1938
Faecalibacillus	Seo et al. 2019	Bacillota	"Bacillia"	Erysipelotrichales	Coprobacillaceae	
"Ca. Fimiplasma"	Gilroy et al. 2021	Bacillota	"Bacillia"	Erysipelotrichales	Coprobacillaceae	
Intestinibaculum	Kim et al. 2020	Bacillota	"Bacillia"	Erysipelotrichales	Coprobacillaceae	
Kandleria	Salvetti et al. 2011	Bacillota	"Bacillia"	Erysipelotrichales	Coprobacillaceae	
Longibaculum	Lagkouvardos et al. 2017	Bacillota	"Bacillia"	Erysipelotrichales	Coprobacillaceae	
Sharpea	Morita et al. 2008	Bacillota	"Bacillia"	Erysipelotrichales	Coprobacillaceae	
"Ca. Stoquefichus"	Pfleiderer et al. 2013	Bacillota	"Bacillia"	Erysipelotrichales	Coprobacillaceae	
Tannockella	Pardesi et al. 2022	Bacillota	"Bacillia"	Erysipelotrichales	Coprobacillaceae	
Thomasclavelia	Lawson, Saavedra Perez & Sankaranarayanan 2023	Bacillota	"Bacillia"	Erysipelotrichales	Coprobacillaceae	"Ramibacterium" Prévot 1938; "Erysipelatoclostridium" Yutin & Galperin 2013
Absiella	Paek et al. 2020	Bacillota	"Bacillia"	Erysipelotrichales	Erysipelotrichaceae	
Absicoccus	Shin et al. 2020	Bacillota	"Bacillia"	Erysipelotrichales	Erysipelotrichaceae	
Allobaculum	Greetham et al. 2006	Bacillota	"Bacillia"	Erysipelotrichales	Erysipelotrichaceae	
Amedibacillus	Ikeyama et al. 2020	Bacillota	"Bacillia"	Erysipelotrichales	Erysipelotrichaceae	
Amedibacterium	Ikeyama et al. 2020	Bacillota	"Bacillia"	Erysipelotrichales	Erysipelotrichaceae	
Anaerorhabdus	Shah & Collins 1986	Bacillota	"Bacillia"	Erysipelotrichales	Erysipelotrichaceae	
Breznakia	Tegtmeier et al. 2016	Bacillota	"Bacillia"	Erysipelotrichales	Erysipelotrichaceae	
Bulleidia	Downes et al. 2000	Bacillota	"Bacillia"	Erysipelotrichales	Erysipelotrichaceae	"Anaerolactibacter" Togo et al. 2019; "Galactobacillus" Togo et al. 2019; Grylomicrobium Hitch et al. 2025; "Lactimicrobium" Togo et al. 2019; "Lactomassilus" Togo et al. 2018; Solobacterium Kageyama & Benno 2000; Stecheria Wylensek et al. 2021
Catenisphaera	Kanno et al. 2015	Bacillota	"Bacillia"	Erysipelotrichales	Erysipelotrichaceae	
"Ca. Colivicinus"	Gilroy et al. 2022	Bacillota	"Bacillia"	Erysipelotrichales	Erysipelotrichaceae	
Copranaerobaculum	Feng et al. 2022	Bacillota	"Bacillia"	Erysipelotrichales	Erysipelotrichaceae	
"Dakotella"	Ghimire et al. 2020	Bacillota	"Bacillia"	Erysipelotrichales	Erysipelotrichaceae	
Dielma	Ramasamy et al. 2016	Bacillota	"Bacillia"	Erysipelotrichales	Erysipelotrichaceae	
Dubosiella	Cox et al. 2017	Bacillota	"Bacillia"	Erysipelotrichales	Erysipelotrichaceae	
Erysipelothrix	Rosenbach 1909	Bacillota	"Bacillia"	Erysipelotrichales	Erysipelotrichaceae	
Faecalibaculum	Chang et al. 2016	Bacillota	"Bacillia"	Erysipelotrichales	Erysipelotrichaceae	
Faecalicoccus	Maesschalck et al. 2014	Bacillota	"Bacillia"	Erysipelotrichales	Erysipelotrichaceae	
Faecalitalea	De Maesschalck et al. 2014	Bacillota	"Bacillia"	Erysipelotrichales	Erysipelotrichaceae	
Floccifex	Wylensek et al. 2021	Bacillota	"Bacillia"	Erysipelotrichales	Erysipelotrichaceae	
Holdemanella	De Maesschalck et al. 2014	Bacillota	"Bacillia"	Erysipelotrichales	Erysipelotrichaceae	
Holdemania	Willems et al. 1997	Bacillota	"Bacillia"	Erysipelotrichales	Erysipelotrichaceae	
Hoskinsella	Pudlo et al. 2026	Bacillota	"Bacillia"	Erysipelotrichales	Erysipelotrichaceae	
Ileibacterium	Cox et al. 2017 non Mailhe et al. 2017	Bacillota	"Bacillia"	Erysipelotrichales	Erysipelotrichaceae	
Longicatena	Lagkouvardos et al. 2016	Bacillota	"Bacillia"	Erysipelotrichales	Erysipelotrichaceae	
"Massilicoli"	Ndongo et al. 2019	Bacillota	"Bacillia"	Erysipelotrichales	Erysipelotrichaceae	"Ca. Onthosoma" Gilroy et al. 2021
"Merdibacter"	Ricaboni et al. 2017	Bacillota	"Bacillia"	Erysipelotrichales	Erysipelotrichaceae	
"Obesitatibacterium"	Liu et al. 2020	Bacillota	"Bacillia"	Erysipelotrichales	Erysipelotrichaceae	
Traorella	Mailhe et al. 2017 ex Bonnet et al. 2026	Bacillota	"Bacillia"	Erysipelotrichales	Erysipelotrichaceae	
Zhonglingia	Hitch et al. 2025	Bacillota	"Bacillia"	Erysipelotrichales	Erysipelotrichaceae	
Exiguobacterium	Collins et al. 1984	Bacillota	"Bacillia"	Exiguobacterales	Exiguobacteraceae	
Haloplasma	Antunes et al. 2008 non Zhou et al. 2022	Bacillota	"Bacillia"	Haloplasmatales	Haloplasmataceae	
"Inordinaticella"		Bacillota	"Bacillia"	Haloplasmatales	Haloplasmataceae	
Turicibacter	Bosshard, Zbinden & Altwegg 2002	Bacillota	"Bacillia"	MOL361	Turicibacteraceae	
"Ca. Harrysmithiimonas"	corrig. Glendinning et al. 2020	Bacillota	"Bacillia"	"Harrysmithimonadales"	"Harrysmithimonadaceae"	
"Hujiaoplasma"	Zheng et al. 2023	Bacillota	"Bacillia"	"Izemoplasmatales"	"Hujiaoplasmataceae"	
"Ca. Izemoplasma"	corrig. Skennerton et al. 2016	Bacillota	"Bacillia"	"Izemoplasmatales"	"Izemoplasmataceae"	
"Ca. Izemobacterium"	Viver & Robador 2025	Bacillota	"Bacillia"	"Izemoplasmatales"	"Izemoplasmataceae"	
"Liberiplasma"	Khomyakova et al. 2025	Bacillota	"Bacillia"	"Izemoplasmatales"	"Izemoplasmataceae"	
"Ca. Xianfuyuplasma"	Zheng et al. 2021	Bacillota	"Bacillia"	"Izemoplasmatales"	"Izemoplasmataceae"	
Kyrpidia	Klenk et al. 2012	Bacillota	"Bacillia"	Kyrpidiales	Kyrpidiaceae	
"Aerosphaera"	Hutson & Collins 2000 non Gerneck 1907	Bacillota	"Bacillia"	Lactobacillales		
"Carnococcus"	Tanner et al. 1995	Bacillota	"Bacillia"	Lactobacillales		
Chungangia	Kim et al. 2012	Bacillota	"Bacillia"	Lactobacillales		
Abiotrophia	Kawamura et al. 1995	Bacillota	"Bacillia"	Lactobacillales	Aerococcaceae	
Aerococcus	Williams, Hirch & Cowan 1953	Bacillota	"Bacillia"	Lactobacillales	Aerococcaceae	
Atopobacter	Lawson et al. 2000	Bacillota	"Bacillia"	Lactobacillales	Aerococcaceae	
Bavariicoccus	Schmidt et al. 2009	Bacillota	"Bacillia"	Lactobacillales	Aerococcaceae	
Dolosicoccus	Collins et al. 1999	Bacillota	"Bacillia"	Lactobacillales	Aerococcaceae	
Eremococcus	Collins et al. 1999	Bacillota	"Bacillia"	Lactobacillales	Aerococcaceae	
Facklamia	Collins et al. 1997	Bacillota	"Bacillia"	Lactobacillales	Aerococcaceae	
Falseniella	Fotedar et al. 2021	Bacillota	"Bacillia"	Lactobacillales	Aerococcaceae	
Fundicoccus	Siebert et al. 2020	Bacillota	"Bacillia"	Lactobacillales	Aerococcaceae	
Globicatella	Collins et al. 1995	Bacillota	"Bacillia"	Lactobacillales	Aerococcaceae	
Granulicatella	Collins & Lawson 2000	Bacillota	"Bacillia"	Lactobacillales	Aerococcaceae	
Hutsoniella	Fotedar et al. 2021	Bacillota	"Bacillia"	Lactobacillales	Aerococcaceae	
Ignavigranum	Collins et al. 1999	Bacillota	"Bacillia"	Lactobacillales	Aerococcaceae	
Jeotgalibaca	Lee et al. 2014	Bacillota	"Bacillia"	Lactobacillales	Aerococcaceae	
"Ruoffia"	Fotedar et al. 2021	Bacillota	"Bacillia"	Lactobacillales	Aerococcaceae	
Suicoccus	Li et al. 2019	Bacillota	"Bacillia"	Lactobacillales	Aerococcaceae	
Vaginisenegalia	Lo et al. 2019	Bacillota	"Bacillia"	Lactobacillales	Aerococcaceae	
Trichococcus	Scheff, Salcher & Lingens 1984	Bacillota	"Bacillia"	Lactobacillales	Aerococcaceae	Lactosphaera Janssen et al. 1995
Alkalibacterium	Ntougias & Russell 2001	Bacillota	"Bacillia"	Lactobacillales	Carnobacteriaceae	
Allofustis	Collins et al. 2003	Bacillota	"Bacillia"	Lactobacillales	Carnobacteriaceae	
Alloiococcus	Aguirre & Collins 1992	Bacillota	"Bacillia"	Lactobacillales	Carnobacteriaceae	
Atopococcus	Collins et al. 2005	Bacillota	"Bacillia"	Lactobacillales	Carnobacteriaceae	
Atopostipes	Cotta et al. 2004	Bacillota	"Bacillia"	Lactobacillales	Carnobacteriaceae	
Carnobacterium	Collins et al. 1987	Bacillota	"Bacillia"	Lactobacillales	Carnobacteriaceae	
Desemzia	Stackebrandt et al. 1999	Bacillota	"Bacillia"	Lactobacillales	Carnobacteriaceae	
Dolosigranulum	Aguirre et al. 1994	Bacillota	"Bacillia"	Lactobacillales	Carnobacteriaceae	
Isobaculum	Collins et al. 2002	Bacillota	"Bacillia"	Lactobacillales	Carnobacteriaceae	
Lacticigenium	corrig. Iino, Suzuki & Harayama 2009	Bacillota	"Bacillia"	Lactobacillales	Carnobacteriaceae	
Marinilactibacillus	Ishikawa et al. 2003	Bacillota	"Bacillia"	Lactobacillales	Carnobacteriaceae	
Pisciglobus	Tanasupawat et al. 2011	Bacillota	"Bacillia"	Lactobacillales	Carnobacteriaceae	
Catellicoccus	Lawson et al. 2006	Bacillota	"Bacillia"	Lactobacillales	Catellicoccaceae	
Enterococcus	Thiercelin & Jouhaud 1903 ex Schleifer & Kilpper-Bälz 1984	Bacillota	"Bacillia"	Lactobacillales	Enterococcaceae	"Caseococcus" Gorini 1926; "Mammococcus" Gorini 1934
Melissococcus	Bailey & Collins 1983	Bacillota	"Bacillia"	Lactobacillales	Enterococcaceae	
Tetragenococcus	Collins, Williams & Wallbanks 1993	Bacillota	"Bacillia"	Lactobacillales	Enterococcaceae	
Acetilactobacillus	Zheng et al. 2020	Bacillota	"Bacillia"	Lactobacillales	Lactobacillaceae	
Agrilactobacillus	Zheng et al. 2020	Bacillota	"Bacillia"	Lactobacillales	Lactobacillaceae	
Apilactobacillus	Zheng et al. 2020	Bacillota	"Bacillia"	Lactobacillales	Lactobacillaceae	
Amylolactobacillus	Zheng et al. 2020	Bacillota	"Bacillia"	Lactobacillales	Lactobacillaceae	
Bombilactobacillus	Zheng et al. 2020	Bacillota	"Bacillia"	Lactobacillales	Lactobacillaceae	
Companilactobacillus	Zheng et al. 2020	Bacillota	"Bacillia"	Lactobacillales	Lactobacillaceae	
Convivina	Praet et al. 2015	Bacillota	"Bacillia"	Lactobacillales	Lactobacillaceae	
Dellaglioa	Zheng et al. 2020	Bacillota	"Bacillia"	Lactobacillales	Lactobacillaceae	
Eupransor	Botero et al. 2024	Bacillota	"Bacillia"	Lactobacillales	Lactobacillaceae	
Fructilactobacillus	Zheng et al. 2020	Bacillota	"Bacillia"	Lactobacillales	Lactobacillaceae	
Fructobacillus	Endo & Okada 2008	Bacillota	"Bacillia"	Lactobacillales	Lactobacillaceae	
Furfurilactobacillus	Zheng et al. 2020	Bacillota	"Bacillia"	Lactobacillales	Lactobacillaceae	
"Ca. Gallilactobacillus"	Gilroy et al. 2021	Bacillota	"Bacillia"	Lactobacillales	Lactobacillaceae	
Holzapfeliella	Deshmukh & Oren 2023	Bacillota	"Bacillia"	Lactobacillales	Lactobacillaceae	Holzapfelia Zheng et al. 2020 non Cossmann 1901
Lacticaseibacillus	Zheng et al. 2020	Bacillota	"Bacillia"	Lactobacillales	Lactobacillaceae	"Caseobacterium" Orla-Jensen 1909; "Streptobacterium" Orla-Jensen 1919 non Jacqué & Masay 1912 non Maggi 1886 non Billet 1890
Lactiplantibacillus	Zheng et al. 2020	Bacillota	"Bacillia"	Lactobacillales	Lactobacillaceae	
Lactobacillus	Beijerinck 1901	Bacillota	"Bacillia"	Lactobacillales	Lactobacillaceae	"Thermobacterium" Orla-Jensen 1919 non Chen et al. 2023
Lapidilactobacillus	Zheng et al. 2020	Bacillota	"Bacillia"	Lactobacillales	Lactobacillaceae	
Latilactobacillus	Zheng et al. 2020	Bacillota	"Bacillia"	Lactobacillales	Lactobacillaceae	
Lentilactobacillus	Zheng et al. 2020	Bacillota	"Bacillia"	Lactobacillales	Lactobacillaceae	
Leuconostoc	van Tieghem 1878	Bacillota	"Bacillia"	Lactobacillales	Lactobacillaceae	"Betacoccus" Orla-Jensen 1919
Levilactobacillus	Zheng et al. 2020	Bacillota	"Bacillia"	Lactobacillales	Lactobacillaceae	"Betabacterium" Orla-Jensen 1919
Ligilactobacillus	Zheng et al. 2020	Bacillota	"Bacillia"	Lactobacillales	Lactobacillaceae	
Limosilactobacillus	Zheng et al. 2020	Bacillota	"Bacillia"	Lactobacillales	Lactobacillaceae	
Liquorilactobacillus	Zheng et al. 2020	Bacillota	"Bacillia"	Lactobacillales	Lactobacillaceae	
Loigolactobacillus	Zheng et al. 2020	Bacillota	"Bacillia"	Lactobacillales	Lactobacillaceae	
Nicoliella	Deshmukh & Oren 2023	Bacillota	"Bacillia"	Lactobacillales	Lactobacillaceae	Nicolia Oliphant et al. 2022 non Unger 1842 non Gibson-Smith & Gibson-Smith 1979 non Gregorio 1880
Oenococcus	Dicks, Dellaglio & Collins 1995	Bacillota	"Bacillia"	Lactobacillales	Lactobacillaceae	
Paralactobacillus	Leisner et al. 2000	Bacillota	"Bacillia"	Lactobacillales	Lactobacillaceae	
Paucilactobacillus	Zheng et al. 2020	Bacillota	"Bacillia"	Lactobacillales	Lactobacillaceae	
Pediococcus	Balcke 1884 ex Claussen 1903	Bacillota	"Bacillia"	Lactobacillales	Lactobacillaceae	
Periweissella	Bello, Rudra & Gupta 2022	Bacillota	"Bacillia"	Lactobacillales	Lactobacillaceae	
Philodulcilactobacillus	Kouya et al. 2023	Bacillota	"Bacillia"	Lactobacillales	Lactobacillaceae	
Schleiferilactobacillus	Zheng et al. 2020	Bacillota	"Bacillia"	Lactobacillales	Lactobacillaceae	
Secundilactobacillus	Zheng et al. 2020	Bacillota	"Bacillia"	Lactobacillales	Lactobacillaceae	"Lactobacterium" van Steenberge 1920 non Krasilnikov 1949; "Saccharobacillus" van Laer 1892
Weissella	Collins et al. 1994	Bacillota	"Bacillia"	Lactobacillales	Lactobacillaceae	
Xylocopilactobacillus	Kawasaki et al. 2024	Bacillota	"Bacillia"	Lactobacillales	Lactobacillaceae	
Brochothrix	Sneath & Jones 1976	Bacillota	"Bacillia"	Lactobacillales	Listeriaceae	
Listeria	Pirie 1940 non Robineau-Desvoidy 1863 non de Niceville 1894 non Necker 1791 ex Rafinesque 1820	Bacillota	"Bacillia"	Lactobacillales	Listeriaceae	Listerella Pirie 1927 non Jahn 1906 non Cushman 1933; "Mesolisteria" Orsi & Wiedmann 2016 ex Bouznada et al. 2024; "Murraya" Stuart & Welshimer 1974 ex Bouznada et al. 2024 non Koenig ex von Linné 1771 non Weber & Beaufort, 1911
"Paenilisteria"	Orsi & Wiedmann 2016 ex Bouznada et al. 2024	Bacillota	"Bacillia"	Lactobacillales	Listeriaceae	
Floricoccus	Chuah et al. 2017	Bacillota	"Bacillia"	Lactobacillales	Streptococcaceae	"Anthococcus" Chuah et al. 2016 non Williams & Watson, 1990
Lactococcus	Beijerinck 1901 ex Schleifer et al. 1986	Bacillota	"Bacillia"	Lactobacillales	Streptococcaceae	
Lactovum	Matthies et al. 2005	Bacillota	"Bacillia"	Lactobacillales	Streptococcaceae	
"Okadaella"	Okada et al. 2003	Bacillota	"Bacillia"	Lactobacillales	Streptococcaceae	
Pilibacter	Higashiguchi et al. 2006	Bacillota	"Bacillia"	Lactobacillales	Streptococcaceae	
Streptococcus	Billroth 1874 ex Rosenbach 1884	Bacillota	"Bacillia"	Lactobacillales	Streptococcaceae	"Babesia" Trevisan 1889 non Starcovici 1893; "Diplococcus" Weichselbaum 1886 non Enderlein 1917 non Flügge 1886; "Mogallia" Enderlein 1917; "Perroncitoa" Trevisan 1889; "Pneumococcus" Arloing 1889; "Pseudostreptus" Enderlein 1917; "Schuetzia" Trevisan 1889 non Geinitz, 1863; "Sphaerococcus" Marpmann 1889 non Agardb 1823 non Maskell, 1892 non Stackhouse, 1797; "Streptus" Enderlein 1930
Vagococcus	Collins et al. 1990	Bacillota	"Bacillia"	Lactobacillales	Vagococcaceae	
"Ca. Bacilliplasma"	corrig. Kostanjsek, Strus & Avgustin 2007	Bacillota	"Bacillia"	Mycoplasmatales		
"Ca. Moeniiplasma"	corrig. Naito et al. 2017	Bacillota	"Bacillia"	Mycoplasmatales		"Ca. Glomeriplasma" Naito 2014
"Ca. Penaeiplasma"	Imaizumi et al. 2026	Bacillota	"Bacillia"	Mycoplasmatales		
"Ca. Foregutplasma"	Aubé et al. 2022	Bacillota	"Bacillia"	Mycoplasmatales	"Hepatoplasmataceae"	
"Ca. Hepatoplasma"	Wang et al. 2004	Bacillota	"Bacillia"	Mycoplasmatales	"Hepatoplasmataceae"	
"Ca. Tyloplasma"	Kawato et al. 2024	Bacillota	"Bacillia"	Mycoplasmatales	"Hepatoplasmataceae"	
Mesomycoplasma	Gupta et al. 2018	Bacillota	"Bacillia"	Mycoplasmatales	Metamycoplasmataceae	"Musculomyces" Sabin 1941
Metamycoplasma	Gupta et al. 2018	Bacillota	"Bacillia"	Mycoplasmatales	Metamycoplasmataceae	"Murimyces" Sabin 1941
Mycoplasmopsis	Gupta et al. 2018	Bacillota	"Bacillia"	Mycoplasmatales	Metamycoplasmataceae	"Anulomyces" Wroblewski 1931 non Bydgosz, 1932; "Capromyces" Sabin 1941
"Edwardiiplasma"	Gupta, Son &Oren 2019	Bacillota	"Bacillia"	Mycoplasmatales	Mycoplasmataceae	
Entomoplasma	Tully et al. 1993	Bacillota	"Bacillia"	Mycoplasmatales	Mycoplasmataceae	
"Ca. Mariplasma"	Ohdera et al. 2024	Bacillota	"Bacillia"	Mycoplasmatales	Mycoplasmataceae	
Mesoplasma	Tully et al. 1993	Bacillota	"Bacillia"	Mycoplasmatales	Mycoplasmataceae	
Mycoplasma	Nowak 1929	Bacillota	"Bacillia"	Mycoplasmatales	Mycoplasmataceae	"Asterococcus" Borrel et al. 1910 non Scherffel 1908 non Borkhsenius 1960; "Asteromyces" Wroblewski 1931 non Moreau & Moreau ex Hennebert 1962; "Borrelomyces" Turner 1935; "Bovimyces" Sabin 1941; Haemobartonella Tyzzer & Weinman 1939; "Pleuropneumonia" Tulasne & Brisou 1955
Spiroplasma	Saglio et al. 1973	Bacillota	"Bacillia"	Mycoplasmatales	Mycoplasmataceae	
Tullyiplasma	Gupta, Son & Oren 2025	Bacillota	"Bacillia"	Mycoplasmatales	Mycoplasmataceae	
"Ca. Vermiplasma"	corrig. Murakami et al. 2015	Bacillota	"Bacillia"	Mycoplasmatales	Mycoplasmataceae	
Williamsoniiplasma	Gupta, Son &Oren 2019	Bacillota	"Bacillia"	Mycoplasmatales	Mycoplasmataceae	
"Ca. Hennigella"	Gilroy et al. 2022	Bacillota	"Bacillia"	Mycoplasmatales	Mycoplasmoidaceae	
Eperythrozoon	Schilling 1928	Bacillota	"Bacillia"	Mycoplasmatales	Mycoplasmoidaceae	"Bertarellia" Carini 1930; "Gyromorpha" Dinger 1928
Malacoplasma	Gupta et al. 2018	Bacillota	"Bacillia"	Mycoplasmatales	Mycoplasmoidaceae	
Mycoplasmoides	Gupta et al. 2018	Bacillota	"Bacillia"	Mycoplasmatales	Mycoplasmoidaceae	"Schizoplasma" Furness, Pipes & McMurtrey 1968
Ureaplasma	Shepard et al. 1974	Bacillota	"Bacillia"	Mycoplasmatales	Mycoplasmoidaceae	
"Ca. Bathyplasma"	Wei et al. 2025	Bacillota	"Bacillia"	Mycoplasmatales	"Oceanoplasmataceae"	
"Oceanoplasma"	Vohsen et al. 2024	Bacillota	"Bacillia"	Mycoplasmatales	"Oceanoplasmataceae"	
"Ca. Thalassoplasma"	Vohsen et al. 2024	Bacillota	"Bacillia"	Mycoplasmatales	"Oceanoplasmataceae"	
Pasteuria	Metchnikoff 1888	Bacillota	"Bacillia"	"Pasteuriales"	Pasteuriaceae	
Insulibacter	corrig. Chhe et al. 2023	Bacillota	"Bacillia"	Paenibacillales	DA-C8	
Gorillibacterium	Keita et al. 2017	Bacillota	"Bacillia"	Paenibacillales	"Gorillibacteriaceae"	
Chengkuizengella	Cao et al. 2017	Bacillota	"Bacillia"	Paenibacillales	"Longirhabdaceae"	
Longirhabdus	pacificus Chen et al. 2019	Bacillota	"Bacillia"	Paenibacillales	"Longirhabdaceae"	
Ammoniibacillus	Sakai et al. 2015	Bacillota	"Bacillia"	Paenibacillales	Paenibacillaceae	
Cohnella	Kämpfer et al. 2006	Bacillota	"Bacillia"	Paenibacillales	Paenibacillaceae	
"Ferviditalea"	Chen et al. 2024	Bacillota	"Bacillia"	Paenibacillales	Paenibacillaceae	
Fontibacillus	Saha et al. 2010	Bacillota	"Bacillia"	Paenibacillales	Paenibacillaceae	"Zymobacillus" Kluyver & Van Niel 1936
Gordoniibacillus	corrig. Kudryashova et al. 2024	Bacillota	"Bacillia"	Paenibacillales	Paenibacillaceae	
Marinicrinis	Guo et al. 2016	Bacillota	"Bacillia"	Paenibacillales	Paenibacillaceae	
Paenibacillus	Ash, Priest & Collins 1994	Bacillota	"Bacillia"	Paenibacillales	Paenibacillaceae	"Aerobacillus" Donker 1926 non Pribram 1929; "Astasia" Meyer 1897 non Dujardin 1841 nom. con. non Ehrenberg 1830 non Scudder 1869 non Harris 1869
Paludirhabdus	Hwanget al. 2018	Bacillota	"Bacillia"	Paenibacillales	Paenibacillaceae	
"Ca. Pristimantibacillus"	Díaz Rodríguez et al. 2022	Bacillota	"Bacillia"	Paenibacillales	Paenibacillaceae	
Saccharibacillus	Rivas et al. 2008	Bacillota	"Bacillia"	Paenibacillales	Paenibacillaceae	
Thermobacillus	Touzel et al. 2000	Bacillota	"Bacillia"	Paenibacillales	Paenibacillaceae	
Xylanibacillus	Kukolya et al. 2018	Bacillota	"Bacillia"	Paenibacillales	"Xylanibacillaceae"	
"Ca. Reconcilbacillus"	Kolinko et al. 2019	Bacillota	"Bacillia"	Paenibacillales	"Reconcilibacillaceae"	
"Rubeoparvulum"	Tidjani Alou et al. 2017	Bacillota	"Bacillia"	"Rubeoparvulales"	"Rubeoparvulaceae"	
Abyssicoccus	Jiang et al. 2016	Bacillota	"Bacillia"	Staphylococcales	Abyssicoccaceae	
Gemella	Berger 1960	Bacillota	"Bacillia"	Staphylococcales	Gemellaceae	
Aliicoccus	Amoozegar et al. 2014	Bacillota	"Bacillia"	Staphylococcales	Salinicoccaceae	
Corticicoccus	Li et al. 2017	Bacillota	"Bacillia"	Staphylococcales	Salinicoccaceae	
Jeotgalicoccus	Yoon et al. 2003	Bacillota	"Bacillia"	Staphylococcales	Salinicoccaceae	
Nosocomiicoccus	Morais et al. 2008	Bacillota	"Bacillia"	Staphylococcales	Salinicoccaceae	
Phocicoccus	Bello et al. 2024	Bacillota	"Bacillia"	Staphylococcales	Salinicoccaceae	
Salinicoccus	Ventosa et al. 1990	Bacillota	"Bacillia"	Staphylococcales	Salinicoccaceae	Lacicoccus Bello et al. 2024
Mammaliicoccus	Madhaiyan, Wirth & Saravanan 2020	Bacillota	"Bacillia"	Staphylococcales	Staphylococcaceae	
Macrococcoides	Bello et al. 2024	Bacillota	"Bacillia"	Staphylococcales	Staphylococcaceae	
Macrococcus	Kloos et al. 1998	Bacillota	"Bacillia"	Staphylococcales	Staphylococcaceae	
Staphylococcus	Rosenbach 1884	Bacillota	"Bacillia"	Staphylococcales	Staphylococcaceae	"Albococcus" Winslow & Rogers 1906; "Aurococcus" Winslow & Rogers 1906; "Merista" Prazmowski 1888 non van Tieghem 1884 non Cunn. 1839 non Suess 1851 non Chapuis 1875
Tepidibacillus	Slobodkina et al. 2014	Bacillota	"Bacillia"	Tepidibacillales	Tepidibacillaceae	
Vulcanibacillus	L'Haridon et al. 2006	Bacillota	"Bacillia"	Tepidibacillales	Tepidibacillaceae	
"Haemobacillus"	Du et al. 2022	Bacillota	"Bacillia"	Thermicanales	Thermicanaceae	
Thermicanus	Gossner et al. 2000	Bacillota	"Bacillia"	Thermicanales	Thermicanaceae	
Mechercharimyces	Matsuo et al. 2006	Bacillota	"Bacillia"	Thermoactinomycetales	JANTPT01	
Desmospora	Yassin et al. 2009	Bacillota	"Bacillia"	Thermoactinomycetales	"Desmosporaceae"	
Kroppenstedtia	von Jan et al. 2011	Bacillota	"Bacillia"	Thermoactinomycetales	"Desmosporaceae"	
Marininema	Li et al. 2012	Bacillota	"Bacillia"	Thermoactinomycetales	"Desmosporaceae"	
Marinithermofilum	Zhang et al. 2015	Bacillota	"Bacillia"	Thermoactinomycetales	"Desmosporaceae"	
Melghirimyces	Addou et al. 2012	Bacillota	"Bacillia"	Thermoactinomycetales	"Desmosporaceae"	
Paludifilum	Frikha-Dammak et al. 2016	Bacillota	"Bacillia"	Thermoactinomycetales	"Desmosporaceae"	
Novibacillus	Yang, Chen & Zhou 2015	Bacillota	"Bacillia"	Thermoactinomycetales	Novibacillaceae	
"Numidum"	Tidjani Alou et al. 2016	Bacillota	"Bacillia"	Thermoactinomycetales	Novibacillaceae	
Planifilum	Hatayama et al. 2005	Bacillota	"Bacillia"	Thermoactinomycetales	"Planifilaceae"	
Polycladomyces	Tsubouchi et al. 2013	Bacillota	"Bacillia"	Thermoactinomycetales	"Polycladomycesaceae"	
Baia	Guan et al. 2015	Bacillota	"Bacillia"	Thermoactinomycetales	Thermoactinomycetaceae	Croceifilum Hatayama & Kuno 2015
Geothermomicrobium	Zhou et al. 2014	Bacillota	"Bacillia"	Thermoactinomycetales	Thermoactinomycetaceae	
Hazenella	Buss et al. 2013	Bacillota	"Bacillia"	Thermoactinomycetales	Thermoactinomycetaceae	
Laceyella	Yoon et al. 2005	Bacillota	"Bacillia"	Thermoactinomycetales	Thermoactinomycetaceae	
Lihuaxuella	Yu et al. 2013	Bacillota	"Bacillia"	Thermoactinomycetales	Thermoactinomycetaceae	
Paenactinomyces	Jiang et al. 2019	Bacillota	"Bacillia"	Thermoactinomycetales	Thermoactinomycetaceae	
Polycladospora	Mo et al. 2023	Bacillota	"Bacillia"	Thermoactinomycetales	Thermoactinomycetaceae	
Risungbinella	Kim et al. 2015	Bacillota	"Bacillia"	Thermoactinomycetales	Thermoactinomycetaceae	
Salinithrix	Zarparvar et al. 2014	Bacillota	"Bacillia"	Thermoactinomycetales	Thermoactinomycetaceae	
Seinonella	Yoon et al. 2005	Bacillota	"Bacillia"	Thermoactinomycetales	Thermoactinomycetaceae	
Shimazuella	Park et al. 2007	Bacillota	"Bacillia"	Thermoactinomycetales	Thermoactinomycetaceae	
Staphylospora	Wang et al. 2019	Bacillota	"Bacillia"	Thermoactinomycetales	Thermoactinomycetaceae	
Thermoactinomyces	Tsiklinsky 1899	Bacillota	"Bacillia"	Thermoactinomycetales	Thermoactinomycetaceae	
Thermoflavimicrobium	Yoon et al. 2005	Bacillota	"Bacillia"	Thermoactinomycetales	Thermoactinomycetaceae	"Actinobifida" Krasilnikov & Agre 1964
Collibacillus	Jojima et al. 2023	Bacillota	"Bacillia"	Tumebacillales	BOQE01	
Effusibacillus	Watanabe, Kojima & Fukui 2014	Bacillota	"Bacillia"	Tumebacillales	Effusibacillaceae	
Tumebacillus	Steven et al. 2008	Bacillota	"Bacillia"	Tumebacillales	Tumebacillaceae	
"Ca. Caenarcanum"	Soo et al. 2014	"Cyanobacteria"	"Vampirovibrionia"	"Caenarcanales"	"Caenarcanaceae"	
"Ca. Adamsella"	Glendinning et al. 2020	"Cyanobacteria"	"Vampirovibrionia"	"Gastranaerophilales"	"Adamsellaceae"	
"Ca. Avigastranaerophilus"	Gilroy et al. 2021	"Cyanobacteria"	"Vampirovibrionia"	"Gastranaerophilales"	"Gastranaerophilaceae"	
"Ca. Galligastranaerophilus"	Gilroy et al. 2021	"Cyanobacteria"	"Vampirovibrionia"	"Gastranaerophilales"	"Gastranaerophilaceae"	
"Ca. Gastranaerophilus"	Soo et al. 2014	"Cyanobacteria"	"Vampirovibrionia"	"Gastranaerophilales"	"Gastranaerophilaceae"	
"Ca. Limenecus"	Gilroy et al. 2021	"Cyanobacteria"	"Vampirovibrionia"	"Gastranaerophilales"	"Gastranaerophilaceae"	
"Ca. Scatenecus"	Gilroy et al. 2021	"Cyanobacteria"	"Vampirovibrionia"	"Gastranaerophilales"	"Gastranaerophilaceae"	
"Ca. Scatousia"	Gilroy et al. 2021	"Cyanobacteria"	"Vampirovibrionia"	"Gastranaerophilales"	"Gastranaerophilaceae"	
"Ca. Spyradomonas"	Gilroy et al. 2021	"Cyanobacteria"	"Vampirovibrionia"	"Gastranaerophilales"	"Gastranaerophilaceae"	
"Ca. Stercorousia"	Gilroy et al. 2021	"Cyanobacteria"	"Vampirovibrionia"	"Gastranaerophilales"	"Gastranaerophilaceae"	
"Ca. Obscuribacter"	Soo et al. 2014	"Cyanobacteria"	"Vampirovibrionia"	"Obscuribacterales"	"Obscuribacteraceae"	
"Psychrobscuribacter"	Tan et al. 2026	"Cyanobacteria"	"Vampirovibrionia"	"Obscuribacterales"	"Obscuribacteraceae"	
"Ca. Neutrinobacter"	Tarasov et al. 2026	"Cyanobacteria"	"Vampirovibrionia"	Vampirovibrionales	Vampirovibrionaceae	
Vampirovibrio	Gromov & Mamkayeva 1972 ex Gromov & Mamkaeva 1980	"Cyanobacteria"	"Vampirovibrionia"	Vampirovibrionales	Vampirovibrionaceae	
Carboxydocella	Sokolova et al. 2002	"Desulfotomaculota"	"Carboxydocellia"	Carboxydocellales	Carboxydocellaceae	
Carboxydothermus	Svetlichny et al. 1991	"Desulfotomaculota"	"Carboxydothermia"	Carboxydothermales	Carboxydothermaceae	Thermoterrabacterium Slobodkin et al. 1997
"Ca. Avidehalobacter"	Gilroy et al. 2021	"Desulfotomaculota"	"Dehalobacteriia"	"Avidehalobacterales"	"Avidehalobacteraceae"	
"Ca. Cryptoclostridium"	Glendinning et al. 2020	"Desulfotomaculota"	"Dehalobacteriia"	"Cryptoclostridiales"	"Cryptoclostridiaceae"	
"Dehalobacterium"	Magli, Wendt & Leisinger 1996	"Desulfotomaculota"	"Dehalobacteriia"	"Dehalobacteriales"	"Dehalobacteriaceae"	
"Ca. Formicimonas"	corrig. Holland et al. 2021	"Desulfotomaculota"	"Dehalobacteriia"	"Dehalobacteriales"	"Dehalobacteriaceae"	
Desulfitispora	Sorokin & Muyzer 2010	"Desulfotomaculota"	Desulfitisporia	Desulfitisporales	Desulfitisporaceae	
Acididesulfobacillus	Sánchez-Andrea et al. 2023	"Desulfotomaculota"	"Desulfitobacteriia"	"Desulfitobacteriales"	Desulfitobacteriaceae	
Desulfitobacterium	Utkin, Woese & Wiegel 1994	"Desulfotomaculota"	"Desulfitobacteriia"	"Desulfitobacteriales"	Desulfitobacteriaceae	
Desulfosporosinus	Stackebrandt et al. 1997	"Desulfotomaculota"	"Desulfitobacteriia"	"Desulfitobacteriales"	Desulfitobacteriaceae	
Paradesulfitobacterium	Li et al. 2021	"Desulfotomaculota"	"Desulfitobacteriia"	"Desulfitobacteriales"	Desulfitobacteriaceae	
Dehalobacter	Holliger et al. 1998	"Desulfotomaculota"	"Desulfitobacteriia"	"Desulfitobacteriales"	Gracilibacteraceae	
"Ca. Dichloromethanomonas"	Kleindienst et al. 2017	"Desulfotomaculota"	"Desulfitobacteriia"	"Desulfitobacteriales"	Gracilibacteraceae	
Gracilibacter	Lee et al. 2006	"Desulfotomaculota"	"Desulfitobacteriia"	"Desulfitobacteriales"	Gracilibacteraceae	
Syntrophobotulus	Friedrich et al. 1996	"Desulfotomaculota"	"Desulfitobacteriia"	"Desulfitobacteriales"	Gracilibacteraceae	
Heliobacterium	Gest & Favinger 1985	"Desulfotomaculota"	"Desulfitobacteriia"	"Heliobacteriales"	Heliobacteriaceae	Heliobacillus Beer-Romero & Gest 1998
"Ca. Helioclostridium"	Girija, Sasikala & Ramana 2006	"Desulfotomaculota"	"Desulfitobacteriia"	"Heliobacteriales"	Heliobacteriaceae	
Heliomicrobium	Kyndt et al. 2021	"Desulfotomaculota"	"Desulfitobacteriia"	"Heliobacteriales"	Heliobacteriaceae	
"Ca. Heliomonas"	Asao, Takaichi & Madigan 2012	"Desulfotomaculota"	"Desulfitobacteriia"	"Heliobacteriales"	Heliobacteriaceae	
Heliophilum	Ormerod et al. 1996	"Desulfotomaculota"	"Desulfitobacteriia"	"Heliobacteriales"	Heliobacteriaceae	
Heliorestis	Bryantseva et al. 2000	"Desulfotomaculota"	"Desulfitobacteriia"	"Heliobacteriales"	Heliobacteriaceae	
Ammonifex	Huber & Stetter 1996	"Desulfotomaculota"	Desulfotomaculia	Desulfotomaculales	Ammonificaceae	
Desulfothermobacter	Frolov et al. 2018	"Desulfotomaculota"	Desulfotomaculia	Desulfotomaculales	Ammonificaceae	
Thermodesulfitimonas	Slobodkina et al. 2017	"Desulfotomaculota"	Desulfotomaculia	Desulfotomaculales	Ammonificaceae	
Desulfoscipio	Watanabe, Fukui & Kuever 2021	"Desulfotomaculota"	Desulfotomaculia	Desulfotomaculales	Desulfallantaceae	
Desulfotruncus	Watanabe, Fukui & Kuever 2021	"Desulfotomaculota"	Desulfotomaculia	Desulfotomaculales	Desulfallantaceae	
Sporotomaculum	Brauman et al. 1998	"Desulfotomaculota"	Desulfotomaculia	Desulfotomaculales	Desulfallantaceae	Desulfallas Watanabe, Kojima & Fukui 2018
Desulfofarcimen	Watanabe, Kojima & Fukui 2018	"Desulfotomaculota"	Desulfotomaculia	Desulfotomaculales	Desulfofarciminaceae	
Desulfolucanica	corrig. Watanabe, Fukui & Kuever 2021	"Desulfotomaculota"	Desulfotomaculia	Desulfotomaculales	Desulfofarciminaceae	
Desulfocucumis	Watanabe, Kojima & Fukui 2017	"Desulfotomaculota"	Desulfotomaculia	Desulfotomaculales	Desulfocucumeraceae	
Desulfofalx	Watanabe, Fukui & Kuever 2021	"Desulfotomaculota"	Desulfotomaculia	Desulfotomaculales	"Desulfohalotomaculaceae"	
Desulfohalotomaculum	Watanabe, Kojima & Fukui 2018	"Desulfotomaculota"	Desulfotomaculia	Desulfotomaculales	"Desulfohalotomaculaceae"	
Desulforadius	Watanabe, Fukui & Kuever 2021	"Desulfotomaculota"	Desulfotomaculia	Desulfotomaculales	"Desulfohalotomaculaceae"	
Desulfovectis	Watanabe, Fukui & Kuever 2021	"Desulfotomaculota"	Desulfotomaculia	Desulfotomaculales	"Desulfohalotomaculaceae"	
"Ca. Desulfopertinax"	Jungbluth et al. 2015	"Desulfotomaculota"	Desulfotomaculia	Desulfotomaculales	Desulforudaceae	
Desulforudis	Karnachuk et al. 2026	"Desulfotomaculota"	Desulfotomaculia	Desulfotomaculales	Desulforudaceae	
Desulfotomaculum	Campbell & Postgate 1965	"Desulfotomaculota"	Desulfotomaculia	Desulfotomaculales	Desulfotomaculaceae	Desulforamulus Watanabe, Fukui & Kuever 2021
Desulfofundulus	Watanabe, Kojima & Fukui 2018	"Desulfotomaculota"	Desulfotomaculia	Desulfotomaculales	Desulfovirgulaceae	
Desulfovirgula	Kaksonen et al. 2007	"Desulfotomaculota"	Desulfotomaculia	Desulfotomaculales	Desulfovirgulaceae	
Desulfurispora	Kaksonen et al. 2007	"Desulfotomaculota"	Desulfotomaculia	Desulfotomaculales	Desulfurisporaceae	
Cryptanaerobacter	Juteau et al. 2005	"Desulfotomaculota"	Desulfotomaculia	Desulfotomaculales	Pelotomaculaceae	
Pelotomaculum	Imachi et al. 2002	"Desulfotomaculota"	Desulfotomaculia	Desulfotomaculales	Pelotomaculaceae	
"Propionivorax"	Hao et al. 2020	"Desulfotomaculota"	Desulfotomaculia	Desulfotomaculales	Pelotomaculaceae	
"Ca. Syntrophopropionicum"	Singh, Schnurer & Westerholm 2021	"Desulfotomaculota"	Desulfotomaculia	Desulfotomaculales	Pelotomaculaceae	
"Ca. Thermosyntrophopropionicum"	Singh et al. 2023	"Desulfotomaculota"	Desulfotomaculia	Desulfotomaculales	Pelotomaculaceae	
Desulfitibacter	Nielsen, Kjeldsen & Ingvorsen 2006	"Desulfotomaculota"	DSM-16504	Desulfitibacterales	Desulfitibacteraceae	
Zhaonella	Lv et al. 2020	"Desulfotomaculota"	DUOV01	DUOV01	Zhaonellaceae	
"Metallumcola"	Hsu et al. 2024	"Desulfotomaculota"	JADQBR01	JADQBR01	JADQBR01	
Calderihabitans	Yoneda et al. 2013	"Desulfotomaculota"	KKC1	Calderihabitantales	Calderihabitantaceae	
Neomoorella	Gtari & Ventura 2025	"Desulfotomaculota"	"Moorellia"	Neomoorellales	Moorellaceae	Moorella Collins et al. 1994 non Rao & Rao 1964 non Cameron 1913
Thermanaeromonas	Mori et al. 2002	"Desulfotomaculota"	"Moorellia"	Neomoorellales	Moorellaceae	
Syntrophaceticus	Westerholm, Roos & Schnurer 2011	"Desulfotomaculota"	"Thermacetogeniia"	Thermacetogeniales	Thermacetogeniaceae	
Thermacetogenium	Hattori et al. 2000	"Desulfotomaculota"	"Thermacetogeniia"	Thermacetogeniales	Thermacetogeniaceae	
"Ca. Thermosyntrophaceticus"	Cheng, Bongcam-Rudloff & Schnurer 2025	"Desulfotomaculota"	"Thermacetogeniia"	Thermacetogeniales	Thermacetogeniaceae	
Desulfonispora	Denger, Stackebrandt & Cook 1999	"Desulfotomaculota"	Peptococcia	Peptococcales	Desulfonisporaceae	
Peptococcus	Kluyver & van Niel 1936	"Desulfotomaculota"	Peptococcia	Peptococcales	Peptococcaceae	
Thermanaerosceptrum	corrig. Hamilton-Brehm et al. 2021	"Desulfotomaculota"	Peptococcia	"Thermanaerosceptrales"	"Thermanaerosceptraceae"	
"Ca. Syntrophobaca"	Sorokin et al. 2016	"Desulfotomaculota"	Syntrophomonadia	Syntrophomonadales	Syntrophomonadaceae	
"Ca. Syntrophocurvum"	Sorokin et al. 2016	"Desulfotomaculota"	Syntrophomonadia	Syntrophomonadales	Syntrophomonadaceae	
"Ca. Syntropholuna"	Sorokin et al. 2016	"Desulfotomaculota"	Syntrophomonadia	Syntrophomonadales	Syntrophomonadaceae	
Syntrophomonas	McInerney et al. 1982	"Desulfotomaculota"	Syntrophomonadia	Syntrophomonadales	Syntrophomonadaceae	Pelospora Matthies et al. 2000; Syntrophospora Zhao et al. 1990
"Ca. Syntrophonatronum"	Sorokin et al. 2016	"Desulfotomaculota"	Syntrophomonadia	Syntrophomonadales	Syntrophomonadaceae	
Thermosyntropha	Svetlitshnyi, Rainey & Wiegel 1996	"Desulfotomaculota"	Syntrophomonadia	Syntrophomonadales	Syntrophomonadaceae	
"Ca. Thermosyntrophomonas"	Cheng, Bongcam-Rudloff & Schnurer 2025	"Desulfotomaculota"	Syntrophomonadia	Syntrophomonadales	Syntrophomonadaceae	
Syntrophothermus	Sekiguchi et al. 2000	"Desulfotomaculota"	Syntrophomonadia	Syntrophomonadales	Syntrophothermaceae	
Phosphitispora	Mao et al. 2021	"Desulfotomaculota"	Thermincolia	Thermincolales	UBA2595	
Thermincola	Sokolova et al. 2005	"Desulfotomaculota"	Thermincolia	Thermincolales	Thermincolaceae	
Anoxybacter	Zeng et al. 2015	"Halanaerobiota"	"Halanaerobiia"	"Anoxybacterales"	"Anoxybacteraceae"	
"Ca. Natronospora"	Sorokin, Merkel & Khizhniak 2025	"Halanaerobiota"	"Halanaerobiia"	Halanaerobiales		
Iocasia	Zhang et al. 2025	"Halanaerobiota"	"Halanaerobiia"	Halanaerobiales	DTU029	
Halarsenatibacter	Switzer Blum et al. 2010	"Halanaerobiota"	"Halanaerobiia"	Halanaerobiales	Halarsenatibacteraceae	
Halonatronomonas	Detkova, Boltyanskaya & Kevbrin 2023	"Halanaerobiota"	"Halanaerobiia"	Halanaerobiales	Halarsenatibacteraceae	
Halocella	corrig. Simankova et al. 1994 non Borgert 1907	"Halanaerobiota"	"Halanaerobiia"	Halanaerobiales	Halothermotrichaceae	
Halothermothrix	Cayol et al. 1994	"Halanaerobiota"	"Halanaerobiia"	Halanaerobiales	Halothermotrichaceae	
Halanaerobium	corrig. Zeikus et al. 1984	"Halanaerobiota"	"Halanaerobiia"	Halanaerobiales	Halanaerobiaceae	Haloincola Zhilina et al. 1992
Acetohalobium	Zhilina & Zavarzin 1990	"Halanaerobiota"	"Halanaerobiia"	Halobacteroidales	Acetohalobiaceae	
"Ca. Frackibacter"	Daly et al. 2016	"Halanaerobiota"	"Halanaerobiia"	Halobacteroidales	Acetohalobiaceae	
Fuchsiella	Zhilina et al. 2012	"Halanaerobiota"	"Halanaerobiia"	Halobacteroidales	Acetohalobiaceae	
Selenihalanaerobacter	Switzer Blum et al. 2001	"Halanaerobiota"	"Halanaerobiia"	Halobacteroidales	Acetohalobiaceae	
Sporohalobacter	Oren et al. 1988	"Halanaerobiota"	"Halanaerobiia"	Halobacteroidales	Acetohalobiaceae	
Halanaerobaculum	Hedi et al. 2009	"Halanaerobiota"	"Halanaerobiia"	Halobacteroidales	Halobacteroidaceae	
Halanaerobacter	corrig. Liaw & Mah 1996	"Halanaerobiota"	"Halanaerobiia"	Halobacteroidales	Halobacteroidaceae	
Gales et al. 2025	"Halanaerobiota"	"Halanaerobiia"	Halobacteroidales	Halobacteroidaceae		
Halobacteroides	Oren et al. 1984	"Halanaerobiota"	"Halanaerobiia"	Halobacteroidales	Halobacteroidaceae	
Halonatronum	Zhilina et al. 2001	"Halanaerobiota"	"Halanaerobiia"	Halobacteroidales	Halobacteroidaceae	
Natroniella	Zhilina et al. 1996	"Halanaerobiota"	"Halanaerobiia"	Halobacteroidales	Halobacteroidaceae	
Orenia	Rainey & Stackebrandt 1995	"Halanaerobiota"	"Halanaerobiia"	Halobacteroidales	Halobacteroidaceae	
Pelosinus	Shelobolina et al. 2007	"Selenobacteria"	"Selenomonadia"	DSM-13327	"Pelosinaceae"	Sporotalea Boga et al. 2007
Anaerosinus	Strompl et al. 1999	"Selenobacteria"	"Selenomonadia"	ICN-92133	ICN-92133	Selenobaculum Yeo et al. 2023
"Massilibacillus"	Tidjani Alou et al. 2017	"Selenobacteria"	"Selenomonadia"	FLKF01	"Massilibacillaceae"	
"Azotosporobacter"	Xie et al. 2024	"Selenobacteria"	"Selenomonadia"	SG130	SG130	
Pelorhabdus	Grässle et al. 2021	"Selenobacteria"	"Selenomonadia"	UMGS1260	UMGS1260	
Acidaminococcus	Rogosa 1969	"Selenobacteria"	"Selenomonadia"	Acidaminococcales	Acidaminococcaceae	
"Ca. Avacidaminococcus"	Gilroy et al. 2021	"Selenobacteria"	"Selenomonadia"	Acidaminococcales	Acidaminococcaceae	
Phascolarctobacterium	Del Dot et al. 1994	"Selenobacteria"	"Selenomonadia"	Acidaminococcales	Acidaminococcaceae	
Succiniclasticum	van Gylswyk 1995	"Selenobacteria"	"Selenomonadia"	Acidaminococcales	Acidaminococcaceae	
Succinispira	Janssen & O'Farrell 1999	"Selenobacteria"	"Selenomonadia"	Acidaminococcales	Succinispiraceae	
Anaeromusa	Baena et al. 1999	"Selenobacteria"	"Selenomonadia"	Anaeromusales	Anaeromusaceae	Anaeroarcus corrig. Strompl et al. 1999
Dendrosporobacter	Strompl et al. 2000	"Selenobacteria"	"Selenomonadia"	"Dendrosporobacterales"	Dendrosporobacteraceae	
"Desulfosporomusa"	Sass et al. 2004	"Selenobacteria"	"Selenomonadia"	Propionisporales	Propionisporaceae	
Propionispora	Biebl et al. 2001	"Selenobacteria"	"Selenomonadia"	Propionisporales	Propionisporaceae	
"Psychrosinus"	Sattley et al. 2008	"Selenobacteria"	"Selenomonadia"	Propionisporales	Propionisporaceae	
Anaerovibrio	Hungate 1966	"Selenobacteria"	"Selenomonadia"	Selenomonadales	Selenomonadaceae	
Centipeda	Lai et al. 1983 non Loureiro 1790	"Selenobacteria"	"Selenomonadia"	Selenomonadales	Selenomonadaceae	
"Dighea"	Heng & Kittelmann 2026	"Selenobacteria"	"Selenomonadia"	Selenomonadales	Selenomonadaceae	
Dongibacter	Heng & Kittelmann 2026	"Selenobacteria"	"Selenomonadia"	Selenomonadales	Selenomonadaceae	
Megamonas	Shah & Collins 1983	"Selenobacteria"	"Selenomonadia"	Selenomonadales	Selenomonadaceae	
Mitsuokella	Shah & Collins 1983	"Selenobacteria"	"Selenomonadia"	Selenomonadales	Selenomonadaceae	
Pectinatus	Lee et al. 1978	"Selenobacteria"	"Selenomonadia"	Selenomonadales	Selenomonadaceae	
Propionispira	Schink et al. 1983	"Selenobacteria"	"Selenomonadia"	Selenomonadales	Selenomonadaceae	Zymophilus Schleifer et al. 1990
Pseudoselenomonas	Heng & Kittelmann 2026	"Selenobacteria"	"Selenomonadia"	Selenomonadales	Selenomonadaceae	"Selenomastix" Woodcock & Lapage 1913; Wylensekiella Heng & Kittelmann 2026
Quinella	Krumholz et al. 1993	"Selenobacteria"	"Selenomonadia"	Selenomonadales	Selenomonadaceae	Quin's oval
Schleiferibacter	Heng & Kittelmann 2026	"Selenobacteria"	"Selenomonadia"	Selenomonadales	Selenomonadaceae	
Schwartzia	van Gylswyk et al. 1997 non de Conceição Vellozo 1825 non Bucquoy, Dautzenberg & Dollfus 1884 non Blandin 1988	"Selenobacteria"	"Selenomonadia"	Selenomonadales	Selenomonadaceae	
Selenomonas	von Prowazek 1913	"Selenobacteria"	"Selenomonadia"	Selenomonadales	Selenomonadaceae	
Anaerospora	Woo et al. 2016	"Selenobacteria"	"Selenomonadia"	"Sporomusales"	DSM-15969	
"Anaeroselena"	Prokofeva et al. 2025	"Selenobacteria"	"Selenomonadia"	"Sporomusales"	UBA7701	
Acetonema	Kane & Breznak 1992	"Selenobacteria"	"Selenomonadia"	"Sporomusales"	Acetonemataceae	
Anaerosporomusa	Choi et al. 2016	"Selenobacteria"	"Selenomonadia"	"Sporomusales"	Acetonemataceae	
Allolucifera	Deshmukh et al. 2026	"Selenobacteria"	"Selenomonadia"	"Sporomusales"	"Luciferaceae"	"Lucifera" Sanchez-Andrea et al. 2018
Thermosinus	Sokolova et al. 2004	"Selenobacteria"	"Selenomonadia"	"Sporomusales"	Thermosinaceae	Sporolituus Ogg & Patel 2009
Methylomusa	Amano et al. 2018	"Selenobacteria"	"Selenomonadia"	"Sporomusales"	Sporomusaceae	
Sporomusa	Moller et al. 1985	"Selenobacteria"	"Selenomonadia"	"Sporomusales"	Sporomusaceae	
Dialister	Bergey et al. 1923 ex Moore & Moore 1994	"Selenobacteria"	"Selenomonadia"	Veillonellales	Dialisteraceae	Allisonella Garner et al. 2003
Megasphaera	Rogosa 1971	"Selenobacteria"	"Selenomonadia"	Veillonellales	Megasphaeraceae	Anaeroglobus Carlier et al. 2002; "Caecibacter" Ricaboni et al. 2017; "Colibacter" Mailhe et al. 2017
Negativicoccus	Marchandin et al. 2010	"Selenobacteria"	"Selenomonadia"	Veillonellales	Negativicoccaceae	
Veillonella	Prevot 1933	"Selenobacteria"	"Selenomonadia"	Veillonellales	Veillonellaceae	"Syzygiococcus" Herzberg 1928

Notes: List of clades needed to be added:

- Actinomycetota > Actinomycetia > Actinobacteridae
- Bacteroidota > Bacteroidia
- Cyanobacteriota > Cyanobacteria
- Pseudomonadota (Proteobacteria s.s.) > "Caulobacteria", "Pseudomonadia"

== See also ==
- Branching order of bacterial phyla (Woese, 1987)
- Branching order of bacterial phyla (Gupta, 2001)
- Branching order of bacterial phyla (Cavalier-Smith, 2002)
- Branching order of bacterial phyla (Rappe and Giovanoni, 2003)
- Branching order of bacterial phyla (Battistuzzi et al., 2004)
- Branching order of bacterial phyla (Ciccarelli et al., 2006)
- Branching order of bacterial phyla after ARB Silva Living Tree
- Branching order of bacterial phyla (Genome Taxonomy Database, 2018)
- Bacterial phyla
- List of Archaea genera
- List of bacterial orders
- LPSN, list of accepted bacterial and archaeal names
- Human microbiome project
- Microorganism
