= Syntrophobacter wolinii =

Scientific classification
- Domain: Bacteria
- Kingdom: Pseudomonadati
- Phylum: Thermodesulfobacteriota
- Class: Deltaproteobacteria
- Order: Syntrophobacterales
- Family: Syntrophobacteraceae
- Genus: Syntrophobacter
- Species: S. wolinii

Binomial name
- Syntrophobacter wolinii Boone & Bryant, 1980

Species of bacterium

Syntrophobacter wolinii is a non-motile, gram-negative and rod-shaped species of bacteria that was originally isolated from a wastewater digester. This species is able to perform propionate degradation and sulfate reduction. S. wolinii can be grown in co-culture or pure culture. 16s rRNA analysis shows its close relation to other sulfate reducers.

== Metabolism ==
Propionate is an intermediate in the process of methane production in sewage digesters, the main environment in which this species has been isolated from. S. wolinii degrades propionate via the methylmalonyl-CoA pathway, resulting in the production of acetate, CO_{2} and H_{2}. This process is energetically favorable only under low partial pressure of H_{2} gas, specifically below 10^{−5} atm. At high partial pressures of oxygen, the reaction is endergonic (ΔG° = +76.0 kJ). When H_{2} partial pressures are constrained by methanogenesis or sulfate-reduction, the reaction is exergonic (ΔG° = - 26.5 kJ). S. wolinii can use additional substrates such as pyruvate and fumarate in place of propionate. Reduction of sulfate to sulfite and methylation of Hg(II) have also been observed by the bacterium.

== Cultures ==
Syntrophobacter wolinii has been repeatedly grown in co-culture with sulfate-reducing Desulfovibrio sp. and methanogen Methanospirillum hungateii. Isolation in pure culture has been successful with propionate and sulfate together or pyruvate alone. S. wolinii optimum growth occurs when kept near neutral pH, yet has been observed to tolerate a pH of 6.1. Growth of this microbe appears to be sensitive to salinity, and is stunted at NaCl concentrations of 86 mM.

== Phylogeny ==
16s rRNA analysis indicates that S. wolinii is closely related to Desulfomonile tiedjei and Desulfoarculus baarsi. All three of these microbes can perform sulfate reduction.
