= Smithella propionica =

Scientific classification
- Domain: Bacteria
- Kingdom: Pseudomonadati
- Phylum: Thermodesulfobacteriota
- Class: Syntrophia
- Order: Syntrophales
- Family: Syntrophaceae
- Genus: Smithella
- Species: S. propionica

Binomial name
- Smithella propionica Liu et al. 1999

Species of bacterium

Smithella propionica is a species of bacteria, the type species of its genus. It is anaerobic, syntrophic, propionate-oxidizing bacteria, with type strain LYP^{T} (= OCM 661^{T}).
