= Desulfacinum infernum =

Scientific classification
- Domain: Bacteria
- Kingdom: Pseudomonadati
- Phylum: Thermodesulfobacteriota
- Class: Syntrophobacteria
- Order: Syntrophobacterales
- Family: Syntrophobacteraceae
- Genus: Desulfacinum
- Species: D. infernum

Binomial name
- Desulfacinum infernum Rees et al. 1995

Species of bacterium

Desulfacinum infernum is a thermophilic sulfate-reducing bacterium, the type species of its genus. Its cells are oval, 1.5 by 2.5-3μm, non-motile and gram-negative.
