= Desulfacinum hydrothermale =

Scientific classification
- Domain: Bacteria
- Kingdom: Pseudomonadati
- Phylum: Thermodesulfobacteriota
- Class: Syntrophobacteria
- Order: Syntrophobacterales
- Family: Syntrophobacteraceae
- Genus: Desulfacinum
- Species: D. hydrothermale

Binomial name
- Desulfacinum hydrothermale Sievert and Kuever 2000

Species of bacterium

Desulfacinum hydrothermale is a thermophilic sulfate-reducing bacterium. Its cells are oval-shaped, 0.8–1 μm in width and 1.5–2.5 μm in length, motile and Gram-negative. The type of strain is MT-96^{T} (=DSM 13146).
