= Syntrophus aciditrophicus =

Scientific classification
- Domain: Bacteria
- Kingdom: Pseudomonadati
- Phylum: Thermodesulfobacteriota
- Class: Syntrophia
- Order: Syntrophales
- Family: Syntrophaceae
- Genus: Syntrophus
- Species: S. aciditrophicus

Binomial name
- Syntrophus aciditrophicus Jackson et al. 2001

Species of bacterium

Syntrophus aciditrophicus is a gram-negative and rod-shaped bacterium. It is non-motile, non-spore-forming and grows under strictly anaerobic conditions, thus an obligate anaerobe. It degrades fatty acids and benzoate in syntrophic association with hydrogen-using microorganisms. Its genome was published in 2007.
