= Syntrophus buswellii =

Scientific classification
- Domain: Bacteria
- Kingdom: Pseudomonadati
- Phylum: Thermodesulfobacteriota
- Class: Syntrophia
- Order: Syntrophales
- Family: Syntrophaceae
- Genus: Syntrophus
- Species: S. buswellii

Binomial name
- Syntrophus buswellii Mountfort et al. 1984

Species of bacterium

Syntrophus buswellii is a bacterium. It is a motile, gram-negative, anaerobic rod-shaped organism which catabolises benzoate.
