= Syntrophobacter sulfatireducens =

Scientific classification
- Domain: Bacteria
- Kingdom: Pseudomonadati
- Phylum: Thermodesulfobacteriota
- Class: Syntrophobacteria
- Order: Syntrophobacterales
- Family: Syntrophobacteraceae
- Genus: Syntrophobacter
- Species: S. sulfatireducens

Binomial name
- Syntrophobacter sulfatireducens Chen, Liu & Dong, 2005

Species of bacterium

Syntrophobacter sulfatireducens is a species of bacteria notable for degrading propionate. It is notable for being syntrophic and for oxidising propionate. Its cells are egg-shaped. TB8106T (=AS 1.5016T=DSM 16706T) is its type strain.
