= Syntrophobacter pfennigii =

Scientific classification
- Domain: Bacteria
- Kingdom: Pseudomonadati
- Phylum: Thermodesulfobacteriota
- Class: Syntrophobacteria
- Order: Syntrophobacterales
- Family: Syntrophobacteraceae
- Genus: Syntrophobacter
- Species: S. pfennigii

Binomial name
- Syntrophobacter pfennigii Wallrabenstein et al. 1996

Species of bacterium

Syntrophobacter pfennigii is a species of syntrophic propionate-oxidising anaerobic bacterium. Strain KoProp1 is the type strain.
