= Syntrophobacter fumaroxidans =

Scientific classification
- Domain: Bacteria
- Kingdom: Pseudomonadati
- Phylum: Thermodesulfobacteriota
- Class: Syntrophobacteria
- Order: Syntrophobacterales
- Family: Syntrophobacteraceae
- Genus: Syntrophobacter
- Species: S. fumaroxidans

Binomial name
- Syntrophobacter fumaroxidans Harmsen et al. 1998

Species of bacterium

Syntrophobacter fumaroxidans is a species of syntrophic propionate-degrading sulfate-reducing bacterium. Strain MPOB^{T} (= DSM 10017^{T}) is the type strain. Its genome has been fully sequenced.
