= Syntrophus =

Scientific classification
- Domain: Bacteria
- Kingdom: Pseudomonadati
- Phylum: Thermodesulfobacteriota
- Class: Syntrophia
- Order: Syntrophales
- Family: Syntrophaceae
- Genus: Syntrophus; Mountfort et al. 1984

Type species
- Syntrophus buswellii Mountfort et al. 1984

Species
- S. aciditrophicus; S. buswellii; S. gentianae; "S. pelomyxae"

Genus of bacteria

Syntrophus is a Gram negative bacterial genus from the family of Syntrophaceae.

== Phylogeny ==
The currently accepted taxonomy is based on the List of Prokaryotic names with Standing in Nomenclature (LPSN) and National Center for Biotechnology Information (NCBI).

16S rRNA based LTP_10_2024

- Syntrophus
  - S. aciditrophicus Jackson et al. 2015
  - - S. buswellii Mountfort et al. 1984
    - S. gentianae Wallrabenstein et al. 1996

120 marker proteins based GTDB 10-RS226

- Syntrophus
  - S. aciditrophicus
  - S. gentianae

== See also ==
- List of bacterial orders
- List of bacteria genera
