= Desulfomonile limimaris =

Scientific classification
- Domain: Bacteria
- Kingdom: Pseudomonadati
- Phylum: Thermodesulfobacteriota
- Class: Desulfomonilia
- Order: Desulfomonilales
- Family: Desulfomonilaceae
- Genus: Desulfomonile
- Species: D. limimaris

Binomial name
- Desulfomonile limimaris Sun, Cole & Tiedje, 2001

Species of bacterium

Desulfomonile limimaris is a bacterium. It is an anaerobic dehalogenating bacterium first isolated from marine sediments. Its cells are large, Gram-negative rods with a collar girdling each cell, like Desulfomonile tiedjei. The type strain is DCB-MT (= ATCC 700979T).
