= Syntrophobacter =

Scientific classification
- Domain: Bacteria
- Kingdom: Pseudomonadati
- Phylum: Thermodesulfobacteriota
- Class: Syntrophobacteria
- Order: Syntrophobacterales
- Family: Syntrophobacteraceae
- Genus: Syntrophobacter; Boone and Bryant 1984

Type species
- Syntrophobacter wolinii Boone & Bryant 1984

Species
- S. fumaroxidans; S. pfennigii; S. sulfatireducens; S. wolinii

Genus of bacteria

Syntrophobacter is a genus of bacteria from the family Syntrophobacteraceae. Syntrophobacter have the ability to grow on propionate.

== Phylogeny ==
The currently accepted taxonomy is based on the List of Prokaryotic names with Standing in Nomenclature (LPSN) and National Center for Biotechnology Information (NCBI).

16S rRNA based LTP_10_2024

- Syntrophobacter
  - S. wolinii Boone & Bryant 1984
  - - S. fumaroxidans Harmsen et al. 1998
    - - S. pfennigii Wallrabenstein et al. 1996
      - S. sulfatireducens Chen, Liu & Dong 2005

120 marker proteins based GTDB 10-RS226

- Syntrophobacter
  S. fumaroxidans

== See also ==
- List of bacterial orders
- List of bacteria genera
