= Desulfacinum =

Scientific classification
- Domain: Bacteria
- Kingdom: Pseudomonadati
- Phylum: Thermodesulfobacteriota
- Class: Syntrophobacteria
- Order: Syntrophobacterales
- Family: Syntrophobacteraceae
- Genus: Desulfacinum; Rees et al. 1995

Type species
- Desulfacinum infernum Rees et al. 1995

Species
- D. hydrothermale; D. infernum; "D. subterraneum"

Synonyms
- Desulfoacinum

Genus of bacteria

Desulfacinum is an acetate-oxidizing bacteria genus from the family Syntrophobacteraceae.

== Phylogeny ==
The currently accepted taxonomy is based on the List of Prokaryotic names with Standing in Nomenclature (LPSN) and National Center for Biotechnology Information (NCBI).

16S rRNA based LTP_10_2024

- Desulfacinum
  - D. hydrothermale Sievert & Kuever 2000
  - D. infernum Rees et al. 1995

120 marker proteins based GTDB 10-RS226

- Desulfacinum
  - D. hydrothermale
  - D. infernum

== See also ==
- List of bacterial orders
- List of bacteria genera
