= Arsenate-reducing bacteria =

Arsenate-reducing bacteria are bacteria which reduce arsenates. Arsenate-reducing bacteria are ubiquitous in arsenic-contaminated groundwater (aqueous environment). Arsenates are salts or esters of arsenic acid (H_{3}AsO_{4}), consisting of the ion AsO^{3−}_{4}. They are moderate oxidizers that can be reduced to arsenites and to arsine. Arsenate can serve as a respiratory electron acceptor for oxidation of organic substrates and H_{2}S or H_{2}. Arsenates occur naturally in minerals such as adamite, alarsite, legrandite, and erythrite, and as hydrated or anhydrous arsenates. Arsenates are similar to phosphates since arsenic (As) and phosphorus (P) occur in group 15 (or VA) of the periodic table. Unlike phosphates, arsenates are not readily lost from minerals due to weathering. They are the predominant form of inorganic arsenic in aqueous aerobic environments. On the other hand, arsenite is more common in anaerobic environments, more mobile, and more toxic than arsenate. Arsenite is 25–60 times more toxic and more mobile than arsenate under most environmental conditions. Arsenate can lead to poisoning, since it can replace inorganic phosphate in the glyceraldehyde-3-phosphate --> 1,3-biphosphoglycerate step of glycolysis, producing 1-arseno-3-phosphoglycerate instead. Although glycolysis continues, one ATP molecule is lost. Thus, arsenate is toxic due to its ability to uncouple glycolysis. Arsenate can also inhibit pyruvate conversion into acetyl-CoA, thereby blocking the TCA cycle, resulting in additional loss of ATP.

== Niche ==
Arsenate is the major arsenic form in oxidizing environments; however, in one study, bacteria from arsenic-contaminated soil at a smelter site was able to reduce As(V) to As(III) under anaerobic conditions at arsenic concentration as high as 75 mg/L. Arsenate-respiring bacteria and Archaea have also recently been isolated from a diversity of natural environments, including freshwater streams and sediments, alkaline and saline lakes, and hot springs. However, arsenate-reducing bacteria may exist in low numbers until provided with new sources of carbon especially and possibly the selective pressure of higher concentrations of arsenic. Some common locations with arsenate reducing bacteria that is causing major contamination problems by releasing arsenic into drinking water in shallow wells include Bangladesh, the American Midwest, and the Canadian Maritime Provinces.

== Ecological importance & markers ==
Arsenic(III) fuels anoxygenic photosynthesis, such as in hot spring biofilms of Mono Lake, California. Anoxygenic photosynthesis, or photosynthesis that does not produce oxygen and is common with photosynthetic bacteria and certain cyanobacteria, uses electron donors other than water to reduce CO_{2} for incorporation into biomass. This mechanism of photoautotrophy usually uses hydrogen sulfide (H_{2}S) as an electron donor and a single photosystem as a catalyst, oxidizing sulfide to sulfur and sulfate to support the growth of phototrophs in anoxic sulfidic environments exposed to light, such as laminated microbial mats and pycnoclines of stratified lakes.

== Identification & characteristics ==
Arsenate-reducing bacteria derive their energy from reducing arsenate (As(V)) to arsenite (As(III)) via arsenate reductase enzymes. As(V) can be directly reduced to As(III) by dissimilatory arsenate reducing prokaryotes (DARPs), yielding energy to support their growth. They synthesize organic molecules by using the energy from arsenic redox reactions. The complete reduction process takes about 21 hours. Dissimilatory As(V)-respiring prokaryotes consist of a diverse phylogenetic group, including Chrysiogenes, Bacillus, Desulfomicrobium, Sulfurospirillum, Shewanella, Citrobacter, and Sulfurihydrogenibium species. Some specific species include Klebsiella oxytoca, Citrobacter freundii, and Bacillus anthracis. Although the ability to respire As(V) is spread across several phylogenetic groups, the As(V) reduction mechanism in these organisms seems to be conserved.

== Genome/Molecular composition ==
Living cells (microbial or human) are generally exposed to arsenic as arsenate or arsenite. Arsenate (As(V)) has a pK_{a} of 7.0, with HAsO^{2−}_{4} and H_{2}AsO^{−}_{4} being equally abundant at pH 7.0. Although arsenate is regarded as highly soluble, in many environments with calcium or insoluble iron compounds, arsenate is precipitated just like phosphates are. Arsenite (As(III)), has a pK_{a} of 9.3, and occurs at a neutral or acidic pH as As(OH)_{3}. Arsenite in water can be thought of as an inorganic equivalent of non-ionized glycerol and is transported across cell membranes from bacterial cells to human cells by glyceroporin membrane channel proteins.

Two enzymes are involved in two separate processes for reducing arsenate: a membrane-bound or periplasmic respiratory arsenate reductase and a cytoplasmic arsenate reductase. The anaerobic respiratory arsenate reductase reduces AsO^{3−}_{4} to As(OH)_{3}. It is a heterodimer periplasmic or membrane-associated protein consisting of a larger molybdopterin subunit (ArrA), which contains an iron–sulfur (FeS) center. This includes the FeS cofactors involved in 2-electron transfer pathways and amino acids cysteine or histidine linking the FeS cofactors to the ArrA, or HIPIP (high potential iron protein) polypeptides. It is also composed of a smaller FeS center protein ArrB. This enzyme in Gram-positive Bacillus differs from that of Gram-negative bacteria since it is anchored to the membrane of the Gram-positive cell, which lacks a periplasmic compartment.

The cytoplasmic arsenate reductase, found widely in microbes, is for intracellular defense and also reduces AsO^{3−}_{4} to As(OH)_{3} with part of the process taking place in the cytoplasm. The arsC gene occurs in ars operons for arsenic resistance in most bacteria and some archaeal genomes. It is a monomeric protein of about 135 amino acids containing 3 essential cysteine residues involved in a cascade sequence of enzyme activity. There are no cofactors in the ArsC enzyme. The first recognized cytoplasmic arsenate reductase was found on a Gram-positive Staphylococcus plasmid. The thioredoxin-coupled clade of arsenate reductases is found widely among plasmids and genomes of Gram-positive bacteria and also in some Gram-negative bacteria. The Pseudomonas aeruginosa genome has separate genes for glutaredoxin- and thioredoxin-coupled ArsC reductases. In contrast, those for cyanobacteria seem to be an unusual hybrid with strong sequence similarity to thioredoxin-dependent reductase, but functioning with glutaredoxin and glutathione instead. The cyanobacteria arsenate reductase is also a homodimer, different from other known bacterial enzymes but similar to the yeast enzyme.

== Isolation techniques ==
One study used for enrichment a sample of mud from an arsenic-contaminated gold mine in Bendigo, Victoria, Australia (pH 7.6, 2.5 mg/L arsenic). The mud was placed in anoxic minimal medium containing arsenate (5 mM) and acetate (10 mM) and the enrichment was incubated for five days. The enrichment was subcultured twice and the third transfer was serially diluted and inoculated into minimal medium containing 1.5% (w/v) Oxoid agar (Oxoid, Hants, England), arsenate (5 mM) and acetate (10 mM) in Hungate roll tubes or onto agar plates in an anaerobic chamber. Several colonies were selected, purified, and tested for their ability to respire with arsenate (5 mM) using acetate (10 mM) as the electron donor. A motile, rod-shaped bacterium was isolated and designated JMM-4.

=== Growth media & conditions ===
The anoxic minimal medium contained 20 mM NaCl, 4 mM KCl, 2.8 mM NH_{4}Cl, 1.5 mM KH_{2}PO_{4}, 0.2 mM Na_{2}SO_{4}, 2 mM MgCl_{2}, 1 mM CaCl_{2}, 0.05% NaHCO_{3}, 1 mL/L SL10 trace elements, and vitamins (Macy et al. 1989). At no time was a reducing agent added to the medium. The initial pH of the medium was 7.8. The standard anaerobic culture technique of Hungate was employed (Macy et al. 1989). All incubations were carried out at 28 °C. -->

== Phylogeny & diversity ==
Phylogenetic analysis shows that microbial arsenic metabolism probably extends back to the anoxic primordial Earth. As(V) produced by anoxygenic photosynthesis might have created niches for primordial Earth's first As(V)-respiring prokaryotes. In microbial biofilms growing on the rock surfaces of anoxic brine pools fed by hot springs containing arsenite and sulfide at high concentrations, light-dependent oxidation of arsenite (III) to arsenate (V) was discovered occurring under anoxic conditions. A pure culture of a photosynthetic bacterium grew as a photoautotroph when As(III) was used as the sole photosynthetic electron donor. The strain contained genes supposedly encoding a As(V) reductase. However, no detectable homologs of the As(III) oxidase genes of aerobic chemolithotrophs, suggesting a reverse functionality for the reductase.

== Notable species ==
In a study, a total of 9 arsenate-respiring prokaryotes have been described, 6 of which use the non-respiratory substrate lactate as the electron donor. These organisms group together phylogenetically as follows:

=== Bacteria ===
- Sulfurospirillum arsenophilum
- Sulfurospirillum barnesii
- Bacillus arsenicoselenatis str. E1H
- B. selenitireducens str. MLS10
- Desulfotomaculum auripigmentum
- Desulfomicrobium sp. str. Ben-RB
- Chrysiogenes arsenatis

=== Archaea ===
- Pyrobaculum arsenaticum
- Pyrobaculum aerophilum

== Biochemistry ==
=== Reducing process ===
Arsenic occurs in nature in three oxidation states: As(V) (arsenate), As(III) (arsenite), and As(−3) (arsine). Although transfers between these states can be achieved by purely chemical means, microorganisms can also mediate a diversity of reactions including reduction, oxidation, and methylation. Some bacteria obtain energy by oxidizing various reduced substrates while reducing arsenates to form arsenites. The enzymes involved are known as arsenate reductases.

In 2008, bacteria were discovered that employ a version of photosynthesis with arsenites as electron donors, producing arsenates (analogous to PSII in oxygenic photosynthesis uses water as electron donor, producing molecular oxygen). The researchers conjectured that historically these photosynthesizing organisms produced the arsenates that allowed the arsenate-reducing bacteria to thrive.

=== Mechanism ===
In Desulfomicrobium strain Ben-RB arsenate is reduced by a membrane-bound enzyme that is either a c-type cytochrome or is associated with such a cytochrome; benzyl-viologen-dependent arsenate reductase activity was greater in cells grown with arsenate/sulfate than in cells grown with sulfate only. It appears that arsenate reduction by the Desulfovibrio strain Ben-RA is catalyzed by an arsenate reductase that is encoded by a chromosomally-borne gene shown to be homologous to the arsC gene of the Escherichia coli plasmid, R773 ars system.

== Contamination ==
Arsenic poisoning of groundwater used for drinking and irrigation is a global issue, with the risk of harmful human exposure occurring at numerous locations across the Americas, Asia, and also central Europe. Many recent studies have reported arsenic-enriched groundwater within the Ganges-Brahmaputra-Meghna Delta, with more than 35 million people at risk of arsenic poisoning in Bangladesh alone. The weathering of arsenic-rich minerals prevalent in the Himalayas and their gradual transport and deposition in the alluvial deltas below, followed by microbially mediated arsenic solubilization, are thought to be major mechanisms of arsenic mobilization into aquifers within the region. Conditions similarly conducive to the development of arsenic-enriched groundwater are thought to be present within the Red River and Mekong River deltas of Southeast Asia, where elevated concentrations of arsenic have also been reported.

== Uses ==
Microbial metabolism undoubtedly worsens environmental arsenic problems by releasing arsenite into drinking water, including shallow wells. Understanding the mechanisms can help minimize the impact. It is proposed that microbial anaerobic respiratory arsenate reductase releases previously immobilized sub-surface As(V) into water in newly drilled wells. It is possible that microbial metabolism (arsenite oxidase coupled with precipitation in mineral deposits) can be harnessed for practical bioremediation of wastewater or drinking water contaminated with arsenic. However, this prospect is just beginning to be recognized and no sustained efforts in this direction have been made. Microbial batch reactors to remove arsenic by oxidation of As(III) to As(V) and the use of bacterial arsenate reductase genes in transgenic plants for potential phytoremediation by intracellular sequestration after reduction from As(V) to As(III) have been recently reported.
