= Dissulfuribacterales =

Scientific classification
- Domain: Bacteria
- Kingdom: Pseudomonadati
- Phylum: Thermodesulfobacteriota
- Class: Dissulfuribacteria
- Order: Dissulfuribacterales; Waite et al. 2020

Families
- Dissulfuribacteraceae; "Dissulfurirhabdaceae"

Order of bacteria

The Dissulfuribacterales are an order of anaerobic chemolithoautotrophic bacteria within Dissulfuribacteria, Desulfobacterota. The only described member species is Dissulfuribacter thermophilus.

== Phylogeny ==
The currently accepted taxonomy is based on the List of Prokaryotic names with Standing in Nomenclature (LPSN) and National Center for Biotechnology Information (NCBI).

120 marker proteins based GTDB 10-RS226

- Dissulfuribacterales
  - - Dissulfuribacteraceae
      Dissulfuribacter thermophilus Slobodkin et al. 2013
  - - Sh68
      Dissulfurimicrobium hydrothermale Slobodkin et al. 2016
    - "Dissulfurirhabdaceae"
      Dissulfurirhabdus thermomarina Slobodkina et al. 2016
