= Thermodesulforhabdus =

Scientific classification
- Domain: Bacteria
- Kingdom: Pseudomonadati
- Phylum: Thermodesulfobacteriota
- Class: Deltaproteobacteria
- Order: Syntrophobacterales
- Family: Thermodesulforhabdaceae; Waite et al. 2020
- Genus: Thermodesulforhabdus; Beeder et al. 1996
- Species: T. norvegica

Binomial name
- Thermodesulforhabdus norvegica corrig. Beeder et al. 1996

Genus of bacteria

Thermodesulforhabdus is an acetate-oxidizing bacterial genus from the order Syntrophobacterales. The only species is Thermodesulforhabdus norvegica.

Thermodesulforhabdus norvegica is a thermophilic sulfate-reducing bacteria. It is gram-negative, with type strain A8444.
