= Dissulfuribacter =

Scientific classification
- Domain: Bacteria
- Kingdom: Pseudomonadati
- Phylum: Thermodesulfobacteriota
- Class: Dissulfuribacteria
- Order: Dissulfuribacterales
- Family: Dissulfuribacteraceae
- Genus: Dissulfuribacter; Slobodkin et al. 2013

Type species
- Dissulfuribacter thermophilus Slobodkin et al. 2013

Species
- D. thermophilus

Genus of bacteria

Dissulfuribacter is a genus of anaerobic chemolithoautotrophic bacteria within Dissulfuribacteraceae, Desulfobacterota. The only described member species is Dissulfuribacter thermophilus.

== Taxonomy ==
- Species: Dissulfuribacter thermophilus
