= Dissulfuribacteraceae =

Scientific classification
- Domain: Bacteria
- Kingdom: Pseudomonadati
- Phylum: Proteobacteria
- Class: Dissulfuribacteria
- Order: Dissulfuribacterales
- Family: Dissulfuribacteraceae; Waite et al. 2020

Genus
- Dissulfuribacter

Family of bacteria

The Dissulfuribacteraceae are a family of anaerobic chemolithoautotrophic bacteria within Dissulfuribacterales, Desulfobacterota. The only described member species is Dissulfuribacter thermophilus.

== Taxonomy ==
- Genus: Dissulfuribacter Slobodkin et al. 2013
  - Species: Dissulfuribacter thermophilus Slobodkin et al. 2013

== See also ==
- List of bacterial orders
- List of bacteria genera
