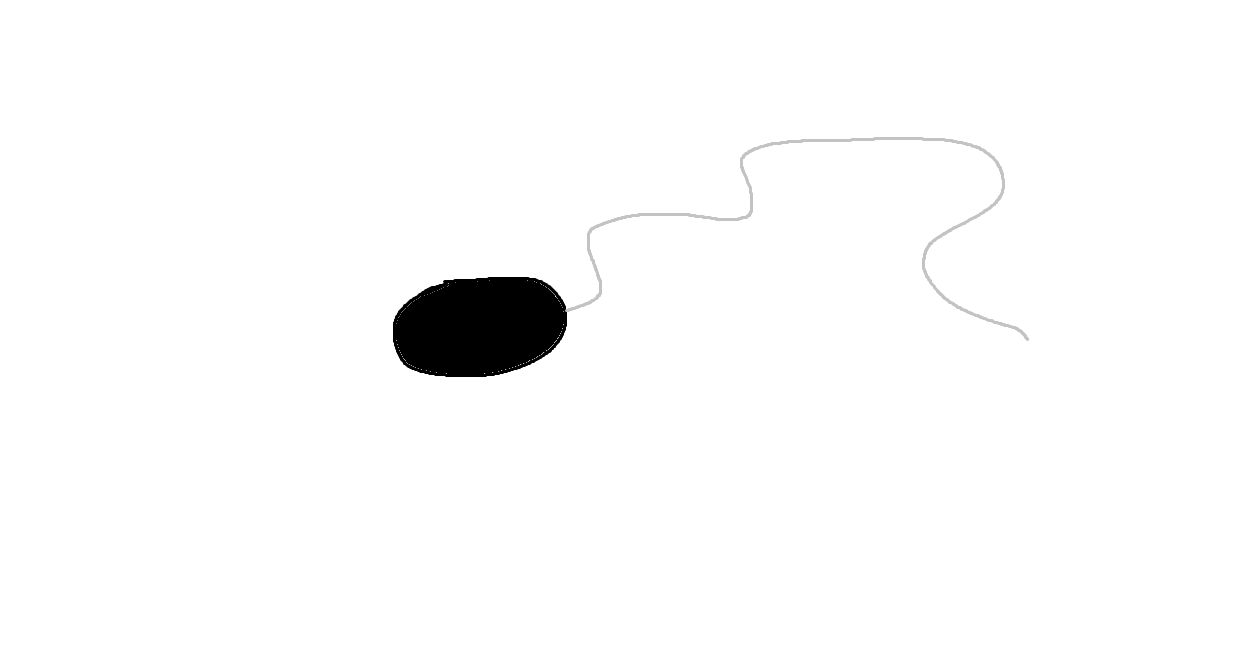
- Depiction of Deferrisoma camini S3R1T strand

Scientific classification
- Domain: Bacteria
- Kingdom: Pseudomonadati
- Phylum: Thermodesulfobacteriota
- Class: Deferrisomatia
- Order: Deferrisomatales
- Family: Deferrisomataceae
- Genus: Deferrisoma
- Species: D. camini

Binomial name
- Deferrisoma camini Slobodkina et al. 2012

Type strain
- DSM 24185, S3R1, VKM B-2672

Synonyms
- Deferrisoma caminum

= Deferrisoma camini =

Species of bacterium

Deferrisoma camini is a moderately thermophilic and anaerobic bacterium from the genus Deferrisoma which has been isolated from a deep-sea hydrothermal vent from the Eastern Lau Spreading Centre in the Pacific Ocean.

== Taxonomy ==
Deferrisoma camini is one of the two known species in the Deferrisoma genus. They are rod-shaped, have a single motile polar flagellum, and are gram negative. It has been identified as a thermophilic, anaerobic, iron (III) reducing bacterium that can be found near deep-sea hydrothermal vents. Deferrisoma camini has an optimum temperature growth of 50°C with an optimum pH range of growth at a pH of 6.5. High temperature, mild pH level, iron-rich environments, mainly deep sea hydrothermal vents, favor Deferrisoma camini.

== Function and structure ==
The main function of Deferrisoma camini is to reduce iron (III) in its micro-community. Deferrisoma camini can be cultured in a bicarbonate-buffered sterile liquid medium. Deferrisoma camini can use acetate, fumarate, malate, maleinate, succinate, stearate, palmitate, propanol, peptone, and yeast extract as electron donors with elemental sulfur and iron (III) as the electron acceptors for the reduction process. The cell size for Deferrisoma camini is 0.5–0.6 μm in diameter and 0.8–1.3 μm long.
