= Deferrisoma palaeochoriense =

Scientific classification
- Domain: Bacteria
- Kingdom: Pseudomonadati
- Phylum: Thermodesulfobacteriota
- Class: Deferrisomatia
- Order: Deferrisomatales
- Family: Deferrisomataceae
- Genus: Deferrisoma
- Species: D. palaeochoriense

Binomial name
- Deferrisoma palaeochoriense Pérez-Rodríguez et al. 2016

Type strain
- DSM 29363, MAG-PB1

Synonyms
- Deferrisoma paleochoriense Deferrisoma paleochorii

Species of bacterium

Deferrisoma palaeochoriense is a thermophilic, anaerobic and mixotrophic bacterium from the genus Deferrisoma which has been isolated from a hydrothermal vent from the Palaeochori Bay from Greece.
