= D. vulgaris =

D. vulgaris may refer to:

- Dracunculus vulgaris, a plant species
- Desulfovibrio vulgaris, a bacterium species

== See also ==
- Vulgaris (disambiguation)
