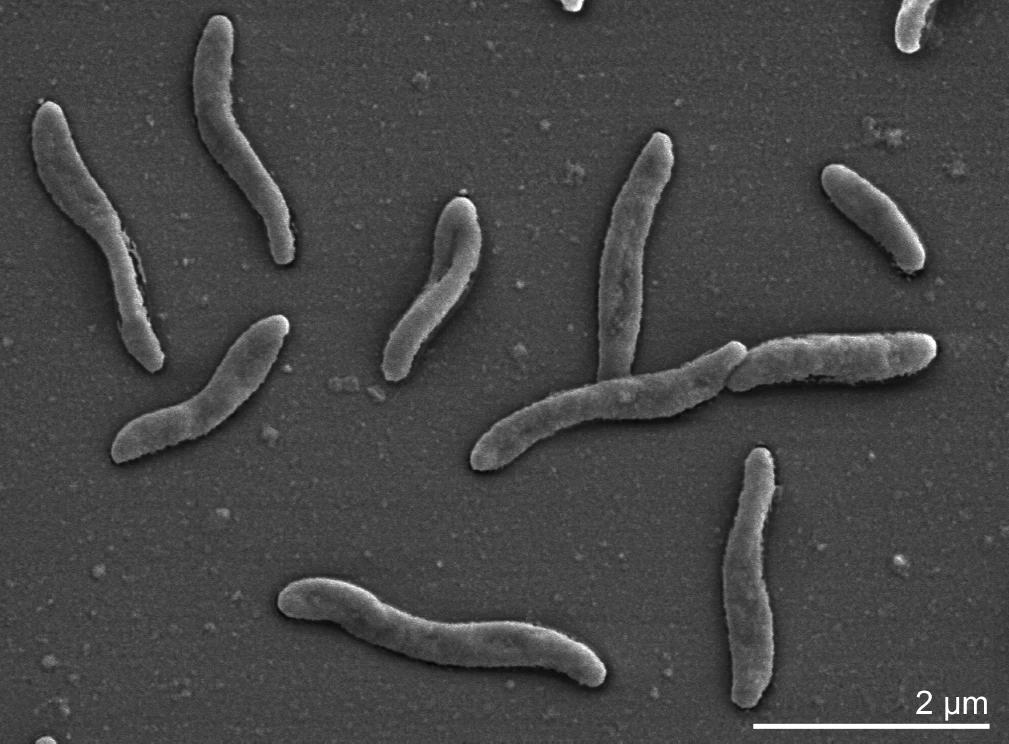
- Sulfurospirillum deleyianum type strain (5175T)

Scientific classification
- Domain: Bacteria
- Kingdom: Pseudomonadati
- Phylum: Campylobacterota
- Class: "Campylobacteria"
- Order: Campylobacterales
- Family: Campylobacteraceae
- Genus: Sulfurospirillum; Wolfe & Penning 1977

Type species
- Sulfurospirillum deleyianum Schumacher, Kroneck & Pfennig 1993

Species
- See text

Synonyms
- Dehalospirillum Scholz-Muramatsu et al. 2002; "Geospirillum" Lonergan et al. 1996

= Sulfurospirillum =

Genus of bacteria

Sulfurospirillum (/ˌsʌlfɜːroʊspɪˈrɪlʌm/ SULF-ur-oh-spə-RIHL-um) is a genus of the gram-negative, aerotolerant, rod-shaped bacteria in the family Campylobactaeraceae.

== Phylogeny ==
The currently accepted taxonomy is based on the List of Prokaryotic names with Standing in Nomenclature (LPSN) and National Center for Biotechnology Information (NCBI).

16S rRNA based LTP_10_2024

- - - Sulfurospirillaceae Sulfurospirillum
      - - "S. alkalitolerans" Sorokin et al. 2013
        - "S. tamanensis" Frolova et al. 2023
      - - S. arcachonense Finster et al. 1997
        - - S. cavolei Kodama, Ha & Watanabe 2007
          - - - S. barnesii Stolz et al. 1999
              - S. deleyianum Schumacher, Kroneck & Pfennig 1993
            - - S. diekertiae Jin et al. 2023
              - - S. multivorans (Scholz-Muramatsu et al. 2002) Luijten et al. 2003
                - - S. arsenophilum Stolz et al. 1999
                  - S. halorespirans Luitjen et al. 2003
  - - - Campylobacteraceae
        Campylobacter
    - Arcobacteraceae

120 marker proteins based GTDB 10-RS226

- - - Sulfurospirillaceae Sulfurospirillum
      - S. arcachonense
      - - S. cavolei
        - - - S. barnesii
            - S. deleyianum
          - - S. oryzae Xie et al. 2024
            - - S. arsenophilum
              - - S. diekertiae
                - - S. halorespirans
                  - S. multivorans
  - - UBA1877
      "Sulfurospirillum tamanensis"
    - Campylobacteraceae
      Campylobacter

Unassigned Sulfurospirillum species:

- "S. carboxydovorans" Jensen & Finster 2005
- "S. tacomaensis" Pietari 2002

== Details ==
Many species are microaerophillic, and are thus found in soil, groundwater, the deep sea, marine surface sediments, tube worm guts, and polluted environments. Many species can grow on toxic compounds such as arsenate and selenate, and in fact flourish in contaminated sites. Some species can respire organohalides. No species in the Sulfurospirillum genus have been found to be pathogenic thus far.

== See also ==
- List of bacterial orders
- List of bacteria genera
