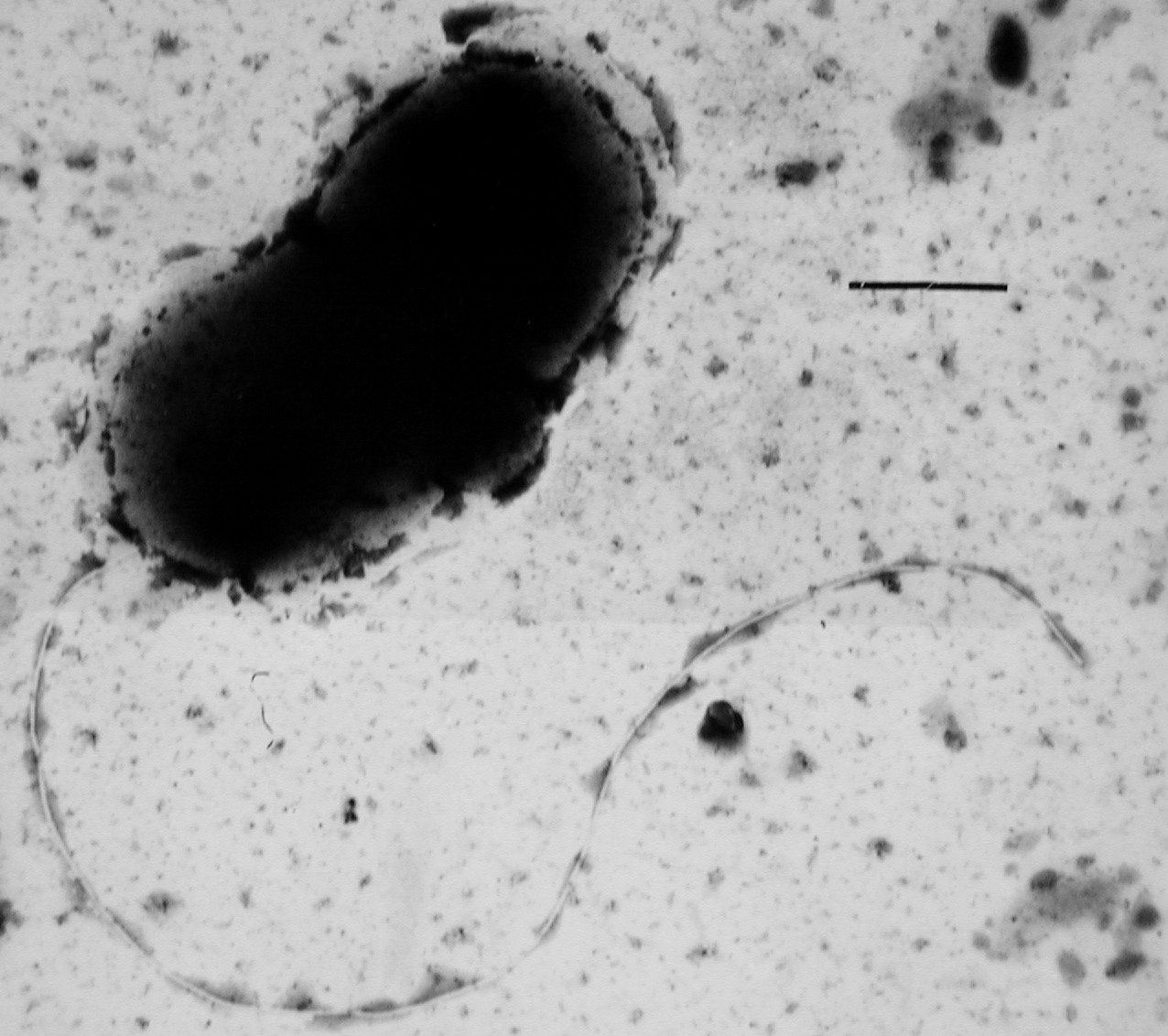

Scientific classification
- Domain: Bacteria
- Kingdom: Pseudomonadati
- Phylum: Thermodesulfobacteriota
- Class: Desulfovibrionia
- Order: Desulfovibrionales
- Family: Desulfovibrionaceae
- Genus: Nitratidesulfovibrio
- Species: N. vulgaris

Binomial name
- Nitratidesulfovibrio vulgaris (Postgate & Campbell 1966) Waite et al. 2020

Synonyms
- Desulfovibrio vulgaris Postgate and Campbell 1966 (Approved Lists 1980)

= Nitratidesulfovibrio vulgaris =

Species of bacterium

Nitratidesulfovibrio vulgaris (formerly Desulfovibrio vulgaris) is a species of Gram-negative sulfate-reducing bacteria in the Desulfovibrionaceae family. It is also an anaerobic bacterium that is an important organism involved in the bioremediation of heavy metals in the environment. N. vulgaris is often used as a model organism for sulfur-reducing bacteria and was the first of such bacteria to have its genome sequenced. It is ubiquitous in nature and has also been implicated in a variety of human bacterial infections, although it may only be an opportunistic pathogen. This microbe also has the ability to endure high salinity environments, which is done through the utilization of osmoprotectants and efflux systems.

== Description ==
Nitratidesulfovibrio vulgaris is a sulfate-reducing bacterium (SRB) that plays an important role in cycling elements. The metabolism of SRBs contributes to bioremediation by increasing their pH. SRBs also play a key role in biogeochemical cycles. Studies have shown that SRBs grow best with hydrogen and sulfate.

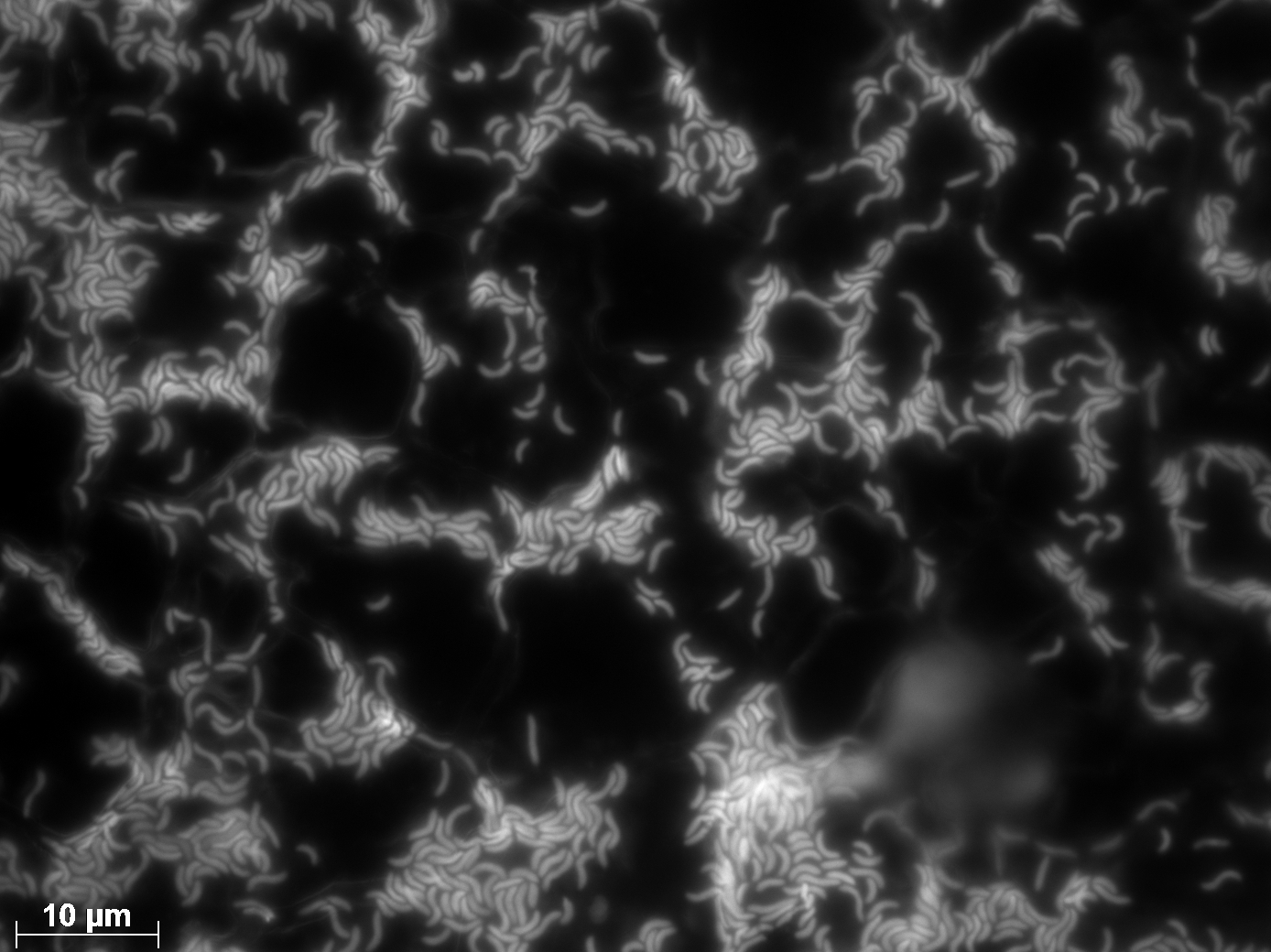
Related Oleidesulfovibrio alaskensis (formerly Desulfovibrio alaskensis) cells on stainless steel.

Nitratidesulfovibrio vulgaris can be used to remove metals from the environment due to its production of hydrogen sulfide. It can also carry out this process while being exposed to high concentrations of sodium chloride. During the removal of metals from mine waste piles, there was a removal efficiency of 99% by sulfate-reducing bacteria. However, it has been found that, at high concentrations, heavy metals can be toxic to N. vulgaris. N. vulgaris can also reduce the highly toxic Cr(VI) metal to a less toxic, less soluble Cr(III).

When N. vulgaris is exposed to increased salinity, it responds with the upregulation of chemotaxis genes and the downregulation of flagellar biosynthesis. The upregulation of chemotaxis genes may help move the cells away from the stressful environment. Another common response is the accumulation of neutral, polar, small molecules that serve as osmoprotectants, such as glycine betaine (GB) and proline. These molecules may either be synthesized in the cell or imported in. However, GB is only imported into the cell, and proline is not the preferred molecule to use by N. vulgaris.

This microbe also responds to increased salinity by using its efflux systems to pump excess salt ions out of the cell. This process, as well as GB import, requires more energy than the cells normally require. N. vulgaris also responds by increasing transcript levels of all Hmc operon members, indicating that electron channeling increases during salt stress. One notable characteristic of N. vulgaris is that it changes to have a more elongated structure when exposed to high salinity, possibly caused by inhibition of DNA replication.

Nitratidesulfovibrio vulgaris has been linked to several human bacterial infections but may just be an opportunistic pathogen. Overall, it may be a weak pathogen, but has a higher pathogenic potential than most other Desulfovibriona species. Most infections with N. vulgaris are susceptible to imipenem. These infections are an infrequent cause of diseases in humans.
