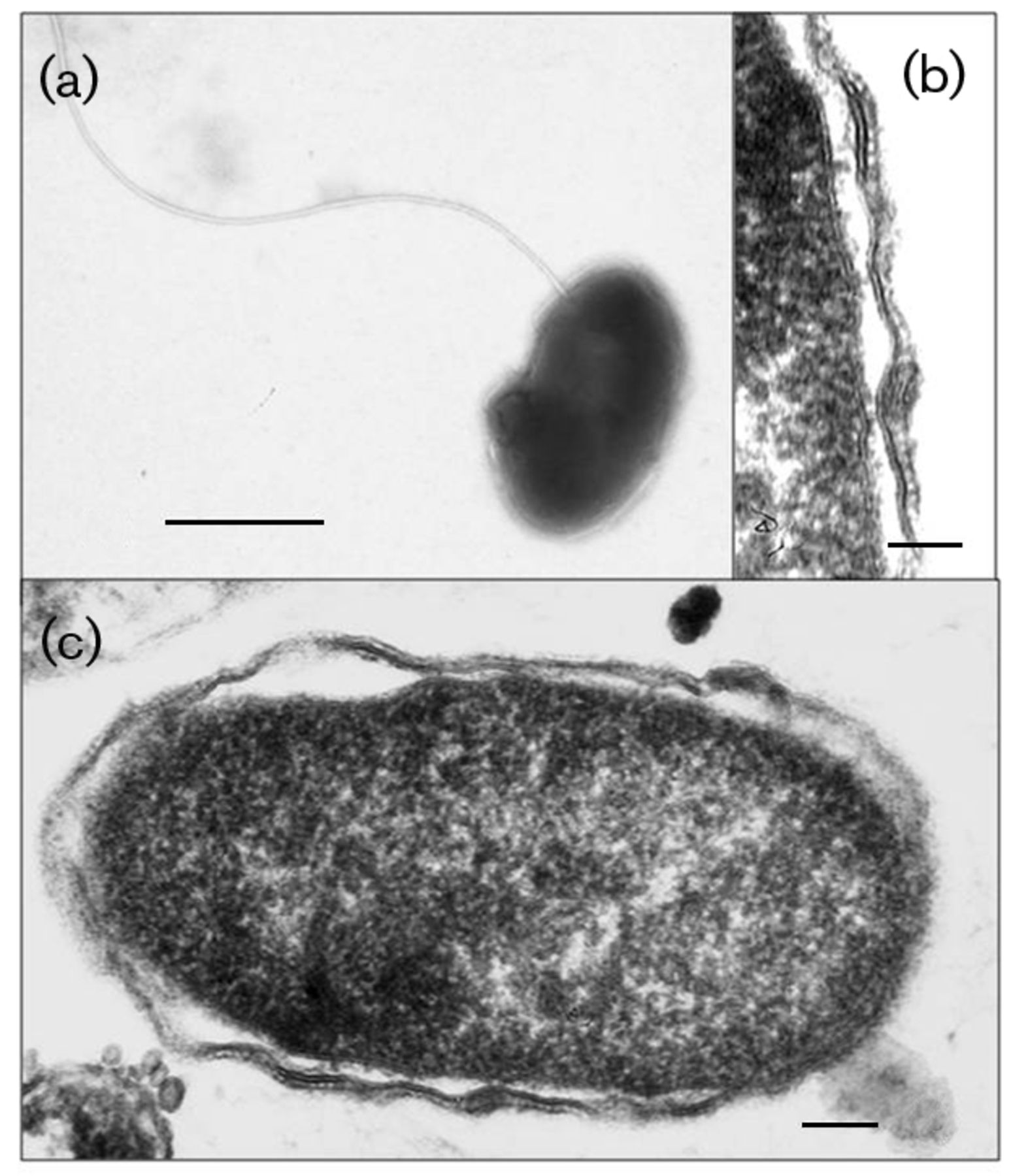
- Cell morphology of Dissulfuribacter thermophilus

Scientific classification
- Domain: Bacteria
- Kingdom: Pseudomonadati
- Phylum: Thermodesulfobacteriota
- Class: Dissulfuribacteria
- Order: Dissulfuribacterales
- Family: Dissulfuribacteraceae
- Genus: Dissulfuribacter
- Species: D. thermophilus

Binomial name
- Dissulfuribacter thermophilus Slobodkin et al., 2013

= Dissulfuribacter thermophilus =

Species of bacteria

Dissulfuribacter thermophilus is a thermophilic, autotrophic, sulfur-disproportionating bacterium with Gram-negative staining, short rod shape, and a single flagellum. The species is notable for its ability to disproportionate elemental sulfur at high temperatures combined with the inability to perform dissimilatory sulfate reduction. The type strain of this species, Dissulfuribacter thermophilus S69^{T}, was isolated from an active deep-sea hydrothermal vent.

== Discovery ==
The type strain S69^{T} ( = DSM 25762^{T} = VKM B-2760^{T}) was isolated from a chimney of an active deep-sea hydrothermal vent in the depth of 1910 m at Mariner hydrothermal field on the Valu Fa Ridge in the Lau Basin, South Pacific Ocean. The collection was carried out in June 2009 using WHOI's ROV JASON II during a research cruise of the oceanographic vessel RV Thomas Thompson. Description of the species was published in the International Journal of Systematic and Evolutionary Microbiology of the Microbiology Society in June 2013.

== Taxonomy ==
D. thermophilus is the only formally described species of the genus Dissulfuribacter, family Dissulfuribacteraceae, order Dissulfuribacterales, and class Dissulfuribacteria within the phylum Desulfobacterota.

== Morphology and ultrastructure ==
D. thermophilus grows as single cells or in pairs. The cells are 1.0–2.5 μm in length and 0.4–0.6 μm in diameter with a single polar flagellum. Formation of endospores was not observed. The cell wall type is Gram-negative.

== Metabolism ==
D. thermophilus uses elemental sulfur, thiosulfate, or sulfite as an energy source and bicarbonate/CO_{2} as a carbon source. Sulfur species are disproportionated to sulfide and sulfate. Growth is enhanced with ferryhydrite as a sulfide-scavenging agent. In contrast to typical members of the phylum Desulfobacterota, D. thermophilus is incapable of dissimilatory sulfate reduction. The type strain S69^{T} is able to grow through a combination of sulfite respiration and disproportionation.

== Environment ==
The temperature range for growth of D. thermophilus is 28–70 °C with an optimum at 61 °C. The pH range for growth is 5.6–7.9, with an optimum at pH 6.8. The NaCl concentration range is from 0.9% to 5.0 % (w/v) with an optimum at 1.8–2.7 %.

== Genomics ==
The GC content of the genomic DNA of the type strain S69^{T} was measured at 40.5 mol% (T_{m}). Genomic assembly of the type strain S69^{T} was published in July 2016. The genome, sequenced by the 454 Life Sciences technology, was assembled into 27 contigs of a total length of 2.5 Mb with GC content of 43.5% and 29x genome coverage. A fragmented partial genomic assembly from another isolate was published in March 2020, consisting of 420 contigs of a total length of 896 kb.

== See also ==
- Hydrothermal vent microbial communities
- Marine microorganisms
- Deep-sea communities
- Deep-sea exploration
- Sulfur cycle
