= Deferrisoma =

Scientific classification
- Domain: Bacteria
- Kingdom: Pseudomonadati
- Phylum: Thermodesulfobacteriota
- Class: Deferrisomatia; Waite et al. 2020
- Order: Deferrisomatales; Waite et al. 2020
- Family: Deferrisomataceae; Waite et al. 2020
- Genus: Deferrisoma; Slobodkina et al. 2012

Type species
- Deferrisoma camini Slobodkina et al. 2012

Species
- D. camini; D. palaeochoriense

Genus of bacteria

Deferrisoma is a genus of bacteria from the phylum Thermodesulfobacteriota. It is the only described member of the family Deferrisomataceae, order Deferrisomatales, and class Deferrisomatia. Known Deferrisoma species are thermophilic iron reducers that live on deep-sea and shallow hydrothermal vents.

== Phylogeny ==
The currently accepted taxonomy is based on the List of Prokaryotic names with Standing in Nomenclature (LPSN) and National Center for Biotechnology Information (NCBI).

16S rRNA based LTP_10_2024

- Deferrisoma
  - D. camini Slobodkina et al. 2012
  - D. palaeochoriensePerez-Rodriguez et al. 2016

120 marker proteins based GTDB 10-RS226

- Deferrisoma
  D. camini

== See also ==
- List of bacterial orders
- List of bacteria genera
