= Anaerobacillus arseniciselenatis =

Scientific classification
- Domain: Bacteria
- Kingdom: Bacillati
- Phylum: Bacillota
- Class: Bacilli
- Order: Caryophanales
- Family: Bacillaceae
- Genus: Bacillus
- Species: B. arseniciselenatis

Binomial name
- Bacillus arseniciselenatis Blum et al., 1998

Species of bacterium

Bacillus arseniciselenatis is a bacterium first isolated from Mono Lake, California. It is notable for respiring oxyanions of selenium and arsenic. It is spore-forming, rod-shaped and alkaliphile, its type strain being E1H. It is a strict anaerobe.
