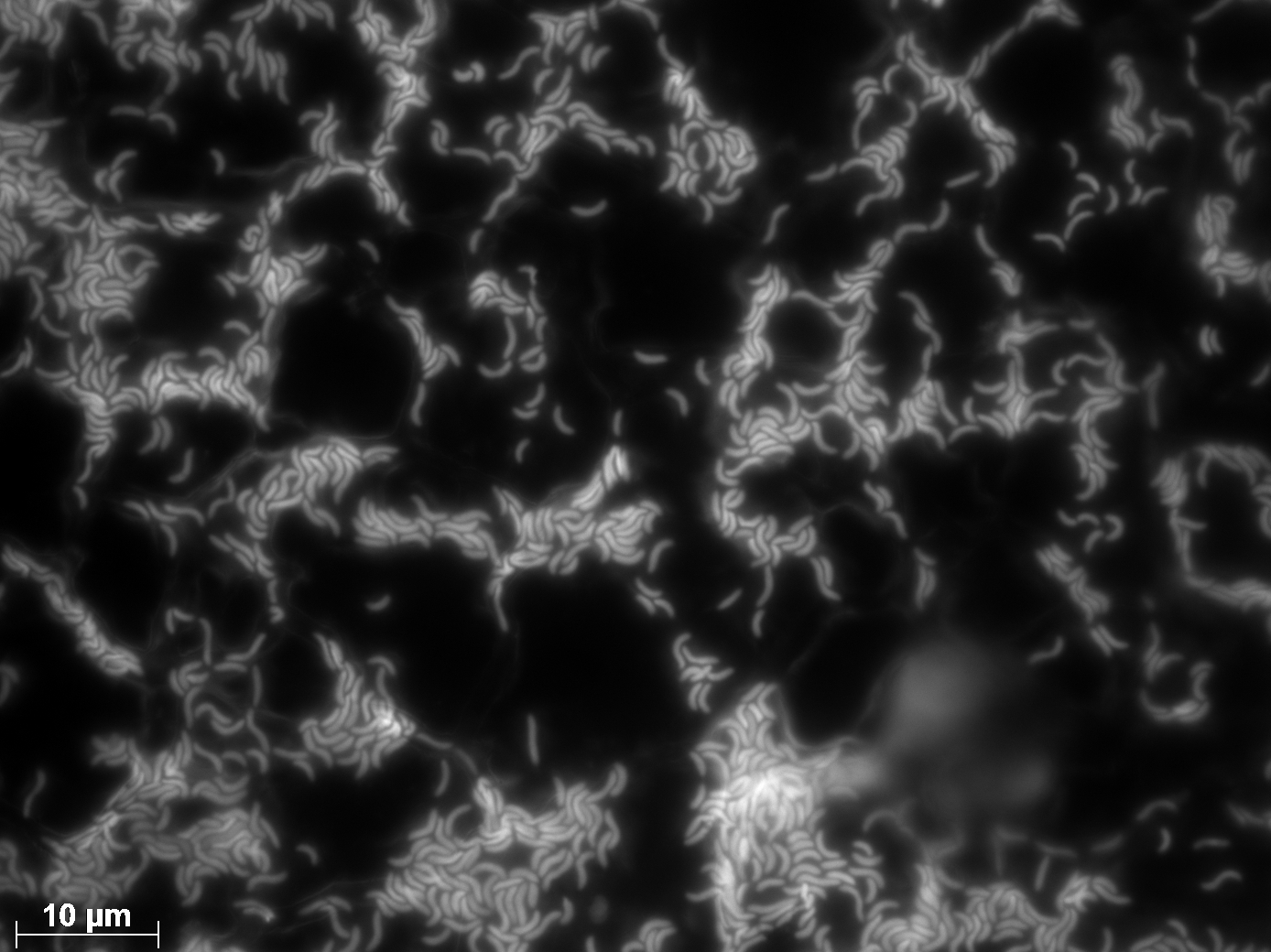

Scientific classification
- Domain: Bacteria
- Kingdom: Pseudomonadati
- Phylum: Thermodesulfobacteriota
- Class: Desulfovibrionia
- Order: Desulfovibrionales
- Family: Desulfovibrionaceae
- Genus: Oleidesulfovibrio
- Species: O. alaskensis

Binomial name
- Oleidesulfovibrio alaskensis (Feio et al. 2004) Waite et al. 2020

= Oleidesulfovibrio alaskensis =

Species of bacterium

Oleidesulfovibrio alaskensis (formerly Desulfovibrio alaskensis) is a sulfate-reducing bacterium. The type strain is Al1^{T} (= NCIMB 13491^{T} = DSM 16109^{T}).

== Biology ==
Oleidesulfovibrio alaskensis has the ability to reduce radionuclides and heavy metals such as uranium and chromium to soluble and less toxic forms. The O. alaskensis strain G20 is an anaerobe with an optimal temperature range of 25°C-40°C. It is a Gram-negative bacterium that is rod shaped, does not produce endospores, and is arranged in single cells. This strain is not known to cause any disease.

== Genomics ==
Several strains of O. alaskensis have been sequenced: G20 (DOE JGI, 2007-2011), RB2256, and DSM 16109 (DOE JGI 2013).
