= Desulfomonile =

Scientific classification
- Domain: Bacteria
- Kingdom: Pseudomonadati
- Phylum: Thermodesulfobacteriota
- Class: Desulfomonilia; Waite et al. 2020
- Order: Desulfomonilales; Waite et al. 2020
- Family: Desulfomonilaceae; Waite et al. 2020
- Genus: Desulfomonile; DeWeerd et al. 1991

Type species
- Desulfomonile tiedjei DeWeerd et al. 1991

Species
- D. limimaris; "Ca. D. palmitatoxidans"; D. tiedjei

Genus of bacteria

Desulfomonile is a Gram negative, strictly anaerobic, and non-motile bacterial genus from the phylum Thermodesulfobacteriota. Desulfomonile bacteria can reduce sulfur oxyanions to H_{2}S. It is the only known member of the family Desulfomonilaceae, order Desulfomonilales, and class Desulfomonilia.

== Phylogeny ==
The currently accepted taxonomy is based on the List of Prokaryotic names with Standing in Nomenclature (LPSN) and National Center for Biotechnology Information (NCBI).

16S rRNA based LTP_10_2024

- Desulfomonile
  - D. limimaris Sun et al. 2001
  - D. tiedjei DeWeerd et al. 1991

120 marker proteins based GTDB 10-RS226

- Desulfomonile
  D. tiedjei

== See also ==
- List of bacterial orders
- List of bacteria genera
