= Sulfurospirillum barnesii =

Scientific classification
- Domain: Bacteria
- Kingdom: Pseudomonadati
- Phylum: Campylobacterota
- Class: "Campylobacteria"
- Order: Campylobacterales
- Family: Campylobacteraceae
- Genus: Sulfurospirillum
- Species: S. barnesii

Binomial name
- Sulfurospirillum barnesii Stolz et al. 1999

Species of bacterium

Sulfurospirillum barnesii is a bacterium.
