= Desulfomonile tiedjei =

Scientific classification
- Domain: Bacteria
- Kingdom: Pseudomonadati
- Phylum: Thermodesulfobacteriota
- Class: Desulfomonilia
- Order: Desulfomonilales
- Family: Desulfomonilaceae
- Genus: Desulfomonile
- Species: D. tiedjei

Binomial name
- Desulfomonile tiedjei DeWeerd et al., 1990

Species of bacterium

Desulfomonile tiedjei is a bacterium. It is anaerobic, dehalogenating, sulfate-reducing, Gram-negative, non-motile, non-spore-forming and rod-shaped with an unusual morphological feature which resembles a collar. Its type strain is DCB-1.
