= Syntrophaceae =

Scientific classification
- Domain: Bacteria
- Kingdom: Pseudomonadati
- Phylum: Thermodesulfobacteriota
- Class: Syntrophia
- Order: Syntrophales
- Family: Syntrophaceae; Waite et al. 2020

Genera
- Desulfobacca; Desulfomonile; Smithella; Syntrophus

Family of bacteria

Syntrophaceae is a family of bacteria in the order Syntrophales. It comprises four genera: Syntrophus, Smithella, Desulfobacca and Desulfomonile. All members have rod-shaped cells and do not form spores. As gram-negative bacteria, the presence of a thin cell wall and a double membrane is notable. This bacterium usually forms red or pink colonies.

== Metabolism ==
Syntrophaceae are strict anaerobes, utilizing either respiratory or fermentative metabolism, and grow only in the presence of hydrogen/formate-utilizing partners in syntrophic relationships. They use simple organic molecules as electron donors, oxidizing substrates to either acetate or carbon dioxide. All are mesophilic and chemoorganoheterotrophic, except for Desulfomonile species, which can grow autotrophically on hydrogen and carbon dioxide.

Some genera, such as Syntrophus and Smithella, can use crotonate as an electron acceptor for fermentative growth. Other genera like Desulfobacca and Desulfomonile can reduce sulfate, sulfite, and thiosulfate to sulfide, with Desulfomonile also able to reductively dehalogenate m-halogenated benzoates to their corresponding benzoate derivatives.

== Genome sequencing ==
The complete genome sequence of three members of this family has been analyzed:

- Syntrophus aciditrophicus, strain SB, is 3,179,300 base pairs long, with 3,217 genes, 3,166 of which encode proteins. The G+C content is 51.5%.
- Desulfobacca acetoxidans, strain ASRB2, spans 3,282,536 base pairs, containing 3,022 genes (2,969 protein-coding and 54 RNA-coding). The G+C content is 52.9%.
- Desulfomonile tiedjei, strain DCB-1, is 6,500,104 base pairs long, consisting of one chromosome and a 26,923 bp plasmid, with 5,664 genes, 5,494 of which are protein-coding. The G+C content is 50.1%.

What can be gathered from this information is that AprBA of Desulfobacca acetoxidans is closely related to the AprBA sequences of green sulfur bacteria and the AprBA of Desulfomonile tiedjei resembles the gram-positive type. Both genomes of these families contain single copies of the dissimilatory adenylyl sulfate reductase (AprBA) linked to the membrane-bound Qmo complex (QmoABC) and the dissimilatory sulfite reduction (DsrAB) linked to the DsrMKJOP complex. All of these are absent in the genome of Syntrophus aciditrophicus.

By sequencing 16S rRNA gene from environmental samples (such as sewage sludge, sediment, or human gut) researchers can identify the presence and abundance of Syntrophales. This sequencing has become a rapid and reliable way to identify bacterial strains that may otherwise be difficult to distinguish using traditional culturing methods. Particularly due to the involvement this family of bacterium have with complex, anaerobic metabolic processes. By comparing the 16S rRNA sequence of an unknown strain to known sequences in databases, researchers can confirm whether it belongs to the Syntrophales or to a closely related group.

== Ecology ==
The four genera mentioned previously were isolated from a variety of environments, including freshwater, brackish, and marine habitats. Key strains include:

- Syntrophus buswellii (strain SB): Initially isolated as part of a syntrophic coculture from anaerobic digester sludge in Urbana, Illinois, using benzoate as a substrate. A pure culture was later obtained using crotonate.
- Syntrophus aciditrophicus (strain SB): Isolated from secondary anaerobic digester sludge in Norman, Oklahoma, using crotonate in a syntrophic benzoate-degrading culture.
- Syntrophus gentianae (strain HQGö1): Isolated from anoxic sewage sludge in Göttingen, Germany, using hydroquinone or gentisate as substrates.
- Smithella propionica (strain LYP): Isolated from anoxic sewage sludge in Oregon, USA, with crotonate from a syntrophic propionate-degrading culture.

Additional strains that are not involved in anaerobic degradation of organic compounds or coupled with methane formation include:

- Desulfobacca acetoxidans (strain ASRB2): Isolated from granular sludge in a laboratory reactor using acetate as the sole carbon and electron source.
- Desulfomonile tiedjei (strain DCB-1): Isolated from a sewage sludge consortium degrading 3-chlorobenzoate.
- Desulfomonile limimaris (strain DCB-M): Isolated from sulfate-free medium with 3-chlorobenzoate as the electron acceptor and pyruvate/lactate as electron donors, from anoxic marine sediment.
