= Sulfurospirillum arsenophilum =

Scientific classification
- Domain: Bacteria
- Kingdom: Pseudomonadati
- Phylum: Campylobacterota
- Class: "Campylobacteria"
- Order: Campylobacterales
- Family: Campylobacteraceae
- Genus: Sulfurospirillum
- Species: S. arsenophilum

Binomial name
- Sulfurospirillum arsenophilum Stolz et al. 1999

Species of bacterium

Sulfurospirillum arsenophilum is a bacterium. It is notable for metabolising arsenic, hence its name.
