= Syntrophales =

Scientific classification
- Domain: Bacteria
- Kingdom: Pseudomonadati
- Phylum: Thermodesulfobacteriota
- Class: Syntrophia; Waite et al. 2020
- Order: Syntrophales; Waite et al. 2020

Families
- Syntrophaceae; Smithellaceae

Order of bacteria

The Syntrophales are an order of gram-negative Thermodesulfobacteriota. It is the only order in the monotypic class Syntrophia. Acetate is converted by syntrophales into acetyl-CoA, which can be used as a source of carbon and energy. Given that genes involved in fermentation were missing, this might then be channeled into gluconeogenesis.
