= Syntrophobacteraceae =

Scientific classification
- Domain: Bacteria
- Kingdom: Pseudomonadati
- Phylum: Proteobacteria
- Class: Deltaproteobacteria
- Order: Syntrophobacterales
- Family: Syntrophobacteraceae; Waite et al. 2020

Genera
- Desulfacinum; Desulfoferrobacter; Desulfoglaeba; Desulforhabdus; Desulfosoma; Desulfovirga; Syntrophobacter; Syntrophobacterium

Family of bacteria

The Syntrophobacteraceae are a family of Thermodesulfobacteriota.

== Phylogeny ==
The currently accepted taxonomy is based on the List of Prokaryotic names with Standing in Nomenclature (LPSN) and National Center for Biotechnology Information (NCBI).

16S rRNA based LTP_10_2024

- Syntrophobacteraceae
  - Desulfoferrobacter Davidova et al. 2022
  - - Desulforhabdus Oude Elferink et al. 1997
    - - Desulfovirga Tanaka et al. 2000
      - Syntrophobacter Boone & Bryant 1984
        [incl. Syntrophobacterium Galushko & Kuever 2021]

120 marker proteins based GTDB 10-RS226

- Syntrophobacteraceae
  - Desulfoferrobacter
  - - Desulforhabdus
    - Syntrophobacter

== See also ==
- List of bacterial orders
- List of bacteria genera
