= Syntrophobacterales =

Scientific classification
- Domain: Bacteria
- Kingdom: Pseudomonadati
- Phylum: Thermodesulfobacteriota
- Class: Syntrophobacteria; Waite et al. 2020
- Order: Syntrophobacterales; Waite et al. 2020

Families
- "Desulfosomataceae"; Syntrophobacteraceae; Thermodesulforhabdaceae

Order of bacteria

The Syntrophobacterales are an order of the bacterial phylum Desulfobacterota. It is the only member of the class Syntrophobacteria. All genera are strictly anaerobic. Many members of the family Syntrophobacteraceae are sulfate-reducing. Some species are motile by using one polar flagellum.

== Phylogeny ==
The currently accepted taxonomy is based on the List of Prokaryotic names with Standing in Nomenclature (LPSN) and National Center for Biotechnology Information (NCBI).

16S rRNA based LTP_10_2024

- - - - Desulfoglaeba Davidova et al. 2006
      - Thermodesulforhabdaceae Waite et al. 2020
    - "Desulfosomataceae" Pallen, Rodriguez-R & Alikhan 2022
  - Syntrophobacteraceae Kuever, Rainey & Widdel 2006

120 marker proteins based GTDB 10-RS226

- - Thermodesulforhabdaceae
  - - Syntrophobacteraceae
    - "Desulfosomataceae"
