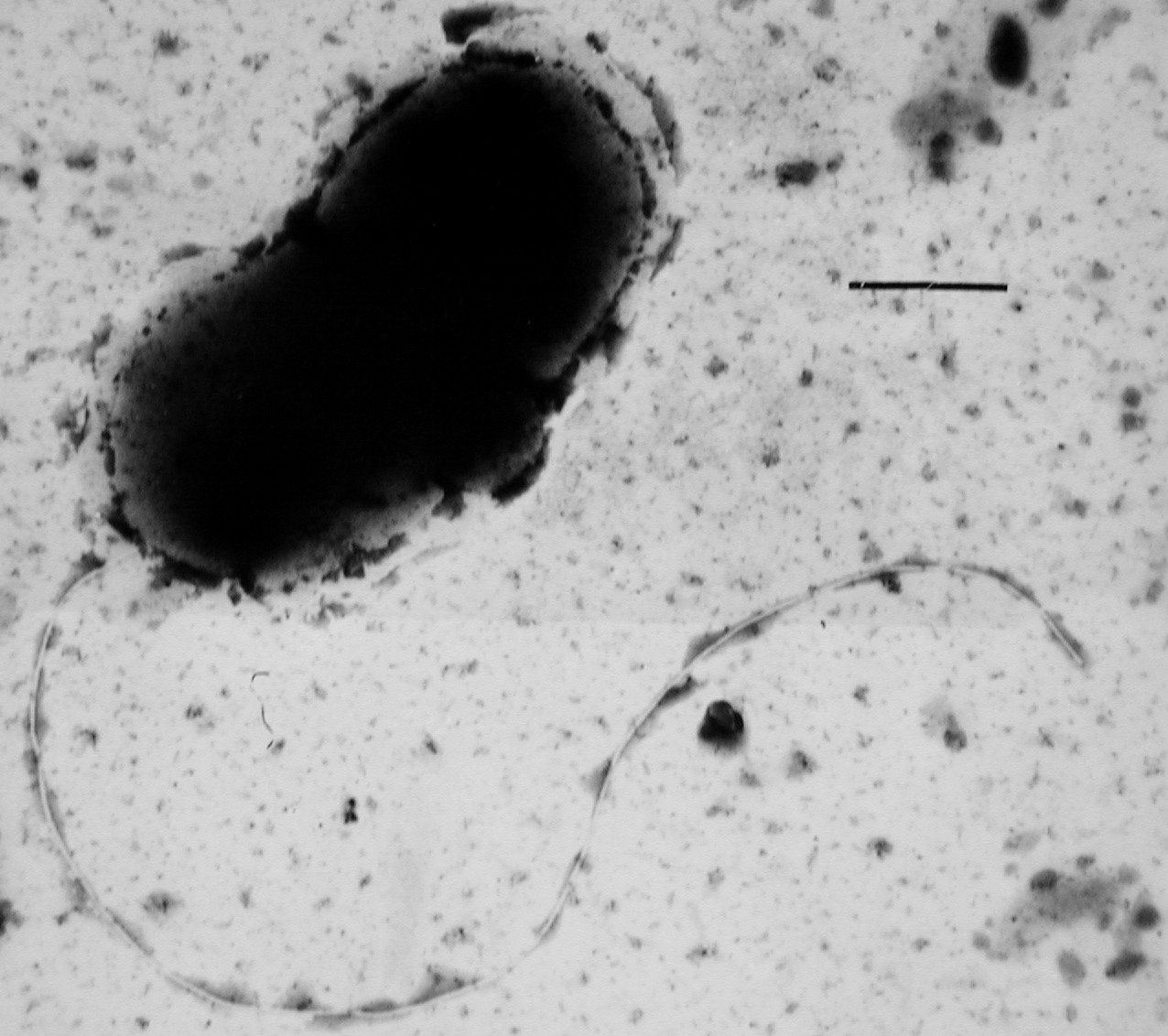
- Nitratidesulfovibrio vulgaris

Scientific classification
- Domain: Bacteria
- Kingdom: Pseudomonadati
- Phylum: Thermodesulfobacteriota; Garrity & Holt 2021

Classes
- "Ca. Anaeroferrophillalia" Murphy et al. 2021; "Ca. Anaeropigmentia" Murphy et al. 2021; "Ca. Dadabacteria"; Deferrisomatia Waite et al. 2020; Desulfarculia Waite et al. 2020; Desulfobaccia Waite et al. 2020; Desulfobacteria Waite et al. 2020; Desulfobulbia Waite et al. 2020; "Ca. Desulfofervidia" Waite et al. 2020; Desulfomonilia Waite et al. 2020; Desulfovibrionia Waite et al. 2020; Desulfuromonadia Waite et al. 2020; Dissulfuribacteria Waite et al. 2020; Syntrophia Waite et al. 2020; Syntrophobacteria Waite et al. 2020; Syntrophorhabdia Waite et al. 2020; Thermodesulfobacteria Hatchikian et al. 2002; "Ca. Zymogenia" Murphy et al. 2021

Synonyms
- Desulfobacterota Waite et al. 2020; "Ca. Dadabacteria" Hug et al. 2016; "Thermodesulfobacteraeota" Oren et al. 2015; Thermodesulfobacteria Garrity and Holt 2002

= Thermodesulfobacteriota =

Phylum of Gram-negative bacteria

The Thermodesulfobacteriota, or Desulfobacterota, are a phylum of anaerobic Gram-negative bacteria. Many representatives are sulfate-reducing bacteria, others can grow by disproportionation of various sulphur species, reduction of iron, or even use external surfaces as electron acceptors (exoelectrogens). They have highly variable morphology: vibrio, rods, cocci, as well as filamentous cable bacteria. Individual members of Desulfobacterota are also studied for their bacterial nanowires or syntrophic relationships.

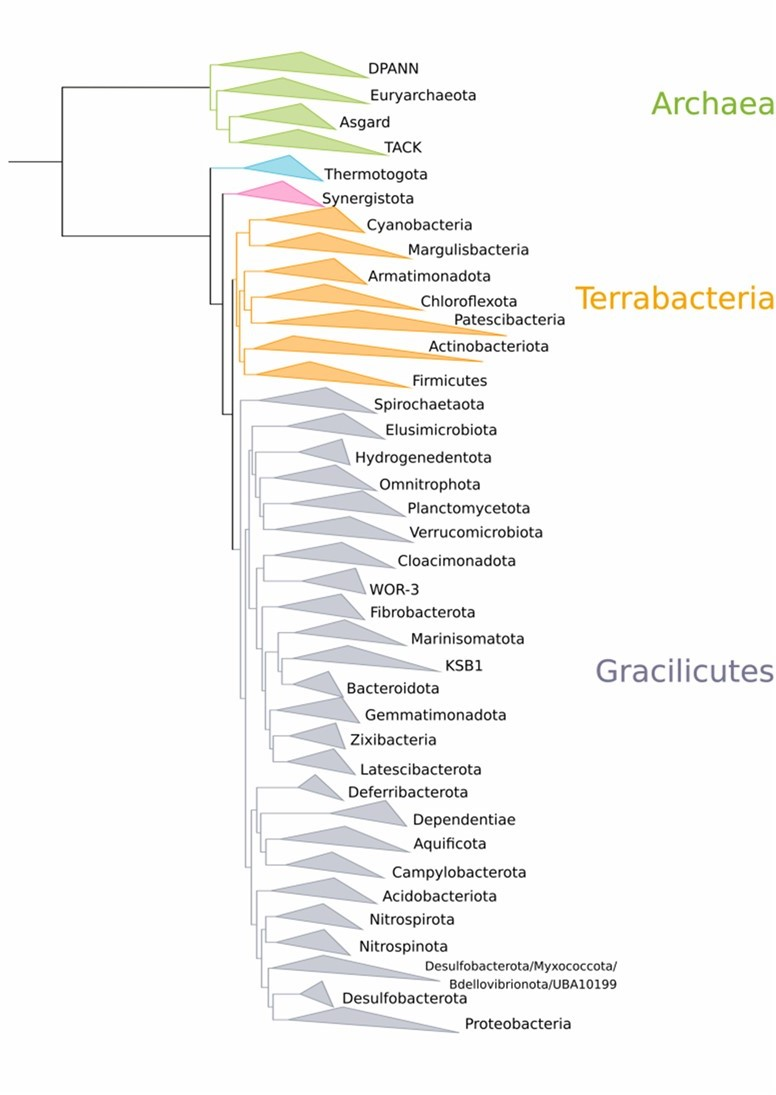
Phylogenetic tree of prokaryotes based on ribosomal proteins and RNA polymerase Desulfobacterota are closely related to Pseudomonadota/Proteobacteria, Myxococcota, and Bdellovibrionota.

== Taxonomy ==
The bacterial phylum Desulfobacterota has been created by merging: 1) the well-established class Thermodesulfobacteria, 2) the proposed phylum Dadabacteria, and 3) various taxa separated from the abandoned non-monophyletic class "Deltaproteobacteria" alongside three other phyla: Myxococcota, Bdellovibrionota, and SAR324.

== Environment ==
In contrast to their close relatives, the aerobic phyla Myxococcota and Bdellovibrionota, Desulfobacterota are predominantly anaerobic. They likely retained their anaerobic lifestyle since before the Great Oxidation Event.

Three closely related classes within Desulfobacterota: Thermodesulfobacteria, Dissulfuribacteria, and Desulfofervidia, as well as the more distant Deferrisomatia, are exclusively thermophilic, while most members of other classes are mesophiles or even psychrophiles.

== Metabolism ==
Sulfate-reducing bacteria (SRB) utilize sulfate as a terminal electron acceptor in a respiratory-type metabolism, coupled to the oxidation of organic compounds or hydrogen. By reducing sulfate, many Desulfobacterota species substantially contribute to the sulfur cycle.

Dissimilatory sulfate reduction

Microbial sulfur disproportionation (MSD) is a poorly known type of energy metabolism analogous to organic fermentation, where a single inorganic sulfur species of intermediate oxidation state is simultaneously oxidized and reduced, resulting in production of sulfide and sulfate. In Desulfobacterota, MSD is often present in species that also perform sulfate reduction.

Sulfur oxidation is rare among Desulfobacterota. However, several strains are known to perform this type of metabolism using diverse mechanisms. Strain MLMS-1 (Desulfobacterota incertae sedis) couples oxidation of sulfide to reduction of arsenate. Dissulfuribacter thermophilus (Dissulfuribacteria) oxidizes elemental sulfur with dissimilatory nitrate reduction to ammonium. Desulfurivibrio alkaliphilus (Desulfobulbia) couples oxidation of sulfide to the dissimilatory reduction of nitrate and nitrite to ammonium. Cable bacteria (Desulfobulbia), closely related to D. alkaliphilus, oxidize sulfide using a long-distance electron transport to oxygen or nitrate reduction — see below. The genome of strain M19 (also Desulfobulbia) encodes the Sox system of sulfur oxidation.

Fe(III) minerals can be microbially reduced by Fe-reducing bacteria (FeRB) using a wide range of organic compounds or H_{2} as electron donors. FeRB are widespread across Bacteria. Among Desulfobacterota, they are represented e.g. by the genus Geobacter (Desulfuromonadia).

Certain species of the families Geobacteraceae and Desulfuromonadaceae (Desulfuromonadia) are able to use external surfaces as electron acceptors to complete respiration. Species of the genus Geobacter use bacterial nanowires to transfer electrons to extracellular electron acceptors such as Fe(III) oxides.

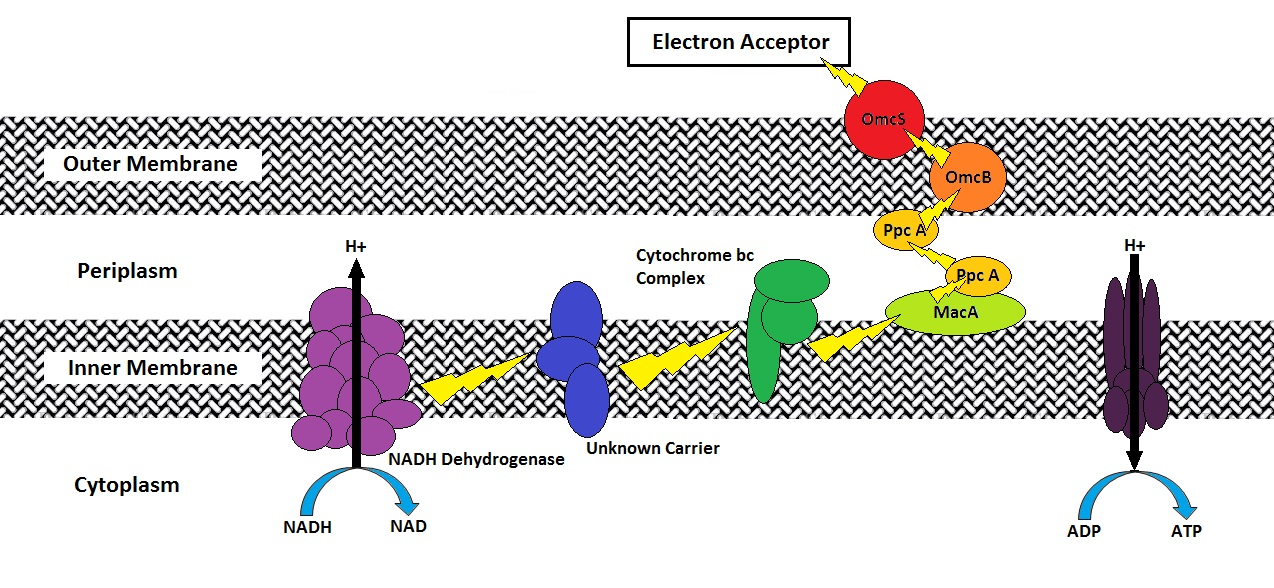
Alternative electron transport chain to move electrons to outer membrane of Geobacter sulfurreducens

Certain species of the class Syntrophia use simple organic molecules as electron donors and grow only in the presence of H_{2}/formate-utilizing partners (methanogens or Desulfovibrio) in syntrophic associations.

The family Desulfobulbaceae contains two genera of cable bacteria: Electronema and Electrothrix. These filamentous bacteria conduct electricity across distances over 1 cm, which allows them to connect distant sources of electron donors and electron acceptors.

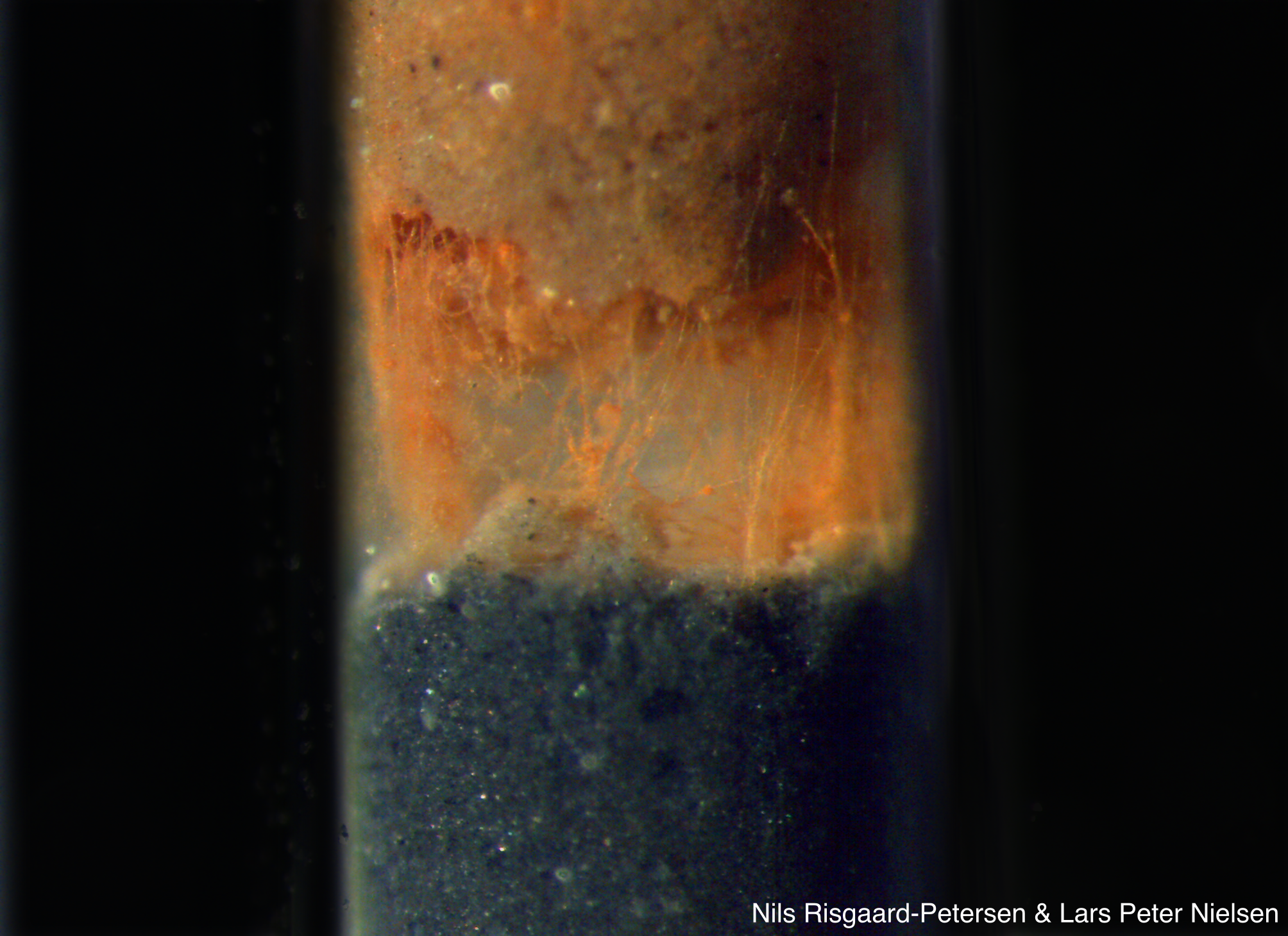
Cable bacteria in between two layers of sediment

Diagram demonstrating cable bacteria metabolism in surface sediment

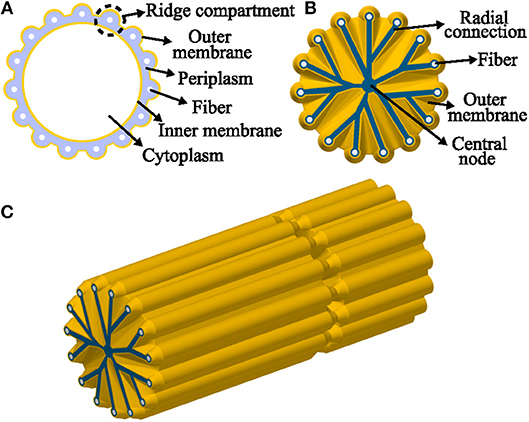
Model representation of a cable bacteria cell

== Notable species ==
- Desulfobulbus propionicus (Desulfobulbia), described in 1982 from mud samples in Germany, can serve as a biocatalyst in microbial electrosynthesis, i.e. the usage of electrons by microorganism to reduce carbon dioxide to organic molecules.
- Lawsonia intracellularis (Desulfovibrionia), described in 1995 from the intestines of pigs with proliferative enteropathy disease, is a highly pathogenic intracellular parasite.
- Oleidesulfovibrio alaskensis (Desulfovibrionia), described in 2004 from an oil well in Alaska, corrodes metals and reduces toxic radionuclides and metals such as uranium and chromium to less soluble and less toxic forms.
- Syntrophorhabdus aromaticivorans (Syntrophorhabdia), described in 2008 from industrial wastewater, is the first cultured anaerobe capable of degrading phenol to acetate in obligate syntrophic associations with a hydrogenotrophic methanogen.
- Dissulfuribacter thermophilus (Dissulfuribacteria), described in 2013 from a deep-sea hydrothermal vent, does not reduce sulfate and instead disproportionates elemental sulfur and other intermediate sulfur species.
- Ca. Desulfofervidus auxilii (Ca. Desulfofervidia), described in 2016 from Guaymas Basin sediments, is involved in the anaerobic oxidation of methane (AOM) together with archaeal syntrophic partners.

== Microscopy ==
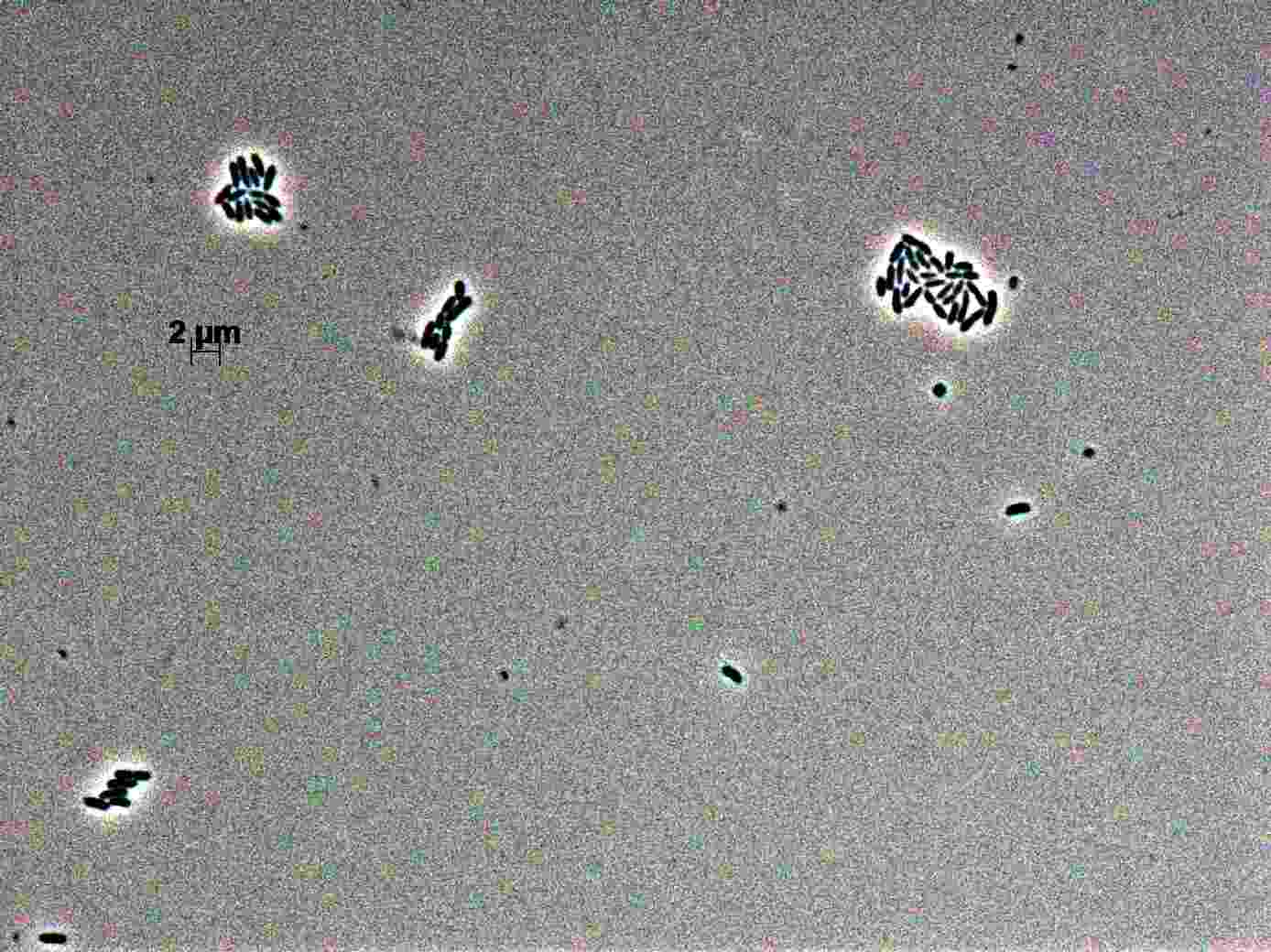
Thermodesulfobacterium hveragerdense

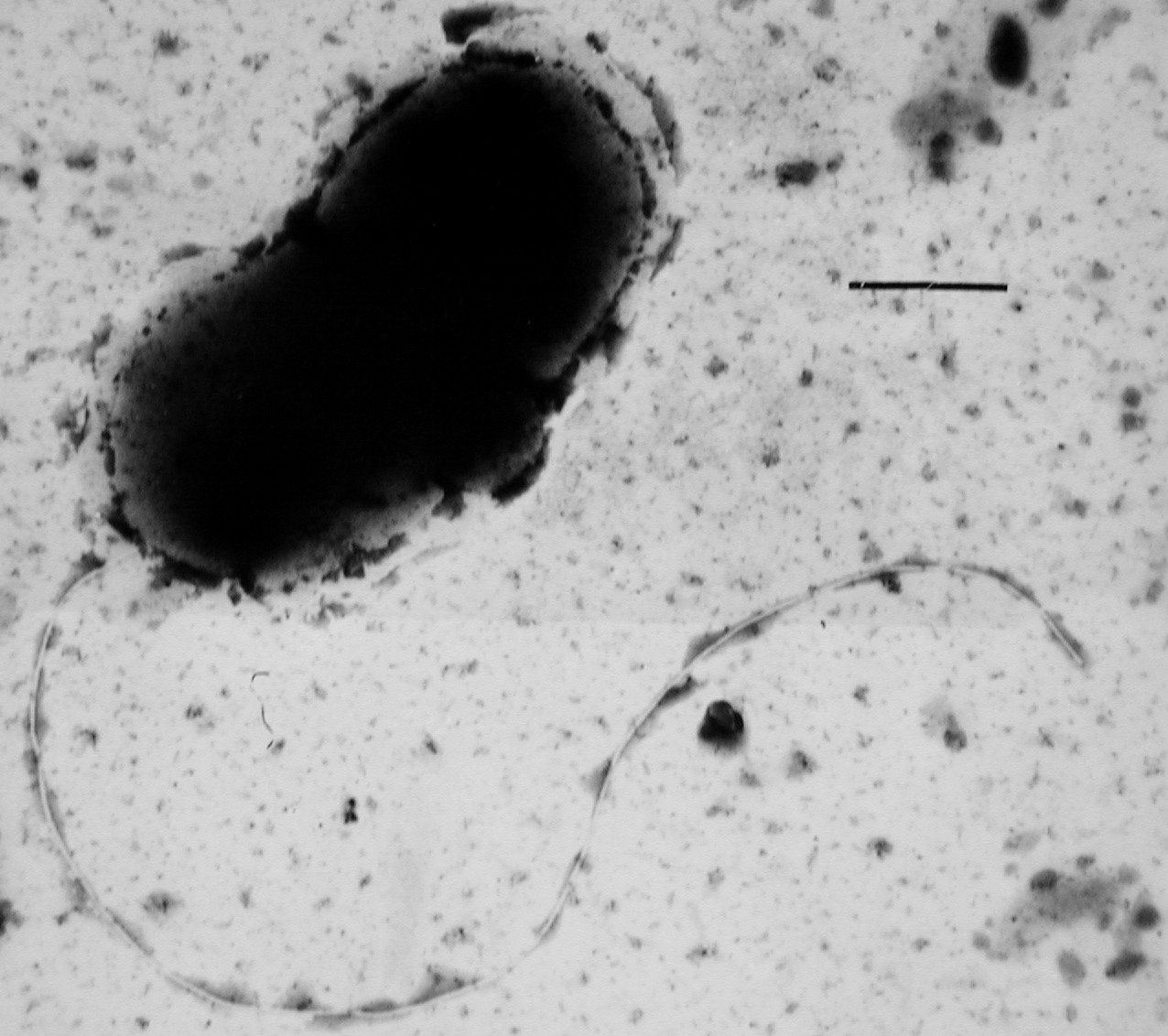
Nitratidesulfovibrio vulgaris

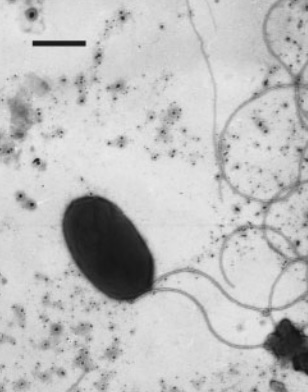
Caldimicrobium rimae

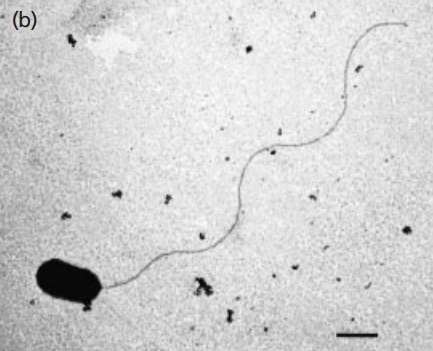
Thermodesulfobacterium hydrogeniphilum

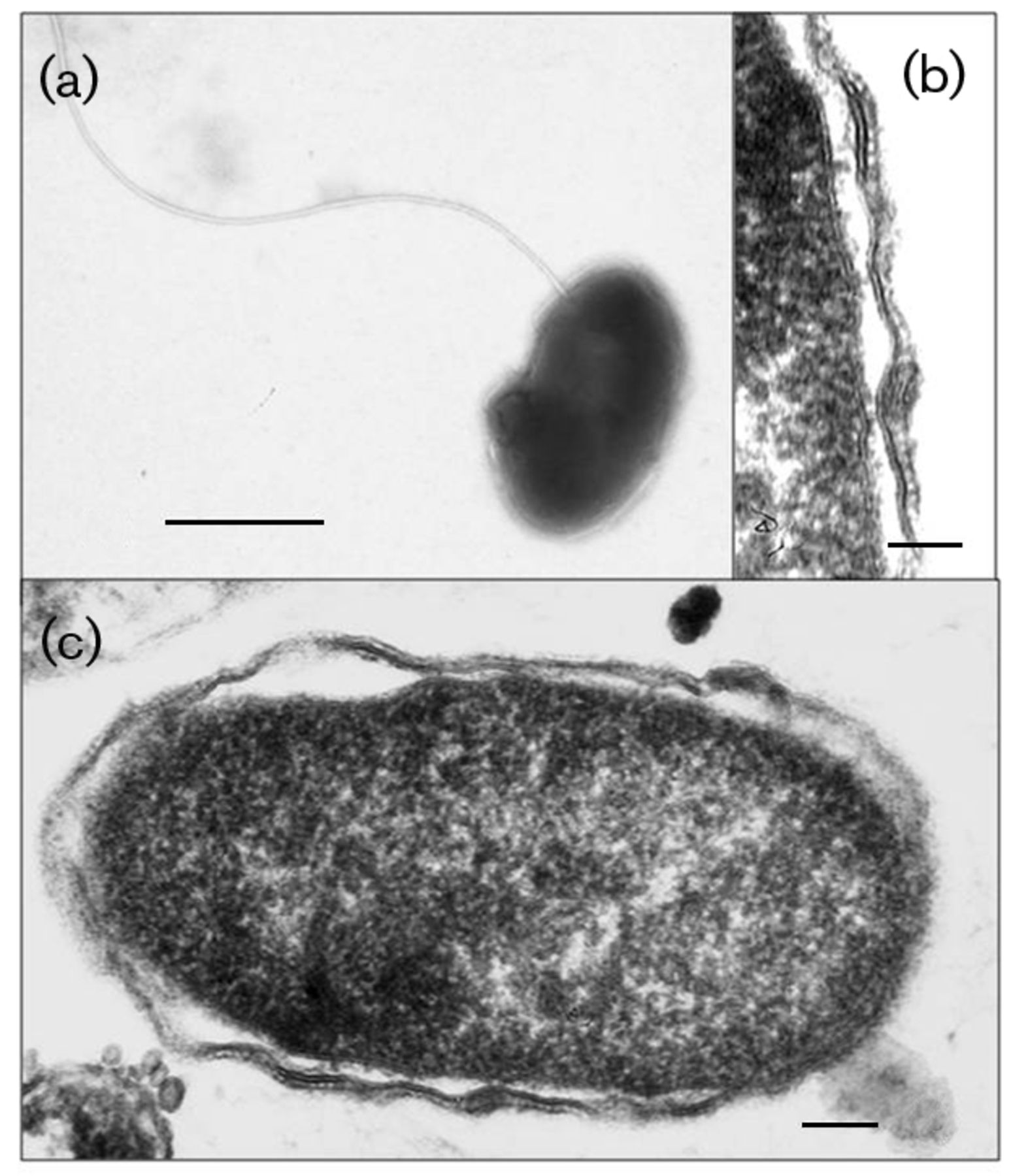
Dissulfuribacter thermophilus

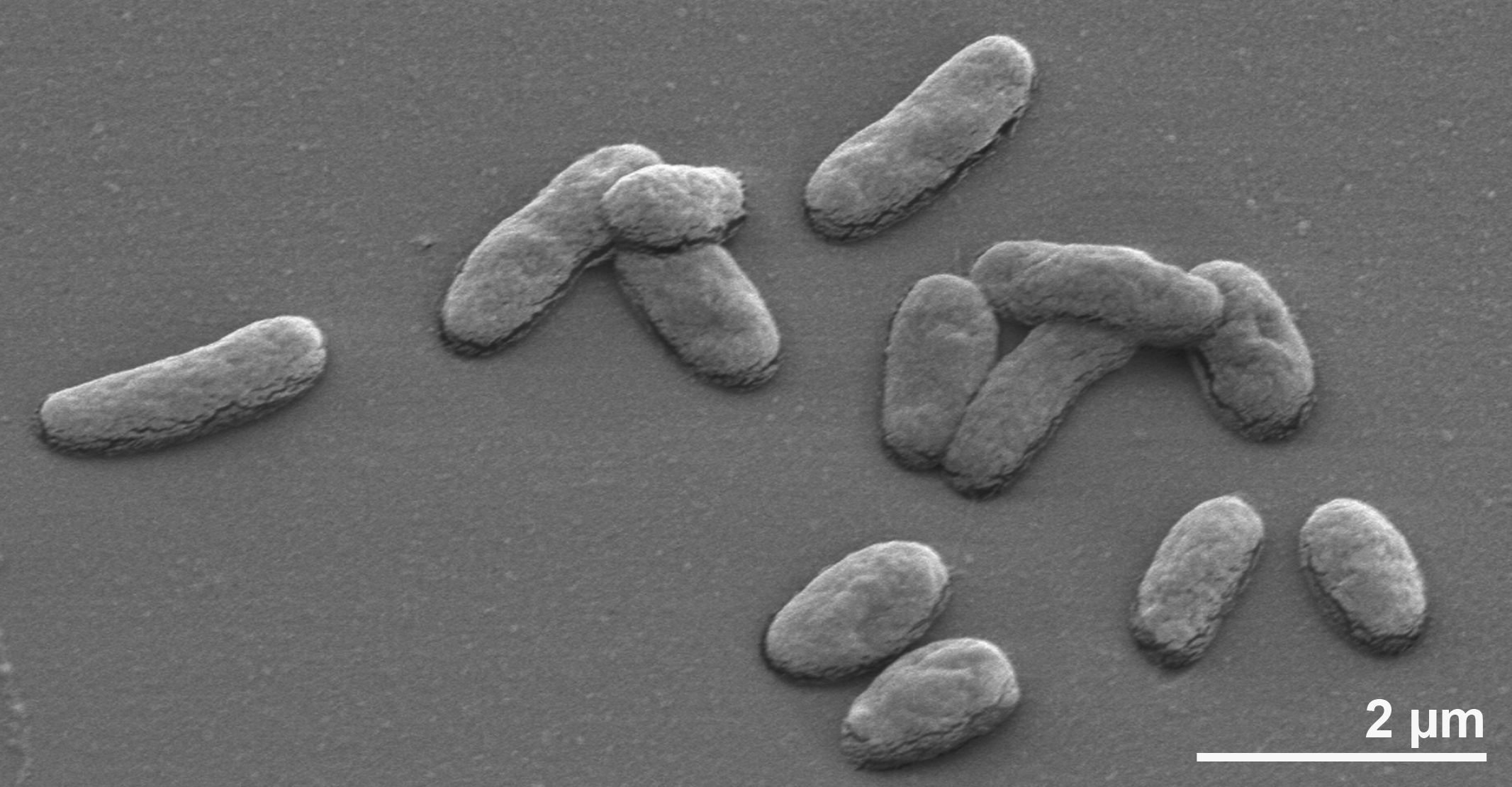
Thermodesulfatator indicus

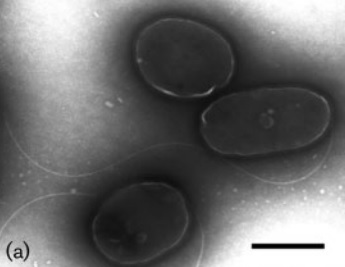
Thermosulfurimonas dismutans

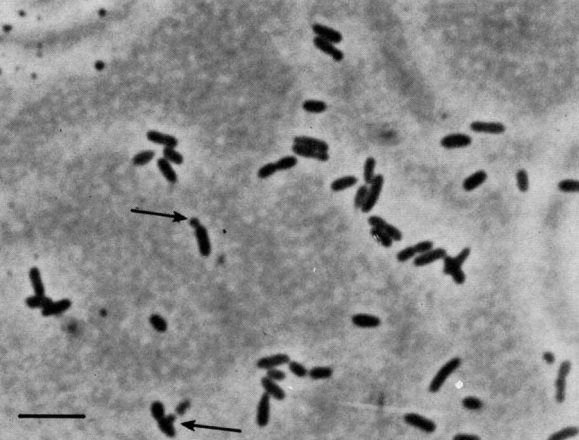
Thermodesulfobacterium commune

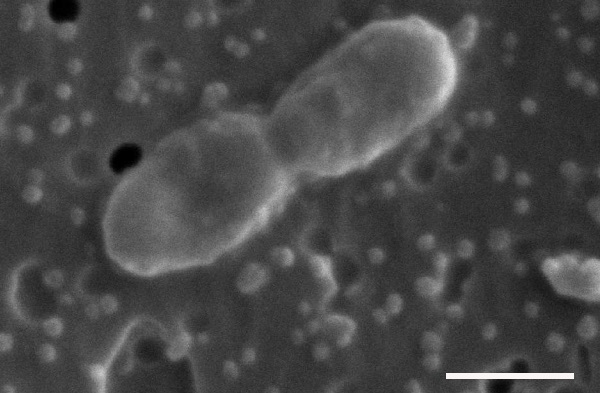
Thermodesulfatator atlanticus

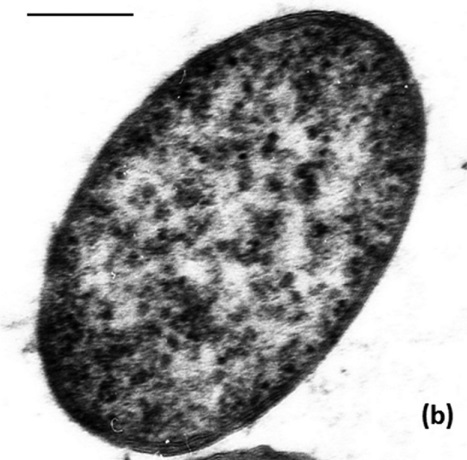
Thermosulfuriphilus ammonigenes

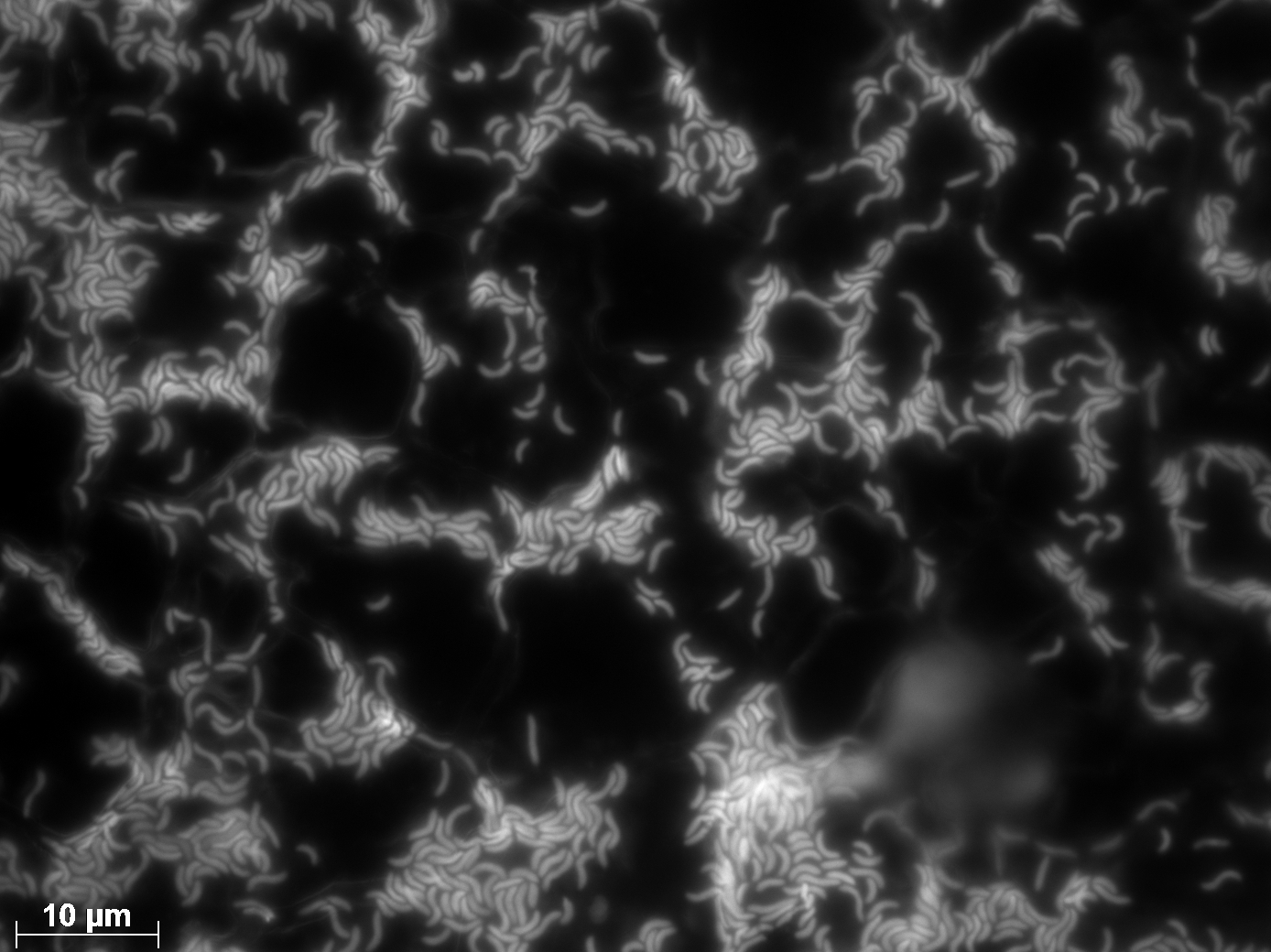
Oleidesulfovibrio alaskensis

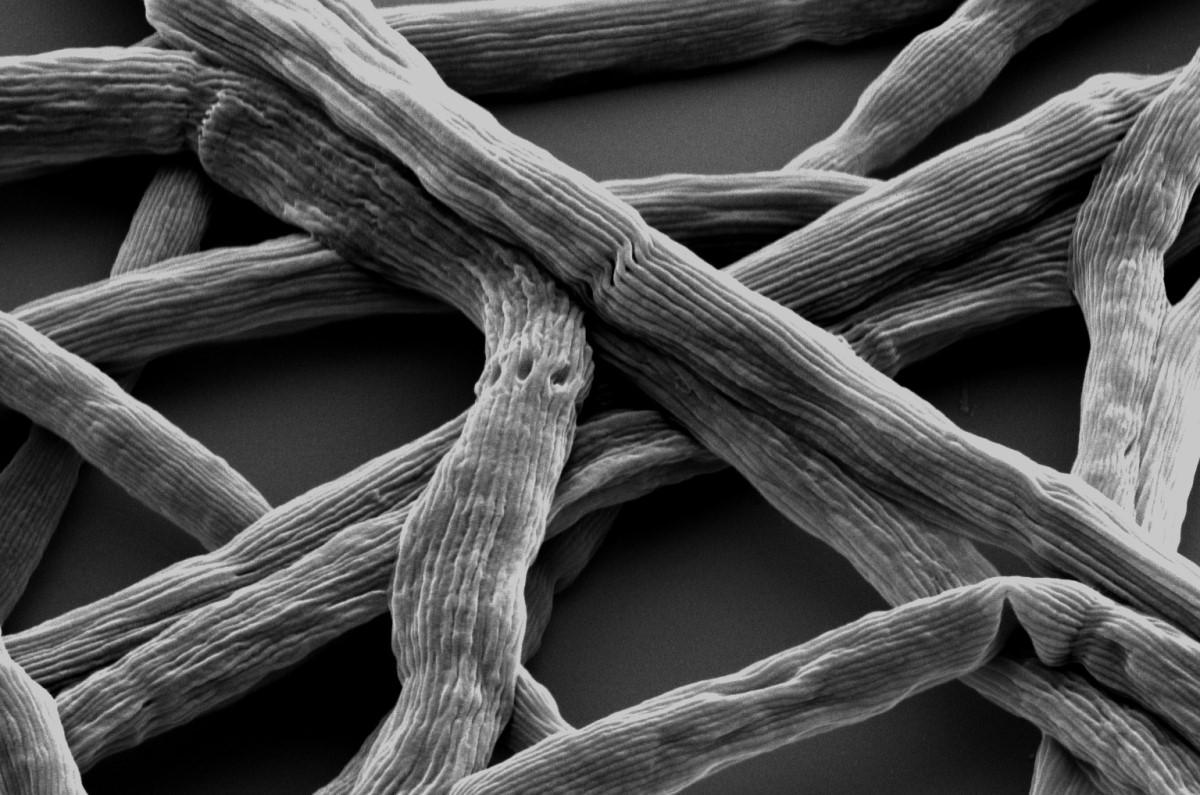
Ca. Electronema sp.

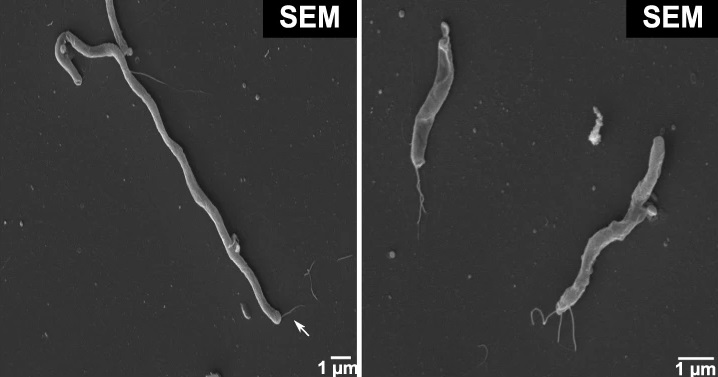
Taurinivorans muris

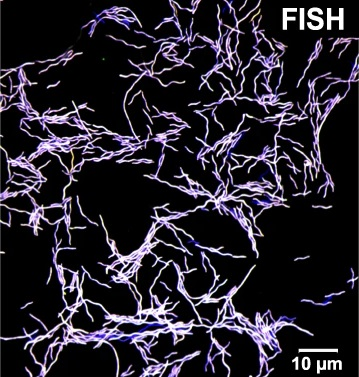
Taurinivorans muris

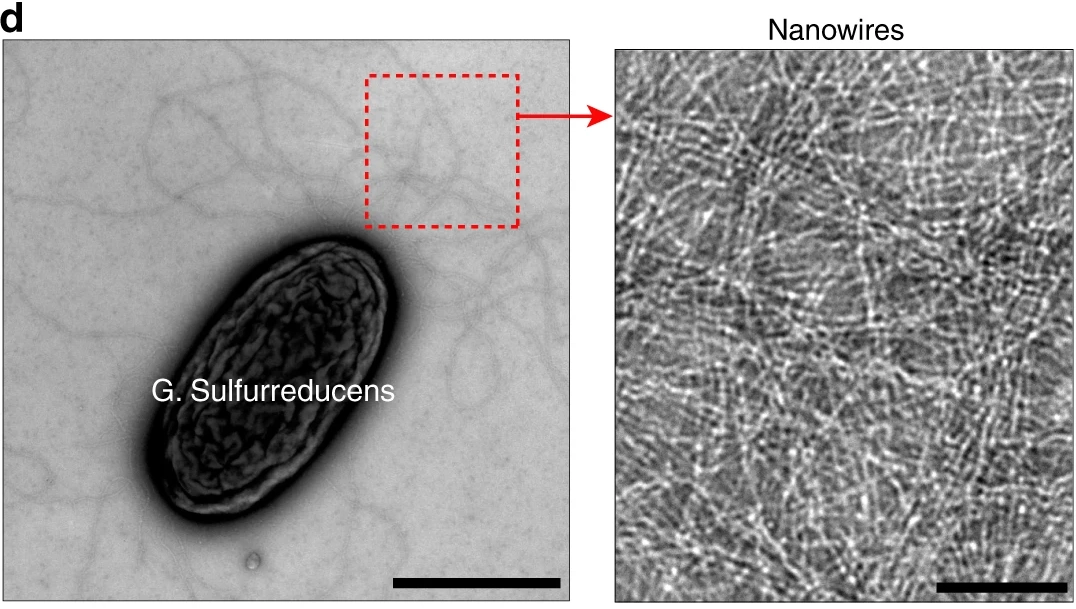
Geobacter sulfurreducens and its bacterial nanowires

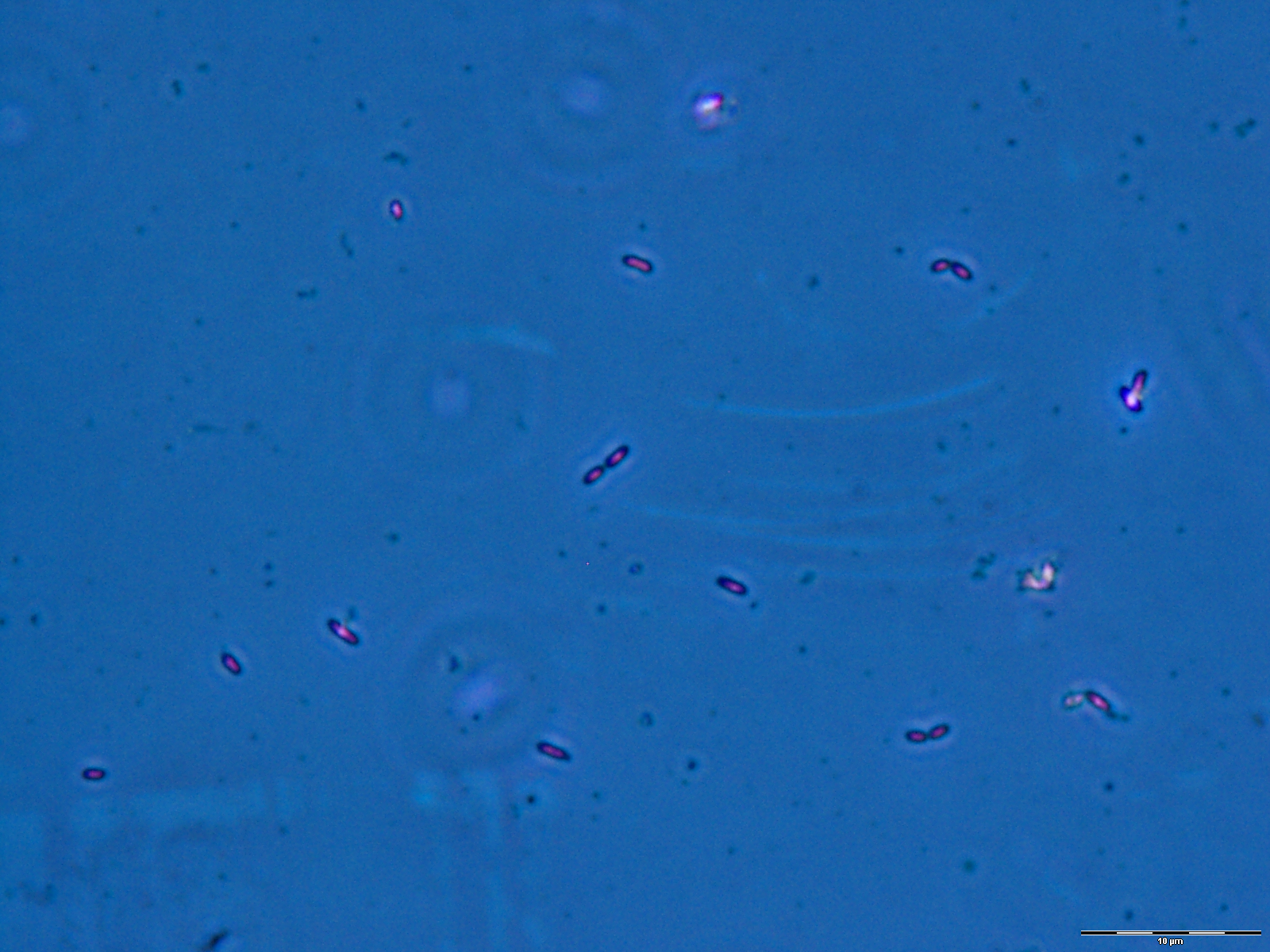
Geobacter sulfurreducens

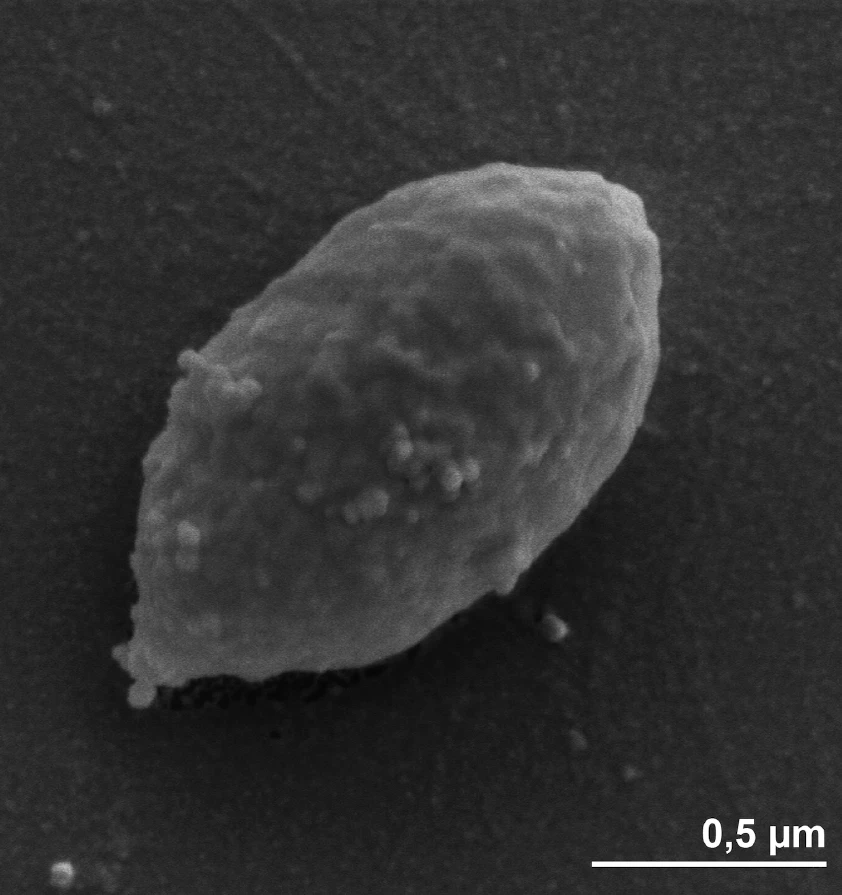
Desulfobulbus propionicus

== Phylogeny ==
The currently accepted taxonomy is based on the List of Prokaryotic names with Standing in Nomenclature (LPSN) and National Center for Biotechnology Information (NCBI).

Waite et al. 2020

- Thermodesulfo ‑bacteriota
  - - - Deferrisomatia
        Deferrisomatales
    - - "Dadaibacteria"
      - - Desulfuromonadia
          - Geobacterales
          - Desulfuromonadales
  - - - - Desulfomonilia
          Desulfomonilales
      - - Syntrophia
          Syntrophales
        - Syntrophorhabdia
          Syntrophorhabdales
    - - - - - Dissulfuribacteria
              Dissulfuribacterales
            - "Thermodesulfobacteriia"
              Thermodesulfobacteriales
          - - Desulfobulbia
              Desulfobulbales
        - - "Desulfofervidia"
            "Desulfofervidales"
          - Desulfovibrionia
            Desulfovibrionales
      - - - - Syntrophobacteria
              Syntrophobacterales
          - - Desulfobaccia
              Desulfobaccales
            - Desulfarculia
              - "Adiutricales"
              - Desulfarculales
        - - Desulfobacteria
            - Desulfatiglandales
            - Desulfobacterales

16S rRNA based LTP_10_2024

- Desulfobacterota G
  - Syntrophorhabdia
    Syntrophorhabdales

- - "Desulfuromonadota"
    - Desulfuromonadia
      - Geobacterales
      - Desulfuromonadales

- - Desulfobacterota_A
    - Desulfovibrionia
      Desulfovibrionales

- - "Desulfatiglandia"
    Desulfatiglandales

- - Desulfomonilia
    Desulfomonilales
  - Syntrophia
    Syntrophales

- - Desulfobacterota
    - Desulfobacteria
      Desulfobacterales

- - Thermodesulfobacteriota
    - "Thermodesulfobacteriia"
      Thermodesulfobacteriales

- - - Desulfobaccia
      Desulfobaccales
    - Dissulfuribacteria
      Dissulfuribacterales
  - - - Desulfarculia
        Desulfarculales
      - Syntrophobacteria
        Syntrophobacterales
    - - Desulfobulbia
        Desulfobulbales

- - "Deferrisomatota"
    - Deferrisomatia
      Deferrisomatales

120 marker proteins based GTDB 10-RS226

- - - Desulfobacterota_G
      - Syntrophorhabdia
        Syntrophorhabdales
    - "Acidulodesulfobacteriota" (SZUA‑79)
      - "Acidulodesulfobacteriia"
        "Acidulidesulfobacterales"
  - - - "Dadaibacteriota" (Desulfobacterota_D)
        - "Dadaibacteriia"
          - "Mycalebacteriaceae" {GCA-014075295}
          - "Nemesobacterales"
    - other

- - - "Deferrimicrobiota" (Desulfobacterota_E)
      - "Deferrimicrobiia"
        "Deferrimicrobiales"
  - - - - "Deferrisomatota" (Desulfobacterota_C)
          - Deferrisomatia
            Deferrisomatales
      - "Lernaellota"
    - - - "Binatota" (Desulfobacterota_B)
          - "Binatia"
            "Binatales"
      - Myxococcota

- Thermodesulfo ‑bacteriota
  - - - "Zymogenia"
        "Zymogenales"
    - - "Anaeroferrophilia"
        "Anaeroferrophilales"
      - Desulfuromonadia
        - Geobacterales
        - Desulfuromonadales
  - - - Syntrophia
        Syntrophales
    - - - Desulfomonilia
          Desulfomonilales
      - - - - "Desulfofervidia"
              "Desulfofervidales"
            - "Desulfatiglandia"
              Desulfatiglandales
          - - - Dissulfuribacteria
                Dissulfuribacterales
              - "Thermodesulfobacteriia"
                Thermodesulfobacteriales
            - - Desulfobulbia
                Desulfobulbales
        - - - Syntrophobacteria
              Syntrophobacterales
          - - - Desulfobaccia
                Desulfobaccales
              - Desulfarculia
                - "Adiutricales"
                - Desulfarculales
            - - Desulfobacteria
                Desulfobacterales

- "Desulfovibrionota" (Desulfobacterota_I)
  - Desulfovibrionia
    Desulfovibrionales

Unassigned genera:

- "Algidimarina" Kendall et al. 2005a
- "Desulfocaldus" Thevenieau et al. 2004
- "Desulfostipes" Myhr, Thorbjornsen & Torsvik 2000
- "Candidatus Phosphitivorax" Figueroa et al. 2018
- "Desulfocorpusculia" Slobodkina et al. 2025
  - "Desulfocorpusculales" Slobodkina et al. 2025
    - "Desulfocorpusculaceae" Slobodkina et al. 2025
      - "Candidatus Desulfocorpusculum" Slobodkina et al. 2025

== See also ==
- Bacterial nanowires
- Cable bacteria
- Exoelectrogen
- List of bacterial orders
- List of bacteria genera
- Sulfate reducing bacteria
- Sulfur cycle
- Syntrophy
- Thermophile
