= Desulfobacter curvatus =

Scientific classification
- Domain: Bacteria
- Kingdom: Pseudomonadati
- Phylum: Thermodesulfobacteriota
- Class: Desulfobacteria
- Order: Desulfobacterales
- Family: Desulfobacteraceae
- Genus: Desulfobacter
- Species: D. curvatus

Binomial name
- Desulfobacter curvatus Widdel 1988

Species of bacterium

Desulfobacter curvatus is a sulfate-reducing bacteria, with type strain AcRM3.
