= Desulfobacter hydrogenophilus =

Scientific classification
- Domain: Bacteria
- Kingdom: Pseudomonadati
- Phylum: Thermodesulfobacteriota
- Class: Desulfobacteria
- Order: Desulfobacterales
- Family: Desulfobacteraceae
- Genus: Desulfobacter
- Species: D. hydrogenophilus

Binomial name
- Desulfobacter hydrogenophilus Widdell, 1987

Species of bacterium

Desulfobacter hydrogenophilus is a strictly anaerobic sulfate-reducing bacterium. It was isolated and characterized in 1987 by Friedrich Widdel of the University of Konstanz (Germany). Like most sulfate-reducing bacteria (SRB), D. hydrogenophilus is capable of completely oxidizing organic compounds (specifically acetate, pyruvate and ethanol) to CO_{2}, and therefore plays a key role in biomineralization in anaerobic marine environments. However, unlike many SRB, D. hydrogenophilus is a facultative lithoautotroph, and can grow using H_{2} as an electron donor and CO_{2} as a carbon source. D. hydrogenophilus is also unique because it is psychrophilic (and has been shown to grow at temperatures as low as 0 °C or 32 °F). It is also diazotrophic, or capable of fixing nitrogen.

== Cell structure ==
Cells are elongated-oval shaped, and 1–1.3 by 2–3 μm in size. They are non-motile, gram-negative, and non-sporulating.

== Metabolism ==
Desulfobacter hydrogenophilus is the only described species of Desulfobacter that can grow chemolithoautotrophically. Using H_{2} as an electron donor and CO_{2} as a carbon source, D. hydrogenophilus reduces sulfate, SO_{4}^{2−} (and also sulfite, SO_{3}^{2−}, and thiosulfate, S_{2}O_{3}^{2−}) to sulfide, S^{2−}. However, D. hydrogenophilus is a facultative lithoautotroph, and may also use acetate, pyruvate, or ethanol as both an electron donor and carbon source. A modified tricarboxylic acid (TCA) cycle is employed for acetate metabolism and autotrophic growth. When D. hydrogenophilus is grown with either H_{2} or acetate, doubling time is less than 30 hours, but when grown with pyruvate or ethanol, doubling time is over 30 hours. The shortest doubling time observed on acetate was 18 hours.

Butyrate cannot be used as an electron donor, and neither elemental sulfur, S^{0}, nor nitrate, NO^{3−}, can be used as electron acceptors. Fermentative growth has not been observed.

Diazotrophic growth was observed in D. hydrogenophilus. Other Desulfobacter strains have also exhibited diazotrophic growth, but D. hydrogenophilus has exhibited the fastest diazotrophic growth rates of all the strains. D. hydrogenophilus’ doubling time with N_{2} as the nitrogen source was 36 hours, whereas other strains grew with a doubling time of 50 hours or more.

== Ecology ==
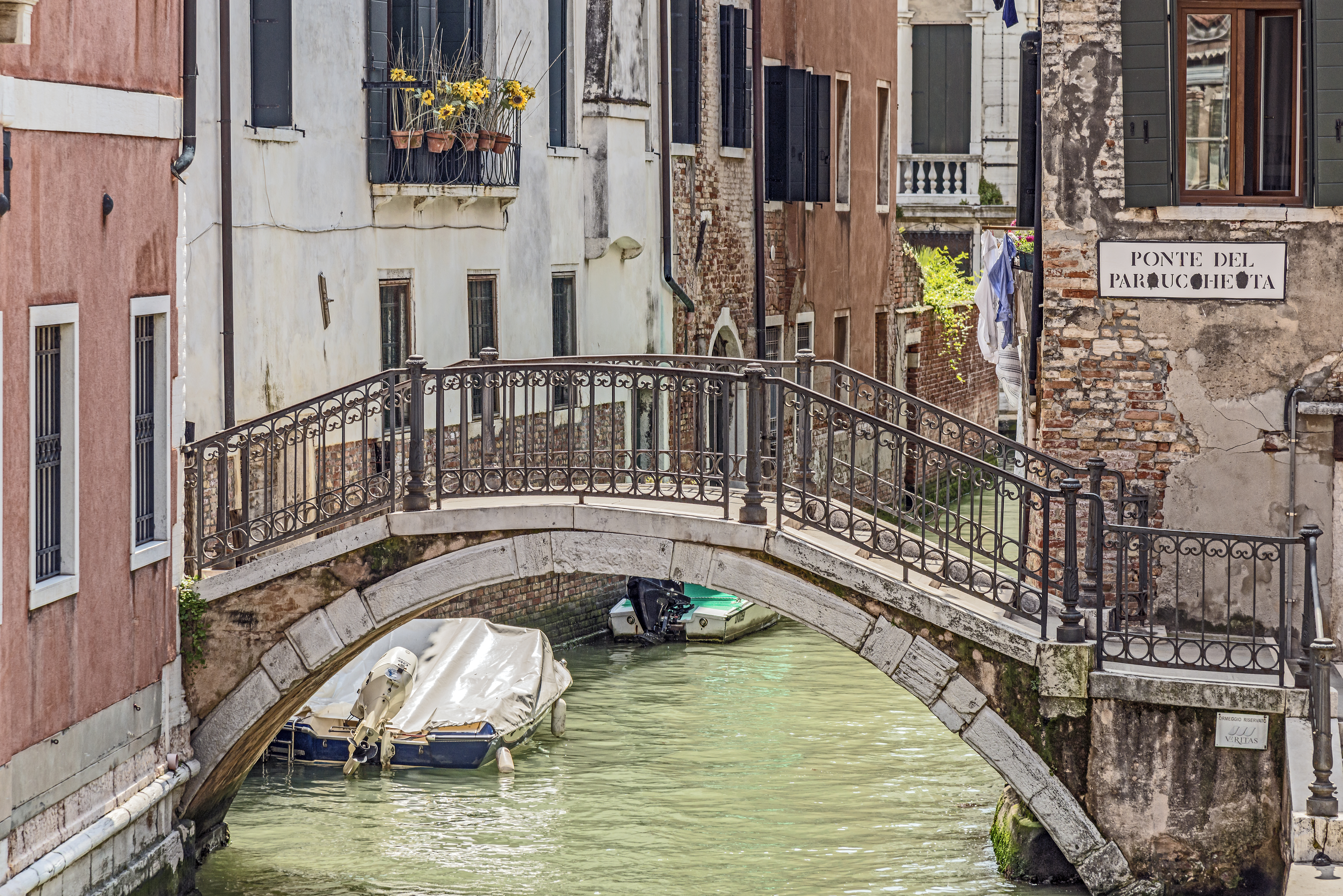
Bridge over the Rio di San Giacomo dell'Orio in Venice

The strain AcRS1, which was isolated for the enrichment culture used to describe the species in 1986, was taken from Rio di San Giacomo in Venice, Italy.

Desulfobacter hydrogenophilus is most commonly found in anoxic brackish or marine sediments, but has also been found in anoxic freshwater sediments and in activated sludge.

Desulfobacter hydrogenophilus is ecologically unique in that it has a wide temperature and pH range. Unlike any other species in its genus, D. hydrogenophilus is psychrophilic, or capable of growth and reproduction at cold temperatures. Slow growth on acetate with a doubling time of 5 weeks still occurred at 0 °C in an ice water bath. Its optimum growth temperature is 29–32 °C (84–90 °F), but growth occurs at temperatures of 0–35 °C (32–95 °F). Optimum pH is 6.6–7.0, but growth occurs at pH values of 5.5–7.6.

== Genome ==
Guanine and cytosine were found to make up 44.6% of D. hydrogenophilus DNA sequences.

== Biomarkers ==
The fatty acid methyl esters (FAME) detected in D. hydrogenophilus consist of a wide variety of structures, including normal, branched and unsaturated FAME 14 to 19 carbon atoms long, with a greater variety of FAME when grown with acetate. Cis-9,10-methylenehexadecanoic acid and 10-methylhexadecanoic acid have been considered biomarkers for D. hydrogenophilus. However, the relative amount of these fatty acids decreases substantially at cold temperatures. This has led to the concern about their reliability as biomarkers in cold environments, and has prompted further research in this area.

The δ^{13}C values of individual fatty acids can be useful for interpreting carbon utilization by D. hydrogenophilus in natural environments. Fatty acid δ^{13}C values were more depleted relative to biomass under heterotrophic (−13.3‰) than under autotrophic (−11.8‰) growth conditions.
