= Desulfobacter latus =

Scientific classification
- Domain: Bacteria
- Kingdom: Pseudomonadati
- Phylum: Thermodesulfobacteriota
- Class: Desulfobacteria
- Order: Desulfobacterales
- Family: Desulfobacteraceae
- Genus: Desulfobacter
- Species: D. latus'

Binomial name
- Desulfobacter latus' Widdel 1988

Species of bacterium

Desulfobacter latus is a sulfate-reducing bacteria, with type strain AcRS2.
