= Desulfatiferula olefinivorans =

Desulfatiferula berrensis

Scientific classification
- Domain: Bacteria
- Kingdom: Pseudomonadati
- Phylum: Thermodesulfobacteriota
- Class: Desulfobacteria
- Order: Desulfobacterales
- Family: Desulfobacteraceae
- Genus: Desulfatiferula
- Species: D. olefinivorans

Binomial name
- Desulfatiferula olefinivorans Cravo-Laureau et al. 2007

Type strain
- DSM 18843, JCM 14469, LM2801

Synonyms
- Desulfatibacillus olefinivorans

Species of bacterium

Desulfatiferula olefinivorans is a Gram-negative, sulfate-reducing, long-chain alkene-degrading and motile bacterium from the genus of Desulfatiferula which has been isolated from oil-polluted sediments from Berre Lagoon in France.
