= Desulfonema =

Scientific classification
- Domain: Bacteria
- Kingdom: Pseudomonadati
- Phylum: Proteobacteria
- Class: Desulfobacteria
- Order: Desulfobacterales
- Family: Desulfococcaceae
- Genus: Desulfonema; Widdel 1981

Type species
- Desulfonema limicola Widdel 1981

Species
- D. ishimotonii; D. limicola; D. magnum

Genus of bacteria

Desulfonema is a Gram-negative bacteria genus from the family Desulfococcaceae.

== Phylogeny ==
The currently accepted taxonomy is based on the List of Prokaryotic names with Standing in Nomenclature (LPSN) and National Center for Biotechnology Information (NCBI).

16S rRNA based LTP_10_2024

- Desulfococcaceae
  - Desulfonema ishimotonii corrig. Fukui et al. 2000
  - - Desulfonema magna Widdel 1981
    - - Desulfonema limicola Widdel 1981
      - Desulfococcus

120 marker proteins based GTDB 10-RS226

- - 4be13
    Desulfonema magna
  - Desulfococcaceae
    - Desulfonema limicola
    - - Desulfonema ishimotonii
      - Desulfococcus

== See also ==
- List of bacterial orders
- List of bacteria genera
