= Desulfofaba gelida =

Scientific classification
- Domain: Bacteria
- Kingdom: Pseudomonadati
- Phylum: Thermodesulfobacteriota
- Class: Desulfobacteria
- Order: Desulfobacterales
- Family: Desulfobacteraceae
- Genus: Desulfofaba
- Species: D. gelida

Binomial name
- Desulfofaba gelida Knoblauch et al. 1999

Type strain
- DSM 12344, PSv29

Species of bacterium

Desulfofaba gelida is a Gram-negative, sulfate-reducing and psychrophilic bacterium from the genus Desulfofaba which has been isolated from marine mud from Hornsund in Norway.
