= Desulfatiferula berrensis =

Scientific classification
- Domain: Bacteria
- Kingdom: Pseudomonadati
- Phylum: Thermodesulfobacteriota
- Class: Desulfobacteria
- Order: Desulfobacterales
- Family: Desulfobacteraceae
- Genus: Desulfatiferula
- Species: D. berrensis

Binomial name
- Desulfatiferula berrensis Hakil et al. 2014

Type strain
- BE2801, DSM 25524, JCM 18157

Synonyms
- Desulfatiferula berrense

Species of bacterium

Desulfatiferula berrensis is a Gram-negative, alkene-degrading, sulfate-reducing and motile bacterium from the genus of Desulfatiferula which has been isolated from oil-polluted sediments from Berre Lagoon in France.
