= Desulfoconvexum algidum =

Scientific classification
- Domain: Bacteria
- Kingdom: Pseudomonadati
- Phylum: Thermodesulfobacteriota
- Class: Desulfobacteria
- Order: Desulfobacterales
- Family: Desulfobacteraceae
- Genus: Desulfoconvexum
- Species: D. algidum

Binomial name
- Desulfoconvexum algidum Könneke et al. 2013

Type strain
- DSM 21856, JCM 16085, JHA1

Species of bacterium

Desulfoconvexum algidum is a psychrophilic, strictly anaerobic and sulfate-reducing bacterium from the genus of Desulfoconvexum which has been isolated from cold marine sediments from Smeerenburgfjorden in Norway.
