= Desulfatitalea tepidiphila =

Scientific classification
- Domain: Bacteria
- Kingdom: Pseudomonadati
- Phylum: Thermodesulfobacteriota
- Class: Desulfobacteria
- Order: Desulfobacterales
- Family: Desulfosarcinaceae
- Genus: Desulfatitalea
- Species: D. tepidiphila

Binomial name
- Desulfatitalea tepidiphila Higashioka et al. 2013

Type strain
- DSM 23472, NBRC 107166, S28bF, S28OL1, S28OL2

Species of bacterium

Desulfatitalea tepidiphila is a Gram-negative and sulfate-reducing bacterium from the genus of Desulfatitalea which has been isolated from tidal flat sediments from the Tokyo Bay on Japan.
