= Desulfobacter halotolerans =

Scientific classification
- Domain: Bacteria
- Kingdom: Pseudomonadati
- Phylum: Thermodesulfobacteriota
- Class: Desulfobacteria
- Order: Desulfobacterales
- Family: Desulfobacteraceae
- Genus: Desulfobacter
- Species: D. halotolerans

Binomial name
- Desulfobacter halotolerans Brandt and Ingvorsen 1998

Species of bacterium

Desulfobacter halotolerans is a halotolerant, acetate-oxidizing, sulfate-reducing bacteria. It is mesophilic and rod-shaped, with type strain GSL-Ac1.
