= Desulfofrigus fragile =

Scientific classification
- Domain: Bacteria
- Kingdom: Pseudomonadati
- Phylum: Thermodesulfobacteriota
- Class: Desulfobacteria
- Order: Desulfobacterales
- Family: Desulfobacteraceae
- Genus: Desulfofrigus
- Species: D. fragile

Binomial name
- Desulfofrigus fragile Knoblauch et al. 1999

Species of bacterium

Desulfofrigus fragile is a species of bacterium. It is a psychrophilic Gram-negative and sulfate-reducing bacteria with type strain Lsv21^{T}.
