= Desulfosarcina ovata =

Scientific classification
- Domain: Bacteria
- Kingdom: Pseudomonadati
- Phylum: Thermodesulfobacteriota
- Class: Desulfobacteria
- Order: Desulfobacterales
- Family: Desulfosarcinaceae
- Genus: Desulfosarcina
- Species: D. ovata

Binomial name
- Desulfosarcina ovata Kuever et al. 2006

Type strain
- DSM 13228, JCM 12297, oXyS1

Species of bacterium

Desulfosarcina ovata is a bacterium from the genus of Desulfosarcina which has been isolated from seawater from an oil tank from Wilhelmshaven in Germany.
