= Desulfofaba fastidiosa =

Scientific classification
- Domain: Bacteria
- Kingdom: Pseudomonadati
- Phylum: Thermodesulfobacteriota
- Class: Desulfobacteria
- Order: Desulfobacterales
- Family: Desulfobacteraceae
- Genus: Desulfofaba
- Species: D. fastidiosa

Binomial name
- Desulfofaba fastidiosa Abildgaard et al. 2004

Type strain
- ATCC BAA-815, DSM 15249, P2

Synonyms
- Desulfofaba fastitudiosa

Species of bacterium

Desulfofaba fastidiosa is a bacterium from the genus Desulfofaba which has been isolated from sediments in Denmark.
