= Desulfocella halophila =

Scientific classification
- Domain: Bacteria
- Kingdom: Pseudomonadati
- Phylum: Thermodesulfobacteriota
- Class: Desulfobacteria
- Order: Desulfobacterales
- Family: Desulfobacteraceae
- Genus: Desulfocella
- Species: D. halophila

Binomial name
- Desulfocella halophila Brandt et al. 1999

Type strain
- ATCC 700426, CIP 106097, DSM 11763, GSL-But2

Species of bacterium

Desulfocella halophila is a halophilic bacterium from the genus of Desulfocella which has been isolated from sediments from the Great Salt Lake in the United States.
