= Desulfobacula toluolica =

Scientific classification
- Domain: Bacteria
- Kingdom: Pseudomonadati
- Phylum: Thermodesulfobacteriota
- Class: Desulfobacteria
- Order: Desulfobacterales
- Family: Desulfobacteraceae
- Genus: Desulfobacula
- Species: D. toluolica

Binomial name
- Desulfobacula toluolica Rabus et al. 2000

Type strain
- DSM 7467, Tol2

Species of bacterium

Desulfobacula toluolica is a Gram-negative, sulfate-reducing bacterium from the genus of Desulfobacula. It was isolated from marine mud in the United States.
