= Desulfobacula phenolica =

Scientific classification
- Domain: Bacteria
- Kingdom: Pseudomonadati
- Phylum: Thermodesulfobacteriota
- Class: Desulfobacteria
- Order: Desulfobacterales
- Family: Desulfobacteraceae
- Genus: Desulfobacula
- Species: D. phenolica

Binomial name
- Desulfobacula phenolica (Bak and Widdel 1988) Kuever et al. 2001

Synonyms
- Desulfobacterium phenolicum

Species of bacterium

Desulfobacula phenolica is a bacterium species in the genus Desulfobacula.

The specific epithet is from Neo-Latin noun phenol -olis, phenol; Latin feminine gender suff. -ica, suffix used with the sense of pertaining to; Neo-Latin feminine gender adjective phenolica, pertaining to phenol.
