= Desulfobotulus sapovorans =

Scientific classification
- Domain: Bacteria
- Kingdom: Pseudomonadati
- Phylum: Thermodesulfobacteriota
- Class: Desulfobacteria
- Order: Desulfobacterales
- Family: Desulfobacteraceae
- Genus: Desulfobotulus
- Species: D. sapovorans

Binomial name
- Desulfobotulus sapovorans (Widdel 1981) Kuever et al. 2009

Type strain
- "Lindhorst", 1 pa 3, 1pa3, ATCC 33892, DSM 2055, LMG 7857, VKM B-1803

Synonyms
- Desulfovibrio sapovorans

Species of bacterium

Desulfobotulus sapovorans is a bacterium from the genus of Desulfobotulus which has been isolated from freshwater mud in Germany. It lives best at moderate temperatures, similar to room temperature or body temperature, which means it is mesophilic. D. sapovorans thrives in environments without oxygen (anaerobic) and gets its energy through breaking down organic materials. Instead of using oxygen for this process, it uses sulfate, making it a sulfate-reducing bacteria (SRB). Sulfate-reducing bacteria play an important role in recycling nutrients in the environments where they live, including aquatic, freshwater, and mud environments where oxygen is limited.

== Taxonomy ==
Desulfobotus sapovorans is a mesophilic, sulfate-reducing bacterium belonging to the Desulfobacteraceae family within the Desulfobacterales order. The full taxonomic classification of Desulfobotulus sapovorans is structured as follows: Bacteria, Pseudomonadota, Thermodesulfobacteriota, Desulfobacteria, Desulfobacterales, Desulfobacteraceae, Desulfobotulus, Desulfobotulus sapovorans. Desulfobacteraceae contains 21 other genera, such as Desulfobacter, Desulfobacula, Desulfococcus, and Desulfofaba, with their taxonomic classification mainly based on 16S ribosomal RNA, genes used to build microbial phylogenies. Desulfobotus sapovorans is a strain that has been previously classified as "Desulfovibrio sapovorans".

== Neighboring strains and phylogenetic relationships ==
Within the Desulfobotulus genus, D. sapovorans is phylogenetically linked to Desulfobotulus alkaliphilus, Desulfobotulus pelophilus, and Desulfobotulus mexicanus. This means that it is genetically related to these other species in terms of evolutionary biology. This discovery was made by sequencing the 16s ribosomal RNA gene which scientists use to compare and identify different species of bacteria. The sequencing revealed the strain D. alkaliphilus is the nearest neighbor of D. sapovorans with a 85.29% similarity.

All of these strains share the sulfate-reducing capabilities of the Desulfobacteraceae family organisms, however, they thrive in different environments to which they are adapted to:

D. aklaliphilus is a sulfate-reducing bacterium discovered and isolated from sediments, material gathered at the bottom of water, of soda lakes in Kulunda Steppe, Russia. This strain (ASO4-4) is an alkaliphilic species that thrives in high pH environments and is involved in sulfur cycling under extreme conditions.

D. pelophilus is a sulfate-reducing bacterium that was first discovered and obtained from the Taman Peninsula, Russia in a land-based mud volcano. This strain (H1) is closely related to D. mexicanus according to analysis of the 16s rRNA gene sequence (98.3 percent similarity). The H1 strain of Desulfobotulus is anaerobic, lives in alkaline environments, or one with a pH of around 8.5 to 11(alkaliphilic), and is a Gram-negative strain.

D. mexicanus is a sulfate-reducing bacterium that was discovered and isolated from an alkaline crater lake in Guanajuato, Mexico. This strain (PAR22N) shares many similarities with D. sapovorans such as being anaerobic, Gram-negative, and non-spore forming, meaning it does not produce protective structures that some bacteria form to survive tough conditions. Unlike its relative strain, D. sapovorans, D. mexicanus is adapted to oceanic environments with high salt concentration and high pH. This strain grows with elemental sulfur, an insoluble form of sulfur that needs to be oxidized in order to be used. In contrast to both D. sapovorans and D. alkaliphilus that use sulfate, D.mexicanus uses elemental sulfur as the terminal electron acceptor.

== Discovery ==
Desulfobotulus sapovorans bacteria is derived from Desulfobotulus, first discovered and isolated in freshwater mud in West Germany, by Friedhelm Widdel in 1981. In research conducted on sulfate-reducing bacteria (SRBs), this bacterium was isolated from the marine sediments using anaerobic enrichment culture techniques. Samples rich in organic material like sulfate are often collected in coastal mud. By using an anaerobic enrichment culture technique, where samples are placed in oxygen-free media containing sulfate as an electron acceptor, the growth of SRB's are promoted. This particular strain was determined to be different from other Desulfobotulus by using different types of biochemical analyses that were often used for bacterial classification at the time. Microscopic observations of this bacteria had rod-shaped structures, and that unlike other SRBs they were motile which added to their distinguishing characteristics. It was found to completely oxidize fatty acids to carbon dioxide, while some other SRBs could only partially oxidize them. It was also confirmed to be an SRB since it used sulfate as the terminal electron acceptor, producing hydrogen sulfide, H_{2}S.

== Metabolism ==
D. sapovorans, similar to its family of Desulfobacteraceae, has a strict anaerobic respiratory metabolism. It is a sulfate-reducing bacterium which uses sulfate as its terminal electron acceptor, which results in hydrogen sulfide as a metabolic product. It completely oxidizes fatty acids to carbon dioxide, CO_{2}, maintaining anaerobic carbon flow by degrading these fatty acids in the absence of carbon.

== Genomics ==
The genome of D. sapovorans, strain DSM 2055, has been sequenced by the DOE Joint Genome Institute (JGI) using Whole Genome Sequencing. This sequencing was done as part of the Genomic Encyclopedia of Type Strains, Phase I: the one thousand microbial genomes (KMG) project, with Nikos Kyrpides as the principal investigator. The species has 3509 total genes, 3423 of which are protein-coding genes, and 86 are RNA genes. The 16S rRNA sequence of the strain DSM 2055 has a sequence length of 1,553 base pairs. The genomic DNA guanine+cytosine number of bases is 53.52% of the total number of bases.

== Ecology ==
D. sapovorans, an anaerobic sulfate-reducing bacteria (SRB), plays an important role in both the carbon cycle and the sulfur cycle in marine ecosystems. The species within the Desulfobacteraceae family exhibit a strictly anaerobic lifestyle and are found within freshwater mud, marine sediments, and soda lakes. Its natural habitat is areas with little to no oxygen in marine sediments, rich in sulfate and other organic materials. Converting sulfate from the mud ecosystems into hydrogen sulfide increases the sulfide richness in sediments, which contributes to microbial interactions. Degradation of fatty acids in the absence of oxygen helps break down other organic material in the environment.

== Biological significance ==
The discovery of this organism is significant for several different reasons in the fields of microbiology and environmental science. This bacterium plays a role in breaking down fatty acids in areas that have been depleted of dissolved oxygen (anoxic environments), like freshwater muds, which is a key part in the recycling of carbon in marine sediments. Also, since it is confirmed to be an sulfate-reducing bacteria (SRB), it is known for its key role in the global sulfur cycle, which has to do with chemistry of the ocean and composition of sediments in these environments. It converts sulfate into hydrogen sulfide, which contributes to an increased acidity and causes potential corrosion in certain environments. SRBs like this one are now being studied for their potential in cleaning up oil spills and other pollutants, since they have the capability to break down hydrocarbons in anaerobic conditions. By finding a bacterium that is capable of converting these toxic metals into insoluble forms, heavy metal contamination could be reduced by preventing further spread into the environment. This discovery also contributes to the known taxonomic tree of Desulfobotulus, and increases our knowledge of the microbial diversity in these environments. Connections are also able to be made between other SRBs and their interactions within microbial communities.
