= Desulfobotulus alkaliphilus =

Scientific classification
- Domain: Bacteria
- Kingdom: Pseudomonadati
- Phylum: Thermodesulfobacteriota
- Class: Desulfobacteria
- Order: Desulfobacterales
- Family: Desulfobacteraceae
- Genus: Desulfobotulus
- Species: D. alkaliphilus

Binomial name
- Desulfobotulus alkaliphilus Sorokin et al. 2010

Type strain
- ASO4-4, DSM 22078, UNIQEM U759

Species of bacterium

Desulfobotulus alkaliphilus is a bacterium from the genus of Desulfobotulus which has been isolated from sediments from a soda lake from the Kulunda Steppe in Russia.
