= Desulfobacter vibrioformis =

Scientific classification
- Domain: Bacteria
- Kingdom: Pseudomonadati
- Phylum: Thermodesulfobacteriota
- Class: Desulfobacteria
- Order: Desulfobacterales
- Family: Desulfobacteraceae
- Genus: Desulfobacter
- Species: D. vibrioformis

Binomial name
- Desulfobacter vibrioformis Lien and Beeder 1997

Species of bacterium

Desulfobacter vibrioformis is a sulfate-reducing bacteria. It is mesophilic, gram-negative, vibrio-shaped, marine and acetate-oxidizing.
