= Desulfococcus biacutus =

Scientific classification
- Domain: Bacteria
- Kingdom: Pseudomonadati
- Phylum: Proteobacteria
- Class: Desulfobacteria
- Order: Desulfobacterales
- Family: Desulfococcaceae
- Genus: Desulfococcus
- Species: D. biacutus

Binomial name
- Desulfococcus biacutus Platen et al. 1991

Type strain
- DSM 5651, KMRActS

Species of bacterium

Desulfococcus biacutus is a Gram-negative and strictly anaerobic bacterium from the genus Desulfococcus which has been isolated from anaerobic digestor sludge in Germany.
