= Desulfococcus multivorans =

Scientific classification
- Domain: Bacteria
- Kingdom: Pseudomonadati
- Phylum: Thermodesulfobacteriota
- Class: Desulfobacteria
- Order: Desulfobacterales
- Family: Desulfococcaceae
- Genus: Desulfococcus
- Species: D. multivorans

Binomial name
- Desulfococcus multivorans Widdel 1981

Type strain
- "Göttingen", 1be1, ATCC 33890, DSM 2059, G&#246, KCTC 2420, KCTC 4005, NCIMB 12965, ttingen

Species of bacterium

Desulfococcus multivorans is a sulfate-reducing bacterium from the genus Desulfococcus which has been isolated from a sewage digester in Germany.
