= Desulfosarcina alkanivorans =

Scientific classification
- Domain: Bacteria
- Kingdom: Pseudomonadati
- Phylum: Thermodesulfobacteriota
- Class: Desulfobacteria
- Order: Desulfobacterales
- Family: Desulfosarcinaceae
- Genus: Desulfosarcina
- Species: D. alkanivorans

Binomial name
- Desulfosarcina alkanivorans Watanabe et al. 2017

Type strain
- DSM 103901, JCM 31728, strain PL12

Species of bacterium

Desulfosarcina alkanivorans is a hydrocarbon-degrading bacterium from the genus of Desulfosarcina which has been isolated from oil contaminated marine sediments from Shuaiba in Kuwait.
