= Desulfobacter =

Scientific classification
- Domain: Bacteria
- Kingdom: Pseudomonadati
- Phylum: Thermodesulfobacteriota
- Class: Desulfobacteria
- Order: Desulfobacterales
- Family: Desulfobacteraceae
- Genus: Desulfobacter; Widdel 1981

Type species
- Desulfobacter postgatei Widdel 1981

Species
- D. curvatus; D. halotolerans; D. hydrogenophilus; D. latus; D. postgatei; "D. psychrotolerans"; D. vibrioformis

Genus of bacteria

Desulfobacter is a genus of bacteria from the family Desulfobacteraceae. Desulfobacter has the ability to oxidize acetate to CO_{2}.

== Phylogeny ==
The currently accepted taxonomy is based on the List of Prokaryotic names with Standing in Nomenclature (LPSN) and National Center for Biotechnology Information (NCBI).

16S rRNA based LTP_10_2024

- Desulfobacter
  - D. hydrogenophilus Widdel 1988
  - - - D. curvatus Widdel 1988
      - D. postgatei Widdel 1981
    - - D. vibrioformis Lien & Beeder 1997
      - - D. halotolerans Brandt & Ingvorsen 1998
        - D. latus Widdel 1988

120 marker proteins based GTDB 10-RS226

- Desulfobacter
  - D. vibrioformis
  - - D. postgatei
    - - D. curvatus
      - - D. hydrogenophilus
        - D. latus

== See also ==
- List of bacterial orders
- List of bacteria genera
