= Desulfofaba =

Scientific classification
- Domain: Bacteria
- Kingdom: Pseudomonadati
- Phylum: Thermodesulfobacteriota
- Class: Desulfobacteria
- Order: Desulfobacterales
- Family: Desulfobacteraceae
- Genus: Desulfofaba; Knoblauch et al. 1999

Type species
- Desulfofaba gelida Knoblauch et al. 1999

Species
- D. fastidiosa; D. gelida; D. hansenii

Synonyms
- "Desulfoliva" Galushko & Kuever 2020; Desulfomusa Finster, Thomsen & Ramsing 2001; Pseudodesulfobulbus

Genus of bacteria

Desulfofaba is a Gram-negative, anaerobic, non-spore-forming and motile bacteria genus from the family Desulfobacteraceae.

== Phylogeny ==
The currently accepted taxonomy is based on the List of Prokaryotic names with Standing in Nomenclature (LPSN) and National Center for Biotechnology Information (NCBI).

16S rRNA based LTP_10_2024

- Desulfofaba
  - D. fastidiosa corrig. Fukui et al. 2000
  - - D. gelida Knoblauch et al. 1999
    - D. hansenii (Finster, Thomsen & Ramsing 2001) Abildgaard, Ramsing & Finster 2004

== See also ==
- List of bacterial orders
- List of bacteria genera
