= Desulfobacterium catecholicum =

Scientific classification
- Domain: Bacteria
- Kingdom: Pseudomonadati
- Phylum: Thermodesulfobacteriota
- Class: Desulfobacteria
- Order: Desulfobacterales
- Family: Desulfobacteriaceae
- Genus: Desulfobacterium
- Species: D. catecholicum

Binomial name
- Desulfobacterium catecholicum Szewzyk and Pfennig 1988

Synonyms
- Desulfocastanea catecholica (Szewzyk & Pfennig 1988) Galushko & Kuever 2021

Species of bacterium

Desulfobacterium catecholicum is a catechol-degrading lemon-shaped non-sporing sulfate-reducing bacterium. Its type strain is Nzva20.
