= Desulfococcus =

Scientific classification
- Domain: Bacteria
- Kingdom: Pseudomonadati
- Phylum: Thermodesulfobacteriota
- Class: Desulfobacteria
- Order: Desulfobacterales
- Family: Desulfococcaceae
- Genus: Desulfococcus; Widdel 1981

Type species
- Desulfococcus multivorans Widdel 1981

Species
- D. biacutus; D. multivorans; "D. oleovorans"

Genus of bacteria

Desulfococcus is a Gram-negative, anaerobic and motile bacteria genus from the family Desulfococcaceae.

== Phylogeny ==
The currently accepted taxonomy is based on the List of Prokaryotic names with Standing in Nomenclature (LPSN) and National Center for Biotechnology Information (NCBI).

16S rRNA based LTP_10_2024

- Desulfococcus
  - D. biacutus Platen et al. 1991
  - D. multivorans Widdel 1981

120 marker proteins based GTDB 10-RS226

- Desulfococcus
  D. multivorans

== See also ==
- List of bacterial orders
- List of bacteria genera
