= Desulfobacterium indolicum =

Scientific classification
- Domain: Bacteria
- Kingdom: Pseudomonadati
- Phylum: Thermodesulfobacteriota
- Class: Desulfobacteria
- Order: Desulfobacterales
- Family: Desulfobacteriaceae
- Genus: Desulfobacterium
- Species: D. indolicum

Binomial name
- Desulfobacterium indolicum Bak and Widdel 1988

Species of bacterium

Desulfobacterium indolicum is an oval to rod-shaped, Gram-negative, non-sporing sulfate-reducing bacterium. Its type strain is In04. It is notable for its use of particular metabolic pathways, including desulfurization of diesel.
