= Desulfofaba hansenii =

Scientific classification
- Domain: Bacteria
- Kingdom: Pseudomonadati
- Phylum: Thermodesulfobacteriota
- Class: Desulfobacteria
- Order: Desulfobacterales
- Family: Desulfobacteraceae
- Genus: Desulfofaba
- Species: D. hansenii

Binomial name
- Desulfofaba hansenii (Finster et al. 2001) Abildgaard et al. 2004

Type strain
- ATCC 700811, DSM 12642, P1

Synonyms
- Desulfomusa hansenii Pseudodesulfobulbus elegans

Species of bacterium

Desulfofaba hansenii is a bacterium from the genus Desulfofaba which has been isolated from the roots of the seagrass Zostera marina in Denmark.
