= Desulfotignum =

Scientific classification
- Domain: Bacteria
- Kingdom: Pseudomonadati
- Phylum: Thermodesulfobacteriota
- Class: Desulfobacteria
- Order: Desulfobacterales
- Family: Desulfobacteraceae
- Genus: Desulfotignum; Kuever et al. 2001

Type species
- Desulfotignum balticum Kuever et al. 2001

Species
- D. balticum; D. phosphitoxidans; D. toluenicum

Genus of bacteria

Desulfotignum is a genus of Gram-negative and strictly anaerobic bacteria with a single polar flagellum, within the Desulfobacteraceae family.

== Phylogeny ==
The currently accepted taxonomy is based on the List of Prokaryotic names with Standing in Nomenclature (LPSN) and National Center for Biotechnology Information (NCBI).

16S rRNA based LTP_08_2023

- Desulfotignum
  - D. balticum Kuever et al. 2001
  - - D. phosphitoxidans Schink et al. 2002
    - D. toluenicum Ommedal & Torsvik 2007

120 marker proteins based GTDB 10-RS226

- Desulfotignum
  - D. balticum
  - D. phosphitoxidans

== See also ==
- List of bacterial orders
- List of bacteria genera
