= Desulfatirhabdium butyrativorans =

Scientific classification
- Domain: Bacteria
- Kingdom: Pseudomonadati
- Phylum: Thermodesulfobacteriota
- Class: Desulfobacteria
- Order: Desulfobacterales
- Family: Desulfatirhabdiaceae
- Genus: Desulfatirhabdium
- Species: D. butyrativorans

Binomial name
- Desulfatirhabdium butyrativorans Balk et al. 2008

Type strain
- DSM 18734, HB1, JCM 14470

Species of bacterium

Desulfatirhabdium butyrativorans is a Gram-negative, sulfate-reducing and butyrate-oxidizing bacterium from the genus Desulfatirhabdium which has been isolated from anaerobic sludge in the Netherlands.
