= Desulfobacula =

Scientific classification
- Domain: Bacteria
- Kingdom: Pseudomonadati
- Phylum: Thermodesulfobacteriota
- Class: Desulfobacteria
- Order: Desulfobacterales
- Family: Desulfobacteraceae
- Genus: Desulfobacula; Rabus et al. 2000

Type species
- Desulfobacula toluolica Rabus et al. 2000

Species
- "Ca. D. maris"; D. phenolica; D. toluolica

Genus of bacteria

Desulfobacula is a bacterial genus in the family Desulfobacteraceae.

== Species ==
The genus contains 2 species (including basonyms and synonyms), namely:

- D. phenolica ( (Bak and Widdel 1988) Kuever et al. 2001; Neo-Latin noun phenol -olis, phenol; Latin feminine gender suff. -ica, suffix used with the sense of pertaining to; Neo-Latin feminine gender adjective phenolica, pertaining to phenol.)
- D. toluolica ( Rabus et al. 2000, (Type species of the genus).; Neo-Latin noun toluol (from Fr. or Sp. tolu, balsam from Santiago de Tolu), toluol, toluene; Latin feminine gender suff. -ica, suffix used with the sense of pertaining to; Neo-Latin feminine gender adjective toluolica, pertaining to toluene.)

== Phylogeny ==
The currently accepted taxonomy is based on the List of Prokaryotic names with Standing in Nomenclature (LPSN) and National Center for Biotechnology Information (NCBI).

16S rRNA based LTP_10_2024

- Desulfobacula
  - D. phenolica (Bak & Widdel 1988) Kuever et al. 2001
  - D. toluolica Rabus et al. 2000

120 marker proteins based GTDB 10-RS226

- Desulfobacula
  - "Ca. D. maris" Van Vliet et al. 2021
  - D. toluolica [incl. D. phenolica]

== See also ==
- List of bacterial orders
- List of bacteria genera
