= Desulfatibacillum aliphaticivorans =

Scientific classification
- Domain: Bacteria
- Kingdom: Pseudomonadati
- Phylum: Thermodesulfobacteriota
- Class: Desulfobacteria
- Order: Desulfobacterales
- Family: Desulfatibacillaceae
- Genus: Desulfatibacillum
- Species: D. aliphaticivorans

Binomial name
- Desulfatibacillum aliphaticivorans Cravo-Laureau et al. 2004

Type strain
- ATCC BAA-743, CV2803, DSM 15576

Synonyms
- Desulfobacillum aliphatovorans

Species of bacterium

Desulfatibacillum aliphaticivorans is a Gram-negative, non-spore-forming, sulfate-reducing and non-motile bacterium from the genus Desulfatibacillum which has been isolated from marine sediments from the Gulf of Fos in France. Desulfatibacillum aliphaticivorans has the ability to degrade n-alkanes and n-alkenes.
