= Desulfatibacillum alkenivorans =

Scientific classification
- Domain: Bacteria
- Kingdom: Pseudomonadati
- Phylum: Thermodesulfobacteriota
- Class: Desulfobacteria
- Order: Desulfobacterales
- Family: Desulfatibacillaceae
- Genus: Desulfatibacillum
- Species: D. alkenivorans

Binomial name
- Desulfatibacillum alkenivorans Cravo-Laureau et al. 2004

Type strain
- ATCC BAA-924, DSM 16219, PF2803

Species of bacterium

Desulfatibacillum alkenivorans is an alkene-degrading, sulfate-reducing, Gram-negative, non-spore-forming and non-motile bacterium from the genus Desulfatibacillum which has been isolated from oil polluted sediments in France.

== See also ==
- Desulfatibacillum alkenivorans AK-01
