= Desulfatibacillum alkenivorans AK-01 =

Scientific classification
- Domain: Bacteria
- Kingdom: Pseudomonadati
- Phylum: Thermodesulfobacteriota
- Class: Desulfobacteria
- Order: Desulfobacterales
- Family: Desulfatibacillaceae
- Genus: Desulfatibacillum
- Species: D. alkenivorans
- Strain: D. a. AK-01

Trionomial name
- Desulfatibacillum alkenivorans AK-01

Strain of bacteria

Desulfatibacillum alkenivorans AK-01 is a specific strain of Desulfatibacillum alkenivorans.

Strain AK-01 was isolated from the Arthur Kill, NJ/NY waterway. This site has a history of contamination from petrochemical industry. AK-01 is a delta-proteobacterium capable of using C13-C18 alkanes as growth substrates (So et al., 1999). Analysis of labeled and fully deuterated metabolites shows that AK-01 activates n-alkanes via fumarate addition to the subterminal carbon using alkylsuccinate synthase. Recent studies have also shown that AK-01 uses sulfate, sulfite and thiosulfate as terminal electron acceptors. It has also been shown that AK-01 uses not only alkanes but also 1-alkenes, 1-alkanols, fatty acids and other organic acids as carbon substrates.

== Background ==
The ubiquitous distribution of petroleum hydrocarbons in the environment is the consequence of diagenetic processes that occur in sedimentary rock formations containing large amounts of organic matter. Heat and pressure lead to the formation of a wide variety of hydrocarbons, including alkanes, alkenes, and cyclic/polycyclic aromatic hydrocarbons (PAHs), which can seep into aquatic environments. The environmental recalcitrance of many of these compounds is governed by their high bond dissociation energies. Alkanes are the least reactive class of hydrocarbons due to their apolar sigma bonds. In the absence of high temperatures, high pressures, metal catalysts or UV light, biotransformation plays the dominant role in environmental alkane degradation.

The mechanisms and genetics of aerobic hydrocarbon degradation have been described extensively. The key feature of aerobic degradation is the role of dioxygen. Oxygen is not only a physiological requirement, but serves as a reactant in the hydroxylation of both aliphatic and aromatic hydrocarbons via monooxygenase and dioxygenase enzymes. Oxygen's key role as a reactant during aerobic hydrocarbon degradation led to the belief for many years that n-alkanes and other hydrocarbons were recalcitrant under anoxic conditions. Research during the last 15 years, however, has shown that microorganisms have adapted and evolved to use hydrocarbon substrates under varying reducing conditions and that they employ novel biochemical processes to activate these compounds in the absence of oxygen. These processes have been observed in marine sediments, anaerobic sludge and contaminated aquifers.

The genome of Desulfatibacillum alkenivorans is currently being sequenced by the Joint Genome Institute. Sequencing is paid for by a Department of Energy grant to Boris Wawrik and Amy Callaghan at the University of Oklahoma.
