= Desulfobacterium autotrophicum =

Scientific classification
- Domain: Bacteria
- Kingdom: Pseudomonadati
- Phylum: Thermodesulfobacteriota
- Class: Desulfobacteria
- Order: Desulfobacterales
- Family: Desulfobacteriaceae
- Genus: Desulfobacterium
- Species: D. autotrophicum

Binomial name
- Desulfobacterium autotrophicum Brysch et al. 1988

Synonyms
- Desulforapulum autotrophicum (Brysch et al. 1988) Galushko & Kuever 2021

Species of bacterium

Desulfobacterium autotrophicum is a mesophilic sulfate-reducing bacterium. Its genome has been sequenced.
