= Desulfofrigus =

Scientific classification
- Domain: Bacteria
- Kingdom: Pseudomonadati
- Phylum: Thermodesulfobacteriota
- Class: Desulfobacteria
- Order: Desulfobacterales
- Family: Desulfobacteraceae
- Genus: Desulfofrigus; Knoblauch, Sahm & Jorgensen 1999

Type species
- Desulfofrigus oceanense Knoblauch, Sahm & Jorgensen 1999

Species
- D. fragile; D. oceanense

Genus of bacteria

Desulfofrigus is a Gram-negative, strictly anaerobic and non-spore-forming bacteria genus from the family Desulfobacteraceae.

== See also ==
- List of bacterial orders
- List of bacteria genera
