= Desulfosarcina =

Scientific classification
- Domain: Bacteria
- Kingdom: Pseudomonadati
- Phylum: Thermodesulfobacteriota
- Class: Desulfobacteria
- Order: Desulfobacterales
- Family: Desulfosarcinaceae
- Genus: Desulfosarcina; Widdel 1981

Type species
- Desulfosarcina variabilis Widdel 1981

Species
- D. alkanivorans; D. cetonica; D. ovata; D. variabilis; D. widdelii

Genus of bacteria

Desulfosarcina is a Gram-negative and strictly anaerobic bacteria genus from the family Desulfosarcinaceae.

== Phylogeny ==
The currently accepted taxonomy is based on the List of Prokaryotic names with Standing in Nomenclature (LPSN) and National Center for Biotechnology Information (NCBI).

16S rRNA based LTP_10_2024

- Desulfosarcina
  - D. alkanivorans Watanabe et al. 2017
  - - D. widdelii Watanabe et al. 2017
    - - D. ovata Kuever, Rainey & Widdel 2006
      - - D. cetonica corrig. (Galushko & Rozanova 1994) Kuever, Rainey & Widdel 2006
        - D. variabilis Widdel 1981

120 marker proteins based GTDB 10-RS226

- Desulfosarcina
  - - D. alkanivorans
    - D. widdelii
  - - D. cetonica
    - D. ovata
