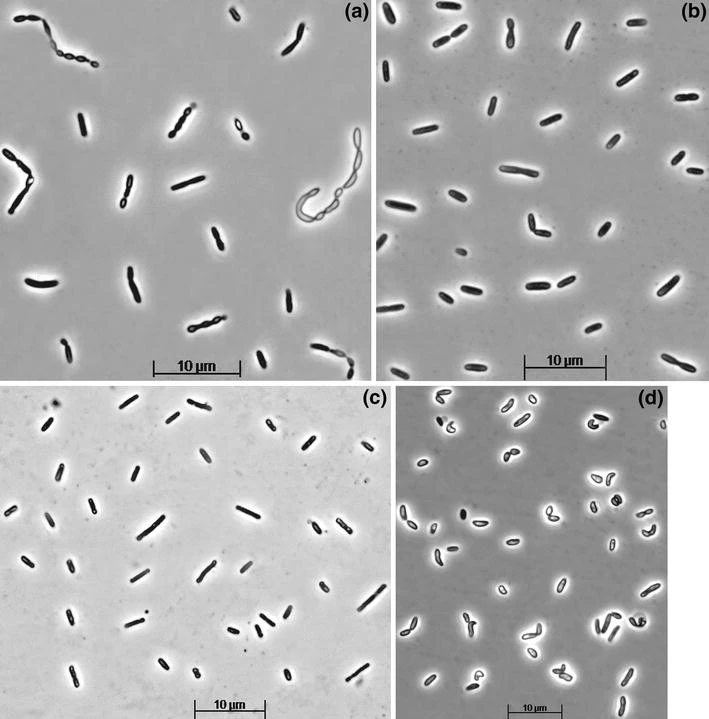
- Desulfonatronobacter acetoxydans

Scientific classification
- Domain: Bacteria
- Kingdom: Pseudomonadati
- Phylum: Thermodesulfobacteriota
- Class: Desulfobacteria
- Order: Desulfobacterales
- Family: Desulfosalsimonadaceae
- Genus: Desulfonatronobacter; Sorokin et al. 2012

Type species
- Desulfonatronobacter acidivorans Sorokin et al. 2012

Species
- D. acetoxydans; D. acidivorans

= Desulfonatronobacter =

Genus of bacteria

Desulfonatronobacter is a bacteria genus from the family Desulfosalsimonadaceae.

== Phylogeny ==
The currently accepted taxonomy is based on the List of Prokaryotic names with Standing in Nomenclature (LPSN) and National Center for Biotechnology Information (NCBI).

16S rRNA based LTP_10_2024

- Desulfosalsimonadaceae
  - Desulfonatronobacter acetoxydans Sorokin, Chernyh & Poroshina 2016
  - - Desulfonatronobacter acidivorans Sorokin et al. 2012
    - Desulfosalsimonas

== See also ==
- List of bacterial orders
- List of bacteria genera
