= Desulfoconvexum =

Scientific classification
- Domain: Bacteria
- Kingdom: Pseudomonadati
- Phylum: Thermodesulfobacteriota
- Class: Desulfobacteria
- Order: Desulfobacterales
- Family: Desulfobacteraceae
- Genus: Desulfoconvexum; Könneke et al. 2013

Type species
- Desulfoconvexum algidum Konneke et al. 2013

Species
- D. algidum

Genus of bacteria

Desulfoconvexum is a bacteria genus from the family of Desulfobacteraceae with one known species (Desulfoconvexum algidum).

== See also ==
- List of bacterial orders
- List of bacteria genera
