= Desulfatiferula =

Scientific classification
- Domain: Bacteria
- Kingdom: Pseudomonadati
- Phylum: Thermodesulfobacteriota
- Class: Desulfobacteria
- Order: Desulfobacterales
- Family: Desulfobacteraceae
- Genus: Desulfatiferula; Cravo-Laureau et al. 2007

Type species
- Desulfatiferula olefinivorans Cravo-Laureau et al. 2007

Species
- D. berrensis; D. olefinivorans

Synonyms
- Desulfatibacillus

Genus of bacteria

Desulfatiferula is a bacteria genus from the family of Desulfobacteraceae.

== See also ==
- List of bacterial orders
- List of bacteria genera
