= Desulfospira =

Scientific classification
- Domain: Bacteria
- Kingdom: Pseudomonadati
- Phylum: Thermodesulfobacteriota
- Class: Desulfobacteria
- Order: Desulfobacterales
- Family: Desulfobacteraceae
- Genus: Desulfospira; Finster, Liesack & Tindall 1997

Type species
- Desulfospira joergensenii Finster, Liesack & Tindall 1997

Species
- D. joergensenii

Genus of bacteria

Desulfospira is a Gram-negative and anaerobic bacteria genus from the family of Desulfobacteraceae.

== See also ==
- List of bacterial orders
- List of bacteria genera
