= Desulfatibacillum =

Scientific classification
- Domain: Bacteria
- Kingdom: Pseudomonadati
- Phylum: Thermodesulfobacteriota
- Class: Desulfobacteria
- Order: Desulfobacterales
- Family: Desulfatibacillaceae; Waite et al. 2020
- Genus: Desulfatibacillum; Cravo-Laureau et al. 2004

Type species
- Desulfatibacillum aliphaticivorans Cravo-Laureau et al. 2004

Species
- D. aliphaticivorans; D. alkenivorans

Synonyms
- "Desulfobacillum"

Genus of bacteria

Desulfatibacillum is a bacteria genus from the order Desulfobacterales.

== Phylogeny ==
The currently accepted taxonomy is based on the List of Prokaryotic names with Standing in Nomenclature (LPSN) and National Center for Biotechnology Information (NCBI).

16S rRNA based LTP_10_2024

- Desulfatibacillum
  - D. aliphaticivorans Cravo-Laureau et al. 2004
  - D. alkenivorans Cravo-Laureau et al. 2004

120 marker proteins based GTDB 10-RS226

- Desulfatibacillum
  - D. aliphaticivorans
  - D. alkenivorans

== See also ==
- Desulfatibacillum alkenivorans AK-01
- List of bacterial orders
- List of bacteria genera
