= Desulfatirhabdium =

Scientific classification
- Domain: Bacteria
- Kingdom: Pseudomonadati
- Phylum: Thermodesulfobacteriota
- Class: Desulfobacteria
- Order: Desulfobacterales
- Family: Desulfatirhabdiaceae; Waite et al. 2020
- Genus: Desulfatirhabdium; Balk et al. 2008

Type species
- Desulfatirhabdium butyrativorans Balk et al. 2008

Species
- Desulfatirhabdium butyrativorans

Genus of bacteria

Desulfatirhabdium is a bacteria genus from the order Desulfobacterales.
