= Desulfobacterium =

Scientific classification
- Domain: Bacteria
- Kingdom: Pseudomonadati
- Phylum: Thermodesulfobacteriota
- Class: Desulfobacteria
- Order: Desulfobacterales
- Family: Desulfobacteriaceae; Galushko and Kuever 2021
- Genus: Desulfobacterium; Bak and Widdel 1988

Type species
- Desulfobacterium indolicum Bak & Widdel 1988

Species
- D. autotrophicum; D. catecholicum; D. indolicum

Genus of bacteria

Desulfobacterium is a rod-shaped bacteria genus from the family Desulfobacteriaceae. Desulfobacterium occur widespread in brackish and marine sediments.

== See also ==
- List of bacterial orders
- List of bacteria genera
