= Hansenii =

Hansenii may refer to:

- Debaryomyces hansenii, species of yeast
- Delphinium hansenii, species of larkspur
- Desulfofaba hansenii, species of bacteria
- Komagataeibacter hansenii, species of bacteria
- Selaginella hansenii, species of spikemoss
- Synsphyronus hansenii, species of pseudoscorpion
