= Desulfocella =

Scientific classification
- Domain: Bacteria
- Kingdom: Pseudomonadati
- Phylum: Thermodesulfobacteriota
- Class: Desulfobacteria
- Order: Desulfobacterales
- Family: Desulfobacteraceae
- Genus: Desulfocella; Brandt, Patel & Ingvorsen 1999

Type species
- Desulfocella halophila Brandt, Patel & Ingvorsen 1999

Species
- D. halophila

Genus of bacteria

Desulfocella is a Gram-negative, anaerobic and non-spore-forming bacteria genus from the family Desulfobacteraceae with one known species (Desulfocella halophila).
