= Desulfobotulus =

Scientific classification
- Domain: Bacteria
- Kingdom: Pseudomonadati
- Phylum: Thermodesulfobacteriota
- Class: Desulfobacteria
- Order: Desulfobacterales
- Family: Desulfobacteraceae
- Genus: Desulfobotulus; Kuever et al. 2009

Type species
- Desulfobotulus sapovorans (Widdel 1981) Kuever, Rainey & Widdel 2009

Species
- D. alkaliphilus; D. mexicanus; D. pelophilus; D. sapovorans

Genus of bacteria

Desulfobotulus is a Gram-negative, anaerobic, non-spore-forming and motile bacteria genus from the family of Desulfobacteraceae.

== Phylogeny ==
The currently accepted taxonomy is based on the List of Prokaryotic names with Standing in Nomenclature (LPSN) and National Center for Biotechnology Information (NCBI).

16S rRNA based LTP_10_2024

- Desulfobotulus
  - D. sapovorans (Widdel 1981) Kuever, Rainey & Widdel 2009
  - - D. alkaliphilus Sorokin et al. 2010
    - - D. mexicanus Pérez-Bernal et al. 2020
      - D. pelophilus Frolova et al. 2024

120 marker proteins based GTDB 10-RS226

- Desulfobotulus
  - D. pelophilus
  - - D. alkaliphilus
    - D. mexicanus

== See also ==
- List of bacterial orders
- List of bacteria genera
