= Desulfatitalea =

Scientific classification
- Domain: Bacteria
- Kingdom: Pseudomonadati
- Phylum: Thermodesulfobacteriota
- Class: Desulfobacteria
- Order: Desulfobacterales
- Family: Desulfosarcinaceae
- Genus: Desulfatitalea; Higashioka et al. 2013

Type species
- Desulfatitalea tepidiphila Higashioka et al. 2013

Species
- D. alkaliphila; D. tepidiphila

Genus of bacteria

Desulfatitalea is a bacteria genus from the family Desulfosarcinaceae.

== Phylogeny ==
The currently accepted taxonomy is based on the List of Prokaryotic names with Standing in Nomenclature (LPSN) and National Center for Biotechnology Information (NCBI).

16S rRNA based LTP_10_2024

- Desulfatitalea
  D. tepidiphila

120 marker proteins based GTDB 10-RS226

- Desulfatitalea
  - D. alkaliphila Khomyakova et al. 2024
  - D. tepidiphila Higashioka et al. 2013
