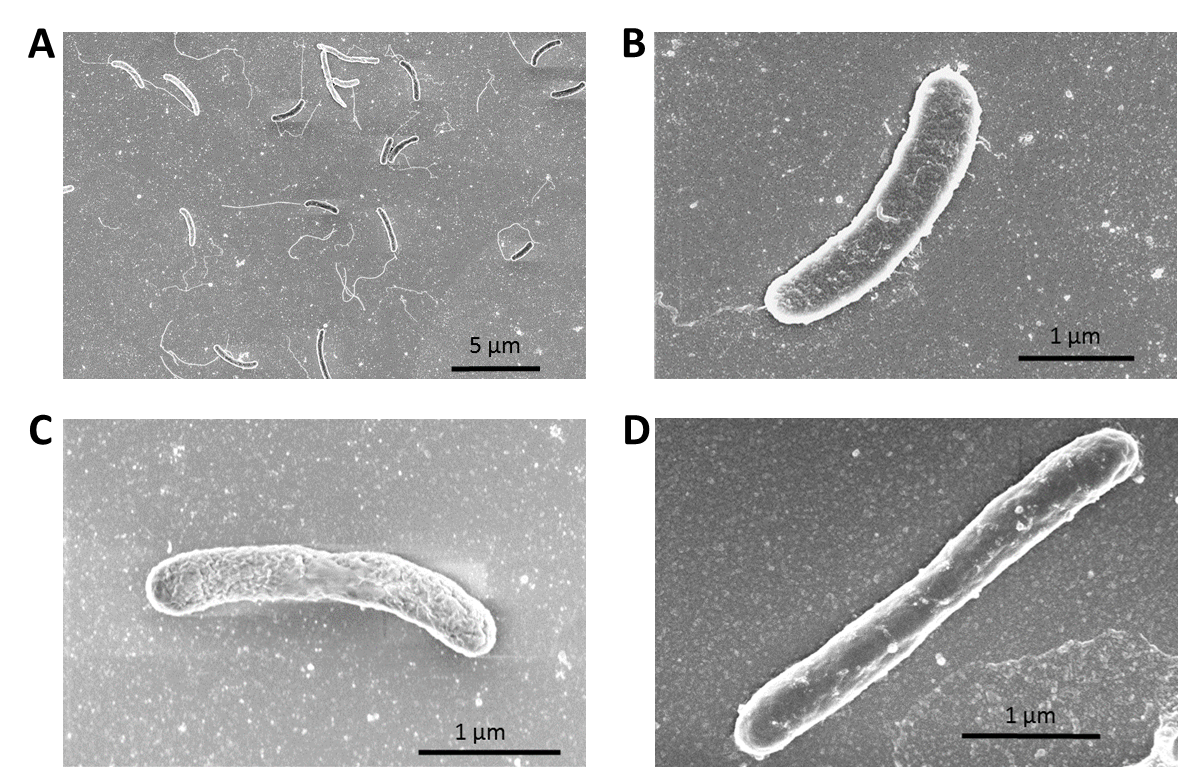
- Scanning electron microscope images of Desulfoluna spongiiphila strain DBB (A and B), D. spongiiphila AA1T (C) and D. butyratoxydans MSL71T (D)

Scientific classification
- Domain: Bacteria
- Kingdom: Pseudomonadati
- Phylum: Thermodesulfobacteriota
- Class: Desulfobacteria
- Order: Desulfobacterales
- Family: Desulfolunaceae
- Genus: Desulfoluna; Suzuki et al. 2008

Type species
- Desulfoluna butyratoxydans Suzuki et al. 2008

Species
- D. butyratoxydans; "D. limicola"; D. spongiiphila

= Desulfoluna =

Genus of bacteria

Desulfoluna is a bacteria genus from the order Desulfobacterales.

== Phylogeny ==
The currently accepted taxonomy is based on the List of Prokaryotic names with Standing in Nomenclature (LPSN) and National Center for Biotechnology Information (NCBI).

16S rRNA based LTP_10_2024

- Desulfoluna
  - D. butyratoxydans
  - D. spongiiphila

120 marker proteins based GTDB 10-RS226

- Desulfoluna
  - "D. limicola" Watanabe et al. 2022
  - - D. butyratoxydans Suzuki et al. 2008
    - D. spongiiphila Ahn, Kerkhof & Häggblom 2009

== See also ==
- List of bacterial orders
- List of bacteria genera
