= Desulfosalsimonas =

Scientific classification
- Domain: Bacteria
- Kingdom: Pseudomonadati
- Phylum: Thermodesulfobacteriota
- Class: Desulfobacteria
- Order: Desulfobacterales
- Family: Desulfosalsimonadaceae
- Genus: Desulfosalsimonas; Kjeldsen et al. 2010

Type species
- Desulfosalsimonas propionicica Kjeldsen et al. 2010

Species
- D. propionicica

Synonyms
- "Desulfosalina"

Genus of bacteria

Desulfosalsimonas is a bacteria genus from the family Desulfosalsimonadaceae.

== See also ==
- List of bacterial orders
- List of bacteria genera
