= Desulforegula =

Scientific classification
- Domain: Bacteria
- Kingdom: Pseudomonadati
- Phylum: Thermodesulfobacteriota
- Class: Desulfobacteria
- Order: Desulfobacterales
- Family: Desulforegulaceae; Waite et al. 2020
- Genus: Desulforegula; Rees & Patel 2001
- Species: D. conservatrix

Binomial name
- Desulforegula conservatrix Rees & Patel 2001

Genus of bacteria

Desulforegula is a bacteria genus from the order Desulfobacterales. The only species is Desulforegula conservatrix.
