= Desulfosudis =

Scientific classification
- Domain: Bacteria
- Kingdom: Pseudomonadati
- Phylum: Thermodesulfobacteriota
- Class: Desulfobacteria
- Order: Desulfobacterales
- Family: Desulfosudaceae; Galushko and Kuever 2021
- Genus: Desulfosudis; Galushko and Kuever 2021
- Species: D. oleivorans

Binomial name
- Desulfosudis oleivorans Galushko and Kuever 2021

Type strain
- DSM 6200, Hxd3

Synonyms
- "Desulfobacterium oleovorans" Aeckersberg, Bak & Widdel 1991; "Desulfococcus oleovorans" (Aeckersberg et al. 1991)

Species of bacterium

Desulfosudis oleivorans is a bacterium from the genus Desulfosudis which has been isolated from mud from an oilfield near Hamburg in Germany. It is the only species in the genus Desulfosudis and family Desulfosudaceae.

== Strain Hxd3 ==
Desulfosudis oleivorans strain Hxd3 was isolated from the saline water phase of an oil-water separator from a northern German oil field. Hxd3 is a delta-proteobacterium capable of utilizing C12-C20 alkanes as growth substrates. Hxd3 activates alkanes via carboxylation at C3, with subsequent elimination of the terminal and subterminal carbons, yielding a fatty acid that is one carbon shorter than the parent alkane. Hxd3 is the only pure culture that is known to carboxylate aliphatic hydrocarbons.

The genome of Desulfosudis oleivorans has been completely sequenced by the Joint Genome Institute. Sequencing is paid for by a Department of Energy grant to Boris Wawrik et al. at Rutgers University.
