= Desulfococcaceae =

Scientific classification
- Domain: Bacteria
- Kingdom: Pseudomonadati
- Phylum: Thermodesulfobacteriota
- Class: Desulfobacteria
- Order: Desulfobacterales
- Family: Desulfococcaceae; Waite et al. 2020

Genera
- Desulfococcus; Desulfonema

Family of bacteria

The Desulfococcaceae are a family in the order Desulfobacterales.

== Phylogeny ==
The currently accepted taxonomy is based on the List of Prokaryotic names with Standing in Nomenclature (LPSN) and National Center for Biotechnology Information (NCBI).

16S rRNA based LTP_10_2024

- Desulfococcaceae
  - Desulfonema ishimotonii
  - - Desulfonema magna
    - - Desulfonema limicola
      - Desulfococcus

120 marker proteins based GTDB 10-RS226

- - 4be13
    Desulfonema magna Widdel 1981
  - Desulfococcaceae
    - Desulfonema limicola Widdel 1981 (type sp.)
    - - Desulfonema ishimotonii corrig. Fukui et al. 2000
      - Desulfococcus Widdel 1981

== See also ==
- List of bacterial orders
- List of bacteria genera
