= Desulfosarcinaceae =

Scientific classification
- Domain: Bacteria
- Kingdom: Pseudomonadati
- Phylum: Thermodesulfobacteriota
- Class: Desulfobacteria
- Order: Desulfobacterales
- Family: Desulfosarcinaceae; Waite et al. 2020

Genera
- Desulfatitalea; Desulfosarcina

Family of bacteria

The Desulfosarcinaceae are a family in the order Desulfobacterales.

== Phylogeny ==
The currently accepted taxonomy is based on the List of Prokaryotic names with Standing in Nomenclature (LPSN) and National Center for Biotechnology Information (NCBI).

16S rRNA based LTP_10_2024

- Desulfosarcinaceae part
  Desulfatitalea

- Desulfosarcinaceae
  Desulfosarcina

120 marker proteins based GTDB 10-RS226

- Desulfosarcinaceae
  - Desulfatitalea Higashioka et al. 2013
  - Desulfosarcina Widdel 1981

== See also ==
- List of bacterial orders
- List of bacteria genera
