= Desulfobacteraceae =

Scientific classification
- Domain: Bacteria
- Kingdom: Pseudomonadati
- Phylum: Thermodesulfobacteriota
- Class: Desulfobacteria
- Order: Desulfobacterales
- Family: Desulfobacteraceae; Kuever, Rainey & Widdel 2006

Genera
- "Algorimarina"; Desulfobacter; Desulfobacula; Desulfobotulus; Desulfocella; Desulfocicer; Desulfoconvexum; Desulfofaba; Desulforapulum; Desulfospira; Desulfotignum

Family of bacteria

The Desulfobacteraceae are a family of Thermodesulfobacteriota. They reduce sulfates to sulfides to obtain energy and are strictly anaerobic. They have a respiratory and fermentative type of metabolism. Some species are chemolithotrophic and use inorganic materials to obtain energy and use hydrogen as their electron donor.

== Biology and biochemistry ==
=== Morphology ===
Desulfobacteraceae vary widely in shape and size across the family.

Genera and species of Desulfobacteraceae may only be definitively distinguished by analysis of 16S rDNA sequences, but certain genera may be determined through physiological characteristics alone. Desulfofrigus displays an optimal growth rate at very low temperatures compared to other sulfate reducing bacteria. It is also unable to grow in the presence of propionate.

=== Metabolism ===
Most species of Desulfobacteraceae use sulfur compounds as their main energy source. The most common source used is sulfate which, through metabolic processes, is reduced to sulfide. In an environment with little or no sulfate, sulfite or elemental sulfur may also be used and reduced into sulfide. In rare cases nitrate may also be used as a food source and reduced into ammonia. They have very efficient sulfate reduction rates (between 12 and 423 mu mol/dm^{3} day^{−1}) in optimal conditions.

== Habitat ==
Desulfobacteraceae may be found in a range of locations but are most often found in saline and hypersaline waters including salt lakes and the ocean. They have also been found in polar ice in Antarctica. They may be found trapped within ice, floating within the water column, or living on or in other organisms such as sea sponges.

== Phylogeny ==
The currently accepted taxonomy is based on the List of Prokaryotic names with Standing in Nomenclature (LPSN) and National Center for Biotechnology Information (NCBI).

16S rRNA based LTP_08_2023

- - Desulfocella Brandt, Patel & Ingvorsen 1999
  - - - - Desulfofabaceae
          Desulfofaba Knoblauch, Sahm & Jorgensen 1999
      - - - Desulfosalsimonadaceae
            - Desulfonatronobacter Sorokin et al. 2012
            - Desulfosalsimonas Kjeldsen et al. 2010
        - other
    - - - Desulfolunaceae
          - Desulfatiferula Cravo-Laureau et al. 2007
          - - Desulfofrigus Knoblauch, Sahm & Jorgensen 1999
            - Desulfoluna Suzuki et al. 2008
      - - Desulforegulaceae
          Desulforegula Rees & Patel 2001
        - Desulfobacteraceae
          - Desulfobotulus Kuever, Rainey & Widdel 2009
          - - - Desulforapulum Galushko & Kuever 2021
              - Desulfocicer Galushko & Kuever 2021
            - - Desulfospira Finster, Liesack & Tindall 1997
              - - - Desulfoconvexum Konneke et al. 2013
                  - Desulfobacula Rabus et al. 2000
                - - Desulfotignum Kuever et al. 2001
                  - Desulfobacter Widdel 1981

120 marker proteins based GTDB 10-RS226

- - - Desulfosudaceae
      Desulfosudis
    - Desulfosalsimonadaceae
      Desulfosalsimonas Kjeldsen et al. 2010
  - - - Desulforegulaceae
        Desulforegula
      - ASO4‑4
        Desulfobotulus
    - - Desulfolunaceae
        Desulfoluna
      - Desulfobacteraceae
        - - Desulforapulum
          - - "Desulfamplus" Descamps et al. 2017
            - Desulfocicer
        - - Desulfobacula
          - - - Desulfospira
              - Desulfotignum
            - Desulfobacter

== See also ==
- Cable bacteria
- List of bacterial orders
- List of bacteria genera
