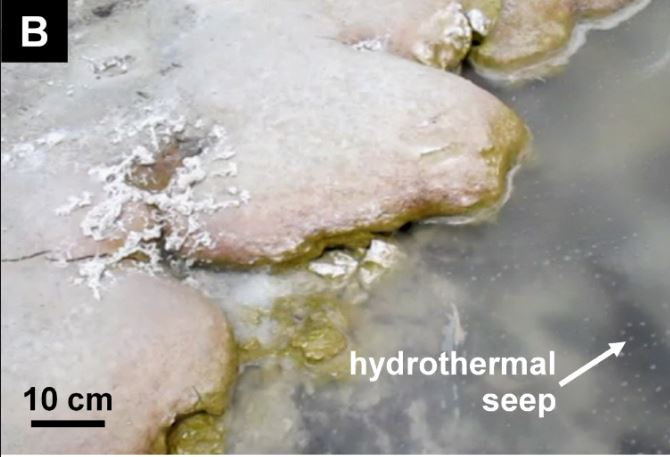
- Stromatolites next to a volcanic lake, found to harbor abundant Desulfobacterales

Scientific classification
- Domain: Bacteria
- Kingdom: Pseudomonadati
- Phylum: Thermodesulfobacteriota
- Class: Desulfobacteria
- Order: Desulfobacterales; Kuever, Rainey & Widdel 2006

Families
- Ca. Magnetomoraceae; Desulfatibacillaceae; Desulfatirhabdiaceae; Desulfoarculaceae; Desulfobacteraceae; Desulfobacteriaceae; Desulfococcaceae; Desulfofabaceae; Desulfolunaceae; Desulforegulaceae; Desulfosalsimonadaceae; Desulfosarcinaceae; Desulfosudaceae

= Desulfobacterales =

Order of bacteria

Desulfobacterales are an order of sulfate-reducing bacteria within the phylum Thermodesulfobacteria. The bacteria in this order are strict anaerobic respirators, using sulfate or nitrate as the terminal electron acceptor instead of oxygen. Desulfobacterales can degrade ethanol, molecular hydrogen, organic acids, and small hydrocarbons. They have a wide ecological range and play important environmental roles in symbiotic relationships and nutrient cycling.

== Habitat ==
Desulfobacterales are found globally and often in extreme environments, such as deep-sea hydrothermal vents, hot springs, marine sediment, and solfataric fields, an area of volcanic venting that gives off sulfurous gases.

== Symbiotic relationships ==
Sulfate-reduction by Desulfobacteraceae and Desulfobulbaceae in coastal marine sediments plays an important role in molecular hydrogen cycling through a close relationship with fermenting microorganisms. Fermenting microbes break down organic materials on the seafloor and produce molecular oxygen and organic acids. Molecular hydrogen is an essential electron donor used by Desulfobacterales; they use the molecular hydrogen produced by fermentation to drive sulfate reduction. This feedback loop maintains molecular hydrogen at an energetically favorable level for fermenting respiration and provides ample molecular hydrogen for sulfate reduction.

== Nitrogen cycling ==
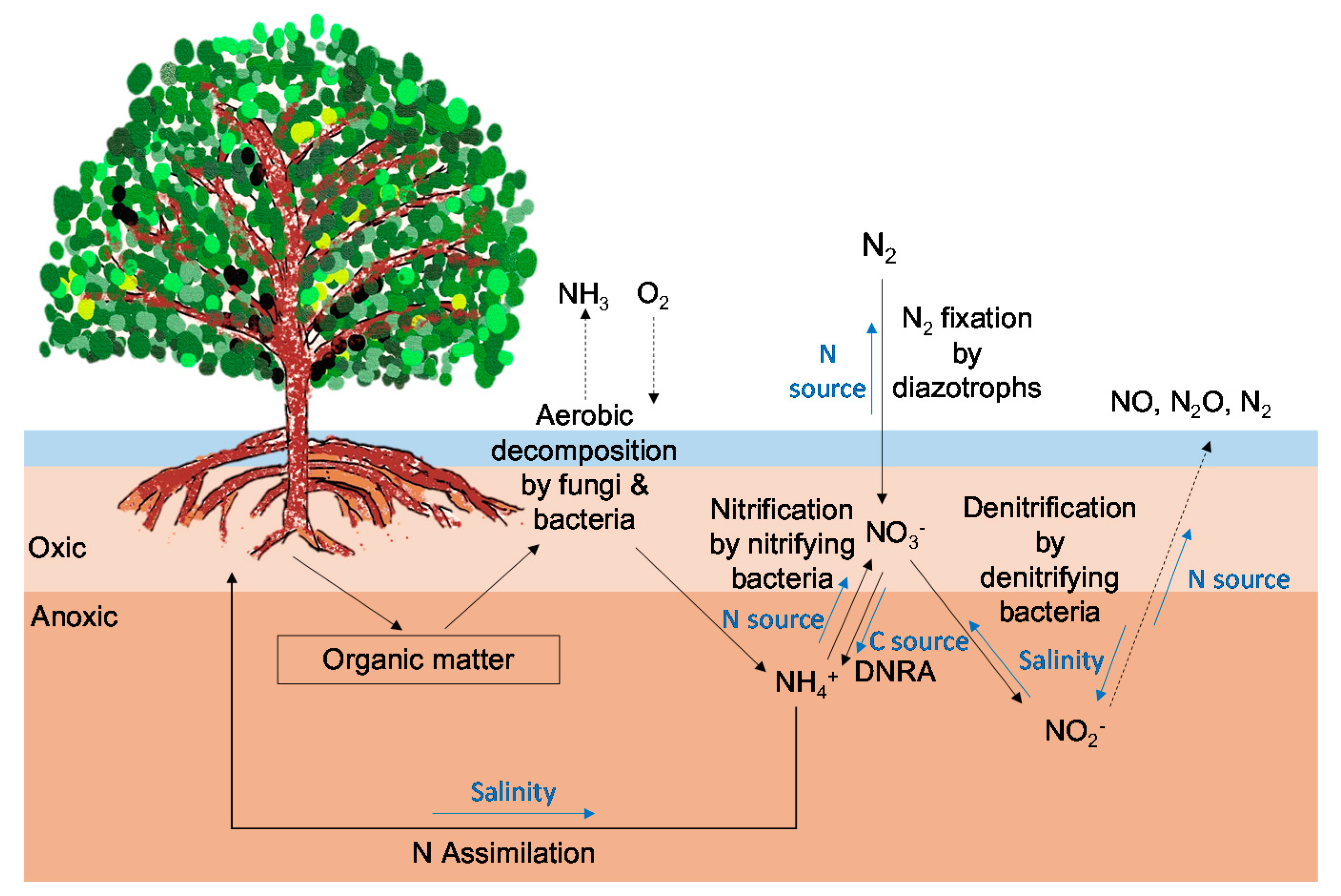
Nitrogen cycle pathways in mangrove ecosystems.

Human activity, such as increased fertilizer use, has caused nitrogen pollution in inland and coastal waters. An influx of nitrogen inputs into aquatic ecosystems can cause negative effects such as eutrophication, resulting in anoxic conditions. Desulfobacterales are important in nitrogen pollution mitigation in coastal mangrove ecosystems through nitrate reduction. Nitrate is reduced by Desulfobacterales species via dissimilatory nitrate reduction genes. Dissimilatory nitrate reduction accounts for roughly 75.7–85.9% of nitrate reduction in mangrove ecosystems. Dissimilatory nitrate reduction is important because nitrate is reduced to ammonium, which can then be taken up by other microorganisms and plants in the system.

== Phylogeny ==
The currently accepted taxonomy is based on the List of Prokaryotic names with Standing in Nomenclature (LPSN) and National Center for Biotechnology Information (NCBI).

16S rRNA based LTP_10_2024

- - Desulfocella Brandt, Patel & Ingvorsen 1999
  - - - Desulfofabaceae Galushko & Kuever 2021
      - - - Desulfosalsimonadaceae
          - Desulfosarcinaceae
        - - - - Desulfatirhabdiaceae
              - Desulfosudaceae
            - - Desulfobacteriaceae Galushko & Kuever 2021
              - Desulfatibacillaceae
          - - Desulfatitalea Higashioka et al. 2013
            - Desulfococcaceae
    - - Desulfolunaceae
      - - Desulforegulaceae
        - Desulfobacteraceae

120 marker proteins based GTDB 10-RS226

- - - Desulfatibacillaceae Waite et al. 2020
    - "Magnetomoraceae" Waite et al. 2020
  - - "Ca. Desulfarcum" Monteil et al. 2019 {CR-1}
    - - - Desulfatirhabdiaceae Waite et al. 2020
        - - - - Desulfonema magna {4be13}
              - Desulfococcaceae Waite et al. 2020
            - - "Desulfaltiaceae" Pallen, Rodriguez-R & Alikhan 2022
              - "Desulfatibiaceae" Pallen, Rodriguez-R & Alikhan 2022
          - Desulfosarcinaceae Waite et al. 2020
      - - - Desulfosudaceae Galushko & Kuever 2021
          - Desulfosalsimonadaceae Galushko & Kuever 2021
        - - - Desulforegulaceae Waite et al. 2020
            - Desulfobotulus Kuever, Rainey & Widdel 2009 {ASO4-4}
          - - Desulfolunaceae Waite et al. 2020
            - Desulfobacteraceae Kuever, Rainey & Widdel 2006

== See also ==
- List of bacterial orders
- List of bacteria genera
