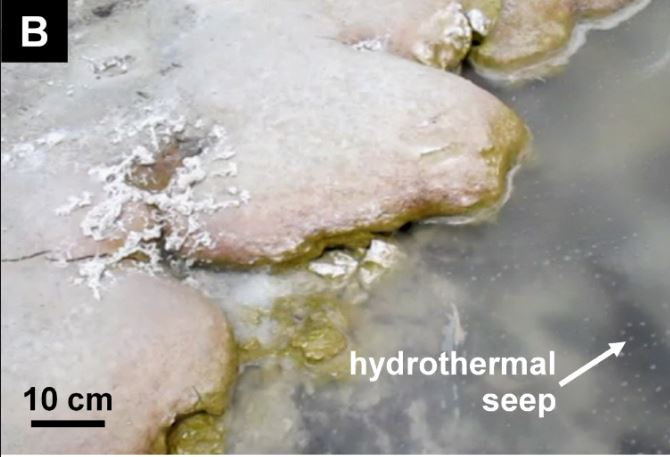
- Stromatolites next to a volcanic lake, found to harbor abundant Desulfobacterales

Scientific classification
- Domain: Bacteria
- Kingdom: Pseudomonadati
- Phylum: Thermodesulfobacteriota
- Class: Desulfobacteria; Waite et al. 2020

Orders
- Desulfobacterales

= Desulfobacteria =

Class of bacteria

The Desulfobacteria are a class of bacteria in the phylum Thermodesulfobacteriota. They are strictly anaerobic respirators, using sulfate or nitrate as the terminal electron acceptors.
