= Brevitalea aridisoli =

Scientific classification
- Domain: Bacteria
- Kingdom: Pseudomonadati
- Phylum: Acidobacteriota
- Class: Blastocatellia
- Order: Blastocatellales
- Family: Arenimicrobiaceae
- Genus: Brevitalea
- Species: B. aridisoli

Binomial name
- Brevitalea aridisoli Wust et al. 2016

Type strain
- DSM 27934, LMG 28618, strain Ac_11_E3

Species of bacterium

Brevitalea aridisoli is a bacterium from the genus of Brevitalea which has been isolated from savanna soil from Mashare in Namibia.
