= Aridibacter famidurans =

Scientific classification
- Domain: Bacteria
- Kingdom: Pseudomonadati
- Phylum: Acidobacteriota
- Class: Blastocatellia
- Order: Blastocatellales
- Family: Blastocatellaceae
- Genus: Aridibacter
- Species: A. famidurans

Binomial name
- Aridibacter famidurans Huber et al. 2014

Type strain
- A22_HD_4H, DSM 26555, LMG 27985

Species of bacterium

Aridibacter famidurans is a non-motile bacterium from the genus of Aridibacter which has been isolated from clayey sand from Erichsfelde in Namibia.
