= Aridibacter nitratireducens =

Scientific classification
- Domain: Bacteria
- Kingdom: Pseudomonadati
- Phylum: Acidobacteriota
- Class: Blastocatellia
- Order: Blastocatellales
- Family: Blastocatellaceae
- Genus: Aridibacter
- Species: A. nitratireducens

Binomial name
- Aridibacter nitratireducens Huber et al. 2017

Type strain
- A_24_SHP_-5_238, CECT 9235, DSM 102177

Species of bacterium

Aridibacter nitratireducens is a non-motile bacterium from the genus of Aridibacter which has been isolated from clayey sand from Eikwe in Ghana.
