= Aridibacter =

Scientific classification
- Domain: Bacteria
- Kingdom: Pseudomonadati
- Phylum: Acidobacteriota
- Class: Blastocatellia
- Order: Blastocatellales
- Family: Blastocatellaceae
- Genus: Aridibacter; Huber et al. 2014

Type species
- Aridibacter famidurans Huber et al. 2014

Species
- A. famidurans; A. kavangonensis; A. nitratireducens

Genus of bacteria

Alkalitalea is a genus of bacteria from the family of Blastocatellaceae.

== Phylogeny ==
The currently accepted taxonomy is based on the List of Prokaryotic names with Standing in Nomenclature (LSPN) and National Center for Biotechnology Information (NCBI).

16S rRNA based LTP_10_2024

- Aridibacter
  - A. nitratireducens Huber et al. 2017
  - - A. famidurans Huber et al. 2014
    - A. kavangonensis Huber et al. 2014

120 marker proteins based GTDB 10-RS226

- Aridibacter
  - A. famidurans

== See also ==
- List of bacterial orders
- List of bacteria genera
