= Blastocatella =

Scientific classification
- Domain: Bacteria
- Kingdom: Pseudomonadati
- Phylum: Acidobacteriota
- Class: Blastocatellia
- Order: Blastocatellales
- Family: Blastocatellaceae
- Genus: Blastocatella; Foesel, Rohde & Overmann 2013

Type species
- Blastocatella fastidiosa Foesel, Rohde & Overmann 2013

Species
- B. fastidiosa

Genus of bacteria

Blastocatella is a genus of bacteria from the family of Blastocatellaceae with one known species (Blastocatella fastidiosa). Blastocatella fastidiosa has been isolated from savanna soil from Erichsfelde in Namibia.

== See also ==
- List of bacterial orders
- List of bacteria genera
