= Blastocatellaceae =

Scientific classification
- Domain: Bacteria
- Kingdom: Pseudomonadati
- Phylum: Acidobacteriota
- Class: Blastocatellia
- Order: Blastocatellales
- Family: Blastocatellaceae; Pascual et al. 2016

Genera
- Aridibacter; Blastocatella; Stenotrophobacter; Tellurimicrobium

Family of bacteria

The Blastocatellaceae is a family of bacteria.

== Phylogeny ==
The currently accepted taxonomy is based on the List of Prokaryotic names with Standing in Nomenclature (LPSN) and National Center for Biotechnology Information (NCBI).

16S rRNA sequences.

- Blastocatellaceae
  - Blastocatella
  - - Aridibacter
    - - Tellurimicrobium
      - Stenotrophobacter

16S rRNA based LTP_10_2024

- - - Pyrinomonadaceae
      Pyrinomonas Crowe et al. 2014
  - - Arenimicrobiaceae
      - Arenimicrobium Wüst et al. 2016
      - Brevitalea Wüst et al. 2016
    - Blastocatellaceae
      - Blastocatella Foesel, Rohde & Overmann 2013
      - - Aridibacter Huber et al. 2014
        - - Tellurimicrobium Pascual et al. 2016
          - Stenotrophobacter Pascual et al. 2016

120 marker proteins based GTDB 10-RS226

- Pyrinomonadaceae
  - Pyrinomonas
  - Aridibacter

== See also ==
- List of bacterial orders
- List of bacteria genera
