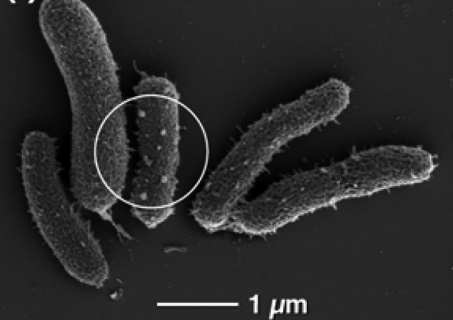
- Brevitalea deliciosa

Scientific classification
- Domain: Bacteria
- Kingdom: Pseudomonadati
- Phylum: Acidobacteriota
- Class: Blastocatellia
- Order: Blastocatellales
- Family: Arenimicrobiaceae
- Genus: Brevitalea; Wüst et al. 2016

Type species
- Brevitalea aridisoli Wüst et al. 2016

Species
- B. aridisoli; B. deliciosa

= Brevitalea =

Genus of bacteria

Brevitalea is a genus of bacteria from the family of Arenimicrobiaceae.

== See also ==
- List of bacterial orders
- List of bacteria genera
