= Chloracidobacterium =

Scientific classification
- Domain: Bacteria
- Kingdom: Pseudomonadati
- Phylum: Acidobacteriota
- Class: "Acidobacteriia"
- Order: Acidobacteriales
- Family: Acidobacteriaceae
- Genus: "Chloracidobacterium"; Tank and Bryant 2015

Type species
- "Chloracidobacterium thermophilum" Tank and Bryant 2015

Species
- "C. aggregatum"; "C. thermophilum"; "C. validum"

Synonyms
- "Ca. Chloracidobacterium" Bryant et al. 2007

Genus of bacteria

Chloracidobacterium is a genus of the Acidobacteriota. It is currently assigned to the family Acidobacteriaceae, but phylogenetic evidence suggests that it belongs in Blastocatellia.

This is a group of photosynthetic bacteria were discovered in 2007 and their identification extends the number of bacterial phyla that can carry out chlorophyll-based photosynthesis from five to six.

== "Candidatus Chloracidobacterium thermophilum" ==
The organism "Candidatus Chloracidobacterium thermophilum" was initially detected through the bioinformatics analyses of metagenomic sequence data from the microbial mats collected from a hot spring in Yellowstone National Park. It was later isolated after the inhibition of Synechococcus species in the microbial mats samples, leading to a co-culture C. thermophilum, Anoxybacillus species, and Meiothermus species. C. thermophilum was plated on Midnight Medium (CTM) media to culture it for pure isolation. Genomic sequencing of the bacterium revealed that it did not contain genes for the enzymes to reduce sulfate, yet it was dependent on a reduced sulfur source. The researchers likely speculated that it shared a mutualistic relationship with the cocultures of Meiothermus species and Anoxybacillus species for access to reduced sulfur sources. In addition, the bacterium was determined to be aerophilic, moderately thermophilic, anoxygenic and photoheterotrophic. Ultimately, they found that it is dependent on a reduced sulfur source, bicarbonate, L-lysine, and vitamin B_{12} for pre culture isolation.

== Phylogeny ==
The currently accepted taxonomy is based on the List of Prokaryotic names with Standing in Nomenclature (LPSN) and National Center for Biotechnology Information (NCBI).

16S rRNA based LTP_01_2022 and Dedysh & Yilmaz 2018

- Blastocatellia
  - Order 24
  - - - Blastocatellales
      - Order 14-2
    - Chloracidobacterium thermophilum {"Chloracidobacteriales": "Chloracidobacteriaceae"}

120 marker proteins based GTDB 10-RS226

- "Chloracidobacterium"
  - "C. validum" Saini et al. 2021
  - - "C. aggregatum" Saini et al. 2021
    - "C. thermophilum" Tank & Bryant 2015

== See also ==
- List of bacterial orders
- List of bacteria genera
