= Pyrinomonas =

Scientific classification
- Domain: Bacteria
- Kingdom: Pseudomonadati
- Phylum: Acidobacteriota
- Class: Blastocatellia
- Order: Blastocatellales
- Family: Pyrinomonadaceae
- Genus: Pyrinomonas; Crowe et al. 2014

Type species
- Pyrinomonas methylaliphatogenes Crowe et al. 2014

Species
- P. methylaliphatogenes

Species of bacteria

Pyrinomonas is a genus of bacteria, containing the only species Pyrinomonas methylaliphatogenes, which is an aerobic, thermophilic, and acidophilic strain of bacteria that can scavenge hydrogen gas from the atmosphere to survive in nutrient-deficient areas.

== See also ==
- List of bacterial orders
- List of bacteria genera
