= Arenimicrobiaceae =

Scientific classification
- Domain: Bacteria
- Kingdom: Pseudomonadati
- Phylum: Acidobacteriota
- Class: Blastocatellia
- Order: Blastocatellales
- Family: Arenimicrobiaceae; Dedysh and Yilmaz 2018

Genera
- Arenimicrobium Wüst et al. 2016; Brevitalea Wüst et al. 2016

Family of bacteria

Arenimicrobiaceae is a family of bacteria.

== See also ==
- List of bacterial orders
- List of bacteria genera
