= Blastocatellales =

Scientific classification
- Domain: Bacteria
- Kingdom: Pseudomonadati
- Phylum: Acidobacteriota
- Class: Blastocatellia; Pascual et al. 2016
- Order: Blastocatellales; Pascual et al. 2016

Families
- Arenimicrobiaceae; Blastocatellaceae; Pyrinomonadaceae

Synonyms
- Pyrinomonadales Chuvochina et al. 2024

Order of bacteria

The Blastocatellales is an order of Acidobacteriota within the class Blastocatellia.

== Phylogeny ==
The currently accepted taxonomy is based on the List of Prokaryotic names with Standing in Nomenclature and National Center for Biotechnology Information (NCBI).

16S rRNA sequences

- - Order 24
  - - - "Chloracidobacteriales"
        "Chloracidobacteriaceae"
    - - Order 14-2
      - - Blastocatellales
          - Order 14-1
          - - Pyrinomonadaceae
            - - Family 3-4
              - - Family 3-3
                - - Family 3-2
                  - - Arenimicrobiaceae
                    - - Family 3-6
                      - Blastocatellaceae

16S rRNA based LTP_10_2024

- - "Chloracidobacteriales"
    "Chloracidobacteriaceae" Saini et al. 2021
  - Blastocatellales
    - Pyrinomonadaceae Wüst et al. 2016
    - - Arenimicrobiaceae Dedysh and Yilmaz 2018
      - Blastocatellaceae Pascual et al. 2016

120 marker proteins based GTDB 10-RS226

- - "Chloracidobacteriales"
    "Chloracidobacteriaceae"
  - Pyrinomonadales
    Pyrinomonadaceae
