= List of unusual biological names =

This is a list of unusual biological names, given to biological inventions and discoveries. One might consider the listed names unusual due to their containing pop culture references or puns.

== Genes and proteins ==
In the early days of genomics, genes were often given creative names upon discovery. A nomenclature committee later established naming guidelines, but several early names remain.

Name	Explanation
Bag-of-marbles	Has role in regulating gamete differentiation and division of precursor cells; a null mutation may cause the gonads to appear as "Bags of marbles"
Buttonhead	Mutations in this gene causes head development to fail
Cheap date	Mutations in this gene cause marked susceptibility to alcohol intoxication
Deadpan	An essential pan-neural gene
DIABLO	Direct IAP binding protein, low
Dreadlocks	Mutations in this gene cause cell projections to clump together like dreadlocks
Dunce	A memory-related gene associated with Rutabaga
ELMO	Engulfment and Cell Motility, contains the family ELMO1, ELMO2, and ELMO3
Exuperantia	Named after St. Exuperantia, this gene is associated with dividing the head and body into regions
Fizzy-related	
Flippase and floppase	Protein that "flips" and "flops" phosphatidylserines on the cell membrane from the inner side and the outer side, respectively
Hedgehog signaling pathway, and the associated genes: Sonic hedgehog (and formerly associated with tiggywinkle hedgehog); Desert hedgehog; Indian hedgehog; Smoothened; Frizzled; Dishevelled; Patched	Named for the video game character Sonic the Hedgehog, these are critical genes involved in development and tumorigenesis
Headcase	
Hunchback	Mutations in hunchback cause disruptions in body shape in model organisms, such as a "hunchback"
Indy	Short for I'm not dead yet, mutations in this gene extend the lifespan of D. melanogaster
Ken and Barbie	Mutations in the ken and barbie locus of this drosophila gene cause loss of external male and female genitalia in a fraction of homozygous flies
Lunatic Fringe, Manic Fringe, and Radical Fringe	
Makes caterpillars floppy	Gene in Photorhabdus luminescens, codes for a toxin which leads to insects’ bodies breaking down
MAP kinase kinase kinase and MAP kinase kinase kinase kinase	
MinosPhrime	Bacteriophage named after Minos Prime from the video game ULTRAKILL.
Mothers against decapentaplegic 1–9, and the associated Daughters against dpp	Takes the name from "Mothers against drunk driving" and similar campaigns, mutations in the gene of the mother cause improper development in the mother's offspring
Moron gene	A prophage gene that has no role in the phage's lysogenic cycle.
NEMO	NF-kappa-B essential modulator
Methuselah-like proteins	Named for Methuselah, extends the lifespan of an organism
MTHFR1	Short for METHYLENETETRAHYDROFOLATE REDUCTASE 1
NUDEL-Gen	German for "Noodle", NudE Neurodevelopment Protein 1 Like 1
RING	Short for Really Interesting New Gene
POKEMON	POK erythroid myeloid ontogenic factor, changed to Zbtb7 after a lawsuit was threatened
Pikachurin	Named after Pikachu, a species and mascot of the Pokémon franchise
PUMPKIN	Short for PLASTID 55 UMP KINASE, encodes a functional UMP Kinase located in the plastid that binds to group II intron plastid transcription products. Mutants show decreased accumulation of target transcripts/proteins.
Salvador	Protein salvador homolog 1 is a protein that in humans is encoded by the SAV1 gene
Scramblase	An enzyme that "scrambles" phospholipids between the inside and outside of the cell membrane
SisyphusPhrime	Arthrobacter phage named after Sisyphus Prime from the video game ULTRAKILL.
Slingshot homolog	
Slit-Robo and the associated Netrin-Frazzled	
SMURF1 and SMURF2,	SMAD Ubiquitination Regulatory Factor 1/2, interacts with Mothers against decapentaplegic 7
Son of Sevenless	A protein involved in MAPK signal cascade
SPOCK1	Zebrafish with this mutation develop pointed-ears reminiscent of Spock
SWEET transporters	Sugars will eventually be exported transporter, transports sugar
Swiss cheese	Mutations cause the brain to develop with lesions resembling Swiss cheese
Spätzle	based on the spaetzle-like (German for a type of noodle) shape of the larvae of D. melanogaster
Tafazzin	Named after the masochistic comic character Tafazzi (portrayed by Giacomo Poretti, member of the Italian comedy trio Aldo, Giovanni e Giacomo) after alleged hardships in its discovery
Time for Coffee	Regulator of circadian clock in Arabidopsis thaliana
Tinman gene	Named for the tinman who was lacking a heart, model organisms with mutations in tinman had cardiac abnormalities
Toll-like receptors	"Toll" is German for "Amazing", "Awesome". Christiane Nüsslein-Volhard and her colleague Prof. Eric Wieschaus sat at a double microscope that allows two people to examine the same object at the same time. When they saw an embryo mutant one day whose development was ventralised, they were both completely surprised and spontaneously exclaimed "Toll" (great).
UNICORN	Regulates planar growth in Arabidopsis thaliana
The following genes in the Arabidopsis thaliana HD-ZIP III family: REVOLUTA (REV); PHABULOSA (PHB); PHAVOLUTA (PHV)	REVOLUTA was first described in 1995, while PHABULOSA and PHAVOLUTA were described in 2001. PHB and PHV were intentionally given similar-sounding names to REV because of their related mutant phenotypes and functions in regulating shoot and leaf development.
The following genes related to stomata development in Arabidopsis thaliana: SPEECHLESS (SPCH); MUTE; FAMA; SCREAM 1/2 (SCRM1/SCRM2)	Stomata in Arabidopsis resemble mouths under the microscope. SPEECHLESS (SPCH), MUTE, and FAMA act sequentially during stomatal lineage development. Accordingly, SPCH mutants lack stomata; MUTE mutants arrest stomatal development at the meristemoid stage; while FAMA mutants produce clusters of overproliferated stomatal lineage cells that resemble stacked mouths. FAMA is named after Fama, the Greek goddess of rumor and fame. SCREAM1/2 (SCRM1/2) promote stomatal lineage development and, when mutated, cause an increased number of meristemoids and consequently an increased number of stomata - which appear as a field of screaming mouths.
BODENLOS (BDL) & TOPLESS (TPL) in the Arabidopsis thaliana auxin response pathway	BODENLOS (BDL) means "bottomless" in German; bdl embryos fail to form the embryonic root meristem, giving rise to rootless seedlings. TOPLESS (TPL) is named for the topless mutant phenotype, in which the embryonic shoot (apical pole) is transformed into a second root (basal pole), effectively losing its "top." Both genes are involved in auxin-dependent embryonic patterning.
SCHENGEN (SGN) in Arabidopsis thaliana casparian strip formation	The casparian strip controls entry of water and nutrients; an SGN mutant forms a discontinued casparian strip. The name is a reference to the Schengen Agreement relating to boarder control in europe.
The artificial CRASH-IT safety switch system	The Chemically Regulated - SH2-delivered Inhibitory Tail is designed to control genetically engineered CAR-T and TCR-T cells. As in, crashing a car.

=== Controversies ===
Unusual names have caused issues for scientists explaining genetic diseases to lay-people, such as when an individual is affected by a gene with an offensive or insensitive name. This has particularly been noted in patients with a defect in the sonic hedgehog gene pathway and the disease formerly named CATCH22 for "cardiac anomaly, T-cell deficit, clefting and hypocalcaemia for chromosome 22q11.2 microdeletions". This name was abandoned due to the no-win connotations.

In 1993 Alfonso Martinez Arias, a researcher at the University of Cambridge, was ordered to change the name of the gene he had discovered, VELCRO, because of copyright issues with Velcro. The gene was renamed to puckered. In 2005, Pokémon threatened to sue the discoverer of POKEMON because the name was attracting attention when its link to the development of cancer was published.

== Molecules ==
- Moronic acid, a natural triterpene
- Traumatic acid, a monounsaturated dicarboxylic acid naturally occurring in plants

== Species ==
Some species with unusual scientific names, because of length, repetition, or origin or meaning of name, include:

- Agra vation
- Aha ha
- Allobates niputidea (the specific name means "no fucking clue" in Spanish)
- Ameronothrus retweet and Ameronothrus twitter
- Amorphophallus yaoi
- Anableps anableps
- Argentina
- Ba humbugi
- Bajacalifornia
- Bazinga
- Boops boops
- Bremia krungthepmahanakhonamonrattanakosinmahintharayuthayamahadilokphopnoppharatratchathaniburiromudomratchaniwetmahasathanamonpimanawatansathitsakkathattiyawitsanukamprasitnonopsis, the current longest scientific name
- Bremia o, the species with the shortest specific epithet
- Careproctus comus (whose name translates to "comical-looking anus face")
- Colon rectum
- Torpedo torpedo
- Crash bandicoot
- Crikey steveirwini
- Cyrtodactylus australotitiwangsaensis
- Dinosaurus
- Distorsio anus
- Dracula
- Drinker
- Dziwneono ("Dziwne ono" means "it is strange" in Polish)
- Emo vorticaudum
- Extra extra
- Foa fo
- Funny valentine
- Gasosaurus (named for a gas drilling company in China where it was found)
- Gelae baen, Gelae donut, Gelae belae, and Gelae fish
- Stupidogobius flavipinnis
- Gorilla gorilla gorilla
- Griseotyrannus aurantioatrocristatus
- Han solo
- Haya
- Heerz lukenatcha and Heerz tooya
- Homo erectus
- Hotwheels sisyphus
- Ia io (the shortest species name, tied with Yi qi)
- Irritator challengeri
- Kamera lens
- La cerveza, La cucaracha and La paloma, moths whose names translate in Spanish to "The beer", "The cockroach" (a popular Spanish folk song) and "The dove" (also a popular Spanish song)
- Labia minor
- Lagiacrusichthys
- Lento lento (meaning "slow slow" in several Romance languages)
- Lomankus edgecombei
- Lutra lutra
- Magnapaulia (translating to "large Paul")
- Megaloblatta longipennis
- Metallica
- Mini ature, Mini mum, and Mini scule
- Myxococcus llanfairpwllgwyngyllgogerychwyrndrobwllllantysiliogogogochensis
- Parastratiosphecomyia stratiosphecomyioides
- Pantydraco
- Penstemon whippleanus
- Phallus
- Pinus rigida
- Bison bison bison
- Punk ferox
- Salsa tartara (meaning "tartar sauce" in Spanish)
- Socca pleia
- Spongiforma squarepantsii
- Smegmamorpha
- Turdus maximus
- Tuta absoluta
- Umma gumma
- Upupa epops
- Unguinychus onyx
- Ursus arctos arctos
- Vini vidivici
- Wakiewakie lawsoni
- Whakamoke guacamole
- Yi qi (the shortest species name, tied with Ia io)
- Zig zag
- Zygonemertes cocacola

Some species with unusual biological common names include:

- A.E.E.C.L.'s sportive lemur
- Atlantic gymnast, a species of fish
- Batman moth
- Bastard, a species of mussel, however the name is shared with Gadus morhua, a species of fish
- Bastard Cavalley Pilot, a species of fish
- Bastard eel
- Bastard Margaret, a species of fish
- Bastard sturgeon, a species of fish
- Bony-eared assfish
- Bride, a species of moth
- Brother moth
- Bulldog catshark, which is not a bull, dog, bulldog, or cat, a species of shark
- Can-opener smoothdream, a species of fish
- Cheesy bug (UK), Chuckie Pig (US), Doodlebug (US), Pissebed ("Bed pisser" in Dutch), Smooth Randy (Global), Roly Poly/Rollie Pollie (Various countries in the Anglosphere), and other names for Armadillidiidae. Notable for variety of names in addition to unusual nature of names.
- Chilipepper, a species of fish
- Chub, a type of fish
- Dik-dik
- Dirty ordure snapper, a species of fish
- Doormat parkinglightfish
- Dumb gulper shark
- E.T. sponge
- Florida pirate, a species of fly
- Freak, a species of butterfly
- Furry coffinfish
- German cousin, a species of moth
- Happy Eddie, a species of shark
- Happy moments, a species of fish
- Hairy balls, a species of plant
- Harry hotlips, a species of fish
- H-animal, an enigmatic, extinct animal
- Heck cattle
- Hornyhead chub or jerker, a species of fish
- Humuhumunukunukuāpuaʻa, a species of fish
- Infant, a species of moth
- Jackass morwong, a species of fish
- Joker moth
- Laugher, a species of moth
- Lettuce shark, a species of moth
- Little devil, a species of moth
- Malaysian exploding ant or suicide ant
- Mealybug destroyer, a species of beetle
- Minipizza batfish
- Mountain chicken, a species of frog
- Neighbor moth
- Newcastle Big Boy, a species of funnel-web spider
- Nonconformist, a species of moth
- Obese dragonfish
- Old wife, however the name is shared with Balistes vetula, Diplodus ascensionis, Diplodus helenae, Spondyliosoma cantharus, and Trachinotus goodei, all species of fish
- Pikachu moth
- Sexy shrimp
- Sallow kitten, a species of moth
- Shark catfish
- Shortarse feelerfish
- Slippery dick, a species of fish
- Snoutlet crotchfeeler, a species of fish
- Southern old lady moth
- Southwestern ruffian, a species of fly
- Stout infantfish
- Suspected, a species of moth
- The murderer, a species of jumping spider
- The uncertain, a species of moth
- Tit, a type of bird
- Wahoo, a species of fish
- Y-animal, an enigmatic, extinct animal
- Yellow fly of the dismal swamp, a species of biting fly
- Windfucker, a species of bird

== Techniques ==
- Chromatin Interaction Analysis by Paired-End Tag Sequencing (ChIA-PET) is a technique to determine chromatin interactions which shares a name with Chia Pets.
- CRISPy TAKO (CRISPR Turbo Accelerated KnockOut) ("crispy taco") is a gene knockout technique useful for in vivo reverse genetic screens.
- FISH (Fluorescence in situ hybridization) is a technique using fluorescent probes that bind to specific nucleic acid sequences. Fluorescence microscopy is used to detect the probes, and this can be used to find specific DNA sequences on chromosomes.
- GluSnFR (Glutamate-sensitive fluorescent reporter) ("glue-sniffer") is a genetically engineered protein used to monitor glutamate release into the synapse.
- KINC ("Kink") is a computer program used to generate co-expression networks
- SHREC (single-molecule high-resolution colocalization) ("Shrek") is a modified labeling technique named after a titular character in the movie Shrek. Its older sister technique FIONA is still used as well.
- TILLING (Targeting Induced Local Lesions in Genomes) is a reverse genetics technique used to induce and find mutations in a specific gene. Developed in plants, this technique shares a name with the agricultural preparation of soil. Mutations are caused randomly in many plants (with EMS mutagenesis), and the plants are screened for mutations in the gene of interest.

== See also ==
- List of chemical compounds with unusual names
