= MAP kinase kinase kinase kinase =

Family of proteins

Mitogen-activated protein kinase kinase kinase kinase (MAP4K) is a family of proteins involved in cellular signal transduction. MAP4Ks are involved in regulating cellular processes, including proliferation, differentiation, migration, and apoptosis. There are currently seven identified MAP4Ks.

- MAP4K1 (aka HPK1)
- MAP4K2 (aka GCK)
- MAP4K3 (aka GLK) - plays a role in TCR mediated immune responses and cell signaling.
- MAP4K4 (aka HGK) - involved in cell proliferation and migration.
- MAP4K5 (aka KHS)
- MAP4K6 (aka MINK) - poorly described enzyme that has been linked to hepatocellular carcinoma (HCC).
- MAP4K7 (aka TNIK)

== Images ==
Some signal transduction pathways. MAP4K is not labelled.

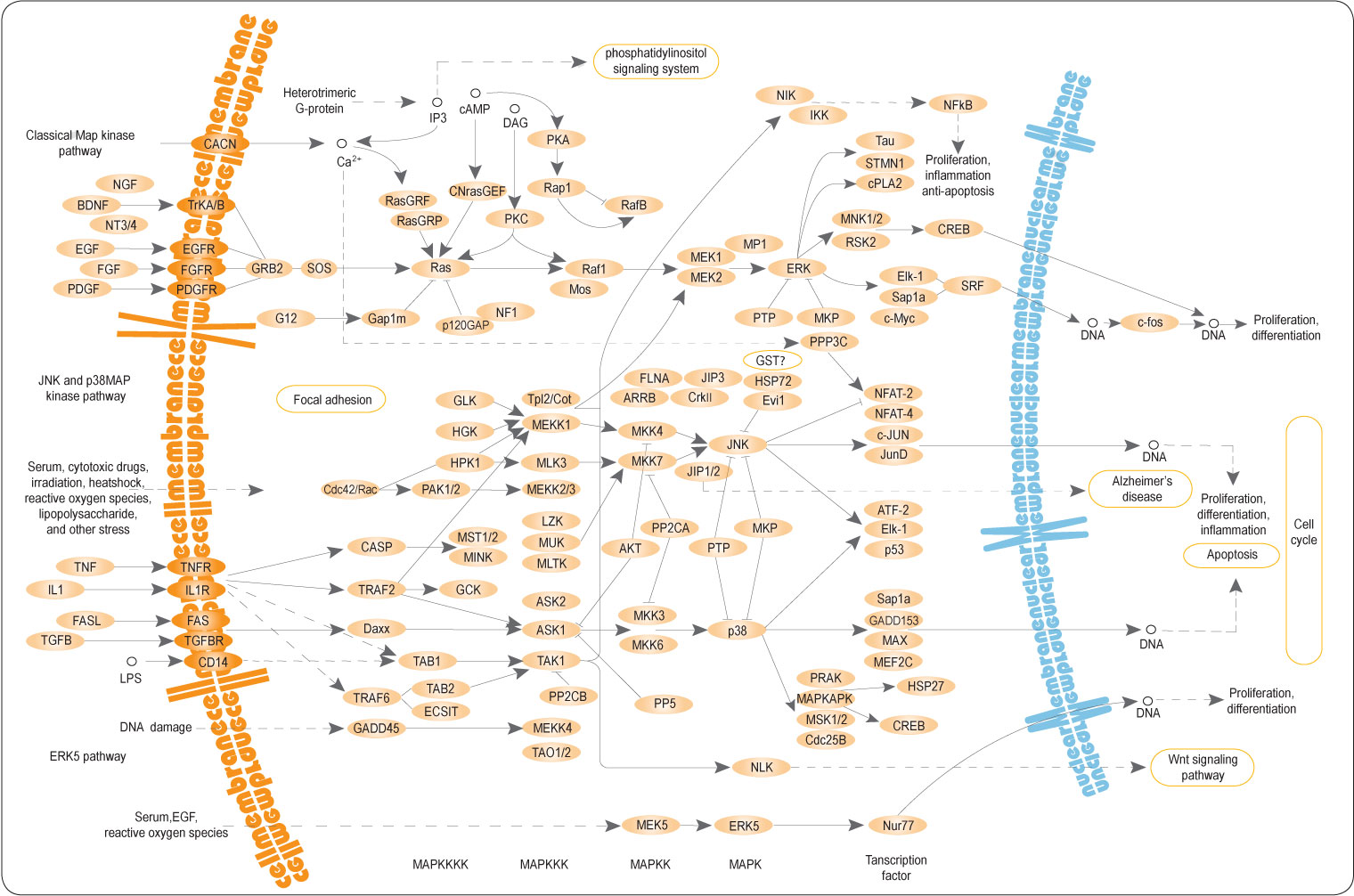
MAPK pathway. Some (or all) of the MAP4Ks in this image are labelled by other names, such as HPK1 and GCK.

== See also ==
- Signal transduction
- MAP kinase
- MAP kinase kinase
- MAP kinase kinase kinase
- List of unusual biological names
