= La Cucaracha (disambiguation) =

"La Cucaracha" is a traditional Spanish-language folk song.

La Cucaracha may also refer to:

- La Cucaracha (comic strip), a daily comic strip running 2002–present
- La Cucaracha (1934 film), a 1934 film that was one of the first live-action shorts in three color Technicolor
- La Cucaracha (1959 film), a 1959 Mexican film
- La Cucaracha (1998 film), a 1998 American film from director Jack Perez
- La Cucaracha (album), a 2007 album by Ween
- La Cucaracha (horse), a racehorse
- La cucaracha (moth), a moth in the family Crambidae
- La Cucaracha (newspaper), a former newspaper in Pueblo, Colorado
- La Cucaracha, a former roller coaster at Six Flags Over Texas
- Pancho Villa (1878–1923), Mexican revolutionary

== See also ==
- Kukaracha, 1982 Soviet film
