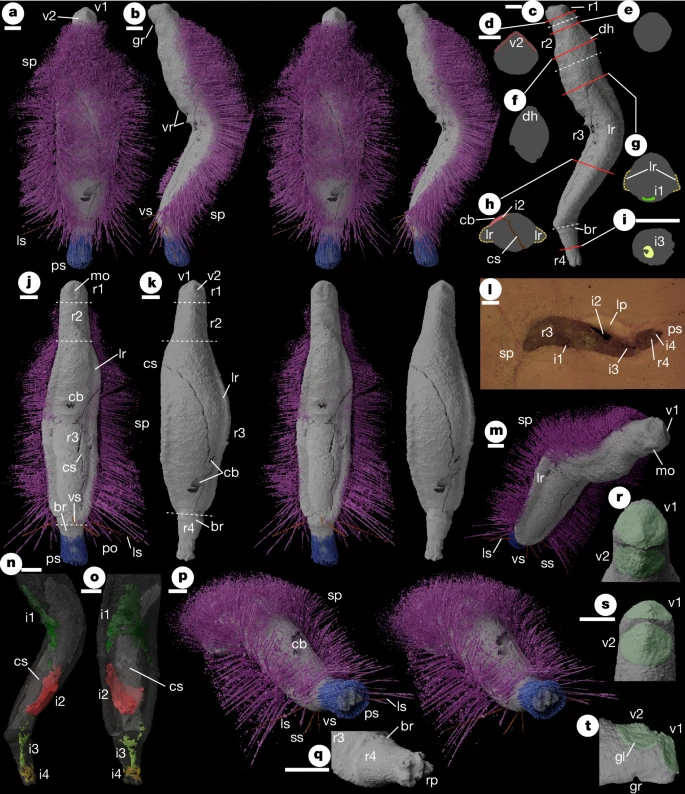
- Holotype fossil of Emo vorticaudum

Scientific classification
- Domain: Eukaryota
- Kingdom: Animalia
- Phylum: Mollusca
- Class: Aplacophora
- Genus: †Emo; Sutton et al, 2025
- Species: †E. vorticaudum

Binomial name
- †Emo vorticaudum Sutton et al, 2025

= Emo vorticaudum =

Emo vorticaudum Temporal range: Homerian

Extinct genus of aplacophoran

Emo is a genus of aplacophoran mollusc known from the Homerian Coalbrookdale Formation of England. It contains one species, Emo vorticaudum. This genus is likely related to Acaenoplax on account of the combination of valves and spicules, alongside the lack of a foot.

== Description ==
Emo lacks a foot, similar to modern aplacophorans (and different to its apparent relative Punk). Its body is weakly dorsoventrally compressed with a fold near the midpoint. Its body consists of four regions, the first being a short head with two small valves. These valves are suboval with a seeming lack of ornamentation except for a growth line, alongside flanking a median ridge. A raised region in the middle of this head's ventral side with a faint hollow is interpreted as the mouth. The second body region of Emo consists of a wider neck with a dorsal hump and no apparent separation between the dorsal and ventral regions of the animal. The main body (region 3) bears "lateral rolls" separating the dorsal and ventral surfaces, alongside sharing the presence of long spicules with the neck. The scleritome has a gap towards the anterior, for unknown reasons, alongside four posterior spines in different directions to the rest. The final body region is a tail, subcircular in cross-section, which bears a rotationally twisted spine array alongside poorly preserved protuberances interpreted as gills.

== Etymology ==
The genus name Emo derives from "the emo musical genre related to punk rock, whose exponents canonically bear long 'bangs' or fringes, of which the scleritome is reminiscent, as well as studded clothing recalling the anterior valves". The specific name vorticaudum derives from the Latin words "vortex" (whirl) and "cauda" (tail), in reference to the rotational twisting of the tail spines.

== See also ==
- List of unusual biological names
