= Tin Man =

Tin Man may refer to:

- Tin Woodman, a character in the fictional Land of Oz created by American author L. Frank Baum
- Ted McMinn (born 1962), footballer nicknamed The Tin Man
- Tinman (born 1961), British electronic musician
- Tinsmith, a tinman or worker in tin

== Film and television ==
- The Tin Man (1935 film), a 1935 short film starring Thelma Todd and Patsy Kelly
- Tin Man (1983 film), a 1983 film starring Timothy Bottoms and directed by John G. Thomas
- "Tin Man" (Stargate SG-1), an episode of the science fiction television series Stargate SG-1
- "Tin Man" (Star Trek: The Next Generation), a 1990 episode from the third season of Star Trek: The Next Generation
- Tin Man (miniseries), a modern re-imagining of The Wonderful Wizard of Oz on the Sci Fi Channel

== Music ==
- "Tin Man" (America song), 1974
- "The Tin Man" (Kenny Chesney song), 1994
- "Tin Man" (Miranda Lambert song), 2016

== Other ==
- The Tin Man (novel), a 1998 novel by best-selling American writer Dale Brown
- The Tin Man (American horse), Thoroughbred racehorse
- The Tin Man (British horse), Thoroughbred racehorse
- Tin Man, a 2017 novel by Sarah Winman
- tinman (gene), Drosophila melanogaster with mutant forms of this gene do not develop a heart

== See also ==
- Tin Men, 1987 movie
- The Tin Men, 1965 novel by Michael Frayn
