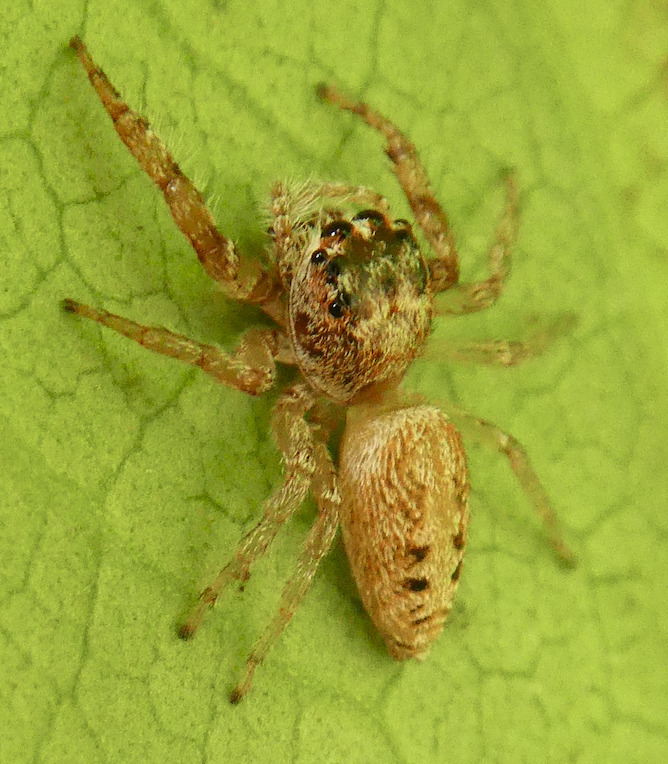
- Female Opisthoncus nigrofemoratus

Scientific classification
- Kingdom: Animalia
- Phylum: Arthropoda
- Subphylum: Chelicerata
- Class: Arachnida
- Order: Araneae
- Infraorder: Araneomorphae
- Family: Salticidae
- Genus: Opisthoncus
- Species: O. nigrofemoratus

Binomial name
- Opisthoncus nigrofemoratus L. Koch, 1881

= Opisthoncus nigrofemoratus =

Species of spider

Opisthoncus nigrofemoratus is a species of jumping spider in the family Salticidae, native to Australia. It is found mainly in Victoria, New South Wales and South Australia, where it inhabits gardens, bushland, and suburban foliage.

The species is named for its distinctively black femora (thigh segments), particularly visible in adult males. It is often confused with other garden jumping spider species such as Opisthoncus polyphemus due to the presence of these dark legs as well as similar carapace and abdominal patterning.

== Description ==
Adults are relatively small, reaching up to 9mm. The body for juveniles is often a pale white with brownish features, as well as black abdominal patterns. Mature males will display black-marked femora, these being a brown colour in females. The abdomen typically shows rows of black blotches or paired spots, with some individuals showing only faint markings.

Males exhibit larger, more swollen pedipalps used for mating and often have a darker cephalothorax with distinct facial markings. Unlike O. polyphemus, which frequently shows three black dots atop the width of the carapace, O. nigrofemoratus displays a dark central band.

== Taxonomy ==
Opisthoncus nigrofemoratus was first described by L. Koch in his 1881 Die Arachniden Australiens, and was based on a single male specimen which is now recognised as the holotype under modern nomenclatural standards. This holotype is preserved at the Zoologisches Museum Hamburg (ZMH 2257) and was collected from Brisbane, Australia. The species has remained in the genus Opisthoncus since its initial description, and no additional syntypes were designated, as only one specimen was used in the original account.

== Gallery ==
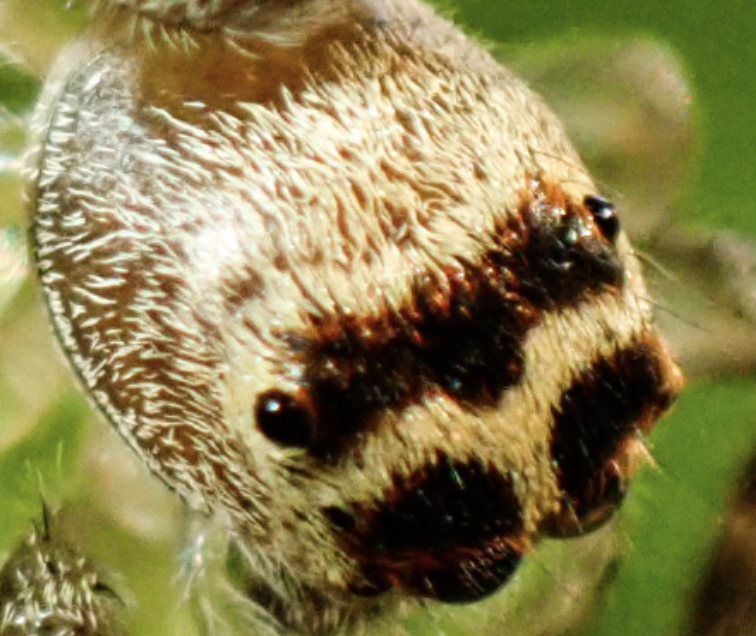
Top-down view of O. nigrofemoratus carapace

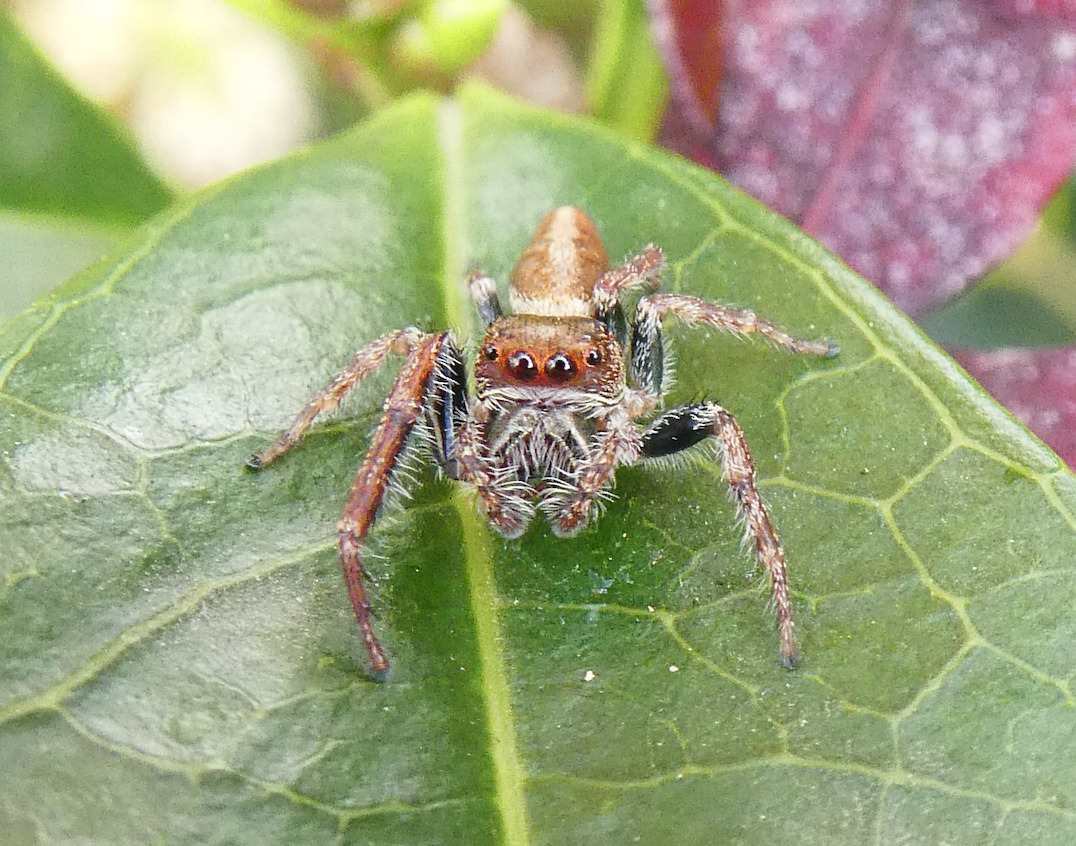
A fully developed male O. nigrofemoratus

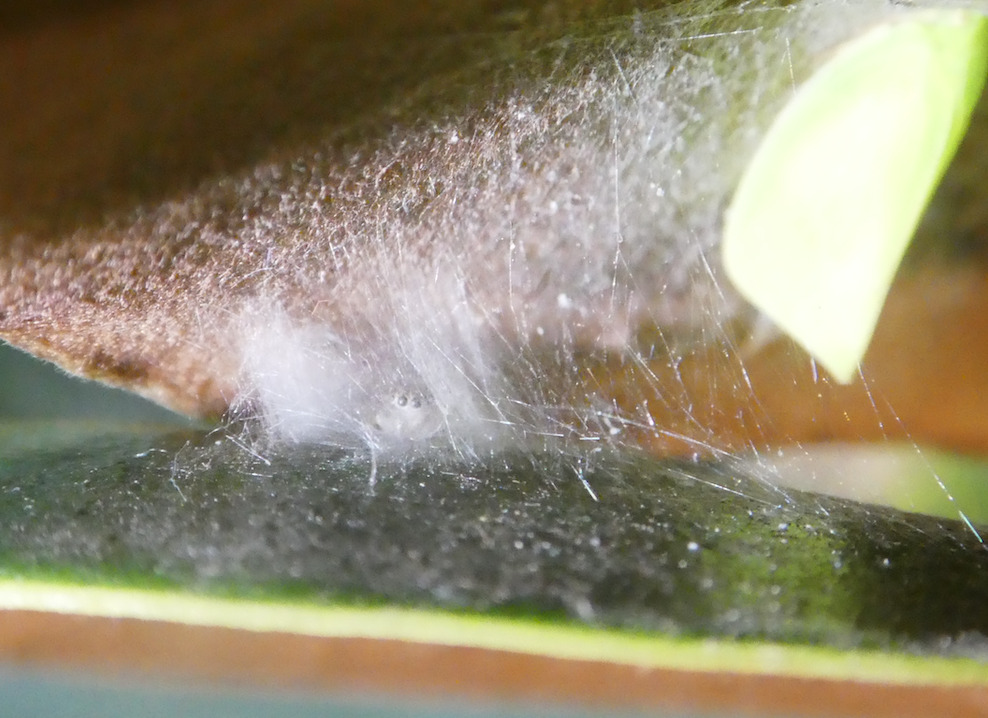
A fully developed male O. nigrofemoratus
