= Ameronothrus =

Scientific classification
- Domain: Eukaryota
- Kingdom: Animalia
- Phylum: Arthropoda
- Subphylum: Chelicerata
- Class: Arachnida
- Order: Oribatida
- Family: Ameronothridae
- Genus: Ameronothrus; Berlese, 1896

Genus of mites

Ameronothrus is a genus of oribatid mites in the family Ameronothridae. There are about 13 described species in Ameronothrus.

== Species ==
These 13 species belong to the genus Ameronothrus:

- Ameronothrus bilineatus (Michael, 1888)
- Ameronothrus lineatus (Thorell, 1871)
- Ameronothrus maculatus (Michael, 1882)
- Ameronothrus marinus (Banks, 1896)
- Ameronothrus nidicola (Sitnikova, 1975)
- Ameronothrus nigrofemoratus (L. Koch, 1879)
- Ameronothrus retweet (Pfingstl & Shimano, 2022)
- Ameronothrus schneideri (Oudemans, 1905)
- Ameronothrus schubarti (Weigmann & Schulte, 1975)
- Ameronothrus schusteri (Schubart, 1970)
- Ameronothrus twitter (Pfingstl & Shimano, 2021)
- Ameronothrus yoichi (Pfingstl & Shimano, 2019)
