= La benepunctalis =

Scientific classification
- Kingdom: Animalia
- Phylum: Arthropoda
- Class: Insecta
- Order: Lepidoptera
- Family: Crambidae
- Genus: La
- Species: L. benepunctalis

Binomial name
- La benepunctalis (Hampson, 1919)

Synonyms
- Neerupa benepunctalis Hampson, 1919

Species of moth

La benepunctalis is a moth in the family Crambidae. It was described by George Hampson in 1919. It is found in Peru.
