= Colon schwarzi =

Scientific classification
- Domain: Eukaryota
- Kingdom: Animalia
- Phylum: Arthropoda
- Class: Insecta
- Order: Coleoptera
- Suborder: Polyphaga
- Infraorder: Staphyliniformia
- Family: Leiodidae
- Genus: Colon
- Species: C. schwarzi

Binomial name
- Colon schwarzi Hatch, 1933

Species of beetle

Colon schwarzi is a species of round fungus beetle in the family Leiodidae. It is found in North America.
