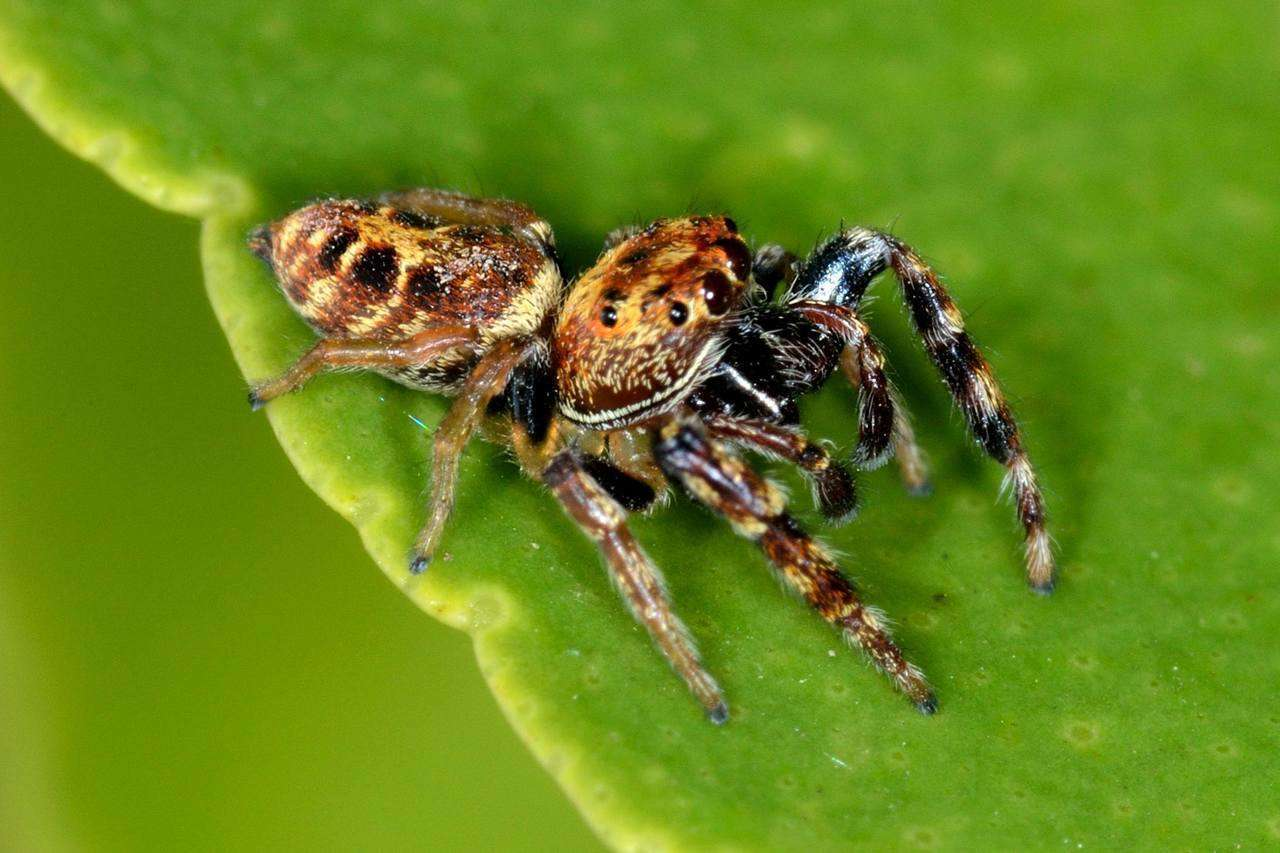

- 1846 drawing by CL Koch

Scientific classification
- Kingdom: Animalia
- Phylum: Arthropoda
- Subphylum: Chelicerata
- Class: Arachnida
- Order: Araneae
- Infraorder: Araneomorphae
- Family: Salticidae
- Genus: Opisthoncus
- Species: O. sexmaculatus

Binomial name
- Opisthoncus sexmaculatus (C. L. Koch, 1846)

Synonyms
- Plexippus sexmaculatus C. L. Koch, 1846; Gangus sexmaculatus (C. L. Koch, 1846)

= Opisthoncus sexmaculatus =

Species of jumping spider

Opisthoncus sexmaculatus is a species of jumping spider in the genus Opisthoncus. It is endemic to Australia, where it has been recorded only from New South Wales.

The species name sexmaculatus is Latin meaning "six-spotted", referring to the pattern on the opisthosoma.

== Taxonomy ==
The species was originally described by Carl Ludwig Koch in 1846 as Plexippus sexmaculatus.

Eugène Simon transferred the species to the genus Gangus in 1903. Marek Żabka later moved it to its current genus Opisthoncus in 1991, transferring it from Gangus (which is a synonym of Thyene).

== Distribution ==
Opisthoncus sexmaculatus is known only from New South Wales, Australia. The holotype was collected from "New Holland" (an old name for Australia) by the collector Preiss.

== Description ==
Only the female of Opisthoncus sexmaculatus has been described; the male remains unknown.

The female has a round cephalothorax that is pale brown in colour, with the eye field being dark brown. The cephalothorax is covered with greyish and yellow scales and hairs, while the area surrounding the eyes is almost black. The clypeus is pale brown and densely covered with numerous pale scales and setae. The chelicerae are brown, and the endites and labium are brown with yellow anterior margins. The sternum is relatively wide and yellow in color.

The opisthosoma is distinctively patterned, being mottled orange with a longitudinal pale streak and transverse orange stripes that are separated by almost black patches. It is covered with yellow scales and brownish hairs. The underside (venter) is pale, while the spinnerets are almost black. The legs are yellow-brownish in colour.

The epigyne has relatively small copulatory openings that are oriented towards the middle-front. The insemination ducts are moderately long, and the walls of the spermathecae are strongly sclerotized, while the accessory glands are rather inconspicuous. This species can be distinguished from similar species like O. polyphemus and O. serratofasciatus by the position of the spermathecae and the colour pattern of the abdomen.
