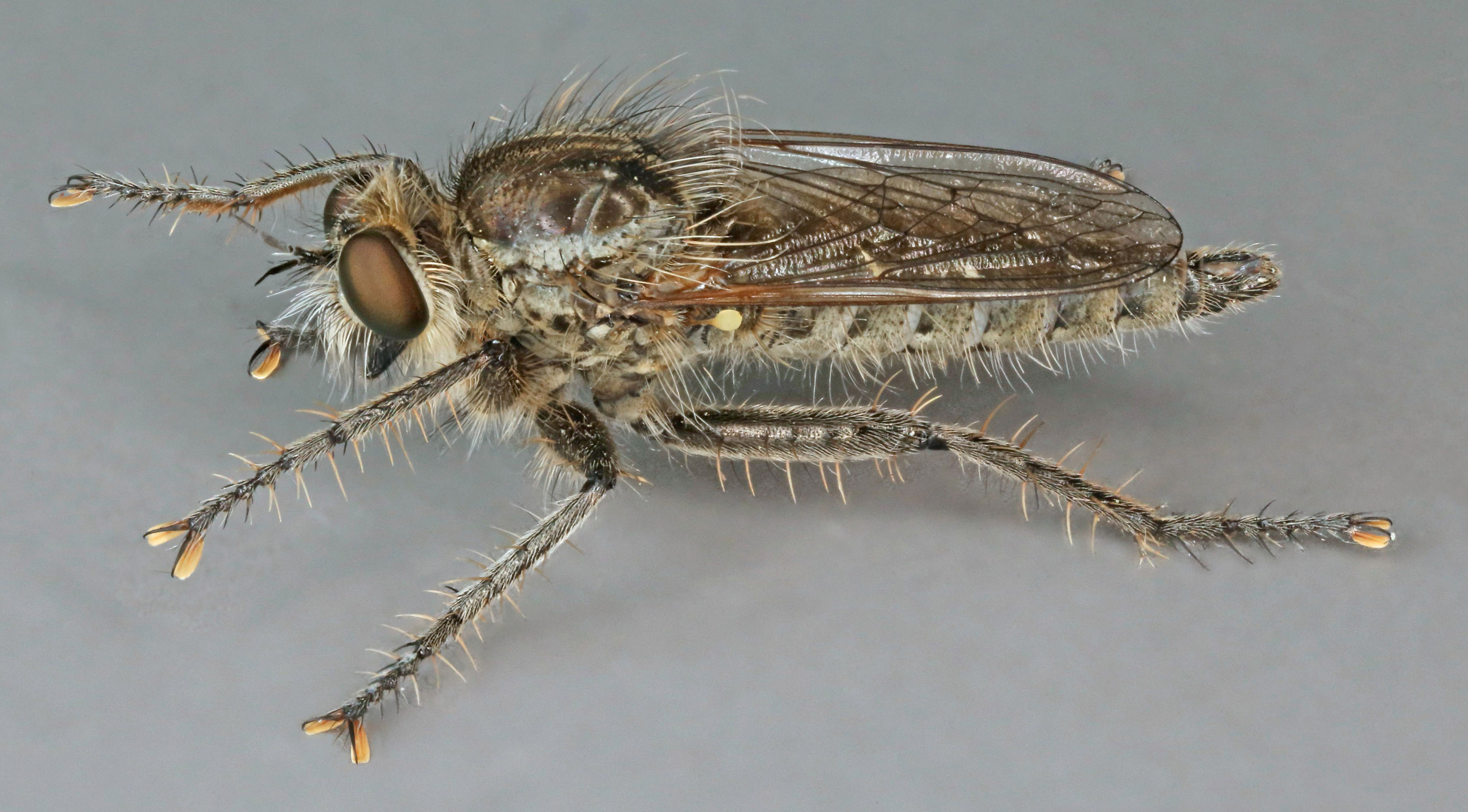
- Philonicus albiceps

Scientific classification
- Kingdom: Animalia
- Phylum: Arthropoda
- Class: Insecta
- Order: Diptera
- Family: Asilidae
- Subfamily: Asilinae
- Genus: Philonicus; Loew, 1849

= Philonicus =

Genus of flies

Philonicus is a genus of robber flies in the family Asilidae. There are at least 20 described species in Philonicus.

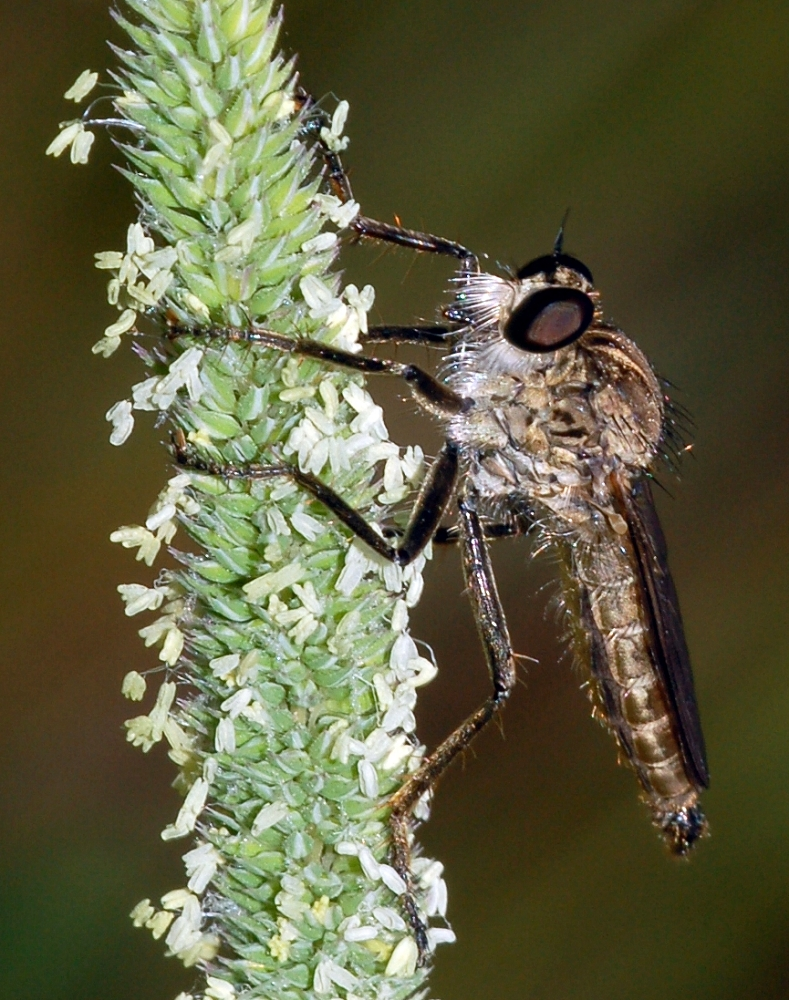
Philonicus albiceps

== Species ==
These 22 species belong to the genus Philonicus:

- Philonicus albiceps (Meigen, 1820)^{c g}
- Philonicus albospinosus (Bellardi, 1861)^{c g}
- Philonicus arizonensis (Williston, 1893)^{c g}
- Philonicus curtatus Oldroyd, 1964^{c g}
- Philonicus elutus Loew, 1871^{c g}
- Philonicus flebeius (Osten Sacken, 1887)^{c g}
- Philonicus fuliginosus (Bellardi, 1861)^{c g}
- Philonicus fuscatus (Hine, 1909)^{i c g b}
- Philonicus ghilarovi Lehr, 1988^{c g}
- Philonicus iliensis Lehr, 1970^{c g}
- Philonicus ionescui Tsacas, 1977^{c g}
- Philonicus limpidipennis (Hine, 1909)^{i c g}
- Philonicus longulus Wulp, 1872^{c g}
- Philonicus nagatomii Utsuki, 2008^{c g}
- Philonicus nigrosetosus Wulp, 1881^{c g}
- Philonicus plebeius Osten Sacken^{i c g b}
- Philonicus rufipennis Hine, 1907^{i c g b}
- Philonicus scaurus (Walker, 1849)^{c g}
- Philonicus sichanensis Tsacas, 1977^{c g}
- Philonicus truquii (Bellardi, 1861)^{i c g}
- Philonicus tuxpanganus (Bellardi, 1862)^{c g}
- Philonicus vagans (Wiedemann, 1828)^{c g}

Data sources: i = ITIS, c = Catalogue of Life, g = GBIF, b = Bugguide.net
