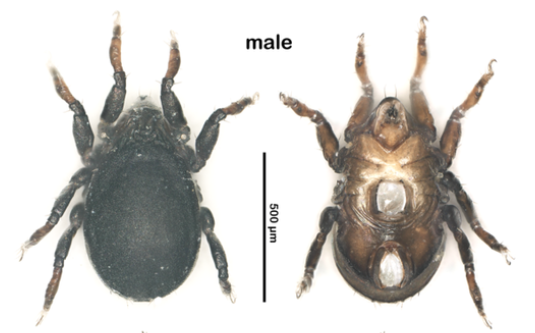
- Male mite

Scientific classification
- Kingdom: Animalia
- Phylum: Arthropoda
- Subphylum: Chelicerata
- Class: Arachnida
- Order: Oribatida
- Family: Ameronothridae
- Genus: Ameronothrus
- Species: A. retweet

Binomial name
- Ameronothrus retweet Pfingstl, Hiruta, Bardel-Kahr, Obae, Shimano 2022

= Ameronothrus retweet =

Species of marine mite

Ameronothrus retweet, commonly known as the Japanese retweet mite, is an oribatid mite, in the family Ameronothridae.

== Discovery ==
The recent unveiling of Ameronothrus twitter, via a social media platform, sparked significant media interest and heightened public awareness regarding these tiny organisms. This occurrence directly led to the unveiling of another new species, A. retweet, associated with marine habitats, also discovered through the same social media platform. Furthermore, the documentation of this newfound species, A. retweet, marks the initial identification of an ameronothroid species along the Sea of Japan coast, suggesting successful colonization in this area and the potential presence of further species. Notably, A. retweet displays striking sexual dimorphism, with females featuring relatively shorter legs and a prominently folded notogastral integument. Based on physical characteristics, it is suggested that the new species shares a close relationship with Ameronothrus lineatus and Ameronothrus nigrofemoratus. Moreover, a genetic analysis utilizing the 18S rRNA gene indicates a close association among all Ameronothrus species, forming a distinct monophyletic genus. In a broader evolutionary context, Fortuyniidae and Selenoribatidae are identified as sister taxa with a monophyletic origin, while certain members of Ameronothridae are positioned in paraphyletic groups, supporting the idea of an independent evolution of the marine-associated lifestyle among ameronothroid mites.

== Habitat ==
The habitat of the Japanese retweet mites is primarily situated along the Japanese coast, thriving in small, dark, and moist environments. These diminutive creatures find their niche in secluded corners, where they can flourish amidst the cool, damp conditions characteristic of their coastal abodes.
