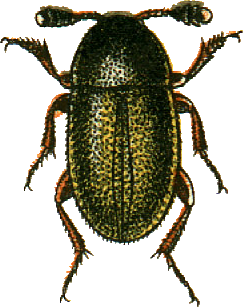
- Colon claviger

Scientific classification
- Kingdom: Animalia
- Phylum: Arthropoda
- Class: Insecta
- Order: Coleoptera
- Suborder: Polyphaga
- Infraorder: Staphyliniformia
- Family: Leiodidae
- Subfamily: Coloninae
- Genus: Colon; Herbst, 1797

= Colon (beetle) =

Genus of beetles

Colon is a genus of round fungus beetles in the family Leiodidae. There are at least 80 described species in Colon.

== Species ==
These 84 species belong to the genus Colon:

- Colon aedeagosum Hatch, 1957^{i g}
- Colon affine Sturm, 1839^{g}
- Colon angulare Erichson, 1837^{g}
- Colon appendiculatum (Sahlberg, 1822)^{g}
- Colon arcticum Munster, 1911^{g}
- Colon arcum Peck and Stephan, 1996^{i g}
- Colon armipes Kraatz, 1854^{g}
- Colon asperatum Horn, 1880^{i g b}
- Colon barcelonicum Pic, 1908^{g}
- Colon barnevillei Kraatz, 1858^{g}
- Colon basale Hatch, 1957^{i g}
- Colon beszedesi Depoli, 1915^{g}
- Colon bidentatum (Sahlberg, 1834)^{i g}
- Colon blatchleyi Peck and Stephan, 1996^{i g}
- Colon boreale Peck and Stephan, 1996^{i g}
- Colon brundini Palm, 1941^{g}
- Colon brunneum (Latreille, 1807)^{g}
- Colon calcaratum Erichson, 1837^{g}
- Colon californicum Peck and Stephan, 1996^{i g}
- Colon celatum Horn, 1880^{i g}
- Colon chenggongi Hoshina, 2009^{g}
- Colon chihuahua Peck and Stephan, 1996^{i g}
- Colon claviger Herbst, 1797^{g}
- Colon cloueti Guillebeau, 1896^{g}
- Colon curvipes Mäklin, 1880^{g}
- Colon delarouzei Tournier, 1863^{g}
- Colon dentatum LeConte, 1853^{i g b}
- Colon dentipes (Sahlberg, 1822)^{g}
- Colon discretum Hatch, 1933^{i g}
- Colon distinctipes Pic, 1901^{g}
- Colon elongatum Notman, 1919^{i g}
- Colon emarginatum Rosenhauer, 1856^{g}
- Colon forceps Hatch, 1957^{i g b}
- Colon fuscicorne Kraatz, 1852^{g}
- Colon grossum Peck and Stephan, 1996^{i g}
- Colon hatchi Peck and Stephan, 1996^{i g}
- Colon hesperium Peck and Stephan, 1996^{i g}
- Colon horni Szymczakowski, 1981^{i g}
- Colon hubbardi Horn, 1880^{i g b}
- Colon incisum Peck and Stephan, 1996^{i g}
- Colon inerme Mannerheim, 1852^{i g}
- Colon lableri Roubal, 1934^{g}
- Colon lanceolatum Hatch, 1957^{i g}
- Colon latum Kraatz, 1850^{g}
- Colon liebecki Wickham, 1902^{i g}
- Colon longitarse Reitter, 1884^{g}
- Colon longitorsum Peck & Stephan, 1996^{i g b}
- Colon magnicolle Mannerheim, 1853^{i g b}
- Colon megasetosum Peck & Stephan, 1996^{i g b}
- Colon mesum Peck and Stephan, 1996^{i g}
- Colon monstrosum Peck and Stephan, 1996^{i g}
- Colon moreanum Pic, 1910^{g}
- Colon murinum Kraatz, 1850^{g}
- Colon nitidum Peck and Stephan, 1996^{i g}
- Colon oblongum Blatchley, 1910^{i g b}
- Colon pacificum Peck and Stephan, 1996^{i g}
- Colon pararectum Peck and Stephan, 1996^{i g}
- Colon politum Peck and Stephan, 1996^{i g}
- Colon potosi Peck and Stephan, 1996^{i g}
- Colon pseudolatum Palm, 1941^{g}
- Colon pubescens Lucas, 1846^{g}
- Colon puncticeps Czwalina, 1884^{g}
- Colon puncticolle Kraatz, 1850^{g}
- Colon purkynei Fleischer, 1909^{g}
- Colon rectum Hatch, 1933^{i g}
- Colon robustum Obenberger, 1917^{g}
- Colon rufescens Kraatz, 1850^{g}
- Colon schwarzi Hatch, 1933^{i g b}
- Colon sekerae Reitter, 1909^{g}
- Colon serratum Hatch, 1957^{i g}
- Colon serripes (Sahlberg, 1822)^{g}
- Colon similare Peck and Stephan, 1996^{i g}
- Colon sinuatipes Reitter, 1911^{g}
- Colon stolzi Roubal, 1917^{g}
- Colon subcurvipes Reitter, 1885^{g}
- Colon thoracicum Horn, 1880^{i g b}
- Colon tibiale Hatch, 1957^{i g}
- Colon troglocerum Reitter, 1884^{g}
- Colon vancouverense Peck and Stephan, 1996^{i g}
- Colon viennense Herbst, 1797^{g}
- Colon xilitla Peck and Stephan, 1996^{i g}
- Colon zebei Kraatz, 1854^{g}

Data sources: i = ITIS, c = Catalogue of Life, g = GBIF, b = Bugguide.net
