= Beta-1,3-N-acetylglucosaminyltransferase radical fringe =

Protein-coding gene in the species Homo sapiens

RFNG

Identifiers
- Aliases: RFNG, RFNG O-fucosylpeptide 3-beta-N-acetylglucosaminyltransferase, Radical Fringe gene
- External IDs: OMIM: 602578; MGI: 894275; GeneCards: RFNG
Enzyme activity
EC #	BRENDA	ExPASy	KEGG	MetaCyc
2.4.1.222	↗	↗	↗	↗

Gene location (Human)
Chr.	Chromosome 17 (human)
Band	17q25.3	Start	82,047,902 bp
Band	17q25.3	End	82,051,831 bp

Gene location (Mouse)
Chr.	Chromosome 11 (mouse)
Band	11 E2|11 84.53 cM	Start	120,671,572 bp
Band	11 E2|11 84.53 cM	End	120,675,033 bp
RNA expression pattern
Bgee	Human / Mouse (ortholog); Top expressed in: right lobe of liver; right ovary; left ovary; muscle of thigh; stromal cell of endometrium; body of pancreas; right hemisphere of cerebellum; anterior pituitary; right uterine tube; canal of the cervix / Top expressed in: Ileal epithelium; entorhinal cortex; perirhinal cortex; fossa; CA3 field; condyle; substantia nigra; Paneth cell; primary visual cortex; motor neuron; More reference expression data
BioGPS	n/a
Gene ontology
Molecular function	transferase activity; O-fucosylpeptide 3-beta-N-acetylglucosaminyltransferase activity; metal ion binding; glycosyltransferase activity; molecular function; acetylglucosaminyltransferase activity
Cellular component	integral component of membrane; extracellular region; integral component of Golgi membrane; Golgi membrane; Golgi apparatus; membrane
Biological process	animal organ morphogenesis; pattern specification process; multicellular organism development; cell differentiation; positive regulation of protein binding; nervous system development; positive regulation of Notch signaling pathway; regulation of Notch signaling pathway; protein O-linked fucosylation
Sources:Amigo / QuickGO
Orthologs
Databases	NCBI: entry; OMA: entry
Species	Human	Mouse
Entrez	5986	19719
Ensembl	ENSG00000169733	ENSMUSG00000025158
UniProt	Q9Y644	O09009
RefSeq (mRNA)	NM_002917	NM_009053
RefSeq (protein)	NP_002908	NP_033079
Location (UCSC)	Chr 17: 82.05 – 82.05 Mb	Chr 11: 120.67 – 120.68 Mb
PubMed search
- Wikidata
View/Edit Human	View/Edit Mouse

Beta-1,3-N-acetylglucosaminyltransferase radical fringe, also known as radical fringe, is a protein that in humans is encoded by the RFNG gene. Radical fringe is a signaling enzyme involved in the arrangement of the embryonic limb buds. It is a member of the fringe gene family, which also includes manic fringe and lunatic fringe. It is important for the dorsoventrally patterning of the limb and has been implicated in the formation of the apical ectodermal ridge (AER). The AER is essential for the distal patterning of the limb. Experiments executed in chicken models show Radical fringe is expressed in both the dorsal ectoderm and the AER. This provides evidence that the AER forms from cells already expressing radical fringe, though further evidence is needed to confirm. Grafting experiments have shown that formation of the AER comes from signals in the limb bud mesoderm. However, radical fringe acts as a permissive signal to create a boundary for the AER to form. The knockout experiments done in chicken models suggest Radical fringe plays an integral role in wing development.

Conversely, knockout experiments in mice have shown that if Radical fringe is absent no phenotypic differences occur. Further study revealed the absence of mutation is most likely due to redundancy of Manic and Lunatic fringe, which likely take over in the absence of Radical fringe. Radical, Manic, and lunatic fringe genes make up a group of enzymes known as 3-beta-N-acetylglucosaminyltransferases. They elongate O-linked fucose residues on notch receptors, which effects neurogenesis through the notch signaling pathway. While Radical fringe may not be vital for limb formation in all species, current research suggests it plays an integral role in establishing the pattern of the developing limb when expressed.
