= Colon dentatum =

Scientific classification
- Domain: Eukaryota
- Kingdom: Animalia
- Phylum: Arthropoda
- Class: Insecta
- Order: Coleoptera
- Suborder: Polyphaga
- Infraorder: Staphyliniformia
- Family: Leiodidae
- Genus: Colon
- Species: C. dentatum

Binomial name
- Colon dentatum LeConte, 1853

Synonyms
- Colon pusillum Horn, 1880; Colon putum Horn, 1880; Colon rufum Hatch, 1933

Species of beetle

Colon dentatum is a species of round fungus beetle in the family Leiodidae. It is found in North America.
