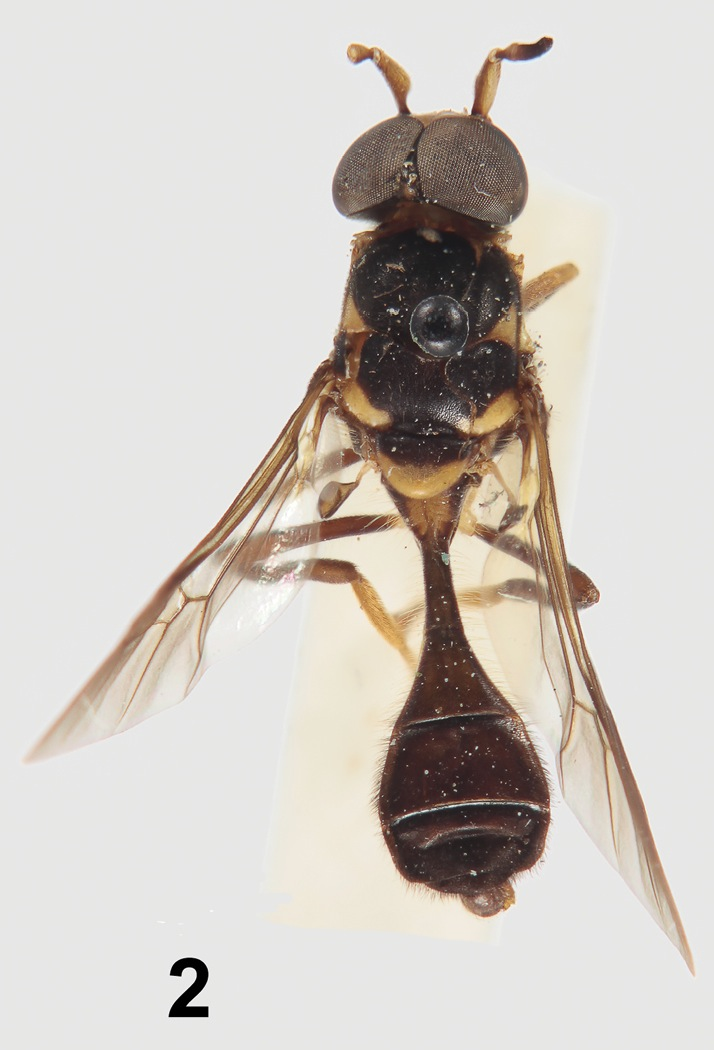
- Parastratiosphecomyia stratiosphecomyioides

Scientific classification
- Kingdom: Animalia
- Phylum: Arthropoda
- Class: Insecta
- Order: Diptera
- Family: Stratiomyidae
- Subfamily: Pachygastrinae
- Genus: Parastratiosphecomyia; Brunetti, 1923

Type species
- Parastratiosphecomyia stratiosphecomyioides Brunetti, 1923

= Parastratiosphecomyia =

Genus of flies

Parastratiosphecomyia is a genus of flies in the family Stratiomyidae.

== Species ==
- Parastratiosphecomyia freidbergi Woodley, 2012
- Parastratiosphecomyia rozkosnyi Woodley, 2012
- Parastratiosphecomyia stratiosphecomyioides Brunetti, 1923
- Parastratiosphecomyia szechuanensis Lindner, 1954

== Gallery ==
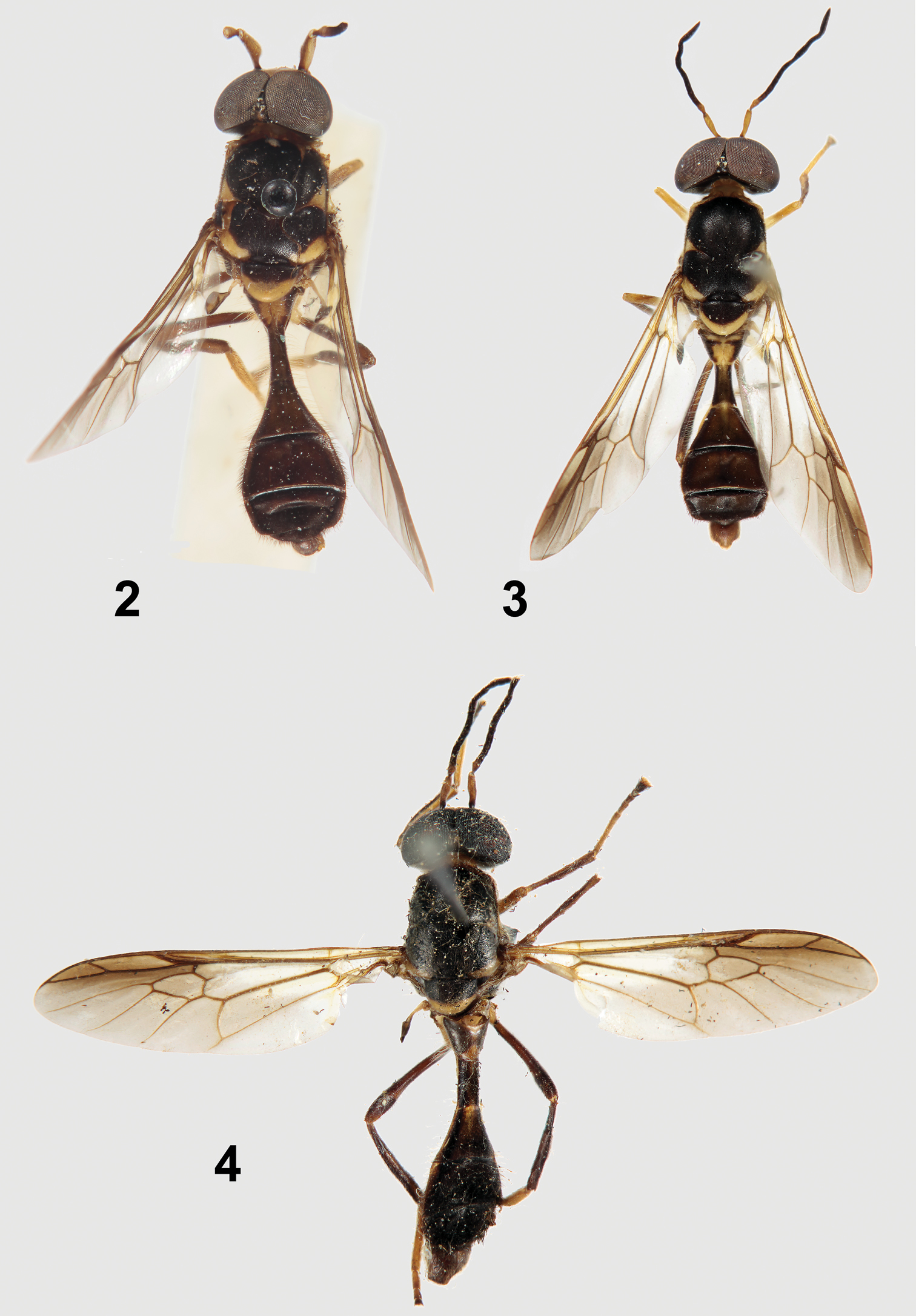
