= Philonicus rufipennis =

Scientific classification
- Domain: Eukaryota
- Kingdom: Animalia
- Phylum: Arthropoda
- Class: Insecta
- Order: Diptera
- Family: Asilidae
- Genus: Philonicus
- Species: P. rufipennis

Binomial name
- Philonicus rufipennis Hine, 1907

Species of fly

Philonicus rufipennis is a species of robber flies in the family Asilidae.
