= Colon thoracicum =

Scientific classification
- Domain: Eukaryota
- Kingdom: Animalia
- Phylum: Arthropoda
- Class: Insecta
- Order: Coleoptera
- Suborder: Polyphaga
- Infraorder: Staphyliniformia
- Family: Leiodidae
- Genus: Colon
- Species: C. thoracicum

Binomial name
- Colon thoracicum Horn, 1880

Synonyms
- Colon decore Casey, 1884

Species of beetle

Colon thoracicum is a species of round fungus beetle in the family Leiodidae. It is found in North America.
