= Colon hubbardi =

Scientific classification
- Domain: Eukaryota
- Kingdom: Animalia
- Phylum: Arthropoda
- Class: Insecta
- Order: Coleoptera
- Suborder: Polyphaga
- Infraorder: Staphyliniformia
- Family: Leiodidae
- Genus: Colon
- Species: C. hubbardi

Binomial name
- Colon hubbardi Horn, 1880

Synonyms
- Colon excisum Hatch, 1933; Colon kincaidi Hatch, 1933; Colon kinkaidi Hatch, 1933 (missp.); Colon productum Hatch, 1933

Species of beetle

Colon hubbardi is a species of round fungus beetle in the family Leiodidae. It is found in North America.
