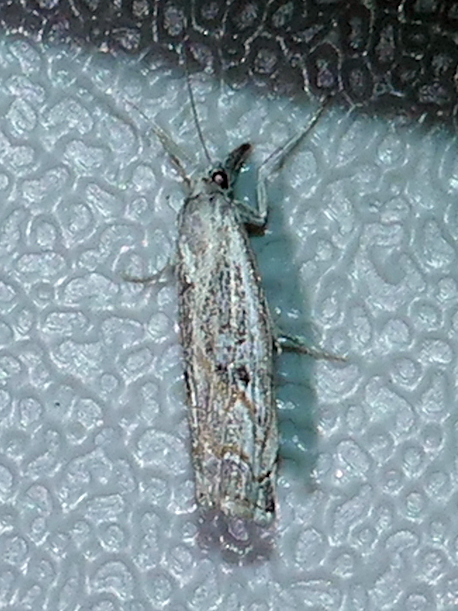
- La cerveza

Scientific classification
- Kingdom: Animalia
- Phylum: Arthropoda
- Clade: Pancrustacea
- Class: Insecta
- Order: Lepidoptera
- Family: Crambidae
- Subfamily: Crambinae
- Tribe: Crambini
- Genus: La; Bleszynski, 1966

= La (moth) =

Genus of moths

La is a genus of moths of the family Crambidae described by Stanisław Błeszyński in 1966, and found in the Americas. There are currently nine species in the genus. Three of them have been given punning names in Spanish: La cerveza, La cucaracha and La paloma, which translate to "The beer", "The cockroach" and "The dove" respectively.

== Species ==
- La benepunctalis (Hampson, 1919) (Peru)
- La cerveza Landry, 1995 (USA: Arizona, California, Colorado, Texas)
- La cucaracha Bleszynski, 1966 (Bolivia)
- La florenciae Landry & Léger, 2024 (Ecuador: Galápagos islands)
- La galapagensis Landry & Léger, 2024 (Ecuador: Galápagos islands)
- La grisea Landry & Léger, 2024 (Ecuador: Galápagos islands)
- La paloma Bleszynski, 1966 (Colombia)
- La paquitae Landry & Léger, 2024 (Ecuador: Galápagos islands)
- La wagneuri Landry & Léger, 2024 (Ecuador: Galápagos islands)
