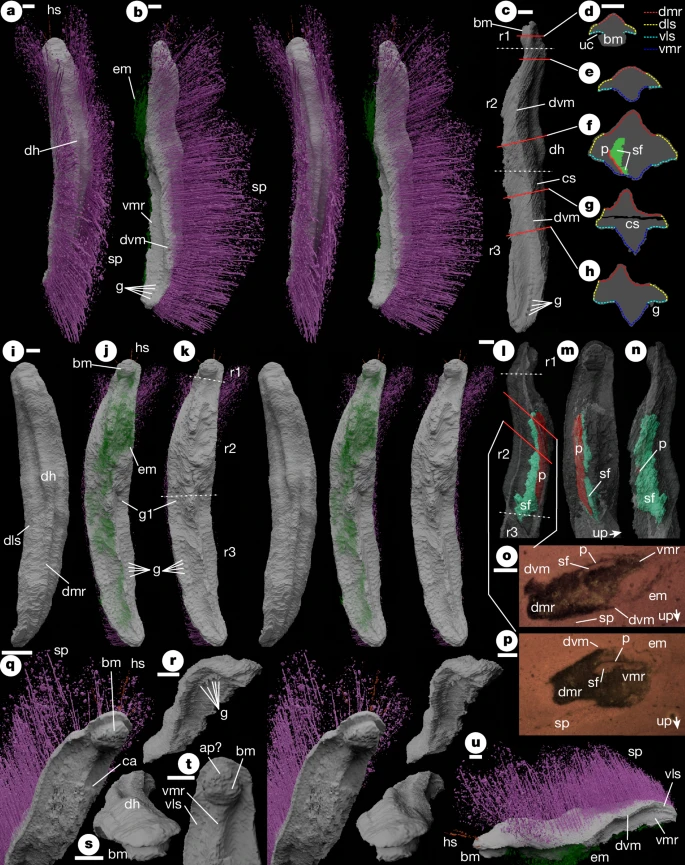
- Holotype fossil of Punk ferox

Scientific classification
- Domain: Eukaryota
- Kingdom: Animalia
- Phylum: Mollusca
- Class: Aplacophora
- Genus: †Punk; Sutton et al, 2025
- Species: †P. ferox

Binomial name
- †Punk ferox Sutton et al, 2025

= Punk ferox =

Punk ferox Temporal range: Homerian

Extinct species of aplacophoran

Punk ferox is a species of aplacophoran mollusc known from the Homerian Coalbrookdale Formation of England. It is the only species within the genus Punk.

== Description ==
Punk is elongate and vermiform, with rounded anterior and posterior ends. The dorsal surface bears a median ridge which widens near the anterior, with a low hump near the midpoint. The flanks of the ridge become more dorsolateral, meeting at the posterior tip of the animal. It lacks valves, instead bearing many long upwards-facing spines (likely mineralised spicules), with these fanning out near the anterior and the anterior margin bearing shorter "head spines". The dorsal surface is better preserved than the ventral, with a sharp margin between the two. The head is short with a subcylindrical boss possibly representing a buccal mass, alongside a sub-semicircular possible anterior plate. The posterior portion of Punk's trunk bears around 25 subconical projections near the median ridge, likely gills. A thin plate is preserved inside this ridge, likely displaced from an unknown original position.

== Etymology ==
The genus name Punk derives from a "fancied resemblance of the spicule array to the spiked hairstyles associated with the punk rock movement". The species name ferox translates to "bold" or "defiant", with no reason given.

== See also ==
- List of unusual biological names
