= Metallica (beetle) =

Scientific classification
- Domain: Eukaryota
- Kingdom: Animalia
- Phylum: Arthropoda
- Class: Insecta
- Order: Coleoptera
- Suborder: Adephaga
- Family: Carabidae
- Tribe: Lebiini
- Subtribe: Metallicina
- Genus: Metallica; Chaudoir, 1872

Genus of beetles

Metallica is a genus of beetles in the family Carabidae, containing the following species:

- Metallica aeneipennis (Dejean, 1831)
- Metallica capeneri Basilewsky, 1960
- Metallica mashunensis Peringuey, 1904
- Metallica purpuripennis Chaudoir, 1872
- Metallica rufoplagiata Basilewsky, 1956
- Metallica viridipennis Chaudoir, 1872
