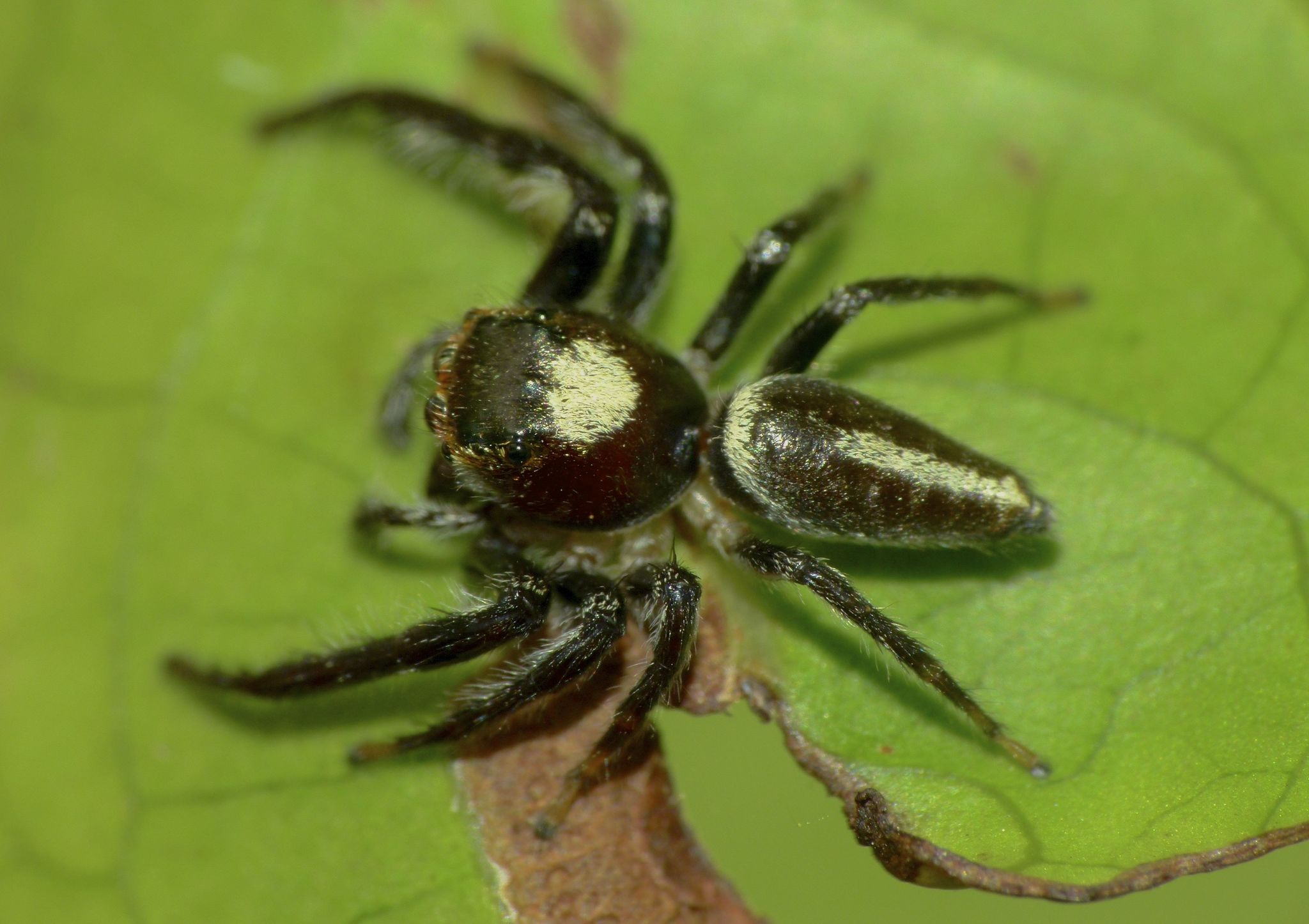
- Male Opisthoncus mordax
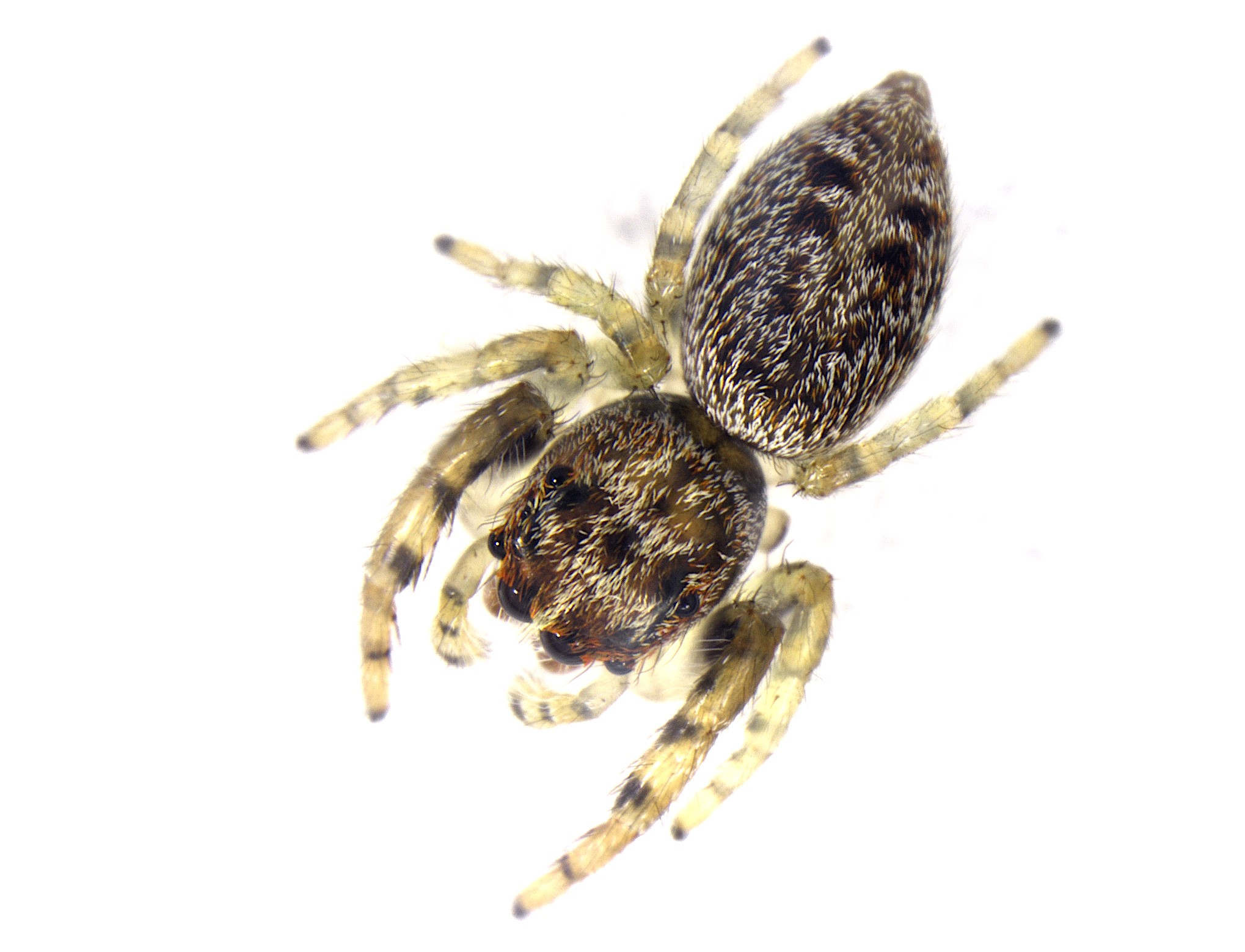
- Dorsal view of Opisthoncus polyphemus

Scientific classification
- Kingdom: Animalia
- Phylum: Arthropoda
- Subphylum: Chelicerata
- Class: Arachnida
- Order: Araneae
- Infraorder: Araneomorphae
- Family: Salticidae
- Subfamily: Salticinae
- Genus: Opisthoncus; L. Koch, 1880

Type species
- O. polyphemus (L. Koch, 1867)

Species
- 32, see text

= Opisthoncus =

Genus of spiders

Opisthoncus is a genus of South Pacific jumping spiders that was first described by Ludwig Carl Christian Koch in 1880. There are still many Australian species that have not yet been described.

== Species ==
As of August 2019 it contains thirty-two species, found only in Papua New Guinea and Australia:

- Opisthoncus abnormis L. Koch, 1881 – Australia (Queensland, New South Wales)
- Opisthoncus albiventris L. Koch, 1881 – Australia (New South Wales)
- Opisthoncus alborufescens L. Koch, 1880 – Australia (Queensland, New South Wales)
- Opisthoncus barbipalpis (Keyserling, 1882) – Australia (Queensland)
- Opisthoncus bellus (Karsch, 1878) – Australia (New South Wales)
- Opisthoncus bitaeniatus L. Koch, 1880 – Australia (Queensland, New South Wales)
- Opisthoncus confinis L. Koch, 1881 – Australia (Queensland)
- Opisthoncus delectabilis Rainbow, 1920 – Australia (Lord Howe Is.)
- Opisthoncus devexus Simon, 1909 – Australia (Western Australia)
- Opisthoncus eriognathus (Thorell, 1881) – New Guinea
- Opisthoncus grassator Keyserling, 1883 – Australia (Queensland)
- Opisthoncus inconspicuus (Thorell, 1881) – New Guinea
- Opisthoncus keyserlingi Zabka, 1991 – Australia (New South Wales)
- Opisthoncus kochi Zabka, 1991 – Australia (New South Wales)
- Opisthoncus lineativentris L. Koch, 1880 – Australia (Queensland, New South Wales)
- Opisthoncus machaerodus Simon, 1909 – Australia (Western Australia)
- Opisthoncus magnidens L. Koch, 1880 – Australia (Queensland, New South Wales)
- Opisthoncus mandibularis L. Koch, 1880 – Australia (New South Wales)
- Opisthoncus mordax L. Koch, 1880 – Australia (New South Wales)
- Opisthoncus necator L. Koch, 1881 – New Guinea, Australia (Queensland, New South Wales)
- Opisthoncus nigrifemur Strand, 1911 – Papua New Guinea (New Britain)
- Opisthoncus nigrofemoratus (L. Koch, 1867) – Australia (Queensland)
- Opisthoncus pallidulus L. Koch, 1880 – Australia (New South Wales)
- Opisthoncus parcedentatus L. Koch, 1880 – Australia (Queensland, New South Wales)
- Opisthoncus polyphemus (L. Koch, 1867) (type) – New Guinea, Australia (Queensland, New South Wales). Introduced to New Zealand
- Opisthoncus quadratarius (L. Koch, 1867) – Australia (Queensland)
- Opisthoncus rubriceps (Thorell, 1881) – Australia (Queensland)
- Opisthoncus serratofasciatus L. Koch, 1881 – Australia (New South Wales)
- Opisthoncus sexmaculatus (C. L. Koch, 1846) – Australia (New South Wales)
- Opisthoncus tenuipes (Keyserling, 1882) – Australia (Queensland)
- Opisthoncus unicolor L. Koch, 1881 – Australia (Queensland)
- Opisthoncus versimilis Peckham & Peckham, 1901 – Australia (Victoria)
