= Maelstrom gene =

Protein-coding gene in the species Drosophila melanogaster

Maelstrom

Identifiers
- Organism: Drosophila melanogaster
- Symbol: Mael
- Orthologs: OMA: entry
- UniProt: Q9VNS0
Search for
- Structures: Swiss-model
- Domains: InterPro

The gene Maelstrom, Mael, creates a protein, which was first located in Drosophila melanogaster in the nuage perinuclear structure and has functionality analogous to the spindle, spn, gene class. Its mammalian homolog is MAEL.

== In Drosophila ==
Maelstrom helps establish anterior-posterior and dorsal-ventral symmetry by coordinating to the Microtubule-Organizing Center (MTOC) and assists Vasa establish a concentration gradient of Bicaudal D (BicD) in the developing Drosophila oocyte. Similar to other spindle-class genes, maelstrom defects can lead to the failed production of a karyosome. Mael has also been shown to repress microRNA-7 (miR-7), which in turn regulates the Bag-of-marbles (BAM) protein and secures correct germline differentiation.

Short RNAs are well-known to silence TEs (transposable elements) through the RNAi (RNA interference) pathway, and Piwi-associated RNAs (piRNAs) play a crucial role in transposon silencing in the germline. The Maelstrom protein forms a complex with piRISC to silence transposons and therefore stabilize the germline cell genome.

== In mammals ==
A knockout model for MAEL, the mammalian homolog of Drosophila’s Maelstrom, was created by homologous recombination in mice to create Mael null mice. In the knockout mice, meiotic chromosome synapsis is defective. In addition, spermatogenesis fails due to sperm DNA damage caused by the derepression of transposable elements.

MAEL has also recently been associated with human cancer. An experiment showed MAEL expression throughout a majority of cancer cell types, including lung cancer, breast cancer, prostate cancer, and colon cancer and in turn suggests MAEL as a constituent of the cancer/testis gene class.
