= MAP4K4 =

Protein-coding gene in the species Homo sapiens

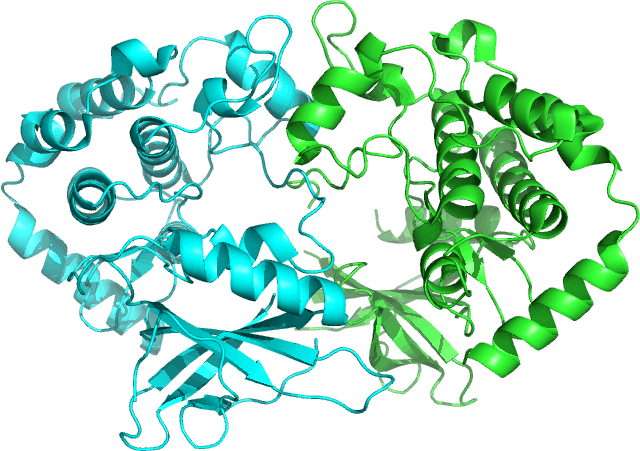

Identifiers
- Aliases: MAP4K4, FLH21957, HEL-S-31, HGK, MEKKK4, NIK, mitogen-activated protein kinase kinase kinase kinase 4
- External IDs: OMIM: 604666; MGI: 1349394; GeneCards: MAP4K4
Available structures
PDB	Ortholog search: PDBe RCSB
PDB	List of PDB id codes 4OBO, 4OBP, 4OBQ, 4RVT, 4U43, 4U44, 4U45, 4ZK5, 4U42, 5DI1, 4U3Y, 4U3Z, 4U41, 4U40
Enzyme activity
EC #	BRENDA	ExPASy	KEGG	MetaCyc
2.7.11.1	↗	↗	↗	↗

Gene location (Human)
Chr.	Chromosome 2 (human)
Band	2q11.2	Start	101,696,850 bp
Band	2q11.2	End	101,894,689 bp

Gene location (Mouse)
Chr.	Chromosome 1 (mouse)
Band	1|1 B	Start	39,900,913 bp
Band	1|1 B	End	40,026,310 bp
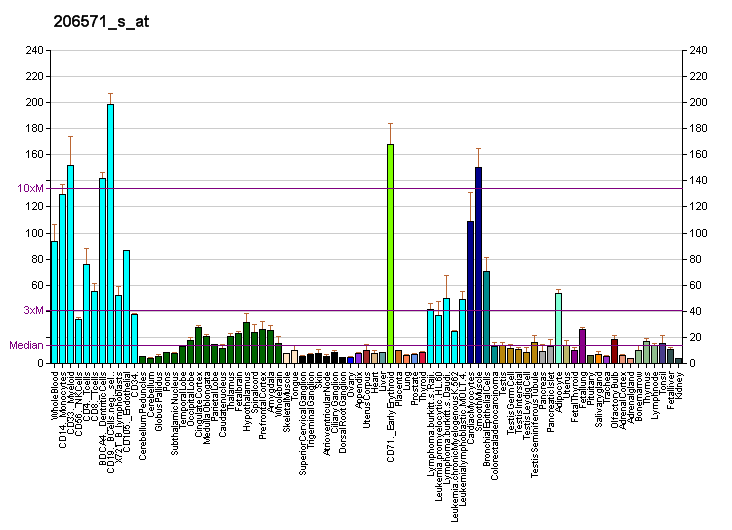

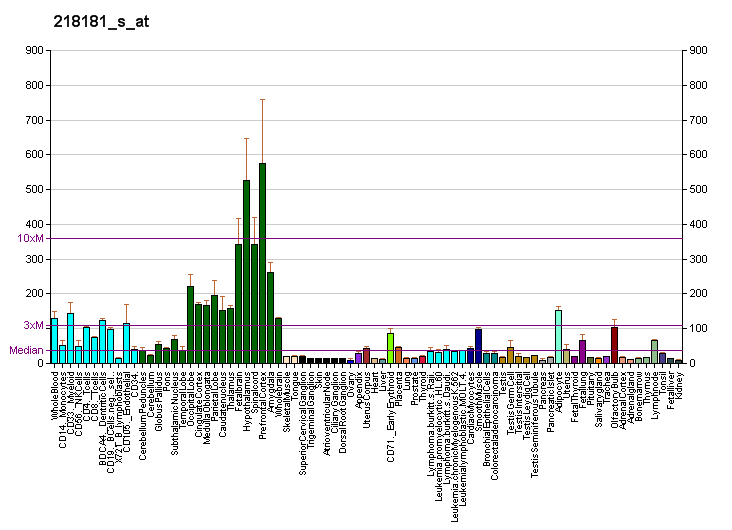
RNA expression pattern
Bgee	Human / Mouse (ortholog); Top expressed in: C1 segment; ganglionic eminence; corpus callosum; internal globus pallidus; dorsal motor nucleus of vagus nerve; sural nerve; inferior olivary nucleus; ventricular zone; external globus pallidus; amygdala / Top expressed in: ventricular zone; ganglionic eminence; tail of embryo; genital tubercle; granulocyte; sciatic nerve; utricle; superior cervical ganglion; Rostral migratory stream; otic vesicle; More reference expression data
BioGPS	More reference expression data
Gene ontology
Molecular function	transferase activity; creatine kinase activity; protein serine/threonine kinase activity; nucleotide binding; protein kinase activity; protein binding; ATP binding; kinase activity; MAP kinase kinase kinase kinase activity; microtubule binding
Cellular component	cytoplasm; focal adhesion
Biological process	protein phosphorylation; regulation of JNK cascade; intracellular signal transduction; negative regulation of apoptotic process; microvillus assembly; phosphorylation; MAPK cascade; regulation of mitotic cell cycle; neuron projection morphogenesis; negative regulation of neuron projection development; negative regulation of insulin secretion involved in cellular response to glucose stimulus; negative regulation of neuron projection regeneration; negative regulation of cell-matrix adhesion; signal transduction; positive regulation of cell migration; stress-activated protein kinase signaling cascade; positive regulation of ARF protein signal transduction; activation of protein kinase activity; positive regulation of GTPase activity; positive regulation of keratinocyte migration; positive regulation of focal adhesion assembly; positive regulation of adherens junction organization
Sources:Amigo / QuickGO
Orthologs
Databases	NCBI: entry; OMA: entry
Species	Human	Mouse
Entrez	9448	26921
Ensembl	ENSG00000071054	ENSMUSG00000026074
UniProt	O95819	P97820
RefSeq (mRNA)	NM_001242559; NM_001242560; NM_004834; NM_145686; NM_145687	NM_001252200; NM_001252201; NM_001252202; NM_008696
RefSeq (protein)	NP_001229488; NP_001229489; NP_004825; NP_663719; NP_663720	NP_001239129; NP_001239130; NP_001239131; NP_032722
Location (UCSC)	Chr 2: 101.7 – 101.89 Mb	Chr 1: 39.9 – 40.03 Mb
PubMed search
- Wikidata
View/Edit Human	View/Edit Mouse

Mitogen-activated protein kinase kinase kinase kinase 4 (MAP4K4) – also known as hepatocyte progenitor kinase-like/germinal center kinase-like kinase (HGK) and Nck-interacting kinase (NIK) – is an enzyme, specifically a serine/threonine (S/T) kinase encoded by the MAP4K4 gene in humans.

MAP4K4 is involved in a wide array of physiological processes including cell migration, proliferation and adhesion; its activity has been implicated in systemic inflammation, metabolic disorders, cardiovascular disease and cancer.

While MAP4K4 has been found to be upregulated in a wide array of cancers, there is currently limited information regarding its specific involvement. However, there is increasing evidence that suggests MAP4K4 has an important role in the development and progression of cancer, and may serve as a novel target for cancer therapeutics.

== Discovery and classification ==
MAP4K4 is categorized under the mammalian sterile 20 protein (Ste20p) kinase family due to its shared homology with the Ste20p kinase found in budding yeast and is a member of the GCK-IV subfamily. Mammalian MAP4K4 was initially identified in mice as a kinase activator for a protein called Nck followed shortly by identification and cloning of the human orthologue encoded by the MAP4K4 gene.

== Gene ==
In humans, MAP4K4 is encoded by the MAP4K4 gene located on chromosome 2, position q11.2 and consists of 33 exons responsible for its synthesis.

== Tissue distribution ==
To date, MAP4K4 has been found to be expressed in all tissue types with a relatively more pronounced expression in the brain and testes. Multiple isoforms of MAP4K4 can be present at any given time in the same cell but the abundance of each isoform in the cell differs depending on the cell-type or tissue-type.

- E.g. In humans, the shorter isoform of MAP4K4 is predominantly expressed in organs including the liver, placenta, skeletal muscles while a longer isoform is expressed in the brain

== Structure ==
It contains approximately 1200 amino acids, has a molecular mass of ~140 KDa.

Structurally MAP4K4 contains the following domains:

- N-Terminal Kinase Domain
- Coiled-coil domain
- C-Terminal Hydrophobic Leucine-Rich Citron Homology Domain (CNH)
- Interdomain - Connects the kinase and CNH domains, facilitates protein-protein interactions. Although it has been identified, its structural components and functionality are currently poorly understood

Figure 1. Schematic representation of MAP4K4 structure, depicts the N-terminal kinase domain, C-terminal citron homology domain (regulatory function) and the interdomain (facilitates protein interactions). Note: the numbers indicate amino acid positions.

Alternative splicing of the MAP4K4 gene yields five functional isoforms, all of which display fully homologous kinase and CNH domains but differences in the interdomain domain. While the biological significance of these isoforms remains to be determined, it can be speculated that such variations alter and determine MAP4K4's interactions with other proteins and factors, ultimately leading to the activation/inhibition of different biochemical and physiological cascades.

The mammalian class of Ste20 kinases require phosphorylation at specific sites for full activity. Primary phosphorylation at the activation site in their kinase domain is believed to cause a conformational change in the protein, stabilizing the structure of its activation segment to allow suitable substrate binding. Secondary sites also require phosphorylation for the enzyme to assume full activation and is achieved via autophosphorylation or by upstream kinases.

== Interactions and signaling ==
=== TNF-α ===
Evidence from mammalian and fly studies indicate that MAP4K4 is involved with tumour necrosis factor alpha (TNF-α) and its c-jun N-terminal kinase (JNK) signaling pathway. MAP4K4 not only mediates TNF-α signaling but also promotes its expression; moreover, TNF-α can elevate MAP4K4 expression using transcription factors

The JNK pathway is implicated in a number of physiological processes and involves JNKs – kinases responsible for the phosphorylation of a downstream protein called c-Jun. This further leads to the increase in expression and activity of specific transcription factors that respond to a variety of cellular stressors, growth factors and cytokines. The activation of the JNK signal transduction pathway by MAP4K4 has been implicated in apoptotic regulation of many different cell types, tumorigenesis and/or inflammation.

=== p53 ===
p53 is a tumour suppressor gene and is involved with cellular response to stress. When expressed, the cell cycle is halted in the G1 phase and can induce senescence or apoptosis. Mutations to the p53 gene are often found in many types of cancers.

The MAP4K4 gene contains four binding sites for p53. Upon binding, p53 up-regulates MAP4K4 expression leading to the activation of the JNK signaling pathway. siRNA knockdown experiments have also shown a reduction of p53 induced apoptosis. Current evidence therefore suggests that MAP4K4 has a modulating effect on p53 induced apoptosis in the JNK signaling pathway.

== Clinical significance ==
=== Glucose uptake and insulin function ===
MAP4K4 has been identified to be involved in the negative regulation of insulin-dependent glucose transport. There is increasing evidence suggesting cytokines such as TNF-α mediate biological effects antagonistic to insulin action and induce inflammation observed in obesity. TNF-α specifically attenuates the signaling pathway initiated by insulin receptors, reducing the amount of glucose transport and uptake; and it is believed that MAP4K4 functions as an upstream signaling element in the TNF-α signaling cascade.

A recent siRNA screen identified the involvement of MAP4K4 in the regulation of the glucose transporter GLUT4. The silencing of MAP4K4 in adipocytes elevated the expression of peroxisome proliferator-activated receptor y (PPARy) – a nuclear hormone receptor responsible for the regulation of genes associated with adipocyte differentiation, including GLUT4. siRNA silencing of MAP4K4 appears to prevent insulin resistance, restoring insulin sensitivity in human skeletal muscles by down-regulating the TNF-α signaling cascade and inhibits the TNF-α-induced depletion of PPARy and GLUT4. Additionally, miRNA silencing of MAP4K4 in pancreatic beta-cells conferred protection against TNF-α repression of insulin transcription and secretion, further confirming that MAP4K4 targeting is a potential strategy for diabetes prevention and treatment.

=== Atherosclerosis ===
Atherosclerosis is the result of an inflammatory response to lipid-mediated vascular damage. It has been identified that cytokines such as TNF-α induce the expression of pro-inflammatory genes to synthesize leukocyte adhesion molecules and chemokines. Endothelial cells highly express MAP4K4 and recent studies have reported that MAP4K4 enhances endothelial permeability. This consequently contributes to the development of atherosclerosis due to the promotion of leukocyte extravasation, transport of oxidized lipids and the formation of plaques.

Silencing of endothelial MAP4K4 ameliorated the development of atherosclerosis in mice. Additionally, treatment of a MAP4K4 protein kinase inhibitor in mice significantly reduced plaque progression and promoted plaque regression suggesting therapeutic targeting of MAP4K4 may be a beneficial strategy for cardiovascular disease.

=== Cancer ===
The biggest causes of death for patients with cancer are tumour invasion and metastasis – processes that are highly correlated with cell migration and motility. There is limited information regarding how MAP4K4 is involved in cancer but studies have shown that MAP4K4 is overexpressed in a number of cancer types including lung, prostate, pancreatic and ovarian cancer where such up-regulation is associated with increased cell migration, adhesion and invasiveness.

Several studies have identified MAP4K4 as an upstream regulator of proteins associated with cytoskeletal dynamics or adhesion. Deletion of the MAP4K4 gene appears to affect membrane dynamics in endothelial cells, resulting in reduced cell migration and impaired angiogenesis; while an overexpression significantly elevates the rate of cell invasion and morphogenesis.

Evidence also indicates that MAP4K4 is a major contributor to the elevated growth and migratory properties of tumour cells. Poor prognosis and clinical progression of hepatocellular carcinoma, pancreatic adenocarcinoma, and colorectal cancer are all closely correlated with MAP4K4 expression levels.
