= Methuselah-like proteins =

Found in insects that play a role in aging and reproduction

Methuselah N-terminus
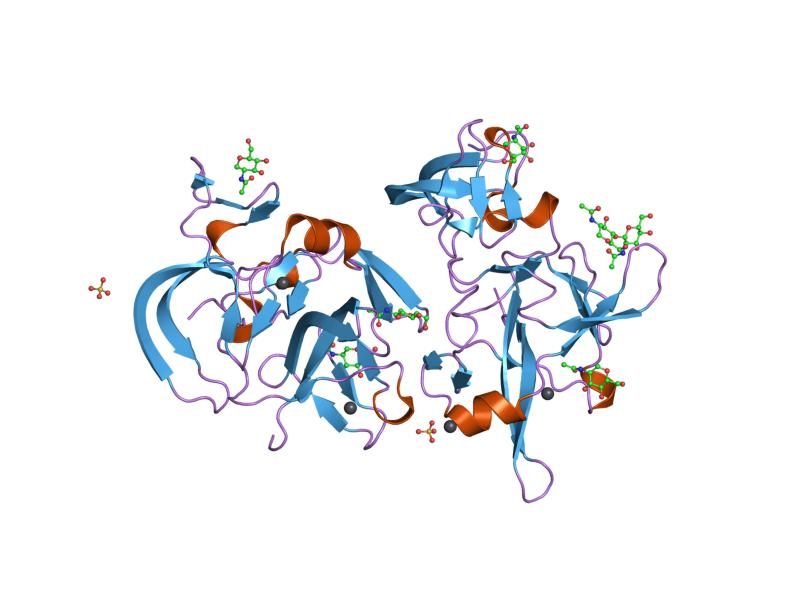
- Structure of the ectodomain of Methuselah, a Drosophila G protein-coupled receptor associated with extended lifespan

Identifiers
- Symbol: Methuselah_N
- Pfam: PF06652
- InterPro: IPR010596
- SCOP2: 1fjr / SCOPe / SUPFAM
Available protein structures:
- PDB: 1fjr IPR010596 PF06652 (ECOD; PDBsum)
- AlphaFold: IPR010596; PF06652

The Methuselah-like proteins are a family of G protein-coupled receptors found in insects that play a role in aging and reproduction. Antagonizing these receptors can extend the life span of the animal and make it more resistant to free radicals and starvation, but also reduce reproduction and increase cold sensitivity. The age dependent decline in olfaction and motor function is unaffected.

Methuselah-like proteins are related to G protein-coupled receptors of the secretin receptor family.
