= Fringe gene =

Fringe

Identifiers
- Symbol: FNG
- InterPro: IPR017374
- Membranome: 1299

Fringe genes are important in the workings of the notch signaling pathway.

In Drosophila melanogaster (the fruit fly) the fringe gene (fng) was identified as part of the notch mechanism by Dr. Kenneth Irvine at the Waksman Institute at Rutgers. Later based on similarity, the manic fringe (MFNG), the radical fringe (RFNG) and lunatic fringe (LFNG) genes were identified in mammals.

Fringe genes encode O-fucose specific β-1,3-N-Acetylglucosaminyltransferases (GlcNAcT) glycosyltransferases.

The gene products of radical fringe stimulate the Apical Ectodermal Ridge in limb-bud formation.

The mouse and human Fringe family members map to three different chromosomes:

- Mfng maps to mouse Chr 15 and to human Chr 22.
- Lfng maps to mouse Chr 5 and human Chr 7.
- Rfng maps to mouse Chr 11 and human Chr 17.
