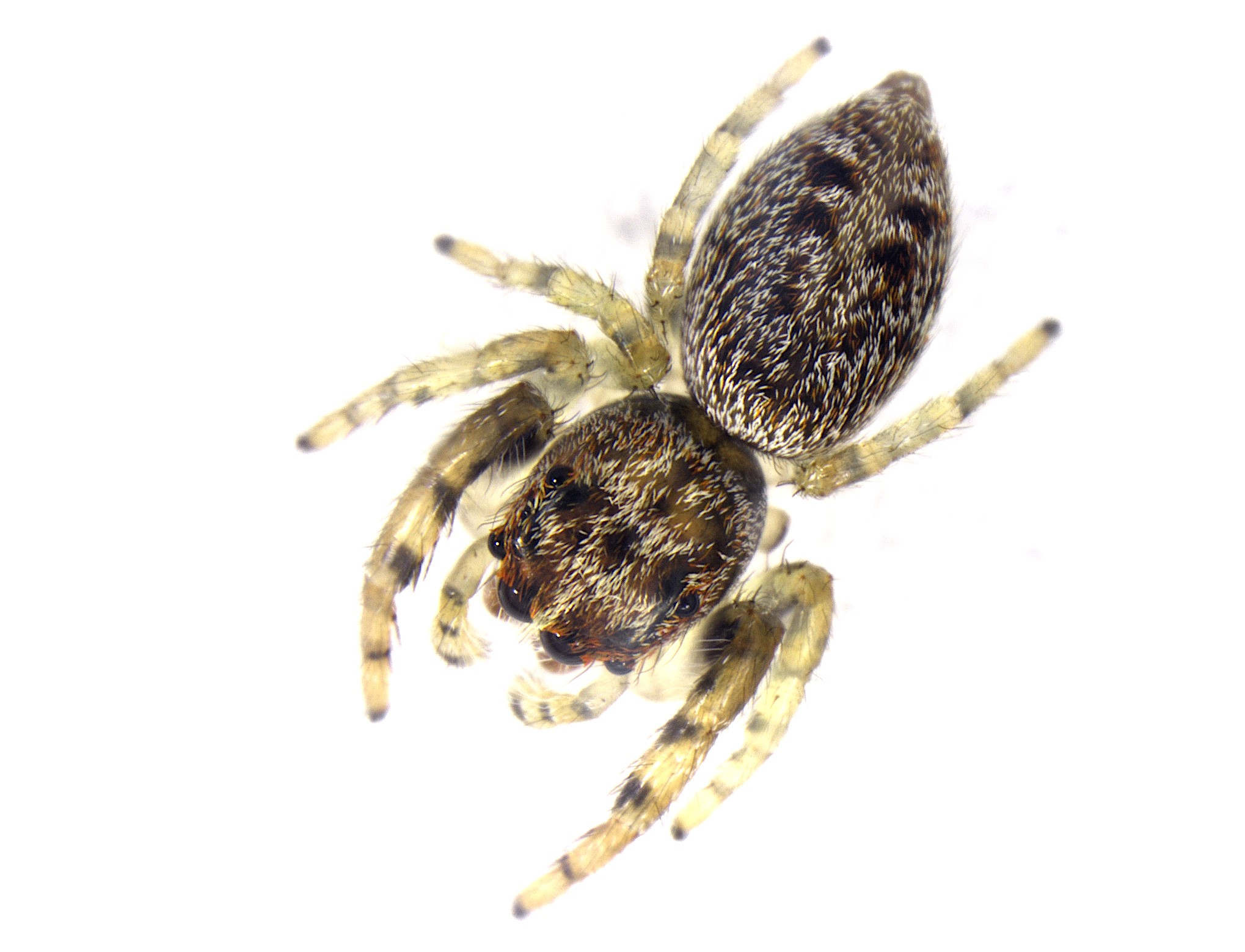

Scientific classification
- Kingdom: Animalia
- Phylum: Arthropoda
- Subphylum: Chelicerata
- Class: Arachnida
- Order: Araneae
- Infraorder: Araneomorphae
- Family: Salticidae
- Genus: Opisthoncus
- Species: O. polyphemus

Binomial name
- Opisthoncus polyphemus L. Koch, 1867

= Opisthoncus polyphemus =

Species of spider

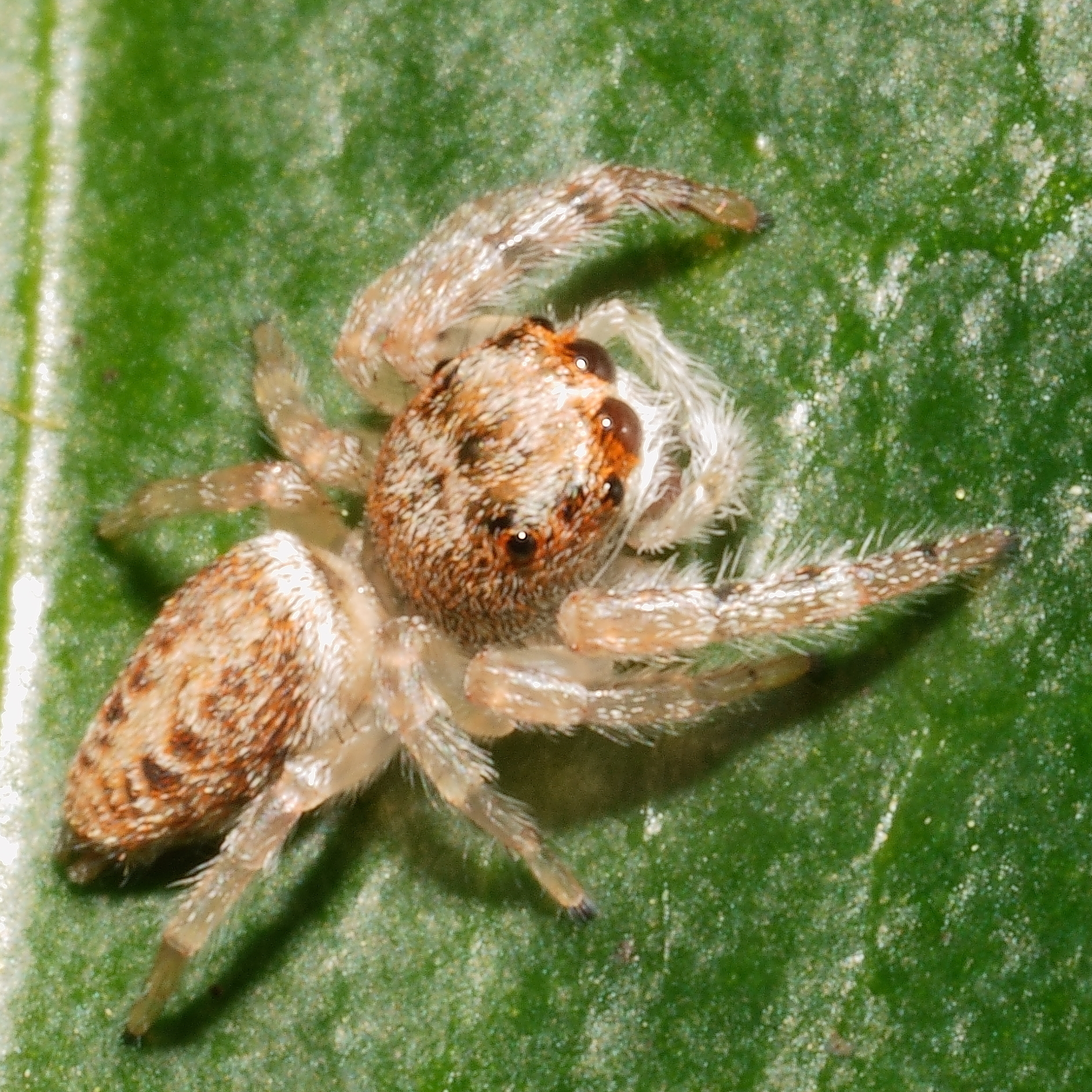
O. polyphemus in New Zealand

Opisthoncus polyphemus, also called the cyclops jumping spider, is a species of jumping spiders in the family Salticidae. It is found in New Guinea, Australia and New Zealand.

The males are 6–7 mm (0.24–0.28 in) in length with the females slightly larger at 8-9mm, both with pale yellow-orange bodies with white markings. Its black eyes are made to look bigger by surrounding black circles giving rise to the polyphemus and Cyclops names.

== Taxonomy ==
The species was described in 1867 by L. Koch as Attus polyphemus (by 1875 the author refers to it as in the genus Opisthoncus).
