= MAP4K3 =

Protein-coding gene in the species Homo sapiens

Identifiers
- Aliases: MAP4K3, GLK, MAPKKKK3, MEKKK 3, MEKKK3, RAB8IPL1, mitogen-activated protein kinase kinase kinase kinase 3
- External IDs: OMIM: 604921; MGI: 2154405; GeneCards: MAP4K3
Enzyme activity
EC #	BRENDA	ExPASy	KEGG	MetaCyc
2.7.11.1	↗	↗	↗	↗

Gene location (Human)
Chr.	Chromosome 2 (human)
Band	2p22.1	Start	39,249,266 bp
Band	2p22.1	End	39,437,301 bp

Gene location (Mouse)
Chr.	Chromosome 17 (mouse)
Band	17|17 E3	Start	80,580,512 bp
Band	17|17 E3	End	80,728,485 bp
RNA expression pattern
Bgee	Human / Mouse (ortholog); Top expressed in: secondary oocyte; Achilles tendon; sural nerve; Skeletal muscle tissue of rectus abdominis; tibia; epithelium of colon; gastrocnemius muscle; biceps brachii; endometrium; jejunum / Top expressed in: vestibular membrane of cochlear duct; epithelium of lens; Paneth cell; left lung lobe; retina; calvaria; Region I of hippocampus proper; fossa; vestibular sensory epithelium; cingulate gyrus; More reference expression data
BioGPS	n/a
Gene ontology
Molecular function	transferase activity; protein kinase activity; protein serine/threonine kinase activity; nucleotide binding; protein binding; ATP binding; kinase activity; MAP kinase kinase kinase kinase activity
Cellular component	cytoplasm
Biological process	response to tumor necrosis factor; protein phosphorylation; JNK cascade; intracellular signal transduction; response to UV; phosphorylation; regulation of mitotic cell cycle; regulation of apoptotic process; signal transduction; stress-activated protein kinase signaling cascade; activation of protein kinase activity
Sources:Amigo / QuickGO
Orthologs
Databases	NCBI: entry; OMA: entry
Species	Human	Mouse
Entrez	8491	225028
Ensembl	ENSG00000011566	ENSMUSG00000024242
UniProt	Q8IVH8	Q99JP0
RefSeq (mRNA)	NM_001270425; NM_003618	NM_001081357; NM_001290345; NM_001360278
RefSeq (protein)	NP_001257354; NP_003609	NP_001277274; NP_001347207
Location (UCSC)	Chr 2: 39.25 – 39.44 Mb	Chr 17: 80.58 – 80.73 Mb
PubMed search
- Wikidata
View/Edit Human	View/Edit Mouse

Mitogen-activated protein kinase kinase kinase kinase 3 is a protein that in humans is encoded by the MAP4K3 gene.

== Function ==
This gene encodes a member of the mitogen-activated protein kinase kinase kinase kinase family. The encoded protein activates key effectors in cell signalling, among them c-Jun. Alternatively spliced transcripts encoding multiple isoforms have been observed for this gene.
