= Ameronothridae =

Scientific classification
- Kingdom: Animalia
- Phylum: Arthropoda
- Subphylum: Chelicerata
- Class: Arachnida
- Order: Oribatida
- Superfamily: Ameronothroidea
- Family: Ameronothridae; Willmann, 1931

Family of mites

Ameronothridae is a family of oribatids in the order Oribatida. There are about 8 genera and at least 30 described species in Ameronothridae.

== Genera ==
- Alaskozetes Hammer, 1955
- Ameronothrus Berlese, 1896
- Aquanothrus Engelbrecht, 1975
- Capillibates Hammer, 1966
- Chudalupia Wallwork, 1981
- Halozetes Berlese, 1916
- Podacarus Grandjean, 1955
- Pseudantarcticola Balogh, 1970
