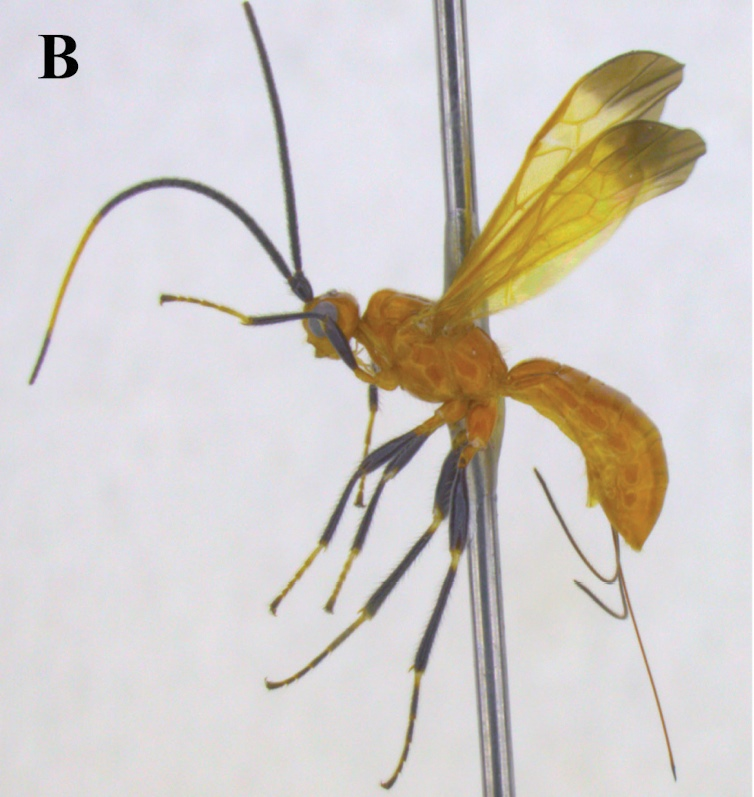
- Heerz ecmhala

Scientific classification
- Kingdom: Animalia
- Phylum: Arthropoda
- Class: Insecta
- Order: Hymenoptera
- Family: Braconidae
- Subfamily: Doryctinae
- Genus: Heerz; Marsh, 1993

= Heerz =

Genus of wasps

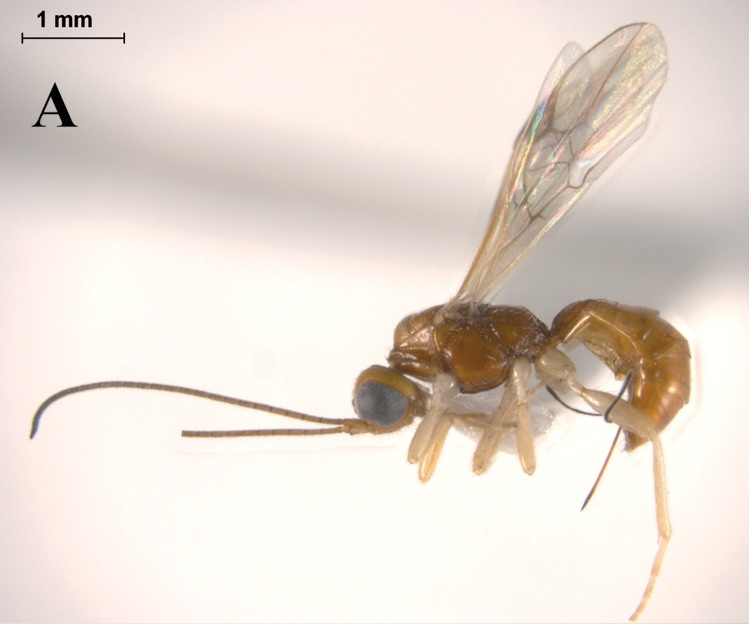
Heerz macrophthalma

Heerz is a genus of wasp in the family Braconidae. There are at least four described species in Heerz, found in Mexico and Central America.

== Species ==
These four species belong to the genus Heerz:

- Heerz ecmahla Martínez, Zaldívar-Riverón, Ceccarelli & Shaw, 2012
- Heerz lukenatcha Marsh, 1993
- Heerz macrophthalma Martínez, Zaldívar-Riverón, Ceccarelli & Shaw, 2012
- Heerz tooya Marsh, 1993
