= Colon rectum =

Scientific classification
- Kingdom: Animalia
- Phylum: Arthropoda
- Clade: Pancrustacea
- Class: Insecta
- Order: Coleoptera
- Suborder: Polyphaga
- Infraorder: Staphyliniformia
- Family: Leiodidae
- Genus: Colon
- Species: C. rectum

Binomial name
- Colon rectum Hatch, 1933

Species of beetle

Colon rectum is a species of beetle in the genus Colon. It lives in Canada and around the Great Lakes. It is a member of the round fungus beetles (family Leiodidae).
