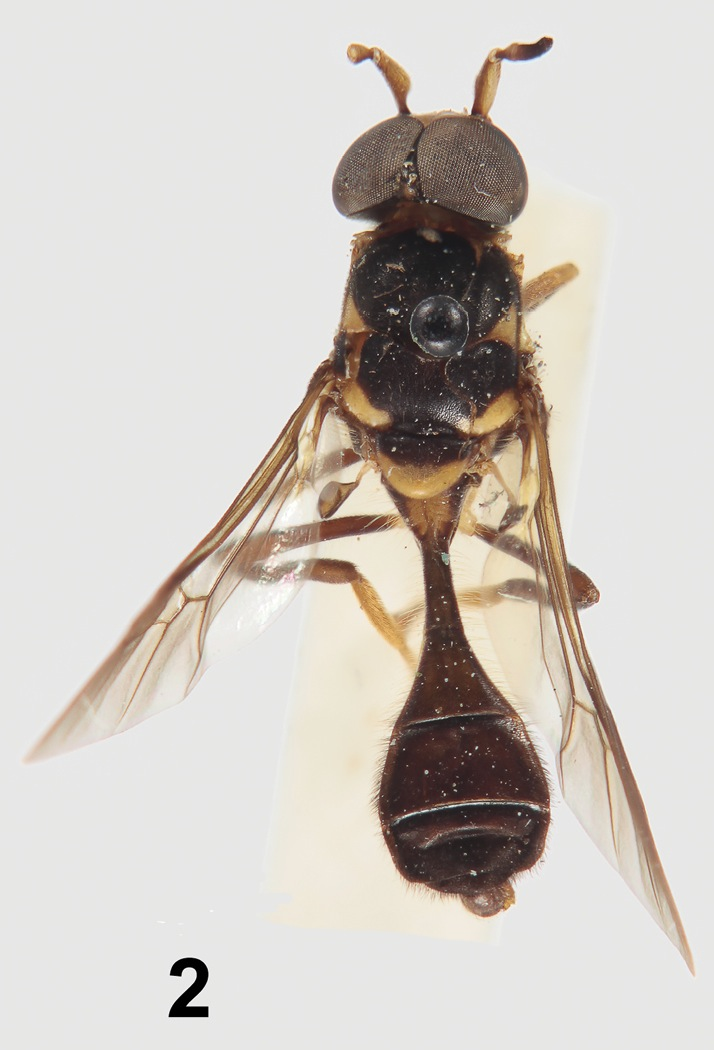

Scientific classification
- Kingdom: Animalia
- Phylum: Arthropoda
- Clade: Pancrustacea
- Class: Insecta
- Order: Diptera
- Family: Stratiomyidae
- Subfamily: Pachygastrinae
- Genus: Parastratiosphecomyia
- Species: P. stratiosphecomyioides

Binomial name
- Parastratiosphecomyia stratiosphecomyioides Brunetti, 1923

= Parastratiosphecomyia stratiosphecomyioides =

Species of fly

Parastratiosphecomyia stratiosphecomyioides is a species of fly in the family Stratiomyidae. It is native to Thailand (Pattani province) and other countries, including China, Laos and Malaysia. Its genus name comes from Ancient Greek, meaning "Near soldier wasp-fly", with its specific epithet meaning "wasp fly-like". It is considered to be the animal with the longest valid scientific name today. The name Gammaracanthuskytodermogammarus loricatobaicalensis, an amphipod described in 1926 by Benedykt Dybowski, was longer, but was suppressed and is no longer valid, and the bacterium Myxococcus llanfairpwllgwyngyllgogerychwyrndrobwllllantysiliogogogochensis has the longest name of any organism, but it is not an animal. P. stratiosphecomyioides, sometimes referred to as the Southeast Asian soldier fly, was described in 1923 by British entomologist Enrico Brunetti. This insect’s length is usually between 10.3 and 10.4 mm.

== Markings and coloration ==
Given its wasp-like appearance, P. stratiosphecomyioides might exhibit Batesian mimicry, which could reduce its frequency of being eaten by predators.

== See also ==
- List of long species names
