= MFNG =

Protein-coding gene in the species Homo sapiens

Identifiers
- Aliases: MFNG, MFNG O-fucosylpeptide 3-beta-N-acetylglucosaminyltransferase
- External IDs: OMIM: 602577; MGI: 1095404; GeneCards: MFNG
Available structures
PDB	Ortholog search: PDBe RCSB
PDB	List of PDB id codes 2J0A, 2J0B
Enzyme activity
EC #	BRENDA	ExPASy	KEGG	MetaCyc
2.4.1.222	↗	↗	↗	↗

Gene location (Human)
Chr.	Chromosome 22 (human)
Band	22q13.1	Start	37,469,063 bp
Band	22q13.1	End	37,486,393 bp

Gene location (Mouse)
Chr.	Chromosome 15 (mouse)
Band	15 E1|15 37.69 cM	Start	78,640,082 bp
Band	15 E1|15 37.69 cM	End	78,657,675 bp
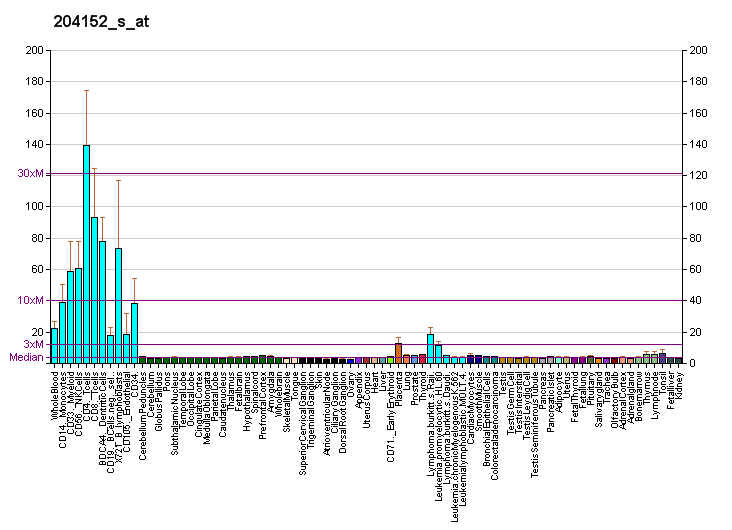

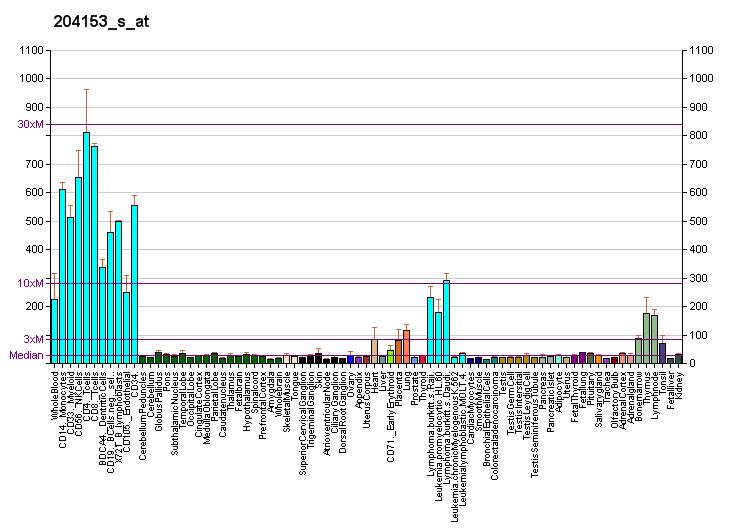
RNA expression pattern
Bgee	Human / Mouse (ortholog); Top expressed in: granulocyte; monocyte; blood; lymph node; spleen; appendix; apex of heart; bone marrow cell; right lung; upper lobe of left lung / Top expressed in: ventricular zone; medial ganglionic eminence; subcutaneous adipose tissue; Rostral migratory stream; white adipose tissue; mesenteric lymph nodes; lactiferous gland; thymus; spleen; tunica adventitia of aorta; More reference expression data
BioGPS	More reference expression data
Gene ontology
Molecular function	transferase activity; O-fucosylpeptide 3-beta-N-acetylglucosaminyltransferase activity; metal ion binding; glycosyltransferase activity; acetylglucosaminyltransferase activity
Cellular component	integral component of membrane; integral component of Golgi membrane; Golgi membrane; Golgi apparatus; membrane; extracellular space
Biological process	pattern specification process; multicellular organism development; positive regulation of protein binding; marginal zone B cell differentiation; positive regulation of Notch signaling pathway; regulation of Notch signaling pathway; protein O-linked fucosylation; blastocyst formation
Sources:Amigo / QuickGO
Orthologs
Databases	NCBI: entry; OMA: entry
Species	Human	Mouse
Entrez	4242	17305
Ensembl	ENSG00000100060	ENSMUSG00000018169
UniProt	O00587	O09008
RefSeq (mRNA)	NM_001166343; NM_002405	NM_008595
RefSeq (protein)	NP_001159815; NP_002396	NP_032621
Location (UCSC)	Chr 22: 37.47 – 37.49 Mb	Chr 15: 78.64 – 78.66 Mb
PubMed search
- Wikidata
View/Edit Human	View/Edit Mouse

Beta-1,3-N-acetylglucosaminyltransferase manic fringe is an enzyme that in humans is encoded by the MFNG gene, a member of the fringe gene family which also includes the radical fringe (RFNG) and lunatic fringe (LFNG).

They all encode evolutionarily conserved proteins that act in the Notch receptor pathway to demarcate boundaries during embryonic development. While their genomic structure is distinct from other glycosyltransferases, fringe proteins have a fucose-specific beta1,3 N-acetylglucosaminyltransferase activity that leads to elongation of O-linked fucose residues on Notch, which alters Notch signaling.
