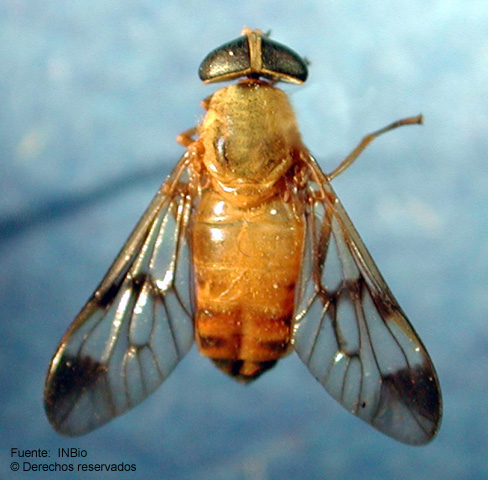

Scientific classification
- Kingdom: Animalia
- Phylum: Arthropoda
- Clade: Pancrustacea
- Class: Insecta
- Order: Diptera
- Family: Tabanidae
- Subfamily: Tabaninae
- Tribe: Diachlorini
- Genus: Diachlorus
- Species: D. ferrugatus

Binomial name
- Diachlorus ferrugatus (Fabricius, 1805)

Synonyms
- Chrysops ferrugatus Fabricius, 1805

= Diachlorus ferrugatus =

Species of insect

Diachlorus ferrugatus, commonly known as the yellow fly or yellow fly of the dismal swamp in the United States or doctor fly in Belize, is a species of highly aggressive biting horse-fly of the family Tabanidae native to North and Central America to Costa Rica.

== Taxonomy ==
The yellow fly was described as Chrysops ferrugatus by Johan Christian Fabricius in 1805.

== Description ==
Adult yellow flies are around 1 centimetre (0.39 in) long with yellow bodies, mid-legs, and hind-legs, and black fore-legs. The eyes are blue-green with purple bands. They fly with little sound, and the first sign of their presence noticed by humans is usually their bite.

The larvae are thin white grubs with fine yellow fur, each segment having three pairs of pseudopodia.

== Distribution and habitat ==
The yellow fly ranges from the southeastern United States, where it is found from New Jersey to Texas, to Costa Rica. It is most common near bodies of water, along with trees nearby to hide in. Spanish moss (Tillandsia usneoides) is a popular hiding spot.

== Effect on humans ==
It is notorious for its propensity to inflict painful bites on people, having been described as the most aggressive fly species in Florida. The female feeds on blood to develop eggs, and is most active in the summer and early autumn during daylight hours, especially in the late afternoon and on overcast days. Flies can even venture indoors. Its presence affects recreational swimming, boating, and fishing from April to June. Yellow fly bites leave itchy welts.

DEET is the most useful insect repellent, though may not prevent bites if the yellow flies are in large numbers. In this case, physical barriers such as gloves and headnets are the only truly effective protection.
