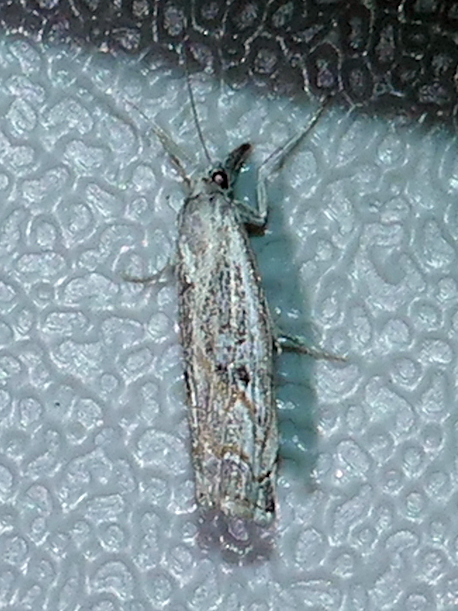

Scientific classification
- Kingdom: Animalia
- Phylum: Arthropoda
- Clade: Pancrustacea
- Class: Insecta
- Order: Lepidoptera
- Family: Crambidae
- Genus: La
- Species: L. cerveza

Binomial name
- La cerveza B. Landry, 1995

= La cerveza =

Species of moth

La cerveza is a species of moth in the family Crambidae. It was first described by Bernard Landry in 1995. It is found in the south-western US, where it has been recorded from Arizona, California, Colorado and Texas. Its binomial translates to "the beer" in Spanish. The genus contains several other puns.
