= Dichomeris nonstrigella =

Little devil

Scientific classification
- Kingdom: Animalia
- Phylum: Arthropoda
- Clade: Pancrustacea
- Class: Insecta
- Order: Lepidoptera
- Family: Gelechiidae
- Genus: Dichomeris
- Species: D. nonstrigella

Binomial name
- Dichomeris nonstrigella (Chambers, 1878)

Synonyms
- Dasycera nonstrigella Chambers, 1878

Species of moth

Dichomeris nonstrigella, the little devil, is a moth in the family Gelechiidae. It was described by Vactor Tousey Chambers in 1878. It is found in North America, where it has been recorded from Nova Scotia to Maryland, Michigan, Kansas, Arkansas and Kentucky.

The length of the forewings is 7–9 mm. Adults are on wing from May to July.

The larvae feed on Aster shortii.
