= Philonicus plebeius =

Scientific classification
- Domain: Eukaryota
- Kingdom: Animalia
- Phylum: Arthropoda
- Class: Insecta
- Order: Diptera
- Family: Asilidae
- Genus: Philonicus
- Species: P. plebeius

Binomial name
- Philonicus plebeius Osten Sacken

Species of fly

Philonicus plebeius is a species of robber flies in the family Asilidae.
