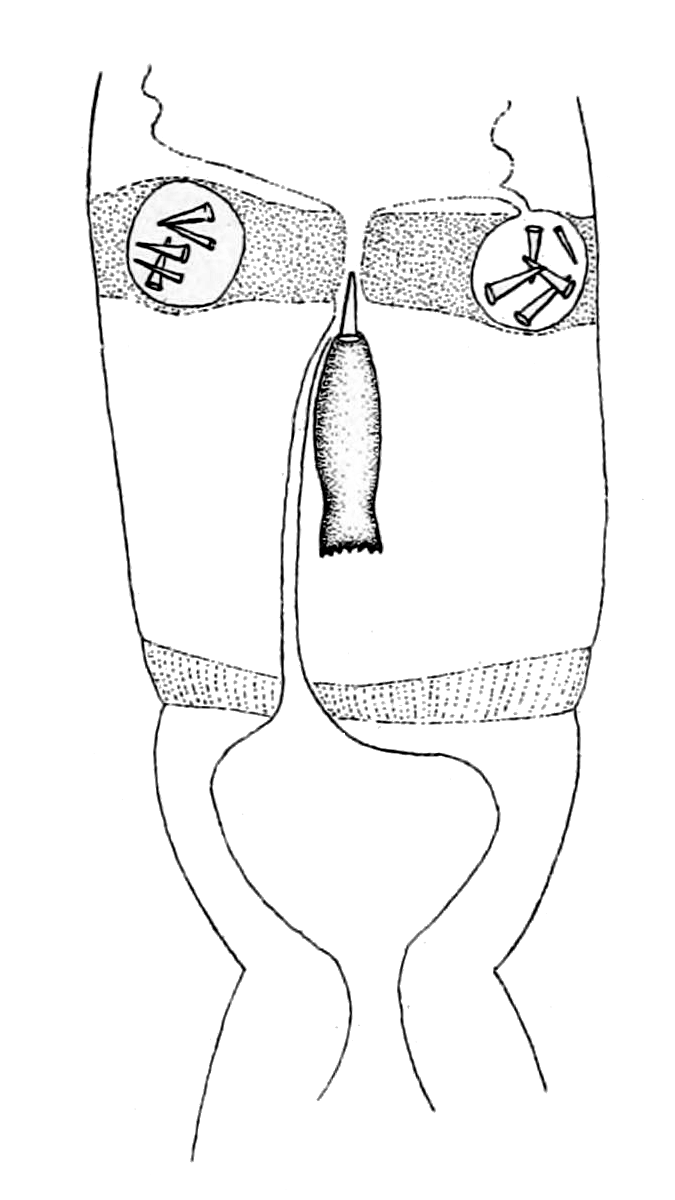
- Zygonemertes thalassina (Nemeretea: Enopla: Amphiporidae) from near Sitka. Outline of stylet apparatus of proboscis.

Scientific classification
- Kingdom: Animalia
- Phylum: Nemertea
- Class: Hoplonemertea
- Order: Monostilifera
- Family: Zygonemertidae
- Genus: Zygonemertes; Montgomery, 1897

= Zygonemertes =

Genus of worms

Zygonemertes is a genus of worms belonging to the family Zygonemertidae.

The species of this genus are found in North America.

Species:

- Zygonemertes africana Stiasny-Wijnhoff, 1916
- Zygonemertes albida Coe, 1901
- Zygonemertes algensis (Bürger, 1895)
- Zygonemertes capensis Wheeler, 1934
- Zygonemertes cocacola Corrêa, 1961
- Zygonemertes fragariae Corrêa, 1954
- Zygonemertes glandulosa Yamaoka, 1940
- Zygonemertes isabellae Corrêa, 1954
- Zygonemertes jamsteci Kajihara, 2002
- Zygonemertes luederitzi Stiasny-Wijnhoff, 1916
- Zygonemertes maslovskyi (Czerniavski, 1880)
- Zygonemertes shintai Kajihara, 2002
- Zygonemertes simoneae Corrêa, 1961
- Zygonemertes tenuirostris Korotkevich, 1977
- Zygonemertes thalassina Coe, 1901
- Zygonemertes virescens (Verrill, 1879)
- Zygonemertes wadjemupensis Gibson, 1999
- Zygonemertes zhenylebedevi Chernyshev, 1991
