= La cucaracha (moth) =

Scientific classification
- Domain: Eukaryota
- Kingdom: Animalia
- Phylum: Arthropoda
- Class: Insecta
- Order: Lepidoptera
- Family: Crambidae
- Genus: La
- Species: L. cucaracha

Binomial name
- La cucaracha Błeszyński, 1966

Synonyms
- La cucuracha Munroe, 1995

Species of moth

La cucaracha is a moth in the family Crambidae. It was described by Stanisław Błeszyński in 1966. It is found in Bolivia.
