= Tinman (gene) =

Muscle-specific homeobox protein tinman

Identifiers
- Organism: Drosophila melanogaster
- Symbol: tin
- UniProt: P22711
Search for
- Structures: Swiss-model
- Domains: InterPro

tinman, or tin is an Nk2-homeobox containing transcription factor first isolated in Drosophila flies. The human homolog is the Nkx2-5 gene. tinman is expressed in the precardiac mesoderm and is responsible for the differentiation, proliferation, and specification of cardiac progenitor cells. This gene is named after the character Tin Woodman who lacks a heart, as flies with nonfunctional tinman genes have cardiac deformities.

== Function and homologues ==
Homeobox genes are a group of transcription factors characterized by a homeodomain that initiates gene expression which regulates cell differentiation and development when it binds to a target promoter. tinman was first isolated in Drosophila and many vertebrate homologs have been discovered since and are considered part of a multigene family in vertebrates. The human homolog is Nkx2-5. This gene plays a role in patterning the heart, as well as in patterning and developing the mesoderm. Homologs of this gene found in vertebrates are expressed in the developing heart prior to differentiation.

tinman is dependent upon the JAK-STAT signalling of the precardiac mesoderm to differentiate into a more confined growth pattern for development of visceral mesoderm and the heart. It contributes to the looping of the heart during fetal cardiac development, but has also been found to contribute to the regulation of the heart's electrical system postnatally.

== Expression ==
tinman is expressed very early in Drosophila during the development of the embryonic mesoderm and is required for formation of the visceral and cardiac mesoderm. It is expressed transiently in the visceral mesoderm but continues to be expressed in the cardiac mesoderm. The presence of tin is required in the dorsal mesoderm for the formation of somatic muscle founder cells and, similarly, for specific subsets of muscle founder cells in the ventral-lateral regions of the somatic mesoderm. Additionally, tin is associated with the formation of the primordia of the trunk visceral mesoderm. The two major cell types of the Drosophila heart, cardial and pericardial cells, express tinman.

Because of the specificity of this gene in its location, additional genes to signal spatial constrictions are necessary for tin to function properly. The majority of enhancers in mesodermal tissues express Tinman, and ones active in heart progenitor cells are dependent on tinman gene activity.

== Clinical significance ==
In both Drosophila and vertebrates, the temporal and spatial expression of tinman is critical in determining cell lineage and patterning of the heart. In mutant or knockout organisms, the loss of tinman results in the lack of heart formation. In humans, mutations of Nkx2.5 result in some of the most common congenital heart defects. These include atrial and ventricular septal defects and tetralogy of Fallot. Abnormal placental expression of Nkx2.5 has been associated with some cases of severe, early onset preeclampsia.

Defects in this gene give rise to lethal abnormalities as the development and differentiation of the heart is dependent on the activity. When isolated in mice and exposed to genetic ablation, the myocardial genes of the mouse will still be expressed normally, but will result in embryonic lethality due from complications and defects of the heart.
