= List of long species names =

List of species with names longer than 34 letters

Living organisms are known by scientific names. These binomial names can vary greatly in length, and some of them can become very long depending on the meanings they try to convey. This list of longest species names lists the longest scientific binomials. Species in this list are grouped by length of their name. Only binomials are considered, not subgenera, trinomial names of subspecies or infraspecific names. Family is given for each species (or the closest taxonomic rank if family is unassigned), with a short explanation. The shortest scientific species names can be found in the list of short species names.

== 181 letters ==
- Bremia krungthepmahanakhonamonrattanakosinmahintharayuthayamahadilokphopnoppharatratchathaniburiromudomratchaniwetmahasathanamonpimanawatansathitsakkathattiyawitsanukamprasitnonopsis Kontos & Thines - family Peronosporaceae. This is the longest scientific name of any living or fossil organism, over twice as long as the previous record-holder (see below). Found on the leaves of the hawksbeard Crepis pyrenaica in Germany, this oomycete was named after "the official full name of Bangkok, which the species does not visually resemble at all." (Note: The ceremonial name of Bangkok is listed by Guinness World Records as the world's longest place name, and the ending non + -opsis roughly means "not resembling".) Another Bremia species published in the same paper, Bremia o, (Note: "From the Latin word 'o', referring to the astonishment about the diversity within the genus Bremia") holds the record for the shortest specific epithet. Article 23.2 of the International Code of Nomenclature for algae, fungi, and plants (Madrid Code), which governs the nomenclature of oomycetes, restricts the length of new specific epithets published on or after 1 January 2026 to between two and thirty letters; prior to this date, however, there were no official restrictions on their length—and these names were published just a few days before this rule came into effect, on 28 December 2025.

== 73 letters ==
- Myxococcus llanfairpwllgwyngyllgogerychwyrndrobwllllantysiliogogogochensis Chambers et al. 2020 - family Myxococcaceae. From 2020 to 2025, this was the longest scientific name of any organism, applied to a bacterium isolated from soil collected at Llanfairpwllgwyngyllgogerychwyrndrobwllllantysiliogogogoch, Anglesey, Wales, one of the longest place names in the world.

== 50 letters ==
- Gammaracanthuskytodermogammarus loricatobaicalensis Dybowski 1926. This was once the longest scientific name, proposed by Polish naturalist Benedykt Dybowski for amphipods from Lake Baikal (family Acanthogammaridae). The long names in that publication were all suppressed shortly afterwards by the International Code of Zoological Nomenclature, which said that they "will clearly result in more confusion than uniformity". The suppression included many other lengthy names as well, such as: Siemienkiewicziechinogammarus siemenkiewitschii (46 letters), Rhodophthalmokytodermogammarus cinnamomeus (41 letters), Toxophthalmoechinogammarus toxophthalmus (39 letters), Zienkowiczikytodermogammarus zienkowiczi (39 letters), Axelboeckiakytodermogammarus carpenteri (38 letters), Parapallaseakytodermogammarus abyssalis (38 letters), Crassocornoechinogammarus crassicornis (37 letters) and Garjajewiakytodermogammarus dershawini (37 letters).

== 44 letters ==
- † Archaeohystrichosphaeridium contortuplicatum Timofeev 1959 - phylum Acritarcha. When Russian palynologist Boris Timofeev described in 1959 this fossil microorganism, collected from Ordovician deposits of the Baltic region, it received the longest binomial of its time (after the invalidation of Dybowski's amphipod names). However, it was found that the genus Archaeohystrichosphaeridium, also created by Timofeev, had not been properly defined, and it was invalidated as well. Timofeev had described many species under this genus, other examples were Archaeohystrichosphaeridium semireticulatum (42 letters), Archaeohystrichosphaeridium quadridentatum (41 letters), Archaeohystrichosphaeridium acutangulatum (40 letters), Archaeohystrichosphaeridium cuneidentatum (40 letters) and Archaeohystrichosphaeridium patentissimum (40 letters).

== 42 letters ==
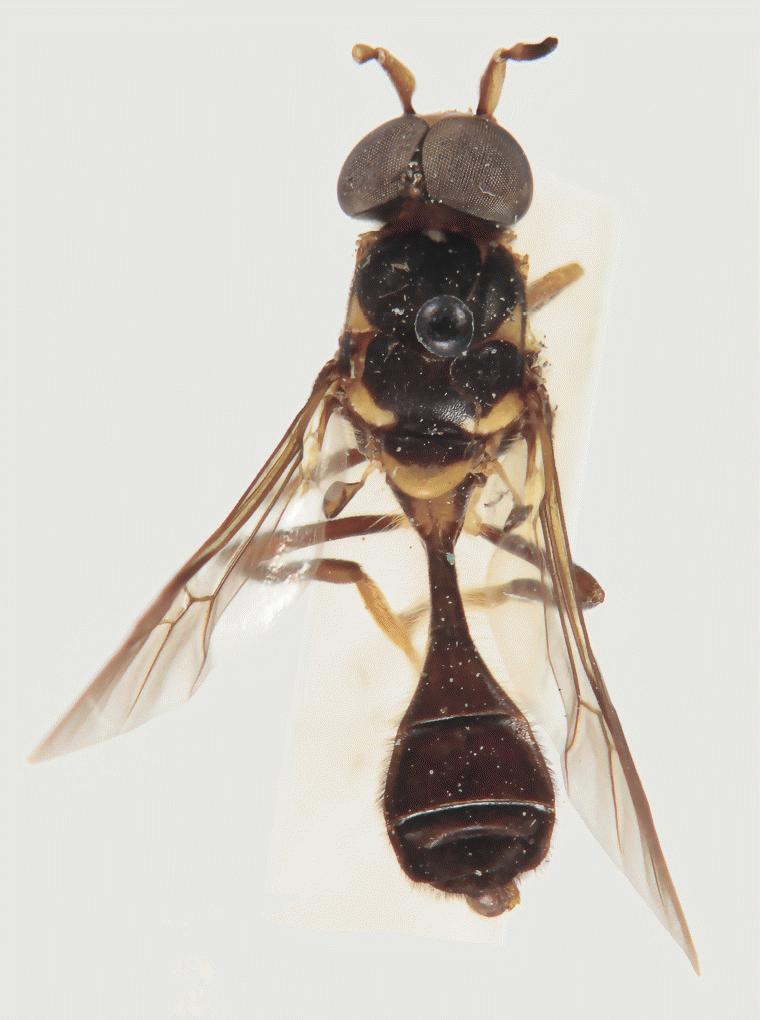
Parastratiosphecomyia stratiosphecomyioides (42 letters)

- Parastratiosphecomyia stratiosphecomyioides Brunetti 1923 - family Stratiomyidae. The Southeast Asian soldier fly, native to Thailand, has the longest valid scientific name for any animal.
- Thermoanaerobacterium thermosaccharolyticum (McClung 1935) Collins et al. 1994 - family Thermoanaerobacteraceae. This anaerobic, gram-positive bacterium was previously named Clostridium thermosaccharolyticum (32 letters), but later became one of the longest accepted binomials upon being reclassified in the genus Thermoanaerobacterium. Its complete name means "A rod which grows in the absence of air at high temperatures" "thermophilic and sugar-dissolving".

== 41 letters ==
- Alkalihalobacterium alkalicellulosilyticum corrig. (Liu et al. 2022) Li et al. 2024 - family Bacillaceae. A rod-shaped bacterium isolated from extremely alkaline red mud samples collected in China. It was originally described as Bacillus alkalicellulosilyticus (the specific name meaning "alkaline cellulose dissolving"), and subsequently became one of the longest accepted binomials upon being reclassified into genus Alkalihalobacterium (meaning "bacterium living under alkaline-saline conditions"). The spelling of the specific name was amended to finish in "-um", given that the new genus's gender is neutral rather than masculine.

== 40 letters ==
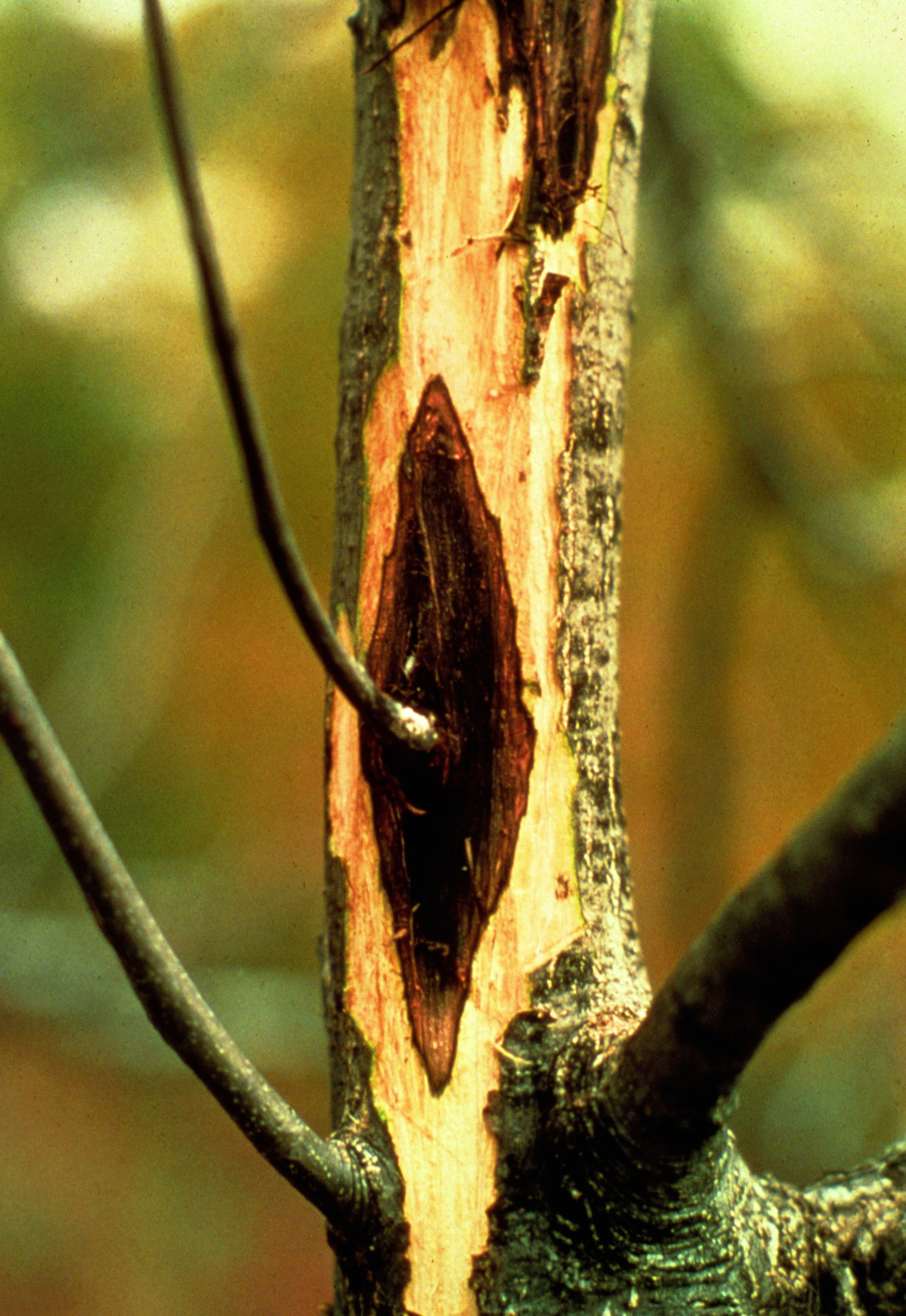
Butternut canker (Ophiognomonia clavigignenti-juglandacearum, 40 letters) on a stem

- Ophiognomonia clavigignenti-juglandacearum (Nair, Kostichka & Kuntz) Broders & Boland - family Gnomoniaceae. Butternut canker is a lethal fungal disease of butternut trees, Juglans cinerea. It was originally described as Sirococcus clavigignenti-juglandacearum (37 letters) and subsequently transferred to genus Ophiognomonia.
- Pseudochaetosphaeronema sklodowskacurieae Y.P. Tan & R.G. Shivas and Pseudochaetosphaeronema xishuangbannaense R.F. Xu & Tibpromma - family Macrodiplodiopsidaceae. Two species of fungi described in 2022 and 2024 respectively. The first one, dedicated to Marie Sklodowska-Curie, is from Australia. The second was originally described as Pseudochaetosphaeronema xishuangbannaensis (41 letters) but subsequently amended to match the gender of the genus; the specific epithet refers to the location (Xishuangbanna, Yunnan, China) where the holotype was collected.
- † Pseudoperissocytheridea parahieroglyphica Whatley 1970 - family Progonocytheridae. A fossil ostracod from the Jurassic of Great Britain. Its name reflects its similarity to Pseudoperissocytheridea hieroglyphica, also in this list.

== 39 letters ==
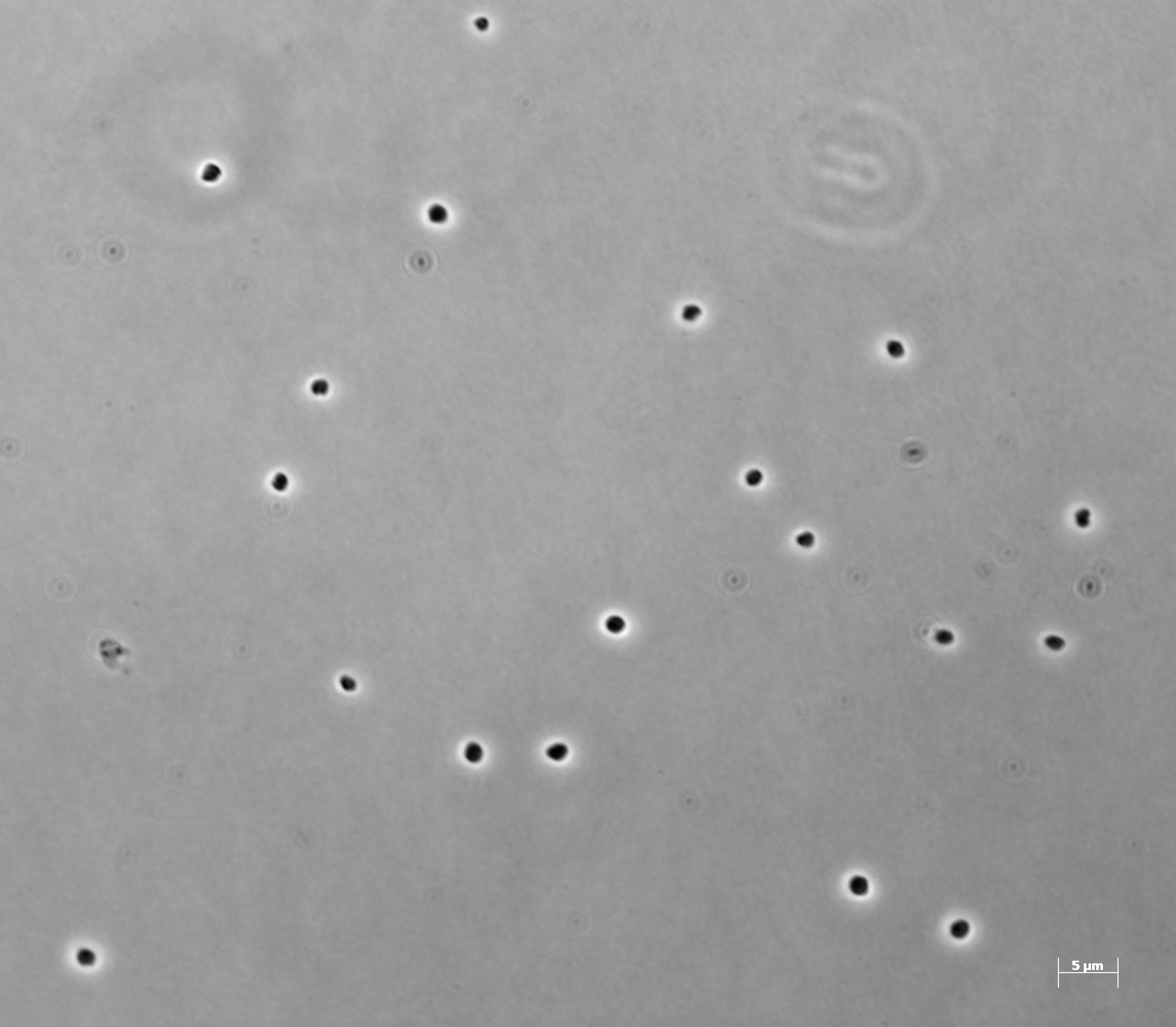
Phase-contrast photo of Methanothermococcus thermolithotrophicus (39 letters) type strain SN 1

- × Crepidiastrixeris denticulatoplatyphylla Kitam. - family Asteraceae. This daisy relative from Japan was once the longest accepted plant name, but it has since been recognised as an intergeneric hybrid and taxonomists have placed the name in synonymy within the genus Crepidiastrum as Crepidiastrum × nakaii H.Ohashi & K.Ohashi.
- Epithelionematobothrium mulloidichthydis Yamaguti 1970 - family Didymozoidae. A parasitic trematode worm found in the gills of the orange goatfish (Mulloidichthys pfluegeri) in Hawaii.
- Hysterothylacium deardorffoverstreetorum Knoff et al., 2012 - family Raphidascarididae. A marine roundworm that has been found to parasitise diverse teleost fish such as bigeyes, weakfishes, triplefins, flounders and stargazers. However, it has been considered by some authors to be a species inquirenda since it is only known from larvae and therefore its description is considered dubious. The specific name honors Drs. Thomas L. Deardorff and Robin M. Overstreet, "for their contributions to the knowledge of this group of nematodes."
- Methanothermococcus thermolithotrophicus (Huber et al. 1984) Whitman 2002 - family Methanococcaceae. An anaerobic, thermophilic archaeon that was isolated from geothermally heated sea floor. It was originally named Methanococcus thermolithotrophicus (33 letters), but later became one of the longest scientific names upon being reclassified in the genus Methanothermococcus.
- Salisediminibacterium haloalkalitolerans Sultanpuram et al. 2015 - family Bacillaceae. A Gram-positive, rod-shaped and non-motile bacterium which has been isolated from Lonar crater lake in India. Its name means "a rod from salt sediment", "briny and alkali-tolerant".
- Thermoanaerobacter thermohydrosulfuricus (Klaushofer & Parkkinen 1965) Lee et al. 1993 - family Thermoanaerobacteraceae. A thermophilic and anaerobic bacterium that reduces sulfites to hydrogen sulfide. It was previously named Clostridium thermohydrosulfuricum (32 letters), but later became one of the longest scientific names upon being reclassified in the genus Thermoanaerobacter.
- Thermoanaerobacterium thermosulfurigenes (Schink & Zeikus 1983) Lee et al. 1993 - family Thermoanaerobacteraceae. Another species of the aforementioned genus Thermoanaerobacterium, isolated from thermal springs at Yellowstone National Park. It was originally named Clostridium thermosulfurigenes (29 letters), but later became one of the longest scientific names upon being reclassified. The specific epithet translates as "releasing sulfur in heat".

== 38 letters ==
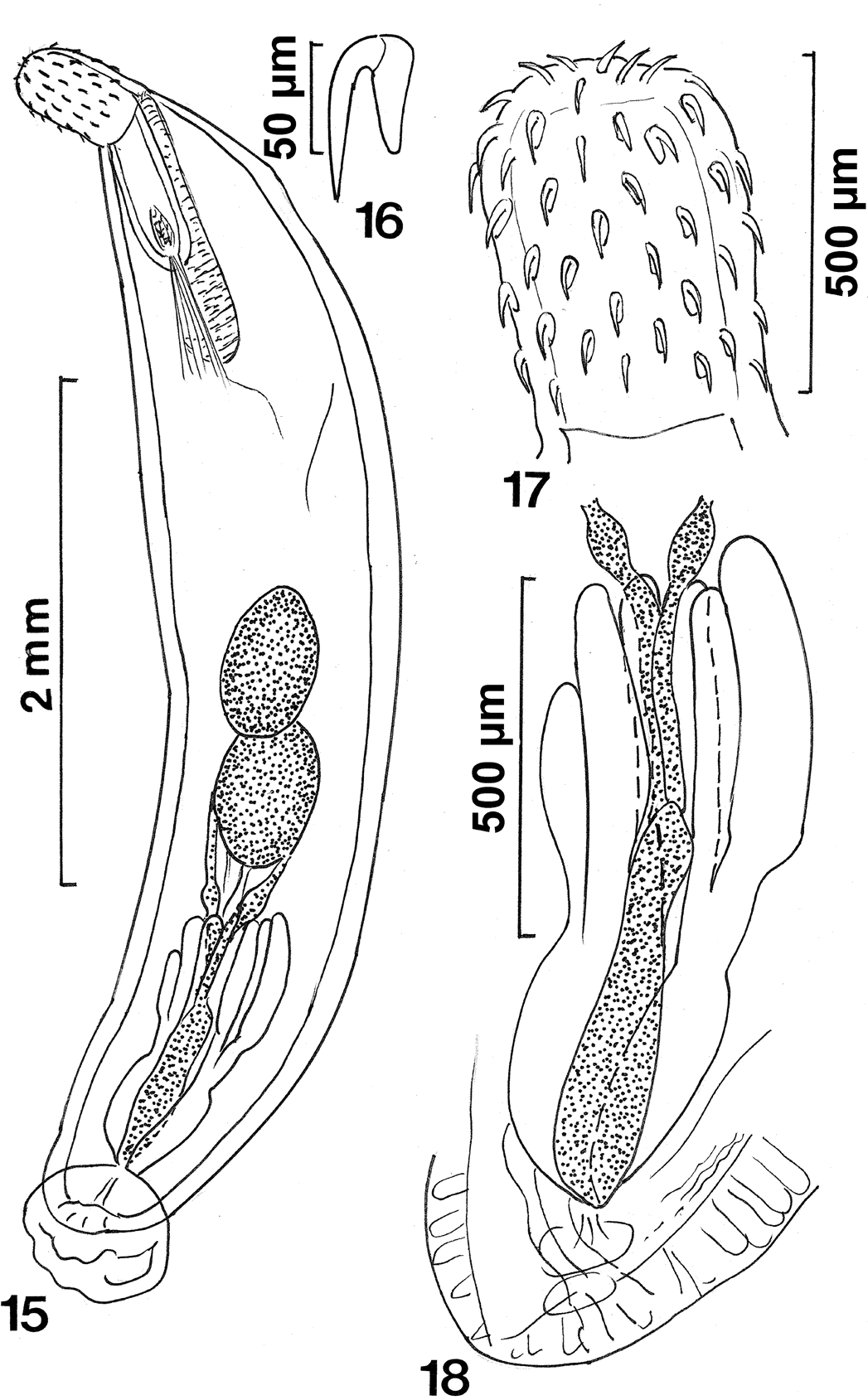
Diagram of Acanthocephalus parallelcementglandatus (38 letters)

- Acanthocephalus parallelcementglandatus Amin, Heckmann & Ha, 2014 - family Echinorhynchidae. A parasitic acanthocephalan worm described from a single specimen collected from a walking catfish in Vietnam. The species "is named for its characteristic parallel tubular cement glands."
- Alkalihalobacillus hemicellulosilyticus (Nogi et al. 2005) Patel & Gupta 2020 - family Bacillaceae. An aerobic, spore-forming, mesophilic bacterium that was isolated from soil. Originally described as Bacillus hemicellulosilyticus (28 letters), and later moved to the new genus Alkalihalobacillus, meaning: "bacillus living in alkaline and salty conditions". The specific epithet means "hemicellulose-dissolving".
- Austrocephalocereus dolichospermaticus Buining & Brederoo - family Cactaceae. This cactus from Brazil would be the longest plant name if the genus Austrocephalocereus was still accepted, but that name has been placed in synonymy with Siccobaccatus dolichospermaticus (Buining & Brederoo) P.J.Braun & Esteves, which has a mere 31 letters.
- Hydrogenoanaerobacterium saccharovorans Song & Dong 2009 - family Oscillospiraceae. An anaerobic, Gram-negative, non-motile bacterium which ferments sugars and generates hydrogen, and was first isolated in an UASB reactor.
- † Kimmeridgebrachypteraeschnidium etchesi Fleck & Nel 2003 - family Aeschnidiidae. A fossil dragonfly from the Jurassic of Kimmeridge Bay, United Kingdom. With 31 letters, Kimmeridgebrachypteraeschnidium is the longest valid genus name.
- Lacticaseibacillus parahuelsenbergensis Grabner et al., 2024 - Family Lactobacillaceae. A lactic acid bacterium isolated from corn and grass silage. Its specific epithet was formed with the prefix para-, Latin for "near", referring to its resemblance to L. huelsenbergensis, which had been described the year prior by the same team and whose epithet refers to Hülsenberg, an area in the district of Bad Segeberg, Schleswig Holstein, Germany that is the place of origin of the company carrying out the ensiling research.
- Lactiplantibacillus modestisalitolerans (Miyashita et al. 2015) Zheng et al. 2020 - Family Lactobacillaceae. This lactic acid bacterium was first isolated from traditional Thai dishes of fermented fish (pla-som) and meat (mum). Originally described as Lactobacillus modestisalitolerans (32 letters) and later moved to the genus Lactiplantibacillus in the 2020 taxonomic revision of Lactobacillus.
- Mediterraneibacter glycyrrhizinilyticus (Sakuma et al. 2006) Togo et al. 2019 - family Lachnospiraceae. An anaerobic, mesophilic bacterium that was isolated from human feces from a healthy 51 year old man. Originally described as Clostridium glycyrrhizinilyticum (31 letters) and later reclassified in genus Mediterraneibacter. Its name means "a rod from the Mediterranean Sea", "glycyrrhizin-dissolving".
- Ornithogalum adseptentrionesvergentulum (U.Müll.-Doblies & D.Müll.-Doblies) - family Asparagaceae. This monocot from the Great Karoo desert of South Africa is one of the world's most miniature bulb species (under 3 cm tall) and yet it has the longest valid plant name. The specific epithet means "inclined towards the north".
- Pseudochaetosphaeronema punithalingamii Wanas., Phookamsak & J.C. Xu - family Macrodiplodiopsidaceae. Another species in the aforementioned genus Pseudochaetosphaeronema, in this case named after Sri Lankan mycologist Eliyathamby Punithalingam, who established said genus.
- † Parapropalaehoplophorus septentrionalis Croft, Flynn & Wyss 2007 - family Chlamyphoridae. A fossil glyptodont from the Miocene of Northern Chile, which is one of the two prehistoric mammals that share the record for the longest name of any vertebrate animal.
- Pseudohalocynthiibacter aestuariivivens Won et al. 2015 - family Rhodobacteraceae. A Gram-negative, aerobic and non-motile bacterium isolated from tidal flat sediments from the South Sea in Korea.
- Pseudoparacreptotrema macroacetabulatum Pérez Ponce de León et al., 2016 - family Allocreadiidae. A parasitic fluke found in rivers of southern Mexico, where it affects freshwater fish of the genus Profundulus.
- Pseudosubramaniomyces fusisaprophyticus (Matsush.) Crous - family Beltraniaceae . A fungus from Papua New Guinea, originally described as Ramularia fusisaprophytica; the specific epithet referring to its spindle-shaped spores (fusi-) and its role as a decomposer of dead matter (-saprophytica). It was subsequently transferred to genus Subramaniomyces, which is named after prominent mycologist C. V. Subramanian (with the corresponding change of gender to the epithet); and then to Pseudosubramaniomyces, a morphologically similar but distinct genus, of which it is the type species.
- † Roberthoffstetteria nationalgeographica Marshall, de Muizon & Sigé 1983 - order Polydolopimorphia. A fossil relative of marsupials from the Paleocene of Bolivia; the generic name honours French taxonomist Robert Hoffstetter "in recognition of his contributions to knowledge of mammalian evolution in South America in general and in Bolivia in particular", while the specific name is for the National Geographic Society, which sponsored the field work that enabled the discovery of this species. It is the other prehistoric mammal that shares the record for the longest name of any vertebrate animal.
- Thalassorhabdomicrobium marinisediminis Zhao et al. 2019 - family Hyphomonadaceae. An aerobic, Gram-negative bacterium isolated from marine sediments collected in the Bohai Sea, China. Its name means "a rod-shaped microbe of the sea", "from marine sediments".
- Thioalkalivibrio thiocyanodenitrificans Sorokin et al. 2005 - family Ectothiorhodospiraceae. A mesophilic, chemolithoautotrophic, sulfur-oxidizing bacterium, capable of photosynthesis, that was isolated from mixed sediment samples from 8 hypersaline, alkaline lakes.

== 37 letters ==
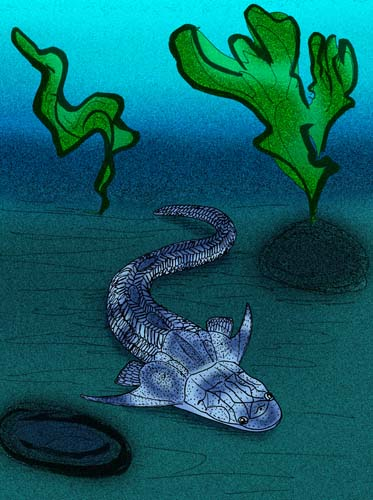
Reconstruction of Diandongpetalichthys liaojiaoshanensis (37 letters)

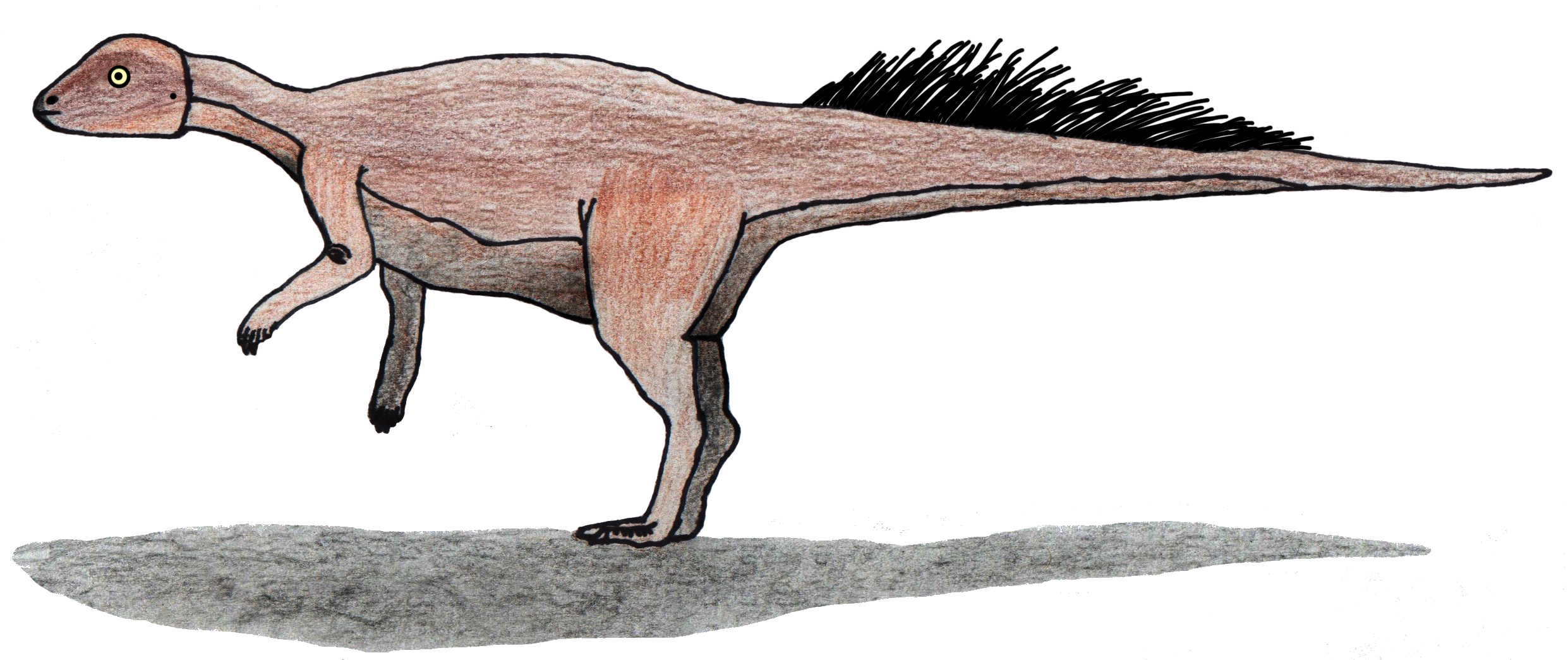
Reconstruction of Micropachycephalosaurus hongtuyanensis (37 letters)

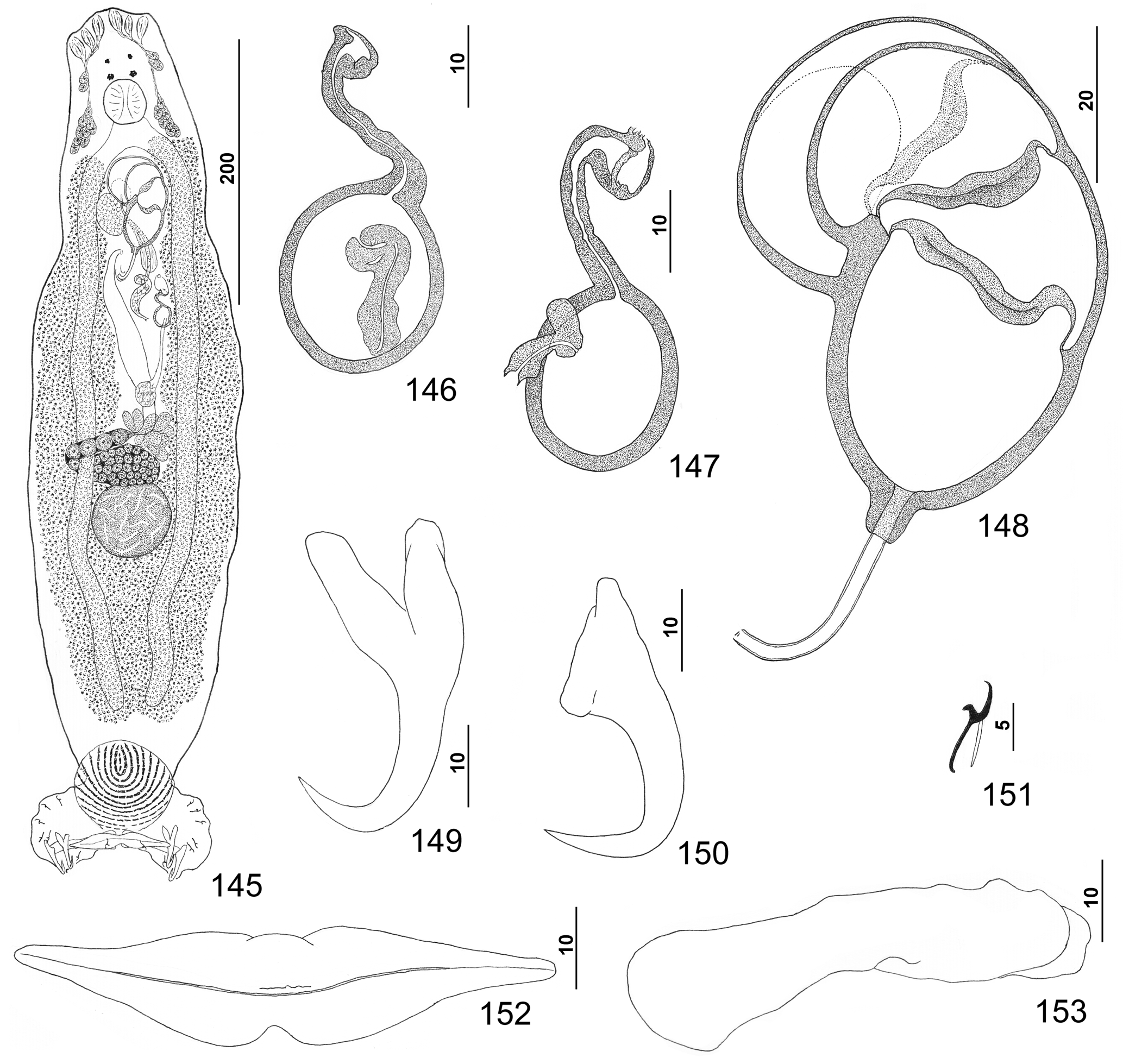
Pseudorhabdosynochus bunkleywilliamsae (37 letters)

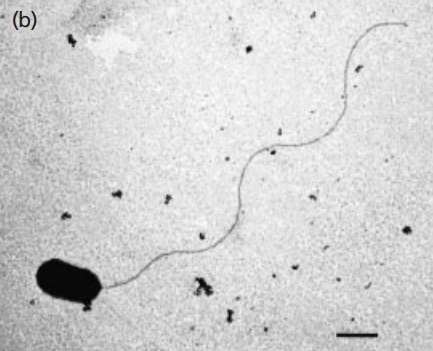
Thermodesulfobacterium hydrogeniphilum (37 letters)

- Acidipropionibacterium acidipropionici (Orla-Jensen, 1909) Scholz & Kilian, 2016 and Acidipropionibacterium microaerophilum (Koussémon et al., 2001) Scholz & Kilian, 2016 - family Propionibacteriaceae. Two bacteria which produce propionic acid. The first one is found in dairy products and has beneficial effects on the metabolism in the bovine rumen; the second one was isolated from olive mill wastewater. They were originally described in the genus Propionibacterium, and later moved to Acidipropionibacterium.
- Anaerosacchariphilus polymeriproducens Kim et al., 2019 - family Lachnospiraceae. An anaerobic bacterium isolated from sediment of a salt pond in Muan County, South Korea. Its name means "Anaerobic, sugar-loving", "producing polymers".
- Clostridium saccharoperbutylacetonicum Keis, Shaheen & Jones, 2001 - family Clostridiaceae. An indole and notably butanol-producing bacterium, first named in a 1960 patent application for a process to produce butanol by fermentation, but not described formally as an organism until 40 years later. Its specific epithet means "denoting the production of a large amount of butanol and acetone from sugar".
- Companilactobacillus ginsenosidimutans Zheng et al., 2020 and Companilactobacillus heilongjiangensis (Gu et al. 2013) Zheng et al. 2020 - family Lactobacillaceae. Two lactic acid-producing bacteria, isolated from traditional Asian fermented foods (kimchi and Chinese pickle respectively). They were originally in the genus Lactobacillus (making their names 30 letters long), but were transferred to Companilactobacillus after a 2020 taxonomic revision of the former genus which redistributed its species among 25 genera.
- † Diandongpetalichthys liaojiaoshanensis P'an & Wang, 1978 - order Petalichthyida. A fossil placoderm fish from the Early Devonian of China. It is named after Liaojiaoshan hill in Qujing, Yunnan, where the fossils where found.
- Hamatopeduncularia longiangusticirrata Soo & Tan, 2021 - Family Ancylodiscoididae. A parasitic flatworm that affects the gills of the spotted sea catfish, described from specimens collected in Malaysia. The specific name ("with a long, narrow tendril") refers to its long, slender penis.
- Lactiplantibacillus paraxiangfangensis Wang & Gu, 2024 - Family Lactobacillaceae. Another species in the aforementioned genus Lactiplantibacillus, which in this case was placed inside this genus from the outset rather than moved. This bacterium was isolated from traditional Chinese pickle and named for its resemblance to the previously described Lactiplantibacillus xiangfangensis, itself named after Xianfang District in Harbin, China.
- Methanothermobacter thermautotrophicus (Zeikus & Wolfe, 1972) Wasserfallen et al., 2000 - family Methanobacteriaceae. A methane producing, autotrophic and thermophilic archaeon, used in the biogas industry. Originally described as Methanobacterium thermoautotrophicum (35 letters), and subsequently transferred to genus Methanothermobacter.
- Microbacterium arabinogalactanolyticum (Yokota et al., 1993) Takeuchi and Hatano 1998 - family Microbacteriaceae. A Gram-positive, mesophilic bacterium that was isolated from soil, which can dissolve arabinogalactan.
- † Micropachycephalosaurus hongtuyanensis Dong, 1978 - clade Marginocephalia. A fossil herbivorous dinosaur from the Cretaceous of Shandong, China. It has the longest name of any dinosaur, or any reptile.
- Neometanematobothrioides periorbitalis Yamaguti, 1970 - family Didymozoidae. A parasitic fluke that affects the greater amberjack, and can reach 8 cm in size.
- Paeniglutamicibacter psychrophenolicus (Margesin et al., 2004) Busse 2016 - family Micrococcaceae. A Gram-positive, aerobic, facultatively psychrophilic and non-motile bacterium which was isolated from an alpine ice cave from Salzburg in Austria. Originally described as Arthrobacter psychrophenolicus (29 letters), it was subsequently moved to the genus Paeniglutamicibacter.
- Paradesulfitobacterium aromaticivorans (Kunapuli et al., 2010) Li et al., 2021 - family Desulfitobacteriaceae. An anaerobic, Gram-positive, spore-forming bacterium that reduces iron and oxidizes acetate, isolated from soil of a former coal gasification site in Gliwice, Poland. The original name under which it was described, Desulfitobacterium aromaticivorans (33 letters) means "rod-shaped bacterium that reduces sulfite", "devouring aromatic compounds". It was subsequently transferred to genus Paradesulfitobacterium.
- Pseudorhabdosynochus bunkleywilliamsae Kritsky, Bakenhaster & Adams, 2015 and Pseudorhabdosynochus magnisquamodiscum (Aljoshkina 1984) - family Diplectanidae. Two small monogenean flatworms parasitic on the gills of fish. The first (named after marine biologist Lucy Bunkley-Williams) affects the Nassau grouper, and the second one (whose specific name refers to its large squamodiscs) was found on a four-banded butterflyfish, though it's been suggested that the host record may have been accidental or erroneous, as Pseudorhabdosynochus usually only affect groupers.
- Pseudotyrannochthonius undecimclavatus (Morikawa, 1956) - family Pseudotyrannochthoniidae. A Japanese species of cave-dwelling pseudoscorpion. Originally described as Spelaeochthonius undecimclavatus (31 letters).
- Salisediminibacterium selenitireducens (Switzer Blum et al., 2001) Gupta et al. 2020 - family Bacillaceae. A spore-forming, rod-shaped, alkaliphile bacterium collected from Mono Lake, California, notable for respiring oxyanions of selenium and arsenic. Originally described as Bacillus selenitireducens (24 letters).
- Sediminispirochaeta bajacaliforniensis (Fracek & Stolz 2004) Shivani et al. 2016 - family Spirochaetaceae. Am anaerobic spirochaete isolated from muds beneath the laminated sediment in the evaporite flat at Laguna Figueroa, Baja California Norte, Mexico. Originally described as Spirochaeta bajacaliforniensis (29 letters).
- Sphaerechinorhynchus macropisthospinus Amin et al., 1998 - family Plagiorhynchidae. An acanthocephalan parasitic worm that has been found attached to the intestinal wall of a tiger (Panthera tigris) and a water monitor (Varanus salvator) in Vietnam.
- Thermodesulfobacterium hydrogeniphilum Jeanthon et al., 2002 - family Thermodesulfobacteriaceae. A thermophilic, sulfate-reducing bacterium found on hydrothermal vents in the Indian Ocean.
- Tianschanobathynella paraissykkulensis Serban, 1993 - family Bathynellidae. Bathynellacea is an order of tiny crustaceans which live interstitially in groundwater. All known species in genus Tianschanobathynella were collected from lake Issyk-Kul (Kyrgyzstan), and the genus is named after the Tian Shan mountains, where the lake is located, plus the particle bathynella ("small creature of the depths"), common to most genera in the bathynellacea. The specific name refers to this species' similarity to T. issykkulensis, which had been described earlier.

== 36 letters ==
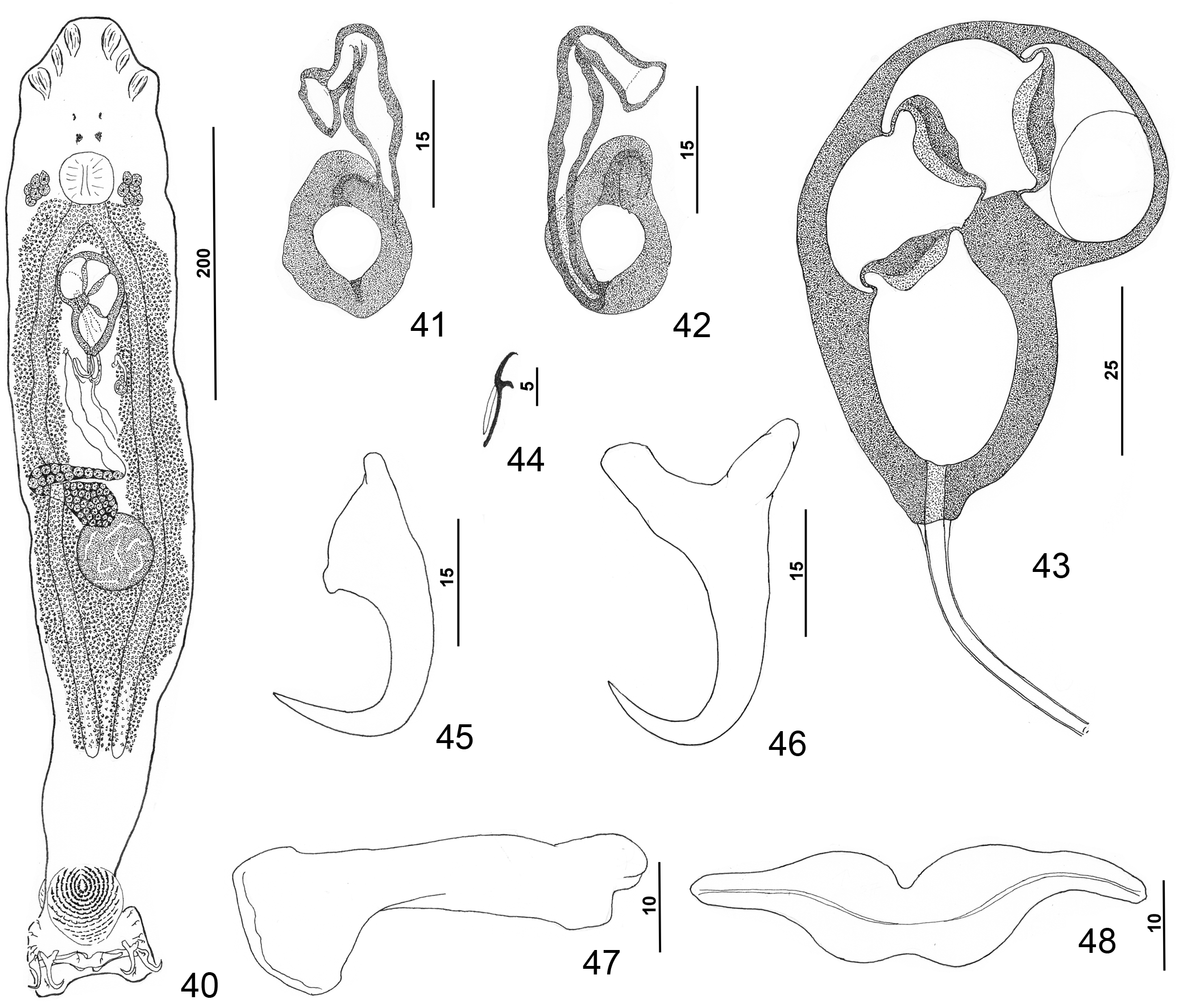
Pseudorhabdosynochus hyphessometochus (36 letters)

- Aggregatibacter actinomycetemcomitans (Klinger, 1912) Nørskov-Lauritsen and Kilian, 2006 - family Pasteurellaceae. A Gram-negative, facultative anaerobe, nonmotile bacterium often found in association with localized aggressive periodontitis, and also suspected to be involved in chronic periodontitis. It was originally described as Bacterium actinomycetemcomitans (30 letters) but later transferred to other genera, finally being assigned to Aggregatibacter.
- Alkalispirochaeta sphaeroplastigenens (Vishnuvardhan Reddy et al. 2013) Sravanthi et al. 2016 - family Spirochaetaceae. A a halo-alkaliphilic, anaerobic spirochaete bacterium isolated from Lonar Lake, India. It was originally described as Spirochaeta sphaeroplastigenens (30 letters), and later transferred to the genus Alkalispirochaeta.
- Allometanematobothrioides lepidocybii Yamaguti, 1965 - family Didymozoidae. A marine fluke that parasitises the escolar (Lepidocybium flavobrunneum), found in Hawaii.
- Anaerobiospirillum succiniciproducens Davis, Cleven, Brown & Balish, 1976 - family Succinivibrionaceae. A bacterium found in the gastrointestinal flora of dogs and cats. It can be potentially lethal to humans, but infections are rare.
- † Archaeoacanthocircus angustiannulatus Kozur, Moix & Ozsvárt, 2007 - family Archaeoacanthocircidae. A fossil radiolarian from the Triassic of Turkey.
- Arcticibacterium luteifluviistationis Li et al., 2017 - family Spirosomataceae. An aerobe, Gram-negative, rod-shaped bacterium that forms circular colonies and was isolated from Arctic seawater collected at Kongsfjorden, Svalbard, Norway. The specific epithet luteifluviistationis means "of the Yellow River Station", since it was collected and identified by scientists of this Chinese research station located in Svalbard.
- Cyrtodactylus australotitiwangsaensis Grismer et al., 2012 - family Gekkonidae. The southern Titiwangsa bent-toed gecko, endemic to peninsular Malaysia, notable for having the longest binomial name of any extant vertebrate.
- † Cryptodidymosphaerites princetonensis Currah, Stockey & B.A.LePage 1998 - order Pleosporales. A fossil hyperparasitic fungus found in the Princeton Chert deposits in Canada.
- Desulfurobacterium thermolithotrophum L'Haridon et al., 1998 - Family Desulfurobacteriaceae. A species of autotrophic, sulphur-reducing bacterium isolated from a deep-sea hydrothermal vent sample collected at the Mid-Atlantic Ridge. It is the type species of its genus, being thermophilic, anaerobic, Gram-negative, motile and rod-shaped.
- Gyrocerviceanseris passamaquoddyensis Cone, Abbott, Gilmore & Burt, 2010 - Family Gyrodactylidae. A parasitic marine flatworm described from specimens collected from silver hake. The genus name is derived from cervicus, meaning "neck", and anseris, meaning "goose"; therefore, the genus name literally means "goose-neck", in reference to the shape of the hamulus root. The specific epithet is derived from the species' type locality, Passamaquoddy Bay, Canada.
- Hammerschmidtiella muzaffarnagarensis Kumar & Anjum, 2014 - Family Thelastomatidae. A small roundworm that parasitizes American cockroaches. Genus Hammerschmidtiella honours Austrian entomologist Carl Eduard Hammerschmidt, and the species name refers to Muzaffarnagar, India, where the specimens were collected.
- Hoplophthiracarus paraaustroafricanus (Niedbała, 2021) and Hoplophthiracarus paraendroedyyoungai (Niedbała, 2006) - Family Phthiracaridae. Two South African species of Oribatid mites. Both were originally described in the genus Notophthiracarus (meaning their protonyms had 35 letters), and the specific epithets were formed with the prefix para, Latin for "near", referring to their similarity to other species, respectively: Notophthiracarus austroafricanus (Mahunka, 1984) (austroafricanus meaning "from South Africa") and Notophthiracarus endroedyyoungai (Mahunka,1984) (named after entomologist Sebastian Endrödy-Younga). Notophthiracarus subsequently became a subgenus of Hoplophthiracarus.
- Methylophaga nitratireducenticrescens Villeneuve et al., 2013 - family Piscirickettsiaceae. A Gram-negative bacterium isolated from the biofilm of the methanol-fed denitrification system treating the seawater at the Montreal Biodome, Canada. Its name means "methyl eating", "growing with the reduction of nitrate".
- Microstomatichthyoborus bashforddeani Nichols & Griscom, 1917 - family Distichodontidae. This freshwater fish from the Congo River basin has the longest name of any extant fish.
- Novosphingobium chloroacetimidivorans Chen et al. 2014 - family Sphingomonadaceae. A Gram-negative, chloroacetamide-degrading and non-spore-forming bacterium which was isolated from activated sludge from a wastewater treatment plant in Kunshan City, China.
- Oleiliquidispirillum nitrogeniifigens Li et al., 2020 - family Rhodospirillaceae. A Gram-negative, spiral-shaped bacterium, isolated from oil reservoir water collected from Liaohe oil field in northeastern China. Its name means "A rod from oil reservoir water", "nitrogen-fixing".
- Opisthorchinematobothrium nephrodomus Nikolaeva & Dubina, 1978 - family Didymozoidae. A marine fluke that parasitises the albacore, found in the Indian Ocean near the Comoro Islands.
- Pseudochaetosphaeronema chiangraiense Wijesinghe, Boonmee & K.D. Hyde and Pseudochaetosphaeronema hydeiseptatum H.Z. Du, N. Wu & Jian K. Liu - family Macrodiplodiopsidaceae. Two more species in the aforementioned genus Pseudochaetosphaeronema; the first is named after the type location, Chiang Rai, Thailand; in the case of the second, The epithet "is a combination of Prof. Kevin D. Hyde's last name and the septum observed in mature spores of asexual morph, honoring his contributions to ascomycetes taxonomy."
- Pseudonocardia tetrahydrofuranoxydans Kämpfer et al., 2006 - family Pseudonocardiaceae. A Gram-positive, rod-shaped and non-spore-forming bacterium, isolated from sludge from a waste water treatment plant in Göttingen, Germany.
- Pseudoparamacroderoides dongthapensis Truong, Curran & Bullard, 2021 and Pseudoparamacroderoides raychaudhurii Agarwal & Kumar, 1983 - family Macroderoididae. Two freshwater flukes that affect catfish of the genus Mystus: Mystus mysticetus and Mystus vittatus (striped dwarf catfish) respectively. The first is named after Đồng Tháp province, Vietnam, where the specimens were collected; the second was described from specimens collected from the Ganges river in Varanasi, India, and named after professor S.P. Ray-Chaudhuri, longtime Head of the Zoology department at Banaras Hindu University.
- † Pseudoperissocytheridea hieroglyphica (Swain & Peterson, 1951) Brand & Malz, 1962 - family Progonocytheridae. A fossil ostracod from the Jurassic of South Dakota, USA and Western Canada; and another species from the aforementioned genus Pseudoperissocytheridea. Originally described as Progonocythere hieroglyphica (27 letters) and later reclassified into genus Pseudoperissocytheridea, so named to reflect its similarity to Perissocytheridea. The specific epithet is a reference to this species' ornamentation with many deeply marked ridges.
- Pseudorhabdosynochus beverleyburtonae (Oliver, 1984) and Pseudorhabdosynochus hyphessometochus Kritsky, Bakenhaster & Adams, 2015 - family Diplectanidae. Two more species from this aforementioned genus of parasitic flatworms. The former affects the gills of the dusky grouper, the latter is a parasite of the yellowmouth grouper.
- Pseudotyrannochthonius hamiltonsmithi Beier, 1968 and Pseudotyrannochthonius queenslandicus Beier 1969 - family Pseudotyrannochthoniidae. Two cave-dwelling Australian species of the aforementioned genus of pseudoscorpions Pseudotyrannochthonius. The first one is named after Elery Hamilton-Smith, and the second after the state of Queensland.
- Schleiferilactobacillus shenzhenensis (Zou et al., 2013) Zheng et al. 2020 - family Lactobacillaceae. A lactic acid bacterium isolated from a fermented dairy beverage sold in a market in Shenzhen, China. Originally described as Lactobacillus shenzhenensis (26 letters), it was transferred to the newly created genus Schleiferilactobacillus (named after microbiologist Karl-Heinz Schleifer) in the 2020 taxonomic revision of Lactobacillus.
- Streptosporangium violaceochromogenes Kawamoto et al., 1975 - family Streptomycetaceae. An antibiotic-producing actinobacterium isolated from swamp soil collected in Kitagunma District, Japan. The specific name violaceochromogenes ("producing violet colour") refers to characteristic violet or rose-coloured pigments produced by this bacterium in natural nutritional agar media.
- Thermoanaerobacterium butyriciformans López et al., 2019, Thermoanaerobacterium saccharolyticum Lee et al., 1993 and Thermoanaerobacterium thermostercoris Romano et al., 2011 - family Thermoanaerobacteraceae. Three more species in the aforementioned genus Thermoanaerobacterium. The first two were isolated from thermal springs: T. butyriciformans ("producing butyric acid") in the Colombian Andes and T. saccharolyticum ("sugar dissolving") in Yellowstone National Park. T. thermostercoris ("thermophilic bacterium from dung") was isolated from Italian buffalo dung collected in a buffalo farm in Caserta. Its name was originally published as Thermoanaerobacterium thermostercus (34 letters), but subsequently corrected following Latin grammar rules.

== 35 letters ==
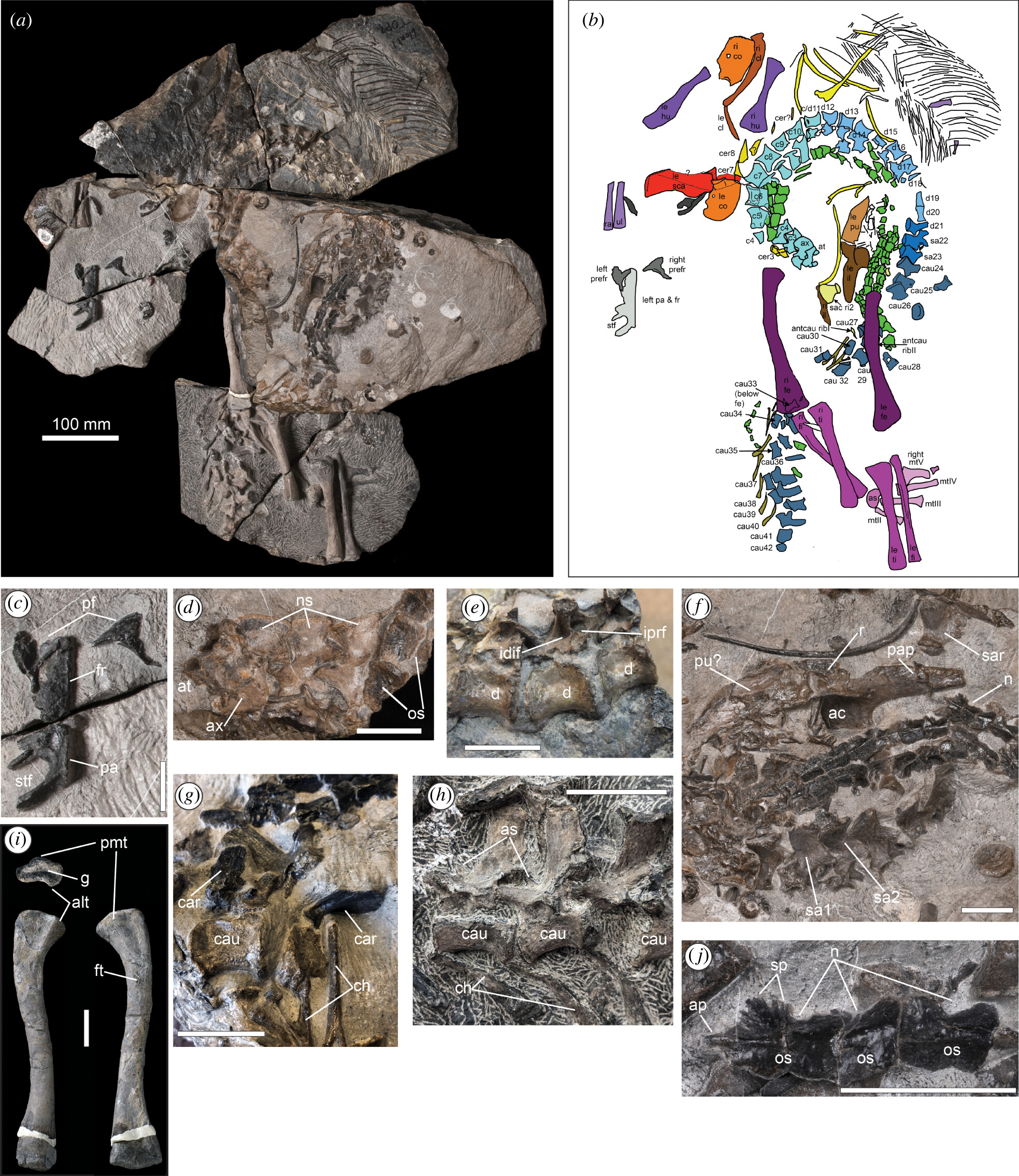
Holotype of Benggwigwishingasuchus eremicarminis, 35 letters)

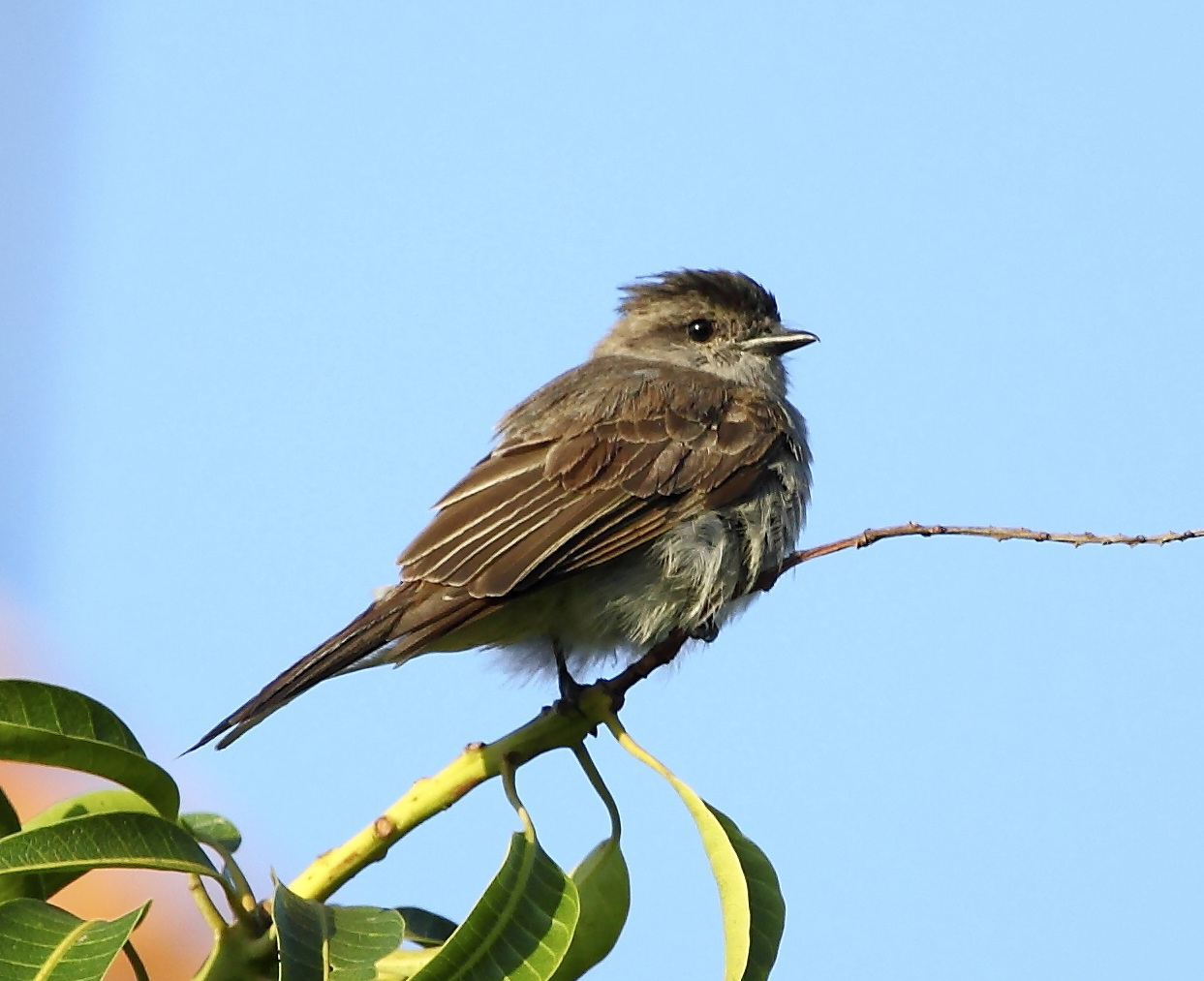
Crowned slaty flycatcher (Griseotyrannus aurantioatrocristatus, 35 letters)

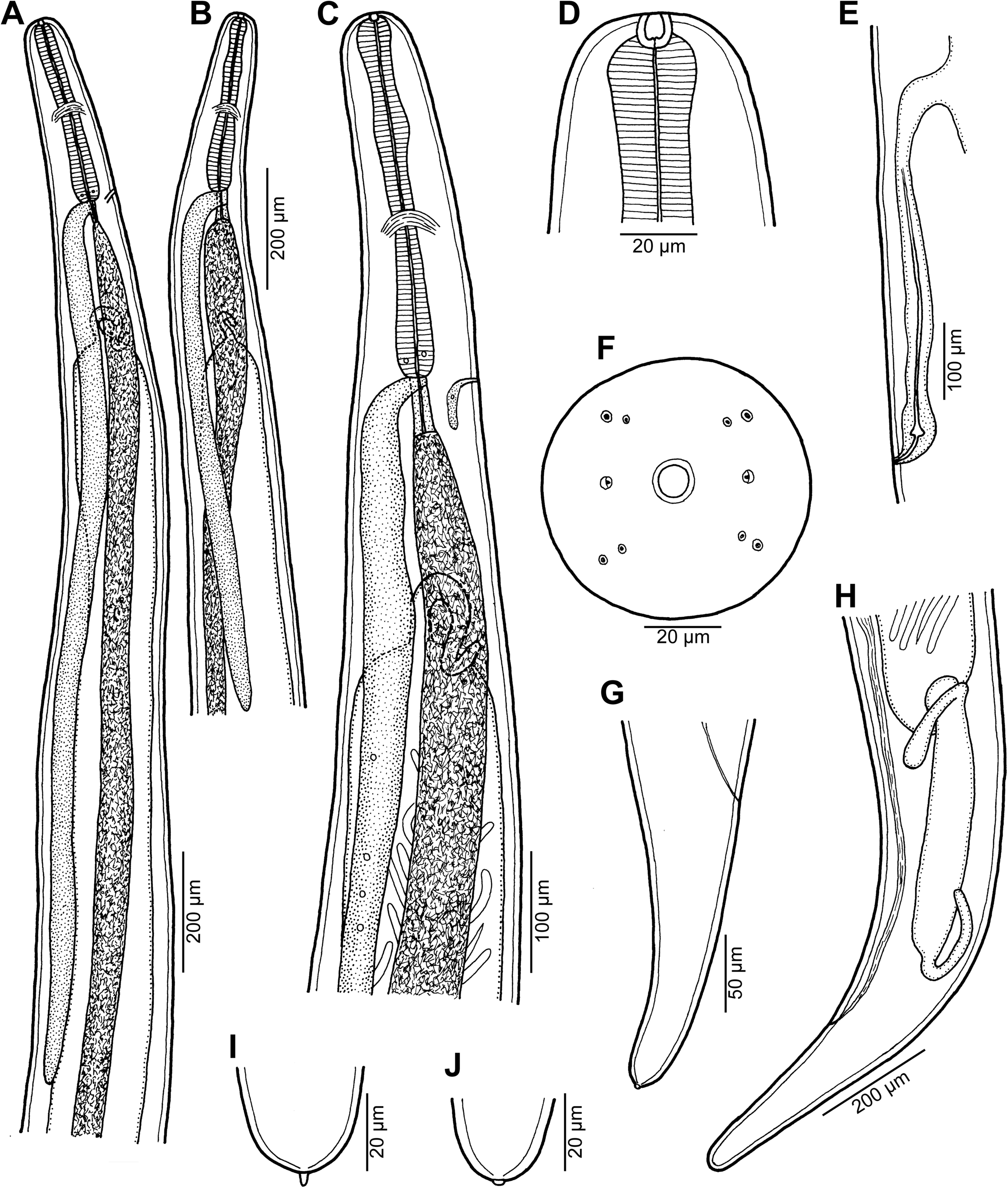
Ichthyofilaroides novaecaledoniensis, 35 letters

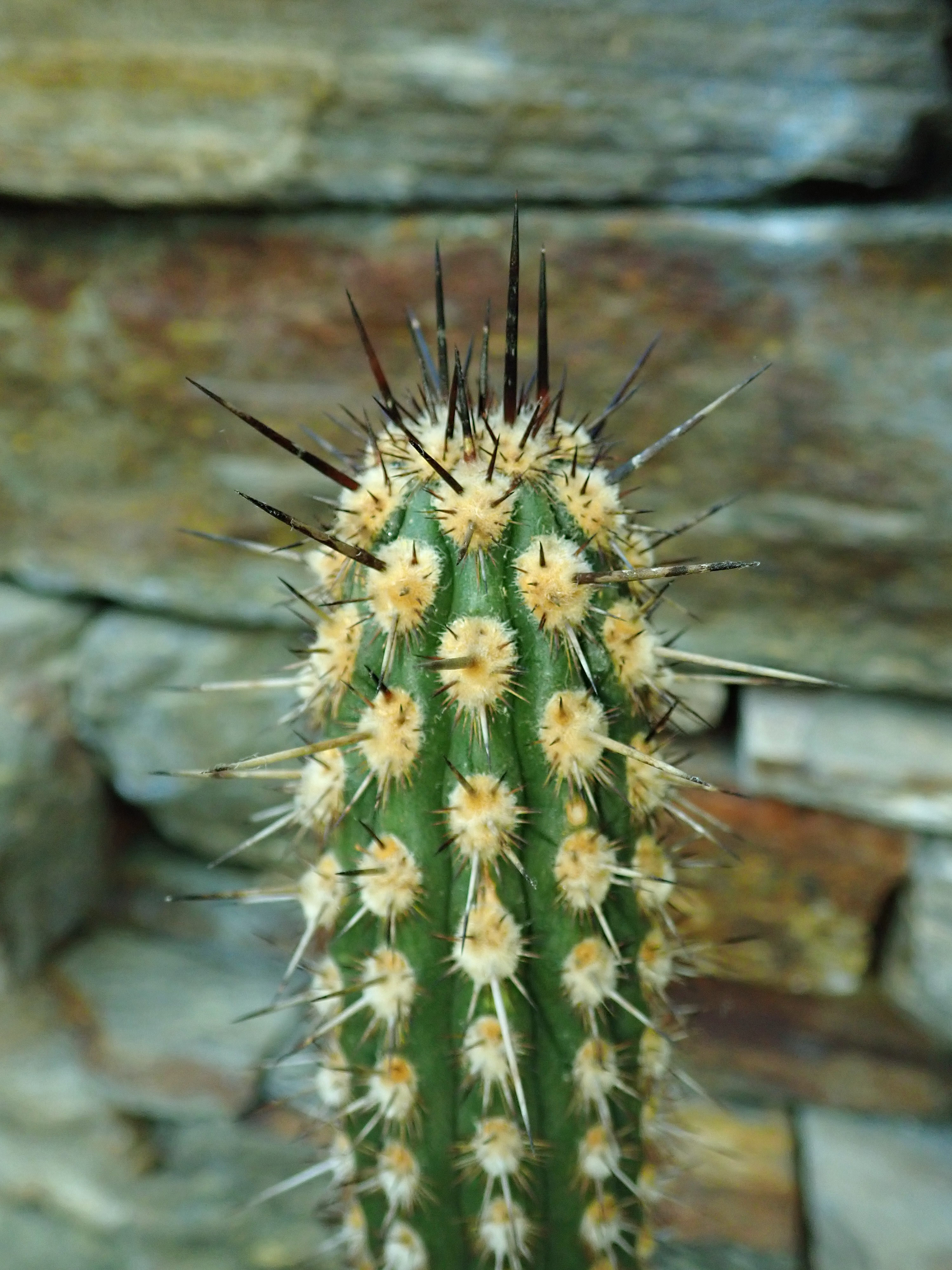
Weberbauerocereus cephalomacrostibas, 35 letters

- Alkalihalobacillus pseudalcaliphilus (Nielsen et al. 1995) Patel and Gupta 2020 - family Bacillaceae. Another species in this aforementioned genus of bacteria, isolated from soil samples at Heriot-Watt University. It was originally described as Bacillus pseudalcalophilus (25 letters); the specific epithet was corrected to pseudalcaliphilus upon validation, and the species was subsequently transferred to genus Alkalihalobacillus in 2020.
- Benggwigwishingasuchus eremicarminis Smith et al., 2024 - clade Poposauroidea. A species of Middle Triassic Pseudosuchian archosaur from the Fossil Hill Member in Nevada, which while found in marine sediments shows no obvious aquatic adaptations, suggesting that it was adapted to foraging along the coastline instead of diving for fish. The genus name derives from a Shoshone word meaning "one who fishes" and the Greek suchus meaning "crocodile", while the specific name means "desert song", honouring the discoverers of the fossil, who are noted for their love of opera.
- Caldicellulosiruptor saccharolyticus Rainey et al., 1995 - family Thermoanaerobacterales Family III. A thermophilic, anaerobic cellulolytic bacterium, which was isolated from a piece of wood floating in the flow from a freshwater thermal spring in New Zealand in 1987, and tentatively named Caldocellum saccharolyticum (26 letters). In 1994, the isolate was more thoroughly characterized physiologically, and classified to a new genus, Caldicellulosiruptor. It is the type species, and most thoroughly studied member of its genus. Its name means "cellulose-breaker under hot conditions", "breaking up polysaccharides".
- Chilobrachys jonitriantisvansickleae Nanayakkara, Sumanapala & Kirk, 2019 - family Theraphosidae. This tarantula from Sri Lanka has the longest binomial name of any spider. Its specific name refers to one of the co-founders of the environmental NPO Idea Wild, Joni Triantis Van Sickle, "who was kind enough to donate research equipment to the first author and [to honor] Idea Wild's continuous support to further research in fauna and flora around the globe." This specific name was originally spelt jonitriantisvansicklei by its describers; however, this is the correct ending only when the person it is named after is a man, but Joni Triantis Van Sickle is a woman. As per Article 32.5.1 of the ICZN, the World Spider Catalog subsequently corrected the name to have the feminine genitive ending jonitriantisvansickleae.
- Companilactobacillus paralimentarius (Cai et al., 1999) Zheng et al., 2020 - family Lactobacillaceae. Another lactic acid bacterium from the aforementioned genus Companilactobacillus; its original name before the genus transfer was Lactobacillus paralimentarius (28 letters). This species was isolated from sourdough in Japan.
- Corynebacterium pseudodiphtheriticum Lehmann & Neumann, 1896 - family Corynebacteriaceae. This bacterium is commonly found as part of the indigenous microbiota of human skin and pharynx; however, in some cases it can cause clinically significant infections, particularly in immunocompromised patients. Its name means "club-shaped bacterium relating to false diphtheria".
- Cradoscrupocellaria macrorhynchoides Vieira, Spencer Jones & Winston, 2013 - family Candidae. A bryozoan from the coasts of Australia. The generic name adds the prefix krados, Greek for branch, alluding to the characteristic branched scutum of some species previously assigned to Scrupocellaria van Beneden, 1845; the specific epithet refers to its similarity to Cradoscrupocellaria macrorhyncha, found in the Mediterranean Sea.
- Cypselurobranchitrema spilonotopteri Yamaguti, 1966 - family Gastrocotylidae. A monogenean parasitic flatworm which affects the gills of the stained flying fish (Cheilopogon spilonotopterus) (named Cypselurus spilonotopterus when this parasite was described).
- Dehalogenimonas lykanthroporepellens Moe et al., 2009 - family Dehalococcoidaceae. An anaerobic, Gram-negative bacterium, isolated from a Superfund site in Baton Rouge, Louisiana. It is useful in bioremediation for its ability to reductively dehalogenate chlorinated alkanes. The generic name refers to this ability, while the specific epithet means "repelling werewolves", because compounds exhibiting a pungent garlic aroma are produced when these organisms grow in certain conditions; garlic being said to repel werewolves in some fiction literature.
- Desulfonatronovibrio hydrogenovorans Zhilina et al., 1997 - family Desulfohalobiaceae. An alkaliphilic, sulfate-reducing bacterium isolated from a soda-depositing lake, Lake Magadi in Kenya.
- Eustenancistrocerus baluchistanensis (Cameron, 1907) - family Vespidae. A potter wasp native to Balochistan, Pakistan. Originally described as Odynerus baluchistanensis (24 letters), and subsequently transferred to genus Eustenancistrocerus.
- Fructilactobacillus sanfranciscensis (Weiss and Schillinger 1984) Zheng et al. 2020 - family Lactobacillaceae. A lactic acid bacterium which helps give sourdough bread its characteristic taste. It is named after the city of San Francisco, where sourdough was found to contain the variety, though it is dominant in Type I sourdoughs globally. Originally described as Lactobacillus sanfrancisco (25 letters), the specific epithet was amended to become an adjective ("from San Francisco"), and it was later transferred to new genus Fructilactobacillus in the 2020 taxonomic revision of genus Lactobacillus.
- † Glandulopleurostomella subcylindrica (Hantken, 1875) - family Polymorphinidae. A fossil foraminiferan from the Paleogene of Hungary. Originally described as Polymorphina subcylindrica (25 letters) and later transferred to newly created genus Glandulopleurostomella (of which it is the type species), its specific epithet refers to its similarity to Guttulina cylindrica.
- Griseotyrannus aurantioatrocristatus (d'Orbigny & Lafresnaye, 1837) - family Tyrannidae. The crowned slaty flycatcher from South America, after being moved from the genus Empidonomus to its own monotypic genus Griseotyrannus, holds the record of longest scientific binomial for any bird (extant or fossil).
- Halodesulfovibrio spirochaetisodalis Shivani et al., 2017 - family Desulfovibrionaceae. An antibiotic-producing, anaerobic, Gram-negative bacterium, isolated from marine soil samples collected in Gujarat, India.
- † Hemisphaerocoryphe pseudohemicranium (Nieszkowski, 1859) - family Cheiruridae. A fossil trilobite from the Ordovician of Estonia. It was originally described as Sphaerexochus pseudohemicranium (30 letters) and subsequently transferred to the genus Hemisphaerocoryphe. There has been some discussion as to whether Hemisphaerocoryphe is a valid genus or just a junior synonym of Sphaerocoryphe, but most authors who mention this species place it in the former.
- Hypodontolaimus schuurmansstekhoveni Gerlach, 1951 - family Chromadoridae. A marine free-living roundworm found in the North Sea, named after Dutch nematologist J.H. Schuurmans Stekhoven.
- Ichthyofilaroides novaecaledoniensis (Moravec & Justine, 2009) - family Guyanemidae. A marine parasitic roundworm which affects the lemon ghost flathead (Hoplichthys citrinus), found in New Caledonia. It was originally described as Ichthyofilaria novaecaledoniensis (32 letters), and subsequently transferred to its own monotypic genus, Ichthyofilaroides.
- Lacticaseibacillus songhuajiangensis (Gu et al. 2013) Zheng et al. 2020 - family Lactobacillaceae. A lactic acid bacterium isolated from traditional sourdough in Heilongjiang province, China, and named after the Songhua River, which flows through this province. Originally described as Lactobacillus songhuajiangensis and transferred to Lacticaseibacillus in the 2020 taxonomic revision of Lactobacillus.
- Methylobacterium nonmethylotrophicum Feng et al., 2020 - family Methylobacteriaceae. A gram-negative, aerobic, non-spore-forming, rod-shaped, motile bacterium with a flagellum (monotrichous), isolated from tungsten mine tailings in Jiangxi Province, China.
- Natronolimnohabitans innermongolicus (Itoh et al., 2005) Sorokin et al., 2020 - family Natrialbaceae. A haloalkaliphilic archaeon isolated from a soda lake in Inner Mongolia, China. It was originally described as Natronolimnobius innermongolicus (31 letters), and subsequently transferred to newly created genus Natronolimnohabitans, which means "an organism living in soda lakes".
- Neometanematobothrioides rachycentri (Parukhin, 1969) - family Didymozoidae. Another species in this aforementioned genus of marine flukes, which in this case affects the cobia (Rachycentrum canadum) and was identified in the Gulf of Tonkin. It was originally described as Nematobothrium rachycentri (25 letters), and subsequently transferred to genus Neometanematobothrioides.
- Opisthorchinematobothrium parathunni Yamaguti, 1970 - family Didymozoidae. Another species in this aforementioned genus of marine flukes, which in this case which affects the bigeye tuna
- † Paleopolymorphina pleurostomelloides (Franke, 1928) - family Polymorphinidae. A fossil foraminiferan from the Cretaceous of Germany. Originally described as Polymorphina pleurostomelloides (30 letters) and later transferred to newly created genus Paleopolymorphina (of which it is the type species), its specific epithet refers to the similarity of its test with those of genus Pleurostomella.
- Paradesulfitobacterium ferrireducens Li et al., 2021 - family Desulfitobacteriaceae. Another species in this aforementioned genus of bacteria, characterised, as its specific epithet indicates, by its ability to reduce iron. It was isolated from petroleum-contaminated soil sampled in Qingyang, Gansu, China.
- † Paraexophthalmocythere rodewaldensis Bartenstein & Brand 1959 - family Cytheridae. A fossil ostracod from the Cretaceous of Germany, which takes its specific name from a borehole in Rodewald, where the first specimens were collected.
- Pseudarthrobacter phenanthrenivorans (Kallimanis et al., 2009) Busse, 2016 - family Micrococcaceae. An aerobic, gram-positive bacterium isolated from a sample of creosote-contaminated soil collected in Greece. Originally described as Arthrobacter phenanthrenivorans (30 letters), and later transferred to newly created genus Pseudarthrobacter. Its name means "Similar to a jointed rod", "that can digest phenanthrene".
- Pseudoacanthocephalus rhampholeontos Smales, 2005 - family Echinorhynchidae. A parasitic acanthocephalan worm described from specimens collected from the intestines of chameleons of the genus Rhampholeon.
- Pseudophyllodistomum macrobrachicola (Yamaguti, 1934) - family Gorgoderidae. A parasitic fluke that affects freshwater shrimp, such as Macrobrachium nipponense. It is found in Japan. Originally described as Phyllodistomum macrobrachicola (29 letters) and later transferred to newly created genus Pseudophyllodistomum.
- Pseudorhadinorhynchus dussamicitatum Gupta & Gupta 1972 - family Illiosentidae. A marine parasitic acanthocephalan worm that has been found in the intestines of Indian fish such as the blacktip sea catfish (Plicofollis dussumieri) and the crescent banded grunter.
- Pseudoschikhobalotrema heterocotylum (Nahhas & Cable, 1964) - family Haplosplanchnidae. A marine parasitic fluke found in the Caribbean Sea, affecting the rainbow parrotfish. It was originally described as Schikhobalotrema heterocotylum (29 letters), and subsequently transferred to genus Pseudoschikhobalotrema.
- † Pseudoschloenbachia antsirasiraensis Collignon, 1969 - family Muniericeratidae. A fossil species of ammonite from the Cretaceous of Madagascar, found near the village of Antsirasira.
- Pseudotyrannochthonius australiensis Beier, 1966 - family Pseudotyrannochthoniidae. Another Australian species in this aforementioned genus of pseudoscorpions.
- Scolopendrelloides pseudocongolensis Domínguez Camacho, 2010 - family Scutigerellidae. A species of garden centipede from the Democratic Republic of the Congo.
- Secundilactobacillus paracollinoides (Suzuki et al. 2004) Zheng et al. 2020 - family Lactobacillaceae. This rod-shaped bacterium was isolated from brewery environments in Japan. It was originally named Lactobacillus paracollinoides, with the specific epithet referring to its similarity to L. collinoides (collinoides means hill-shaped, pertaining to colony form); it was subsequently transferred to genus Secundilactobacillus in the 2020 revision of Lactobacillus.
- Sphingosinithalassobacter tenebrarum Zheng & Sun, 2020 - family Sphingomonadaceae. A Gram-negative, facultatively anaerobic, yellow-pigmented, non-motile, rod-shaped bacterium, isolated from a deep-sea cold seep. Its name means "sphingosine-containing rod bacterium from the sea" "of the darkness".
- Stigmatodactylus dalagangpalawanicum A.S.Rob. - family Orchidaceae. A small orchid endemic to the island of Palawan in the Philippines, where it is called "dalaga ng Palawan" in Tagalog: the 'Maiden of Palawan'. One of two species that share the title of the second longest accepted plant name.
- Streptomyces phaeoluteichromatogenes Goodfellow et al., 2008 and Streptomyces purpurogeneiscleroticus Pridham, 1970 (Approved Lists, 1980) - family Streptomycetaceae. Two species of actinobacteria; the first was isolated at Rothamsted Research (UK) and its specific epithet means "producing brown and yellow colors". The second, which comes from India, was originally described as Chainia purpurogena (only 18 letters); when the genus Chainia was synonymised with Streptomyces, this species was assigned the replacement name Streptomyces purpurogeniscleroticus (34 letters), and the spelling of this name was later amended to the current version for grammatical correctness, by adding one letter. The specific epithet means "producing purple colour and sclerotia".
- Terasakiispira papahanaumokuakeensis Zepeda et al., 2015 - family Halomonadaceae. A Gram-negative, helical gammaproteobacterium cultivated from an anchialine pool on Pearl and Hermes Atoll, Northwestern Hawaiian Islands. Its name means "Terasaki's spiral" (honouring microbiologist Yasuke Terasaki, for his contributions to the study of spiral-shaped bacteria) "from Papahānaumokuākea Marine National Monument".
- Thermodesulfobacterium hveragerdense Sonne-Hansen & Ahring, 2000 - family Thermodesulfobacteriaceae. Another species in this aforementioned genus of bacteria; this one was isolated from hotsprings in Iceland and named after the town of Hveragerði, where it was found.
- Thermosediminibacter litoriperuensis Lee et al., 2006 - family Thermosediminibacteraceae. An anaerobic, thermophilic bacterium that was isolated from deep sea sediments of the Peru margin collected during the Ocean Drilling Program.
- Variimorphobacter saccharofermentans Rettenmaier et al., 2021 - family Lachnospiraceae. An anaerobic, Gram-negative bacterium isolated from a lab-scale biogas fermenter fed with maize silage. Its name means "rod shaped cells with variable morphology", "sugar-fermenting".
- Weberbauerocereus cephalomacrostibas (Werderm. & Backeb.) F.Ritter - family Cactaceae. This Peruvian cactus was originally described as Cereus cephalomacrostibas (24 letters); the specific epithet is derived from the Greek words kephale for 'head', makros for 'big' and stibas for 'bed', and refers to the large areoles that almost flow together near the tips of the shoots. It was later transferred to genus Weberbauerocereus, named for German botanist August Weberbauer. The second of two species that share the title of the second longest accepted plant name.
