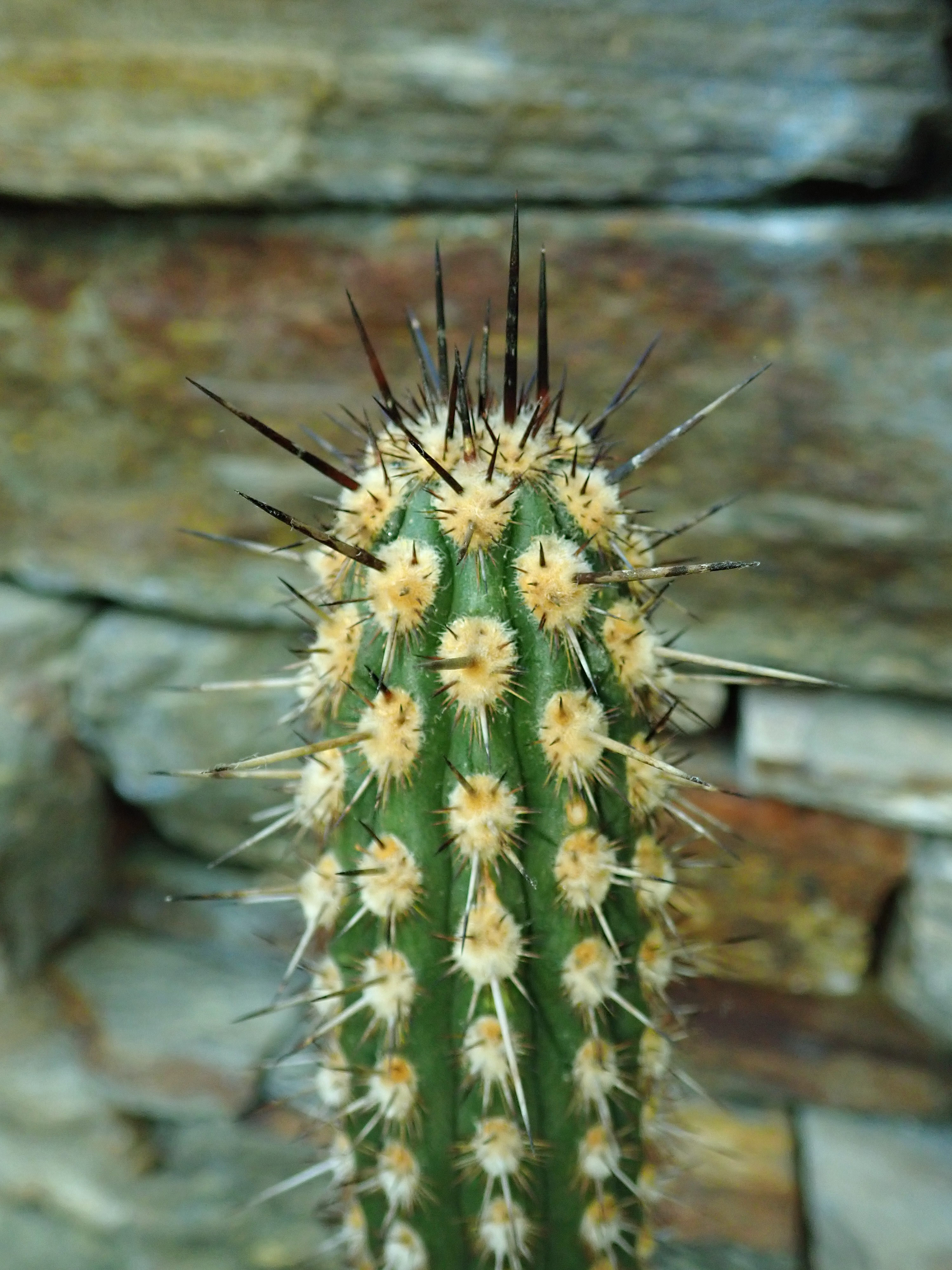

Conservation status
- Endangered (IUCN 3.1)

Scientific classification
- Kingdom: Plantae
- Clade: Tracheophytes
- Clade: Angiosperms
- Clade: Eudicots
- Order: Caryophyllales
- Family: Cactaceae
- Subfamily: Cactoideae
- Genus: Weberbauerocereus
- Species: W. cephalomacrostibas

Binomial name
- Weberbauerocereus cephalomacrostibas (Werderm. & Backeb.) F. Ritter, 1981

Synonyms
- Cereus cephalomacrostibas Werderm. & Backeb. 1931; Echinopsis cephalomacrostibas (Werderm. & Backeb.) H.Friedrich & G.D.Rowley 1974; Haageocereus cephalomacrostibas (Werderm. & Backeb.) P.V.Heath 1995; Trichocereus cephalomacrostibas (Werderm. & Backeb.) Backeb. 1932

= Weberbauerocereus cephalomacrostibas =

Species of cactus

Weberbauerocereus cephalomacrostibas is a species of cactus in the family Cactaceae. It is found in Arequipa Department, Peru and consists of 2 subpopulations.

== Description ==
Weberbauerocereus cephalomacrostibas grows shrubby and forms dense groups up to 2 metres (6 ft 7 in) high. The cylindrical, gray-green shoots reach a diameter of up to 10 cm (3.9 in). There are eight broad ribs that are grooved transversely. The conspicuous areoles on it are brown and are clustered at the tips of the shoots. The one to four very strong central spines are curved backwards and interlocking. They are dark brown and turn gray with age. The central spines are sometimes angular and grooved. They are up to 12 cm (4.7 in) long. The up to 20 radial spines are thin and very short.

The funnel-shaped, white flowers open at night. They grow up to 12 cm (4.7 in) long and reach a diameter of 10 cm (3.9 in). The spherical to elongated fruits are reddish to yellowish orange.

== Distribution ==
Weberbauerocereus cephalomacrostibas is found in the Arequipa Department of Peru in montane areas along the coast.

== Taxonomy ==
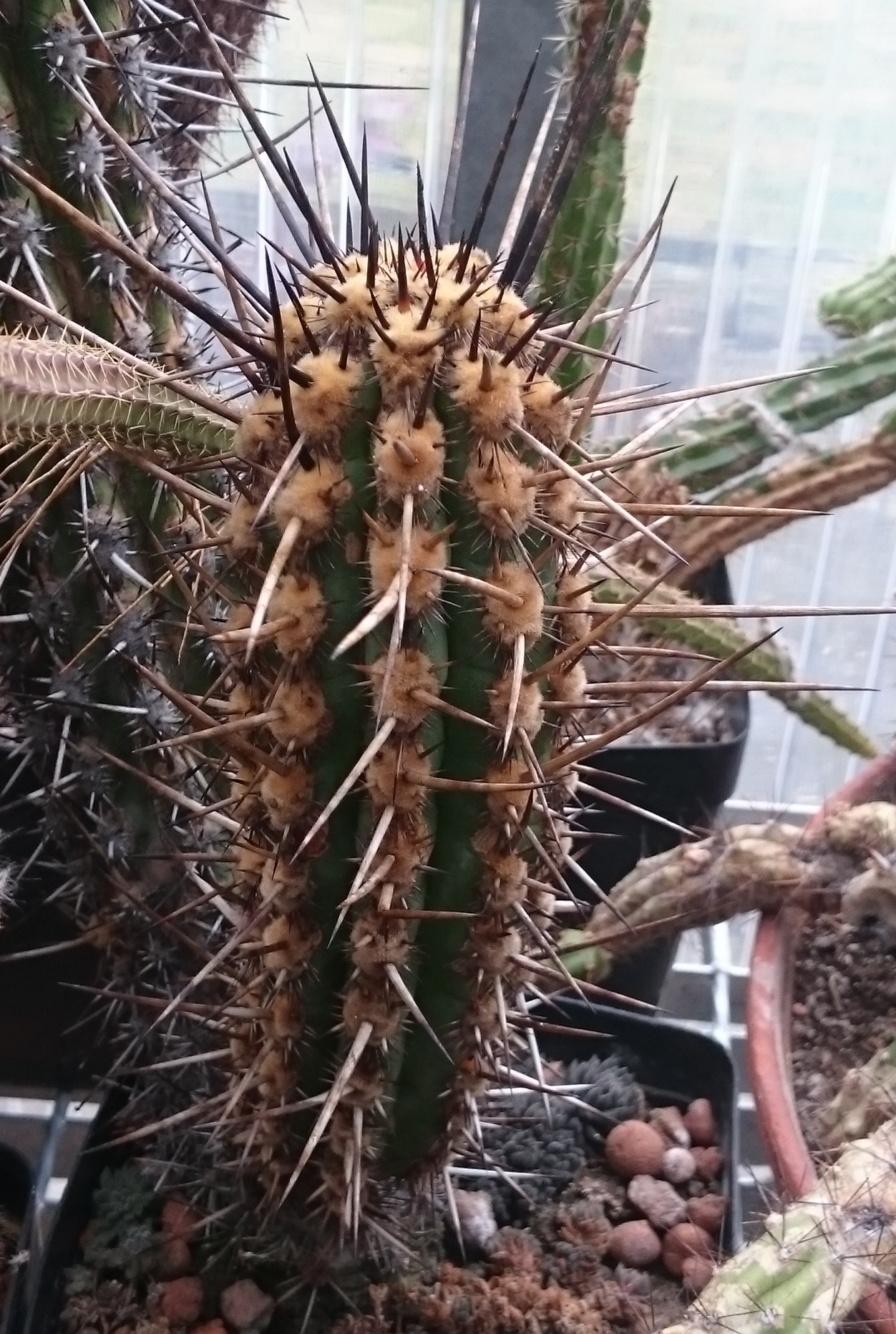

The first description as Cereus cephalomacrostibas by Erich Werdermann and Curt Backeberg was published in 1931. The specific epithet cephalomacrostibas is derived from the Greek words kephale for 'head', makros for 'big' and stibas for 'bed' and refers to the large areoles that almost flow together near the tips of the shoots. Friedrich Ritter placed the species in the genus Weberbauerocereus in 1981. Further nomenclature synonyms are Trichocereus cephalomacrostibas (Werderm. & Backeb.) Backeb. (1936), Echinopsis cephalomacrostibas (Werderm. & Backeb.) H.Friedrich & G.D.Rowley (1974) and Haageocereus cephalomacrostibas (Werderm. & Backeb.) P.V.Heath (1995).

== See also ==
- List of long species names
