= Ophiognomonia nana =

Scientific classification
- Kingdom: Fungi
- Division: Ascomycota
- Class: Sordariomycetes
- Order: Diaporthales
- Family: Gnomoniaceae
- Genus: Ophiognomonia
- Species: O. nana

Binomial name
- Ophiognomonia nana (Rehm) Sogonov

Species of fungus in Europe

Ophiognomonia nana is a species of fungi in the family Gnomoniaceae. It is found in Europe, most commonly Finland, Germany, and Switzerland.
