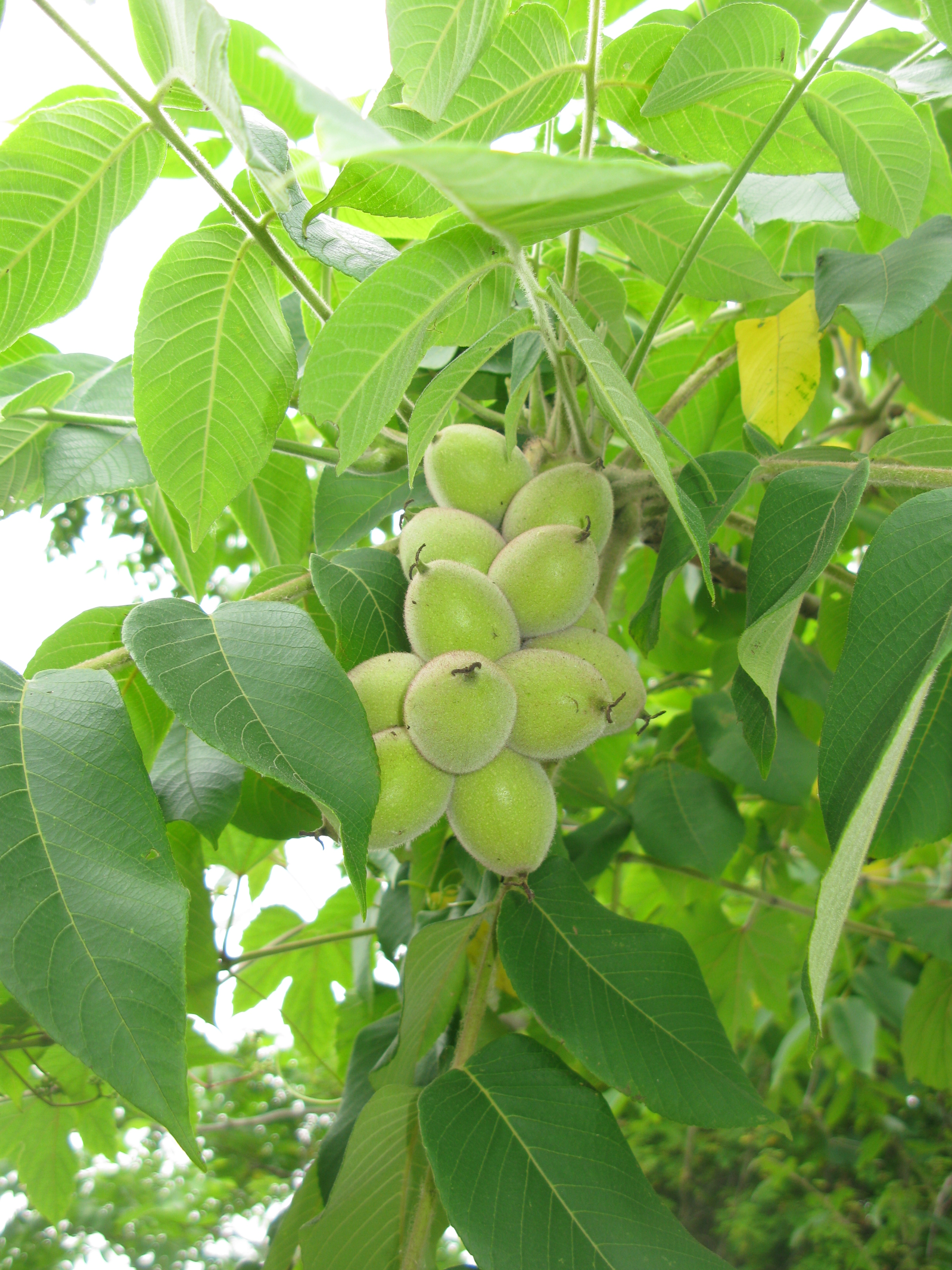
- Foliage and nuts

Scientific classification
- Kingdom: Plantae
- Clade: Tracheophytes
- Clade: Angiosperms
- Clade: Eudicots
- Clade: Rosids
- Order: Fagales
- Family: Juglandaceae
- Genus: Juglans
- Section: Juglans sect. Cardiocaryon
- Species: J. ailantifolia

Binomial name
- Juglans ailantifolia Carr.

= Juglans ailantifolia =

Japanese walnut

Species of fruit and plant

Juglans ailantifolia (synonyms J. cordiformis and J. sieboldiana and J. mandshurica var. sachalinensis), the Japanese walnut (Japanese: 鬼胡桃, romanized: oni-gurumi), is a species of walnut native to Japan and Sakhalin.

== Description ==
It is a deciduous tree growing to 20 m (66 ft) tall, rarely 30 m (98 ft), and 40–80 centimetres (16–31 in) stem diameter, with light grey bark. The leaves are pinnate, 50–90 cm (20–35 in) long, with 11–17 leaflets, each leaflet 7–16 cm (3–6 1/2 in) long and 3–5 cm (1–2 in) broad. The whole leaf is downy-pubescent, and a somewhat brighter, yellower green than many other tree leaves.

The male flowers are inconspicuous yellow-green catkins produced in spring at the same time as the new leaves appear. The female flowers have pink/red pistils. The fruit is a nut, produced in bunches of 4–10 together; the nut is spherical, 3–5 cm long and broad, surrounded by a green husk before maturity in mid-autumn.

== Diseases ==
The only significant disease Japanese walnuts are susceptible to is the walnut bunch disease.

== Cultivars ==
The heartnut is a cultivar of Japanese walnut distinguished by its fruit, which is heart-shaped in cross-section, very hard to crack, and able to yield unbroken nut meat when cracked. The heartnut is a sweet nut without a bitter aftertaste often intrinsic with black and Persian walnuts. This is the subspecies that hybridizes with butternuts, creating 'buartnuts', or Juglans x bixbyi.

== Uses ==
The edible nuts have an oily texture. The husks are also used to make a yellowish dye.

The bold, decorative leaves and catkins produced in spring make it a popular ornamental tree in parks and large gardens.

Unlike the closely related and very similar North American butternut, Japanese walnut is resistant to the canker disease caused by the fungus Sirococcus clavigignenti-juglandacearum. This has led to its being planted as a replacement for butternuts in North America. The two species hybridise readily; the resulting hybrid Juglans x bixbyi (otherwise known as J. cinerea x ailantifolia or 'buartnut') is also resistant to canker and is likewise planted as a replacement for butternuts. Japanese walnut is distinguished from butternut by its larger leaves and round (not oval) nuts. Prospect Rock Permaculture in Vermont has been backcrossing buartnuts with native butternuts, resulting in 'butterbuarts', which will most likely bear greater resemblance to the butternut parentage, although may also be more susceptible to the canker.

The wood is light and takes polish well, but is of much lower quality than Persian walnut wood. It is often used to make furniture.

== Gallery ==
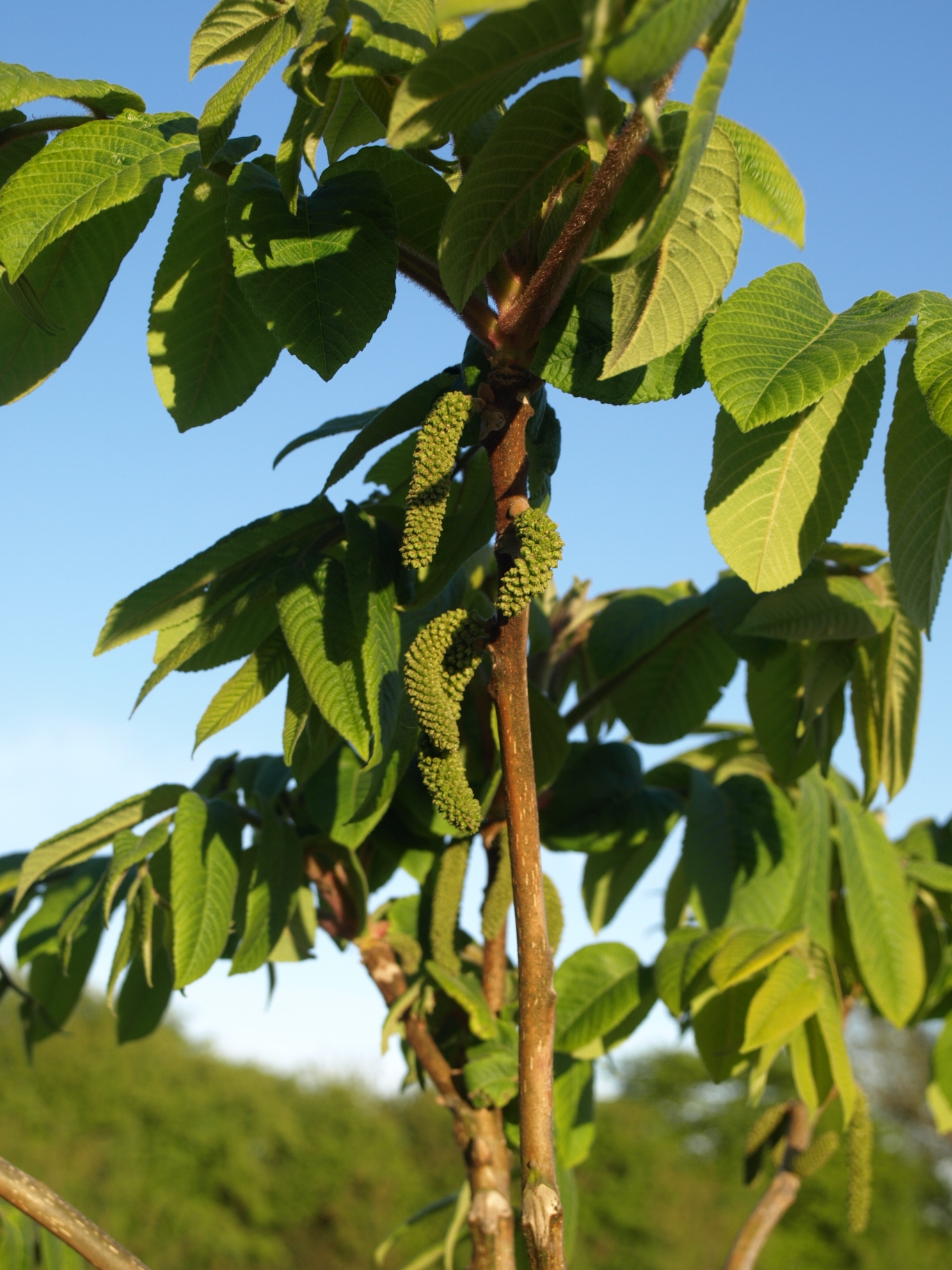
Heartnut in flower

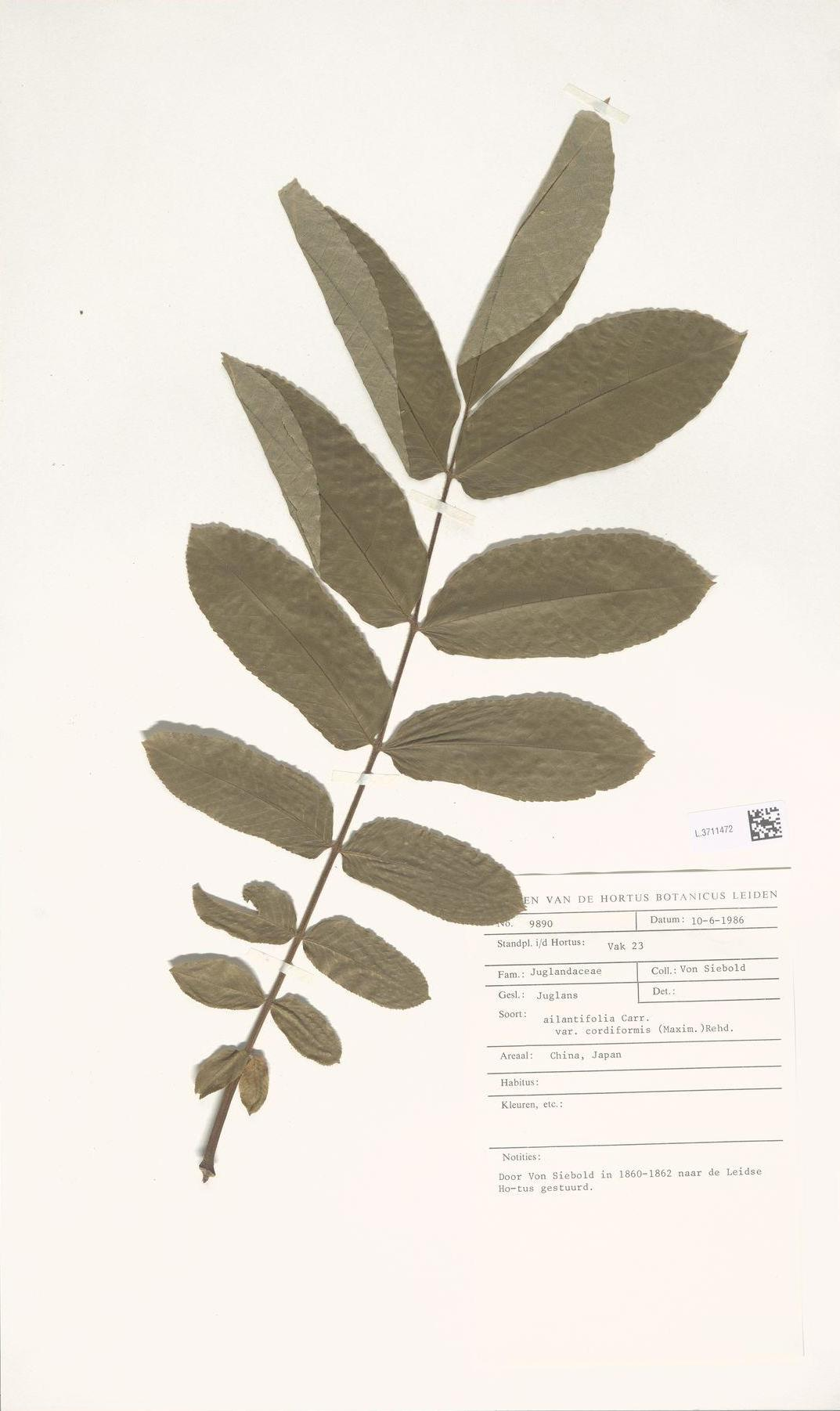
Herbarium sheet, 19th century

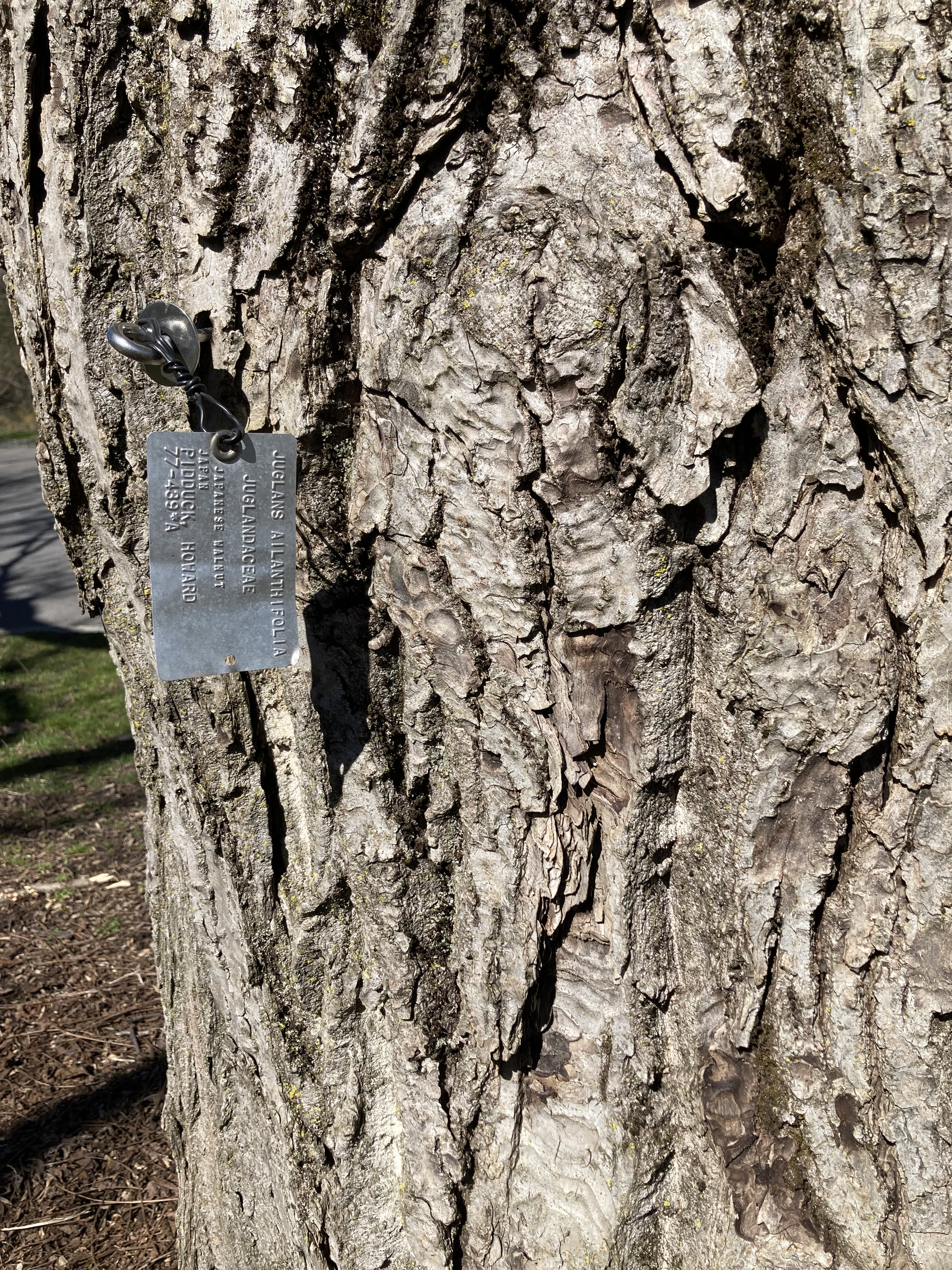
Juglans ailantifolia bark at the Cornell Botanic Gardens

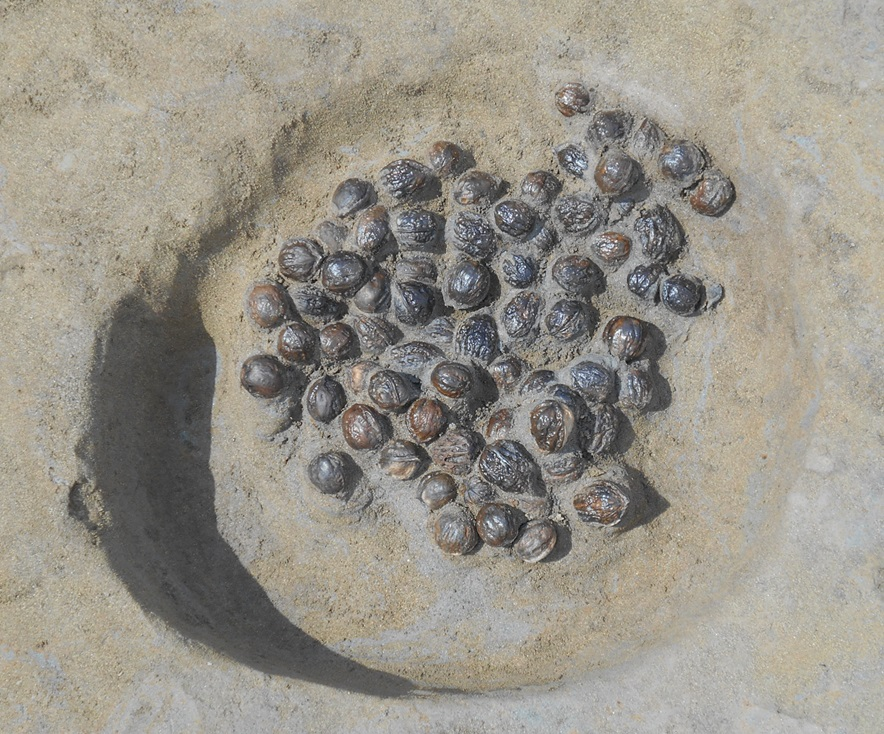
Remains of Japanese walnuts from a storage pit of the Yayoi period

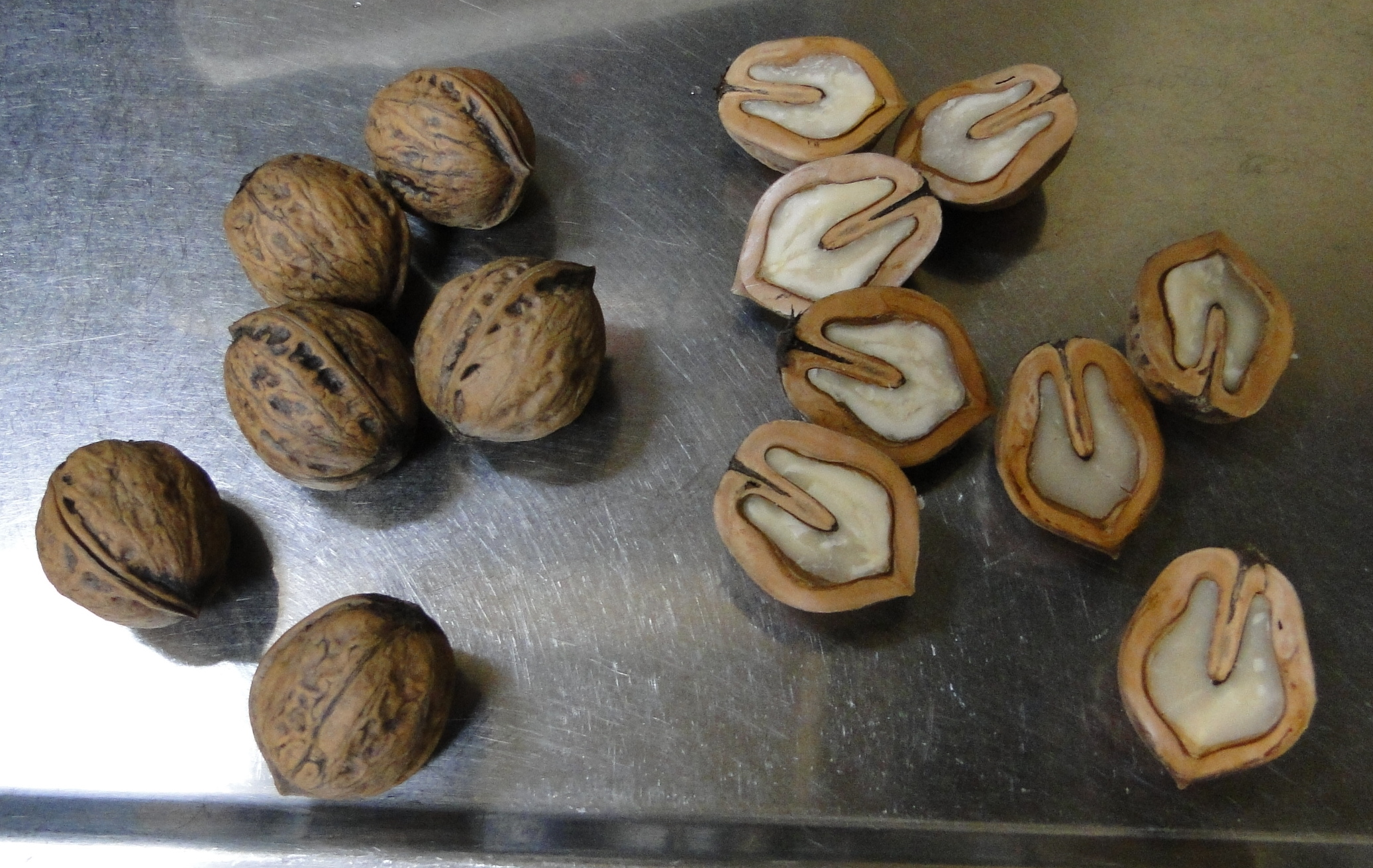
Fruits (Walnuts)
