= Pseudohalocynthiibacter =

Scientific classification
- Domain: Bacteria
- Kingdom: Pseudomonadati
- Phylum: Pseudomonadota
- Class: Alphaproteobacteria
- Order: Rhodobacterales
- Family: Rhodobacteraceae
- Genus: Pseudohalocynthiibacter; Won et al. 2015

Type species
- Pseudohalocynthiibacter aestuariivivens

Species
- P. aestuariivivens

Genus of bacteria

Pseudohalocynthiibacter is a Gram-negative, aerobic and non-motile genus of bacteria from the family of Rhodobacteraceae with one known species (Pseudohalocynthiibacter aestuariivivens). Pseudohalocynthiibacter aestuariivivens has been isolated from a tidal flat sediments from the South Sea in Korea.
