= Eustenancistrocerus =

Scientific classification
- Domain: Eukaryota
- Kingdom: Animalia
- Phylum: Arthropoda
- Class: Insecta
- Order: Hymenoptera
- Family: Vespidae
- Subfamily: Eumeninae
- Genus: Eustenancistrocerus; Blüthgen, 1938

Type species
- Odynerus blanchardianus Saussure, 1855

Species
- See text

Genus of wasps

Eustenancistrocerus is an Afrotropical, Palearctic and Oriental genus of potter wasps. The species in this genus include:

- Eustenancistrocerus amadanensis (Saussure, 1856)
- Eustenancistrocerus askhabadensis (Rad., 1886)
- Eustenancistrocerus baluchistanensis (Cameron, 1907)
- Eustenancistrocerus blanchardianus (Saussure, 1855)
- Eustenancistrocerus egidae (Giordani Soika, 1936)
- Eustenancistrocerus haarlovi Giordani Soika, 1962
- Eustenancistrocerus inconstans (Saussure, 1863)
- Eustenancistrocerus iratus Giordani Soika, 1990
- Eustenancistrocerus israelensis Giordani Soika, 1952
- Eustenancistrocerus jerichoensis (Schulthess, 1928)
- Eustenancistrocerus jucundus Giordani Soika 1962
- Eustenancistrocerus khuzestanicus Giordani Soika, 1970
- Eustenancistrocerus lufirae Meade-Waldo, 1915
- Eustenancistrocerus malus Giordani Soika, 1970
- Eustenancistrocerus nilensis (Giordani Soika, 1935)
- Eustenancistrocerus parazairensis (Giordani Soika, 1934)
- Eustenancistrocerus pharaoh (Saussure, 1863)
- Eustenancistrocerus roubaudi (Bequaert, 1916)
- Eustenancistrocerus spinosissimus Gusenleitner, 2000
- Eustenancistrocerus spinosus Gusenleitner, 1998
- Eustenancistrocerus sulcithorax Giordani Soika, 1970
- Eustenancistrocerus tegularis (Moravitz, 1885)
- Eustenancistrocerus transitorius (Morawitz 1867)
