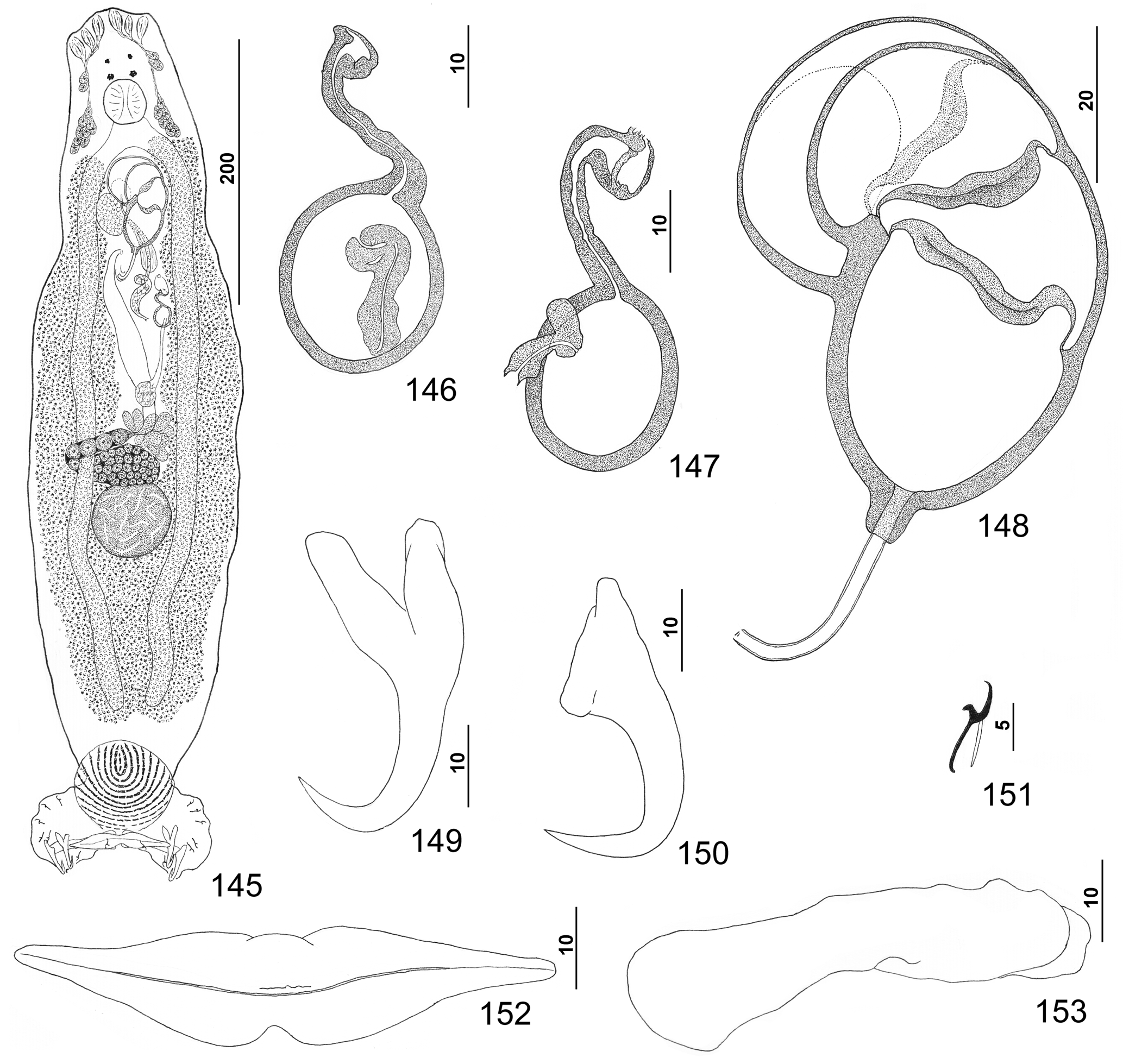
- Body and sclerotised parts

Scientific classification
- Kingdom: Animalia
- Phylum: Platyhelminthes
- Class: Monogenea
- Order: Dactylogyridea
- Family: Diplectanidae
- Genus: Pseudorhabdosynochus
- Species: P. bunkleywilliamsae

Binomial name
- Pseudorhabdosynochus bunkleywilliamsae Kritsky, Bakenhaster & Adams, 2015

= Pseudorhabdosynochus bunkleywilliamsae =

Species of flatworm

Pseudorhabdosynochus bunkleywilliamsae is a diplectanid monogenean parasitic on the gills of the Nassau grouper, Epinephelus striatus. It has been described by Kritsky, Bakenhaster and Adams in 2015.

== Description ==
Pseudorhabdosynochus bunkleywilliamsae is a small monogenean, 420–697 μm in length. The species has the general characteristics of other species of Pseudorhabdosynochus, with a flat body and a posterior haptor, which is the organ by which the monogenean attaches itself to the gill of is host. The haptor bears two squamodiscs, one ventral and one dorsal. The sclerotized male copulatory organ, or "quadriloculate organ", has the shape of a bean with four internal chambers, as in other species of Pseudorhabdosynochus. The vagina includes a sclerotized part, which is a complex structure.

== Etymology ==
According to Kritsky, Bakenhaster & Adams (2015), Pseudorhabdosynochus bunkleywilliamsae was named for Dr. Lucy Bunkley-Williams, University of Puerto Rico, Mayagüez, Puerto Rico, in recognition of her extensive research on the parasites of fishes occurring within the environs of Puerto Rico. She and Dr. Ernest Williams collected and preserved the specimens of P. bunkleywilliamsae on which the description was based.

== Diagnosis ==
Kritsky, Bakenhaster & Adams (2015) wrote that Pseudorhabdosynochus bunkleywilliamsae most closely resembles Pseudorhabdosynochus justinella, a parasite of Epinephelus morio, in the general morphology of the vaginal sclerite and in the shape and number of concentric rows of rodlets in the squamodisc. It differs from P. justinella by having ventral anchors with subequal superficial and deep roots (deep root shorter than superficial root in P. justinella), and a dorsal bar having a bifid lateral end (lateral end with elongate lobe and not bifurcated in P. justinella). While the vaginal sclerites of the two species are very similar, that of P. justinella lacks the tubular extension that apparently gives rise to the proximal vaginal canal in P. bunkleywilliamsae.

== Hosts and localities ==
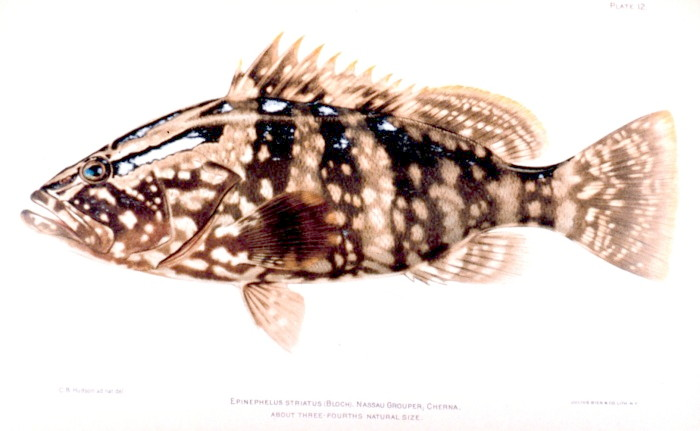
The Nassau grouper, Epinephelus striatus is the type-host of Pseudorhabdosynochus bunkleywilliamsae

The type-host and only recorded host of P. bunkleywilliamsae is the Nassau grouper, Epinephelus striatus (Serranidae: Epinephelinae). The type-locality and only recorded locality is La Parguera, Puerto Rico.
