= Streptomyces purpurogeneiscleroticus =

Scientific classification
- Domain: Bacteria
- Kingdom: Bacillati
- Phylum: Actinomycetota
- Class: Actinomycetes
- Order: Streptomycetales
- Family: Streptomycetaceae
- Genus: Streptomyces
- Species: S. purpurogeneiscleroticus

Binomial name
- Streptomyces purpurogeneiscleroticus Pridham 1970

Type strain
- ATCC 19348, BCRC 13317, BCRC 15113, CBS 409.66, CBS 659.72, CCRC 13317, CCRC 15113, CGMCC 4.1929, CM 3103, CMI 112722, CMI 117722, DSM 40271, DSM 43156, HACC 186, HAMBI 1061, IFO 13001, IFO 13358, IFO 13903, IPV 1528, ISP 5271, JCM 3080, JCM 3103, JCM 4818, KCC A-0103, KCC S-0818, NBRC 13001, NBRC 13358, NBRC 13903, NCIB 10981, NCIMB 10981, NRRL B-2952, NRRL-ISP 5271, PCM 2306, RIA 1319, RIA 886, Thirumalachar C-3

Synonyms
- Chainia purpurogena

Species of bacterium

Streptomyces purpurogeneiscleroticus is a bacterium species from the genus of Streptomyces which has been isolated from soil.

== See also ==
- List of Streptomyces species
