= Southern Titiwangsa bent-toed gecko =

Scientific classification
- Kingdom: Animalia
- Phylum: Chordata
- Class: Reptilia
- Order: Squamata
- Suborder: Gekkota
- Family: Gekkonidae
- Genus: Cyrtodactylus
- Species: C. australotitiwangsaensis

Binomial name
- Cyrtodactylus australotitiwangsaensis Grismer, Wood Jr., Quah, Anuar, Muin, Sumontha, Ahmad, Bauer, Wangkulangkul, Grismer & Pauwels, 2012

Species of lizard

The southern Titiwangsa bent-toed gecko (Cyrtodactylus australotitiwangsaensis) is a species of gecko endemic to peninsular Malaysia.
