= Streptomyces phaeoluteichromatogenes =

Scientific classification
- Domain: Bacteria
- Kingdom: Bacillati
- Phylum: Actinomycetota
- Class: Actinomycetia
- Order: Streptomycetales
- Family: Streptomycetaceae
- Genus: Streptomyces
- Species: S. phaeoluteichromatogenes

Binomial name
- Streptomyces phaeoluteichromatogenes Goodfellow et al. 2008

Type strain
- DSM 41898, NRRL B-5799

Species of bacterium

Streptomyces phaeoluteichromatogenes is a bacterium species from the genus of Streptomyces.

== See also ==
- List of Streptomyces species
