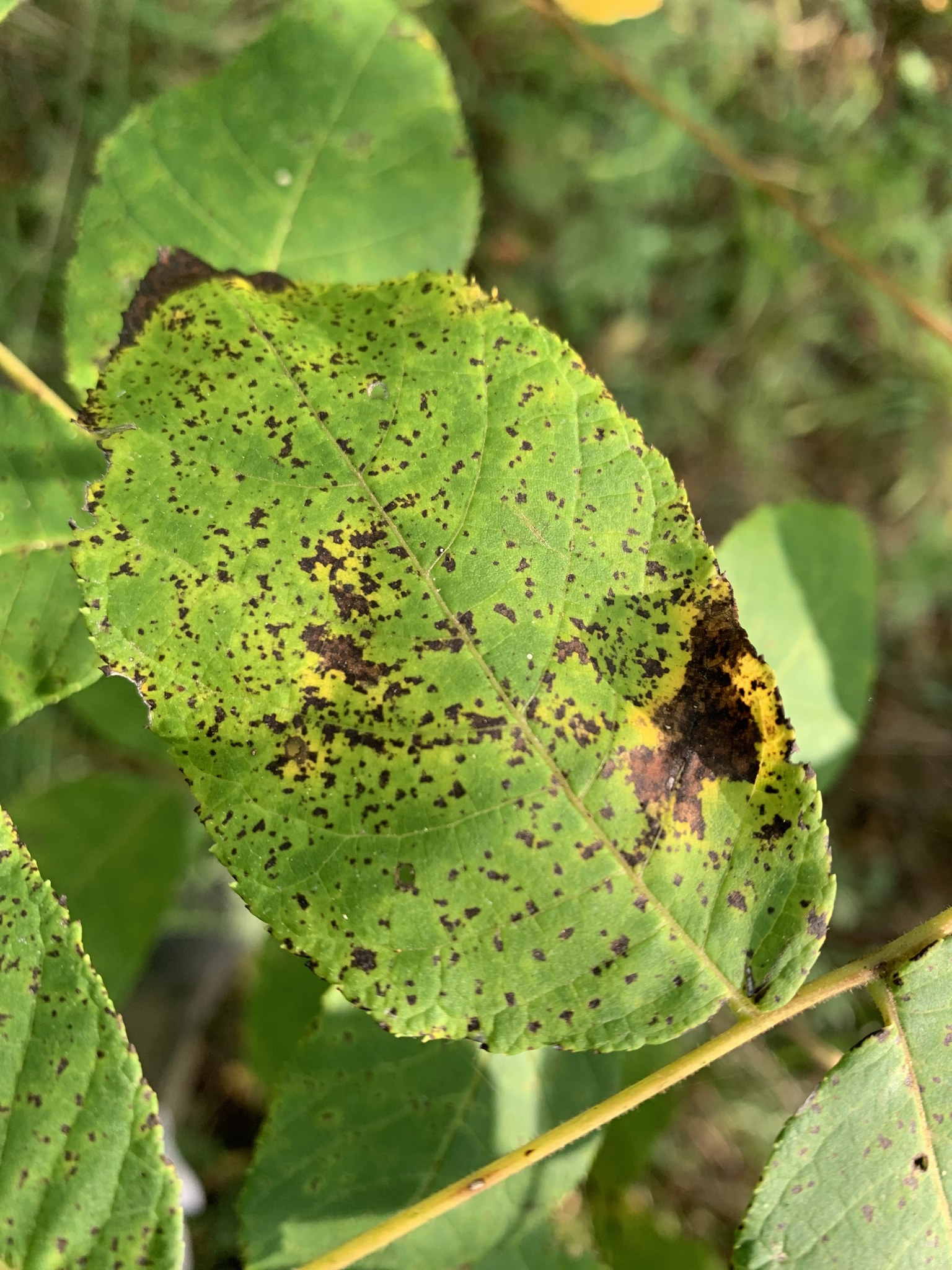
- Ophiognomonia leptostyla on Juglans nigra

Scientific classification
- Kingdom: Fungi
- Division: Ascomycota
- Class: Sordariomycetes
- Order: Diaporthales
- Family: Gnomoniaceae
- Genus: Ophiognomonia (Sacc.) Sacc.

Type species
- Ophiognomonia melanostyla (DC.) Sacc.

= Ophiognomonia =

Genus of fungi

Ophiognomonia is a genus of fungi in the family Gnomoniaceae.

The genus Ophiognomonia was based on Gnomoniella subgenus Ophiognomonia Sacc. for species having elongate, often septate ascospores. The type species, O. melanostyla (DC.: Fr.) Sacc., occurs on overwintered leaves and petioles of Tilia spp. in temperate regions. About 15 additional species are currently included in this genus but most of these are obscure. Two of these species are known as endophytes of woody plants, O. cryptica D. Wilson & M.E. Barr isolated from leaves of Quercus emoryi and O. elasticae (Koord.) M. Monod on Ficus. Although O. cryptica is a dominant endophyte with interesting ecological implications, no living isolates of this species have been preserved.

== Species ==
- O. alni-cordatae
- O. alni-viridis
- O. apiospora
- O. asiatica
- O. balsamiferae
- O. bugabensis
- O. clavigignenti-juglandacearum
- O. cordicarpa
- O. gardiennetii
- O. gei
- O. gei-montani
- O. gunmensis
- O. hiawathae
- O. ibarakiensis
- O. intermedia
- O. ischnostyla
- O. japonica
- O. kobayashii
- O. lenticulispora
- O. leptostyla
- O. longispora
- O. maximowiczianae
- O. melanostyla
- O. michiganensis
- O. micromegala
- O. monticola
- O. multirostrata
- O. naganoensis
- O. nana
- O. nipponicae
- O. ostryae-virginianae
- O. otanii
- O. padicola
- O. pseudoclavulata
- O. pseudoischnostyla
- O. pterocaryae
- O. quercus-gambellii
- O. rosae
- O. rubi-idaei
- O. sassafras
- O. setacea
- O. sogonovii
- O. trientensis
- O. tucumanensis
- O. vasiljevae
