= Geothermobacterium ferrireducens =

Scientific classification
- Domain: Bacteria
- Kingdom: Pseudomonadati
- Phylum: Thermodesulfobacteriota
- Class: Thermodesulfobacteria
- Order: Thermodesulfobacteriales
- Family: Thermodesulfobacteriaceae
- Genus: Geothermobacterium
- Species: G. ferrireducens

Binomial name
- Geothermobacterium ferrireducens Kashefi et al. 2002

Species of hyperthermophilic bacterium

Geothermobacterium ferrireducens is a species of hyperthermophilic thermodesulfobacterium discovered and known exclusively from Obsidian Pool in Yellowstone National Park, Wyoming. Its name comes from the Latin ferrum, meaning Iron, and reducens, meaning conversion to a different state. The bacteria are gram-negative rods, and move using a single flagellum. They live in high temperatures, between 65 and 100 °C, with 85 to 90 degrees being the optimum range- the highest optimum temperature range of any member of the phylum Bacteria. They are roughly 0.5 μm by 1.1 μm. They have an unusual biology: they do not require organic carbon for growth, instead growing by coupling hydrogen oxidation with a form of Fe(III) oxide reduction.

== See also ==
- List of bacterial orders
- List of bacteria genera
