= Xanthobacter sp. SoF1 =

Scientific classification
- Domain: Bacteria
- Kingdom: Pseudomonadati
- Phylum: Pseudomonadota
- Class: Alphaproteobacteria
- Order: Hyphomicrobiales
- Family: Xanthobacteraceae
- Genus: Xanthobacter
- Species: X. sp. SoF1

Binomial name
- Xanthobacter sp. SoF1

Synonyms
- X. sp. VTT-E-193585; X. sp. DSM 34079

Hydrogen-oxidising bacteria

Xanthobacter sp. SoF1 (SoF1) is a strain of hydrogen-oxidizing bacteria. SoF1 uses hydrogen and carbon dioxide as its sole energy and carbon sources, respectively, and is cultivated using industrial scale bioprocesses to produce a high protein content biomass for food purposes. Using renewable energy to perform electrolysis for H_{2} production, particularly solar energy, the energy-to-biomass efficiency of hydrogen oxidising bacteria cultivation can exceed to a level beyond plants.

It is taxonomically closest to Xanthobacter tagetidis DSM 11105 but represents a new, unnamed species. The EFSA evalulation as well as Solar Foods' redacted dossier for this strain are available online. The whole genome has been sequenced but is not public.

== Natural history ==
SoF1 was discovered in the Baltic Sea by Finnish researchers.

SoF1 is a gram-negative, chemoautotrophic, hydrogen-oxidizing bacteria from the genus Xanthobacter and family Xanthobacteraceae. They derive their energy from chemical reactions, using hydrogen gas as an energy source and electron donor, oxygen as an electron acceptor, ammonia as a nitrogen source and carbon dioxide as a carbon source. Through this process they are able to fix carbon dioxide into new cellular material.

== Use ==
Dried cell mass of these bacteria are high in protein, characterised by an amino acid profile more similar to high-quality animal protein than vegetable proteins. For this purpose, bacteria can be grown in a stirred reactor on the basis of the supply of H_{2}, O_{2}, CO_{2} and NH_{3}. The hydrogen gas can be acquired by electrolysis, powered by solar or wind energy.

== Commercial production ==
In a commercial production context, SoF1 is grown in a bioreactor. The bacteria grow autotrophically using only CO_{2} as their carbon source. In order to do this, they use H_{2} as an electron donor and O_{2} as an electron acceptor to fix CO_{2} and build up their biomass; this is the Calvin cycle. Both CO_{2} and water (hydrogen source) are directly collected from the air. The collected water is split into hydrogen and oxygen gases through electrolysis.

The organism requires a nitrogen source and several feed media containing minerals, such as phosphate, potassium, sodium and iron. The exact composition of the growing media is patented.

When harvested, the cell broth is heat-inactivated inside a closed system, and the solid material is concentrated by centrifugation. The resulting concentrate is then further processed by high-pressure homogenization and finally dried by heat evaporation.

The advantage of using SoF1 is that it requires a limited amount of water and land surface compared to traditional agriculture for plant protein production; even less compared to animal protein production. It also requires less energy, as electricity is only needed for electrolysis, air capture and processing.

It is estimated that with hydrogen-oxidising bacteria, there is a production of several times more protein per unit of land while using only about one-tenth of the water needed for soybean cultivation. Furthermore, it is estimated that the production of 1 kilogram of microbial protein would require 18.26 kWh of energy supply.
