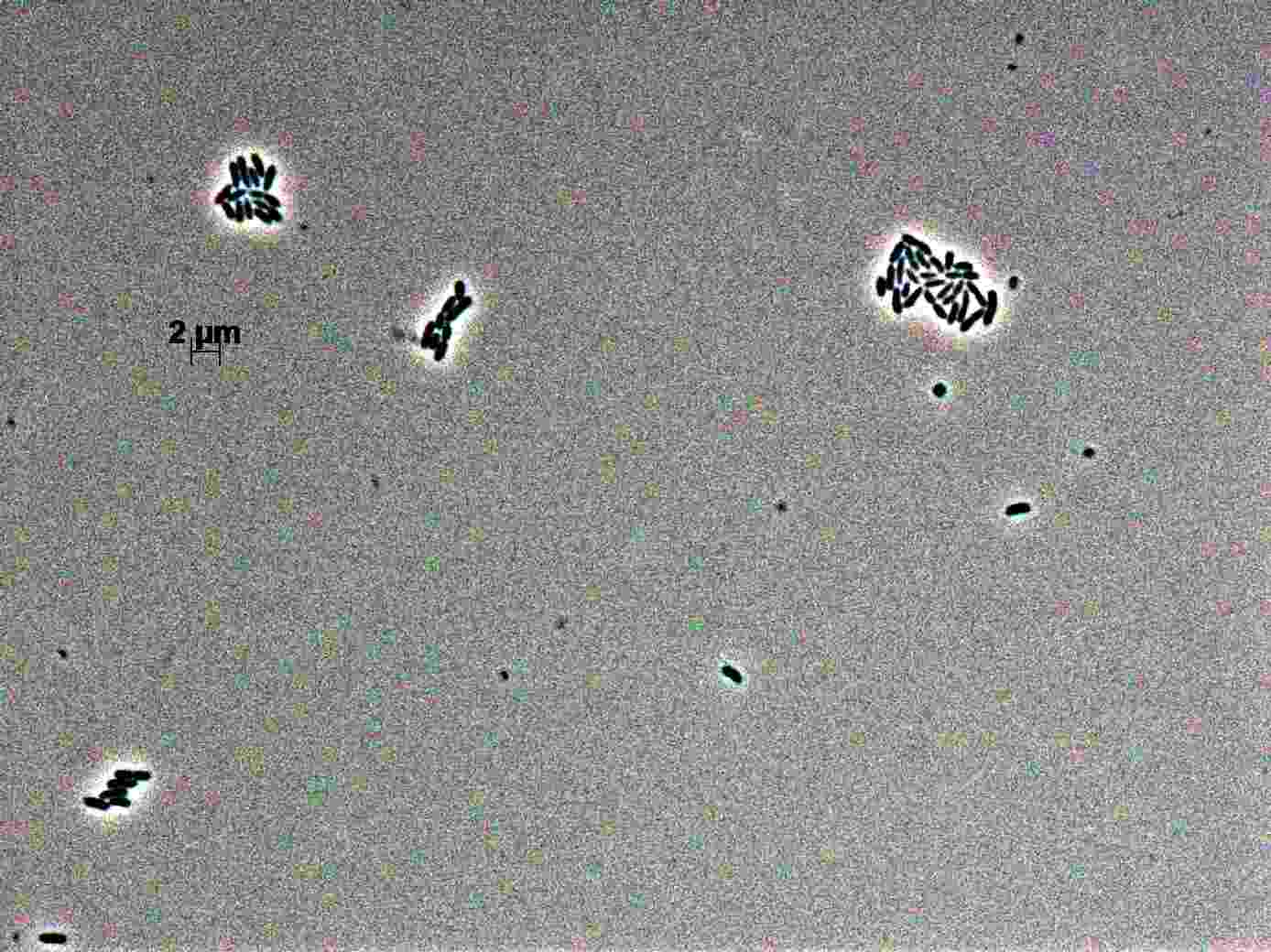
- Thermodesulfobacterium hveragerdense

Scientific classification
- Domain: Bacteria
- Kingdom: Pseudomonadati
- Phylum: Thermodesulfobacteriota
- Class: Thermodesulfobacteria
- Order: Thermodesulfobacteriales
- Family: Thermodesulfobacteriaceae
- Genus: Thermodesulfobacterium
- Species: T. hveragerdense

Binomial name
- Thermodesulfobacterium hveragerdense Sonne-Hansen and Ahring 2000

= Thermodesulfobacterium hveragerdense =

Species of bacterium

Thermodesulfobacterium hveragerdense is a bacterial species belonging to genus Thermodesulfobacterium, which are thermophilic sulfate-reducing bacteria. This species is found in aquatic areas of high temperature, and lives in freshwater like most, but not all Thermodesulfobacterium species It was first isolated from hotsprings in Iceland.

== Habitat ==
Thermodesulfobacterium hveragerdense is a thermophile, which means that it thrives at high temperatures. It is found in aquatic niches where the temperature is very high and where there is an abundance of sulfur deposits. Thus, they are found in or near volcanic hot springs that are slightly acidic. Thermodesulfobacterium hveragerdense is capable of growing in temperatures that range from 55 °C to 74 °C (131 °F to 166 °C), but their optimal growth temperature is 70-74 °C. Thermodesulfobacterium hveragerdense thrives in slightly acidic pH levels, with the optimal pH for growth being 6.5-7.0.

== Cell morphology ==
Thermodesulfobacterium hveragerdense inhabits bacterial mats and, hence, it lacks a flagellum for mobility. The cell is cylindrical, its dimensions being 2.5μm × 0.5μm. This roughly equates to a cell body volume of 1.96 μm^{3}. The cells form chains of up to three cells long, rarely exceeding this number.

== Cell membrane ==
Thermodesulfobacterium hveragerdense has a phospholipid bilayer membrane. The lipids of the membrane are mainly dietherglycerophospholipids(DEG-P), but there are also many diacylglycerophospholipids(DAG-P) and acyl/etherglycerophospholipids(AEG-P) in the lipid bilayer as well. The bilayer also contains minute amounts of diphosphatidylglycerol (DPG) compounds in it, mainly phosphatidylethanolamine, phosphatidylinositol, and aminopentanetetral.

== Metabolism ==
Thermodesulfobacterium hveragerdense is not an anaerobic organotrophic organism, which means that it relies on organic substances for nutrition and it does not require oxygen. Thermodesulfobacterium hveragerdense is a sulfur-reducing bacteria. It utilizes sulfate (SO_{4}^{−2}) as electron acceptors, and thiosulfate and sulfite as electron donors. The reducing of sulfur and the elimination the oxygen, yields hydrogen sulfide(H_{2}S). Hydrogen sulfide is responsible for what is referred to as rotten egg smell.

== Genome ==
The genome of Thermodesulfobacterium hveragerdense, has been sequenced via whole genome shotgun sequencing. The genome consists of 1.7 million base pairs(Mbp), and contained a total of 1,810 genes. Specific information about the genome is listed below:

Genome Size: 1,726,173 base pairs

Total Genes: 1,810 genes

Coding Genes: 1,696 genes

Coding Sequences: 1,758 sequences

Protein Coding Sequences: 1,696 sequences

RNA Genes: 52 RNA genes

rRNAs: 1 5s rRNA, 1 16s rRNA, 1 23S rRNA

5s rRNA: This rRNA is important for ribosomal structure stabilization during protein synthesis, which actually enhances protein synthesis. This also helps determine the phylogenetic trees of many organisms
16s rRNA: This rRNA is used for phylogenetic purposes, because the function of this gene has not changed over time, it is present in most bacteria, and the sequence is large enough to informatic purposes as well.
23s rRNA: This rRNA is very important in the process of binding tRNA to ribosomal functional sites.

tRNAs: 46 tRNAs

ncRNAs: 3 ncRNAs

Pseudogenes: 62 pseudo genes
