= Ancylobacter sonchi =

Scientific classification
- Domain: Bacteria
- Kingdom: Pseudomonadati
- Phylum: Pseudomonadota
- Class: Alphaproteobacteria
- Order: Hyphomicrobiales
- Family: Xanthobacteraceae
- Genus: Ancylobacter
- Species: A. sonchi

Binomial name
- Ancylobacter sonchi Agafonova, 2017

Species of bacterium

Ancylobacter sonchi is a bacterial species in the family Xanthobacteraceae.

== Discovery ==
Ancylobacter sonchi was first isolated from the rhizoshpere of Sonchus arvensis, commonly known as field sow thistle, in Pushchino, Moscow.

== Description ==
Ancylobacter sonchi is rod-shaped, with widths of 0.4-.0.5 µm and lengths of 0.6-1.0 µm. When grown on methanol mineral salts medium, colonies appear white, shiny, opaque, and convex. When grown on R2A agar, colonies appear yellow, translucent, and glossy. It is gram-negative, strictly aerobic, and motile. It grows at temperatures of 10-30°C, with optimal growth at temperatures of 22-29°C. It grows at pH levels of 6.0-9.0. It is capable of using many common sugars for growth, including glucose, arabinose, xylose, and fructose. It is catalase-, oxidase-, and urease-positive.

== Phylogeny ==
Within Ancylobacter, A. sonchi is believed to be most closely related to A. defluvii and A. pratisalsi.
