= Xanthobacter agilis =

Scientific classification
- Domain: Bacteria
- Kingdom: Pseudomonadati
- Phylum: Pseudomonadota
- Class: Alphaproteobacteria
- Order: Hyphomicrobiales
- Family: Xanthobacteraceae
- Genus: Xanthobacter
- Species: X. agilis

Binomial name
- Xanthobacter agilis Jenni and Aragno 1988

Type strain
- Aragno SA35, ATCC 43847, DSM 3770, Jenni SA35, LMG 16336, LMG 7994, NCAIM B.01949, NCIMB 12683, NEU 2015, SA35, VKM B-2105

Species of bacterium

Xanthobacter agilis is a dinitrogen-fixing, non-pleomorphic hydrogen-oxidizing and motile bacteria from the family of Xanthobacteraceae which has been isolated from a lake near Neuchâtel in Switzerland. Xanthobacter agilis produces o-phthalyl amidase.
