= Ancylobacter =

Scientific classification
- Domain: Bacteria
- Kingdom: Pseudomonadati
- Phylum: Pseudomonadota
- Class: Alphaproteobacteria
- Order: Hyphomicrobiales
- Family: Xanthobacteraceae
- Genus: Ancylobacter; Raj 1983

Type species
- Ancylobacter aquaticus

Species
- "Ancylobacter abiegnus" Zaichikova et al. 2010; Ancylobacter aquaticus (Ørskov 1928) Raj 1983; Ancylobacter defluvii Poroshina et al. 2014; Ancylobacter dichloromethanicus Firsova et al. 2010; Ancylobacter lacus Chemodurova et al. 2020; "Ancylobacter natronum" Doronina et al. 2001; Ancylobacter oerskovii Lang et al. 2008; Ancylobacter plantiphilus Chemodurova et al. 2020; Ancylobacter polymorphus Xin et al. 2006; Ancylobacter pratisalsi Suarez et al. 2017; Ancylobacter rudongensis Xin et al. 2004; Ancylobacter sonchi Agafonova et al. 2017; Ancylobacter vacuolatus Xin et al. 2006

Synonyms
- Renobacter Nikitin 1971; Microcyclus Ørskov 1928 (Approved Lists 1980)

Genus of bacteria

Ancylobacter is a genus of aerobic bacteria in the family Xanthobacteraceae.

== Phylogeny ==
The currently accepted taxonomy is based on the List of Prokaryotic names with Standing in Nomenclature (LPSN). The phylogeny is based on whole-genome analysis.

- - Ancylobacter
    - - - - Ancylobacter sonchi
          - Ancylobacter defluvii
        - Ancylobacter pratisalsi
      - - - Ancylobacter vacuolatus
          - - Ancylobacter aquaticus
            - - Ancylobacter polymorphus
              - Ancylobacter dichloromethanicus
        - Ancylobacter rudongensis
    - Ancylobacter oerskovii
  - outgroups
    - - Methylorhabdus
      - Angulomicrobium
    - Starkeya
