= Doebereinerae =

Doebereinerae may refer to:

- Azorhizobium doebereinerae, species of bacteria
- Azospirillum doebereinerae, species of bacteria
- Beijerinckia doebereinerae, species of bacteria
