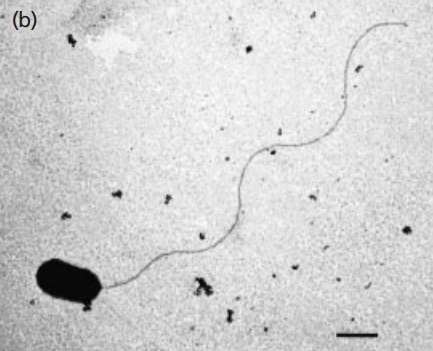
- Thermodesulfobacterium hydrogeniphilum

Scientific classification
- Domain: Bacteria
- Kingdom: Pseudomonadati
- Phylum: Thermodesulfobacteriota
- Class: Thermodesulfobacteria
- Order: Thermodesulfobacteriales
- Family: Thermodesulfobacteriaceae
- Genus: Thermodesulfobacterium
- Species: T. hydrogeniphilum

Binomial name
- Thermodesulfobacterium hydrogeniphilum Jeanthon et al. 2002

= Thermodesulfobacterium hydrogeniphilum =

Species of bacterium

Thermodesulfobacterium hydrogeniphilum is a species of Sulfate-reducing bacteria. It is thermophilic, chemolithoautotrophic, non-spore-forming, marine species, with type strain SL6^{T} (=DSM 14290^{T} =JCM 11239^{T}).
