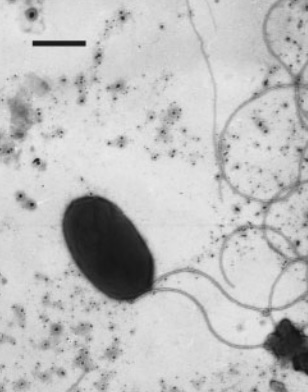
- Caldimicrobium rimae

Scientific classification
- Domain: Bacteria
- Kingdom: Pseudomonadati
- Phylum: Thermodesulfobacteriota
- Class: Thermodesulfobacteria
- Order: Thermodesulfobacteriales
- Family: Thermodesulfobacteriaceae
- Genus: Caldimicrobium; Miroshnichenko et al. 2009

Type species
- Caldimicrobium rimae Miroshnichenko et al. 2009

Species
- C. rimae; C. thiodismutans

Synonyms
- "Caldus"; "Thermosulfurisoma"

= Caldimicrobium =

Genus of bacteria

Caldimicrobium is a genus of bacteria from the family Thermodesulfobacteriaceae.

Caldimicrobium is an anaerobic thermophile which is roughly 1.0–1.2 micrometers long and 0.5 micrometers wide.

== Phylogeny ==
The currently accepted taxonomy is based on the List of Prokaryotic names with Standing in Nomenclature (LPSN) and National Center for Biotechnology Information (NCBI).

16S rRNA based LTP_10_2024

- Thermodesulfobacteriaceae
  - Thermosulfurimonas
  - - Caldimicrobium rimae Miroshnichenko et al. 2009
    - - Caldimicrobium thiodismutans Kojima, Umezawa & Fukui 2016
      - Thermodesulfobacterium

120 marker proteins based GTDB 10-RS226

- Thermodesulfobacteriaceae
  - Thermosulfurimonas
  - - Caldimicrobium thiodismutans
    - Thermodesulfobacterium
