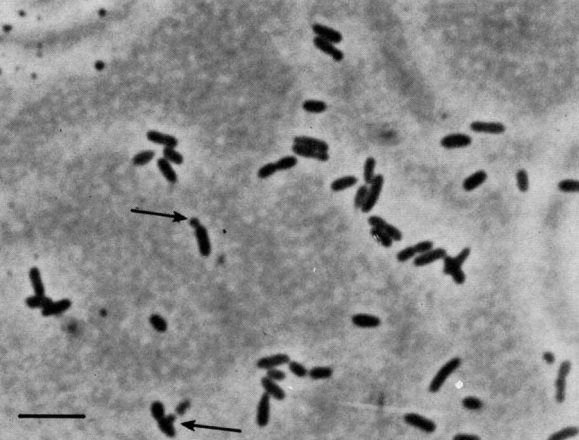
- Thermodesulfobacterium commune

Scientific classification
- Domain: Bacteria
- Kingdom: Pseudomonadati
- Phylum: Thermodesulfobacteriota
- Class: Thermodesulfobacteria
- Order: Thermodesulfobacteriales
- Family: Thermodesulfobacteriaceae
- Genus: Thermodesulfobacterium
- Species: T. commune

Binomial name
- Thermodesulfobacterium commune Zeikus et al. 1983

= Thermodesulfobacterium commune =

Species of bacterium

Thermodesulfobacterium commune is a species of sulfate-reducing bacteria. It is small, Gram-negative, straight rod-shaped, and obligately anaerobic, and has an optimum growth temperature of 70 °C (158 °F). Its type strain is YSRA-1.
