= Xanthobacter viscosus =

Scientific classification
- Domain: Bacteria
- Kingdom: Pseudomonadati
- Phylum: Pseudomonadota
- Class: Alphaproteobacteria
- Order: Hyphomicrobiales
- Family: Xanthobacteraceae
- Genus: Xanthobacter
- Species: X. viscosus

Binomial name
- Xanthobacter viscosus Doronina and Trotsenko 2003

Type strain
- 7D, ATCC BAA-298, CIP 108462, INMI, KCTC 12306, VKM B-2253

Synonyms
- Blastobacter viscosus

Species of bacterium

Xanthobacter viscosus is a bacterium from the family of Xanthobacteraceae which has been isolated from activated sludge in Russia.
