= Starkeya novella =

Scientific classification
- Domain: Bacteria
- Kingdom: Pseudomonadati
- Phylum: Pseudomonadota
- Class: Alphaproteobacteria
- Order: Hyphomicrobiales
- Family: Xanthobacteraceae
- Genus: Starkeya
- Species: S. novella

Binomial name
- Starkeya novella Kelly et al. 2000

Type strain
- ATCC 8093, BCRC 13031, BCRC 17550, CCM 1077, CCRC 13031, CCRC 17550, CIP 104402, CIP 106821, DSM 506, IAM 12100, IFO 12443, IFO 14993, JCM 20403, KCTC 2845, LMD 38.19, LMD 81.75, NBRC 12443, NBRC 14993, NCCB 38019, NCCB 81075, NCIB 10456, NCIB 9113, NCIM 2858, NCIMB 10456, NCIMB 9113, THI 031

Synonyms
- Thiobacillus novellus

Species of bacterium

Starkeya novella is a chemolithoautotrophic and methylotrophic bacteria from the family Xanthobacteraceae which has been isolated from soil. Starkeya novella has the ability to oxidise thiosulfate. The complete genome of Starkeya novella is sequenced.
