= Labrys soli =

Scientific classification
- Domain: Bacteria
- Kingdom: Pseudomonadati
- Phylum: Pseudomonadota
- Class: Alphaproteobacteria
- Order: Hyphomicrobiales
- Family: Xanthobacteraceae
- Genus: Labrys
- Species: L. soli

Binomial name
- Labrys soli Nguyen et al. 2015

Type strain
- DCY64^{T}

Species of bacterium

Labrys soli is a Gram-negative, strictly aerobic, non-motile, non-spore-forming bacteria from the family Xanthobacteraceae which has been isolated from the rhizosphere of a ginseng plant.
