= Aquabacter spiritensis =

Scientific classification
- Domain: Bacteria
- Kingdom: Pseudomonadati
- Phylum: Pseudomonadota
- Class: Alphaproteobacteria
- Order: Hyphomicrobiales
- Family: Xanthobacteraceae
- Genus: Aquabacter
- Species: A. spiritensis

Binomial name
- Aquabacter spiritensis Irgens et al. 1993

Type strain
- ATCC 43981, DSM 9035, LMG 8611, SPL-1

Species of bacterium

Aquabacter spiritensis is a bacterium from the genus of Aquabacter which was isolated from the Spirit Lake in Washington in the United States.
