= Ancylobacter oerskovii =

Scientific classification
- Domain: Bacteria
- Kingdom: Pseudomonadati
- Phylum: Pseudomonadota
- Class: Alphaproteobacteria
- Order: Hyphomicrobiales
- Family: Xanthobacteraceae
- Genus: Ancylobacter
- Species: A. oerskovii

Binomial name
- Ancylobacter oerskovii Lang et al. 2008

Type strain
- CCM 7435, DSM 18746, NS05

Synonyms
- Ancylobacter oxalaticus

Species of bacterium

Ancylobacter oerskovii is a Gram-negative, pleomorphic, rod-shaped, non-spore-forming bacteria from the family Xanthobacteraceae which has been isolated from soil from Muğla in Turkey. Ancylobacter oerskovii has the ability to utilize oxalic acid.
