= Azorhizobium oxalatiphilum =

Scientific classification
- Domain: Bacteria
- Kingdom: Pseudomonadati
- Phylum: Pseudomonadota
- Class: Alphaproteobacteria
- Order: Hyphomicrobiales
- Family: Xanthobacteraceae
- Genus: Azorhizobium
- Species: A. oxalatiphilum

Binomial name
- Azorhizobium oxalatiphilum Lang et al. 2013

Type strain
- CCM 7897, DSM 18749, NS12

Species of bacterium

Azorhizobium oxalatiphilum is a Gram-negative, motile, non-spore-forming bacteria from the family Xanthobacteraceae which has been isolated from petioles of the plant Rumex in Muğla in Turkey. Azorhizobium oxalatiphilum has the ability to utilizes oxalic acid.
