= L-arabinonolactonase =

Class of enzymes

Identifiers
- EC no.: 3.1.1.15
- CAS no.: 9025-95-0

Databases
- BRENDA: enzyme data
- ExPASy: NiceZyme view
- KEGG: enzyme entry
- MetaCyc: metabolic pathway
- Rhea: reactions
- PDB structures: RCSB PDB PDBe PDBsum
- Gene Ontology: AmiGO / QuickGO
Search
- PMC: articles
- PubMed: articles
- NCBI: proteins

L-arabinonolactonase (EC 3.1.1.15) is an enzyme that catalyzes the reaction

L-arabinono-1,4-lactone
H_{2}O
L-arabinonic acid

The enzyme characterised from Pseudomonas saccharophila hydrolyses L-arabinono-1,4-lactone to give L-arabinonic acid. The reaction is part of a sequence that converts arabinose to α-ketoglutaric acid. It has also been found in Rhizobium species. A crystal structure has been determined.

This enzyme is a hydrolase, specifically one acting on carboxylic ester bonds. The systematic name is L-arabinono-1,4-lactone lactonohydrolase.
