= Azospirillum oryzae =

Scientific classification
- Domain: Bacteria
- Kingdom: Pseudomonadati
- Phylum: Pseudomonadota
- Class: Alphaproteobacteria
- Order: Rhodospirillales
- Family: Azospirillaceae
- Genus: Azospirillum
- Species: A. oryzae

Binomial name
- Azospirillum oryzae Xie and Yokota 2005

Species of bacterium

Azospirillum oryzae is a species of nitrogen-fixing bacteria associated with the roots of Oryza sativa. Its type strain is COC8^{T} (=IAM 15130^{T} =CCTCC AB204051^{T}).
