= Labrys wisconsinensis =

Scientific classification
- Domain: Bacteria
- Kingdom: Pseudomonadati
- Phylum: Pseudomonadota
- Class: Alphaproteobacteria
- Order: Hyphomicrobiales
- Family: Xanthobacteraceae
- Genus: Labrys
- Species: L. wisconsinensis

Binomial name
- Labrys wisconsinensis Carvalho et al. 2008

Type strain
- DSM 19619, NRRL B-51088, W1215-PCA4

Species of bacterium

Labrys wisconsinensis is a facultatively anaerobic bacterium from the family Xanthobacteraceae, which has been isolated from a water sample from the Lake Michigan in Wisconsin in the United States.
