= Azospirillum canadense =

Scientific classification
- Domain: Bacteria
- Kingdom: Pseudomonadati
- Phylum: Pseudomonadota
- Class: Alphaproteobacteria
- Order: Rhodospirillales
- Family: Azospirillaceae
- Genus: Azospirillum
- Species: A. canadense

Binomial name
- Azospirillum canadense Mehnaz et al. 2007

Species of bacterium

Azospirillum canadense is a nitrogen-fixing bacterium isolated from corn rhizospheres. Its type strain is DS2^{T} (=NCCB 100108^{T} =LMG 23617^{T}).
