= D-arabinonolactonase =

Class of enzymes

Identifiers
- EC no.: 3.1.1.30
- CAS no.: 37278-44-7

Databases
- BRENDA: enzyme data
- ExPASy: NiceZyme view
- KEGG: enzyme entry
- MetaCyc: metabolic pathway
- Rhea: reactions
- PDB structures: RCSB PDB PDBe PDBsum
- Gene Ontology: AmiGO / QuickGO
Search
- PMC: articles
- PubMed: articles
- NCBI: proteins

D-arabinonolactonase (EC 3.1.1.30) is an enzyme that catalyzes the reaction

D-arabinono-1,4-lactone
H_{2}O
D-arabinonic acid

The enzyme characterised from Pseudomonas saccharophila hydrolyses D-arabinono-1,4-lactone to D-arabinonic acid. The enzyme has been studied for applications in organic synthesis.

This enzyme is a hydrolase, specifically one acting on carboxylic ester bonds. The systematic name is D-arabinono-1,4-lactone lactonohydrolase.
