= Alkene monooxygenase =

Class of enzymes

Identifiers
- EC no.: 1.14.13.69

Databases
- IntEnz: IntEnz view
- BRENDA: BRENDA entry
- ExPASy: NiceZyme view
- KEGG: KEGG entry
- MetaCyc: metabolic pathway
- PRIAM: profile
- PDB structures: RCSB PDB PDBe PDBsum
- Gene Ontology: AmiGO / QuickGO
Search
- PMC: articles
- PubMed: articles
- NCBI: proteins

Alkene monooxygenase (EC 1.14.13.69) is an enzyme that catalyzes the chemical reaction

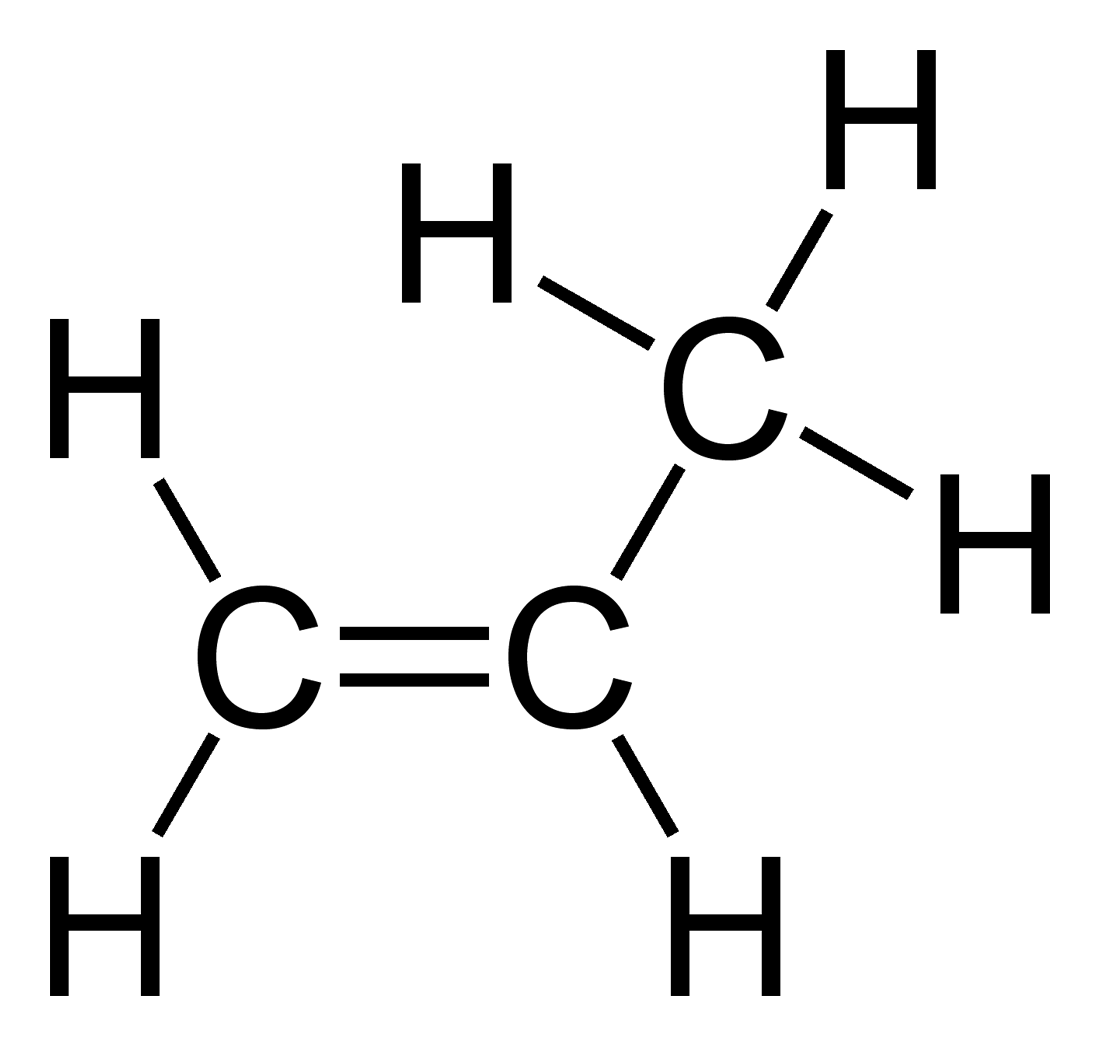
propylene
+ NADH + H^{+}
O_{2}
H_{2}O
propylene oxide
+ NAD^{+}

The four substrates of this enzyme are propylene, reduced nicotinamide adenine dinucleotide (NADH), oxygen, and a proton. Its products are propylene oxide, oxidised NAD^{+}, and water.

This enzyme is an oxidoreductase, acting on paired donors, with molecular oxygen as oxidant and incorporating one of its atoms. The systematic name of this enzyme class is alkene,NADH:oxygen oxidoreductase. This enzyme is also called alkene epoxygenase. It contains a Rieske type of ferredoxin.

== Substrate range ==
The enzyme from a Xanthobacter bacterial species has four peptide components, all of which are required for activity. These oxidise a large range of double bonds, including internal or terminal alkenes and chlorinated derivatives.

When propene is the substrate, the epoxide product is 95% the (R) enantiomer.
