= Inquilinus limosus =

Scientific classification
- Domain: Bacteria
- Kingdom: Pseudomonadati
- Phylum: Pseudomonadota
- Class: Alphaproteobacteria
- Order: Rhodospirillales
- Family: Azospirillaceae
- Genus: Inquilinus
- Species: I. limosus

Binomial name
- Inquilinus limosus Coenye et al. 2002

Species of bacterium

Inquilinus limosus is a bacterium first isolated from cystic fibrosis patients' lungs, and is rarely observed elsewhere, prompting extensive research into its biology.
