= Angulomicrobium amanitiforme =

Scientific classification
- Domain: Bacteria
- Kingdom: Pseudomonadati
- Phylum: Pseudomonadota
- Class: Alphaproteobacteria
- Order: Hyphomicrobiales
- Family: Xanthobacteraceae
- Genus: Angulomicrobium
- Species: A. amanitiforme

Binomial name
- Angulomicrobium amanitiforme Fritz et al. 2004

Type strain
- CIP 108770, DSM 15561, NCIMB 1785

Species of bacterium

Angulomicrobium amanitiforme is a bacterium from the genus Angulomicrobium which was isolated from a fresh water pond in the United Kingdom.
