= Labrys monachus =

Scientific classification
- Domain: Bacteria
- Kingdom: Pseudomonadati
- Phylum: Pseudomonadota
- Class: Alphaproteobacteria
- Order: Hyphomicrobiales
- Family: Xanthobacteraceae
- Genus: Labrys
- Species: L. monachus

Binomial name
- Labrys monachus corrig. Vasilyeva and Semenov 1985

Type strain
- ATCC 43932, DSM 5896, IAM 15350, JCM 21795, strain 42, VKM B-1479, VKM-B1479

Synonyms
- Labrys monahos Vasilyeva and Semenov 1985

Species of bacterium

Labrys monachus is a bacterium which was isolated from silt from Lake Mustijary in Estonia.
