= Azospirillum halopraeferens =

Scientific classification
- Domain: Bacteria
- Kingdom: Pseudomonadati
- Phylum: Pseudomonadota
- Class: Alphaproteobacteria
- Order: Rhodospirillales
- Family: Azospirillaceae
- Genus: Azospirillum
- Species: A. halopraeferens

Binomial name
- Azospirillum halopraeferens Reinhold et al., 1987

Species of bacterium

Azospirillum halopraeferens is a species of nitrogen-fixing bacteria associated with the roots of Diplachne fusca and black mangrove. It is microaerophilic and its type strain is Au 4 (= LMG 7108 =DSM 3675).
