= Labrys portucalensis =

Scientific classification
- Domain: Bacteria
- Kingdom: Pseudomonadati
- Phylum: Pseudomonadota
- Class: Alphaproteobacteria
- Order: Hyphomicrobiales
- Family: Xanthobacteraceae
- Genus: Labrys
- Species: L. portucalensis

Binomial name
- Labrys portucalensis Carvalho et al. 2008

Type strain
- De Marco F11, DSM 17916, F11, LMG 23412

Species of bacterium

Labrys portucalensis is a Gram-negative, rod-shaped, non-motile, non-spore-forming and aerobic bacteria from the family Xanthobacteraceae which has been isolated from polluted soil in Estarreja in Portugal. Labrys portucalensis has the ability to degrade fluorobenzene.
