= Methylorhabdus multivorans =

Scientific classification
- Domain: Bacteria
- Kingdom: Pseudomonadati
- Phylum: Pseudomonadota
- Class: Alphaproteobacteria
- Order: Hyphomicrobiales
- Family: Xanthobacteraceae
- Genus: Methylorhabdus
- Species: M. multivorans

Binomial name
- Methylorhabdus multivorans Doronina et al. 1996

Type strain
- ATCC 51890, CIP 104898, DM13, NCIMB 13571, VKM B-2030, VKMB-2030, AF004845

Species of bacterium

Methylorhabdus multivorans is a Gram-negative, aerobic, facultatively methylotrophic nonmotile bacterium from the genus Methylorhabdus. Methylorhabdus multivorans has been isolated from groundwater which was contaminated with dichloromethane in Switzerland.
