= Ancylobacter aquaticus =

Scientific classification
- Domain: Bacteria
- Kingdom: Pseudomonadati
- Phylum: Pseudomonadota
- Class: Alphaproteobacteria
- Order: Hyphomicrobiales
- Family: Xanthobacteraceae
- Genus: Ancylobacter
- Species: A. aquaticus

Binomial name
- Ancylobacter aquaticus Raj 1983

Type strain
- ATCC 25396, BCRC 17425, BUCSAV 410, CCM 1786, CCRC 17425, CCUG 1820, CCUG 30551, CECT 4166, CGMCC 1.2804, D. ClausT, DSM 101, DSMZ 101, H.D. Raj Mc-2, IAM 12364, JCM 20518, JCM 6888, LMG 4052, LMG 8809, Mc-2, NBRC 102453, NCIB 9271, NCIM 2119, NCIMB 1801, NCIMB 9271, NCMB 1801, Orskov, Orskov Mc-2, Raj Mc-2, rskov, strain Oerskov, VKM B-1287, Ørskov

Species of bacterium

Ancylobacter aquaticus is a bacterium from the family Xanthobacteraceae which has been isolated from lake water in Copenhagen in Denmark. Ancylobacter aquaticus can degrade 1,2-dichloroethane and produces haloalkane dehalogenase.
