= Ancylobacter dichloromethanicus =

Scientific classification
- Domain: Bacteria
- Kingdom: Pseudomonadati
- Phylum: Pseudomonadota
- Class: Alphaproteobacteria
- Order: Hyphomicrobiales
- Family: Xanthobacteraceae
- Genus: Ancylobacter
- Species: A. dichloromethanicus

Binomial name
- Ancylobacter dichloromethanicus Firsova et al. 2010

Type strain
- DM16, DSM 21507, VKM B-2484

Synonyms
- Ancylobacter dichloromethanicum

Species of bacterium

Ancylobacter dichloromethanicus is an aerobic, Gram-negative bacteria from the family Xanthobacteraceae which has been isolated from dichloromethane contaminated soil in Volgograd in Russia. Ancylobacter dichloromethanicus can use dichloromethane, methanol, formate and formaldehyde for its metabolism.
