= Labrys neptuniae =

Scientific classification
- Domain: Bacteria
- Kingdom: Pseudomonadati
- Phylum: Pseudomonadota
- Class: Alphaproteobacteria
- Order: Hyphomicrobiales
- Family: Xanthobacteraceae
- Genus: Labrys
- Species: L. neptuniae

Binomial name
- Labrys neptuniae Chou et al. 2007

Type strain
- BCRC 17578, CCRC 17578, Liujia-146, LMG 23578

Species of bacterium

Labrys neptuniae is a bacterium from the family Xanthobacteraceae which has been isolated from the root nodules from the plant Neptunia oleracea in Taiwan.
