= Azospirillum brasilense =

Scientific classification
- Domain: Bacteria
- Kingdom: Pseudomonadati
- Phylum: Pseudomonadota
- Class: Alphaproteobacteria
- Order: Rhodospirillales
- Family: Azospirillaceae
- Genus: Azospirillum
- Species: A. brasilense

Binomial name
- Azospirillum brasilense Tarrand, Krieg & Döbereiner, 1978

Species of bacterium

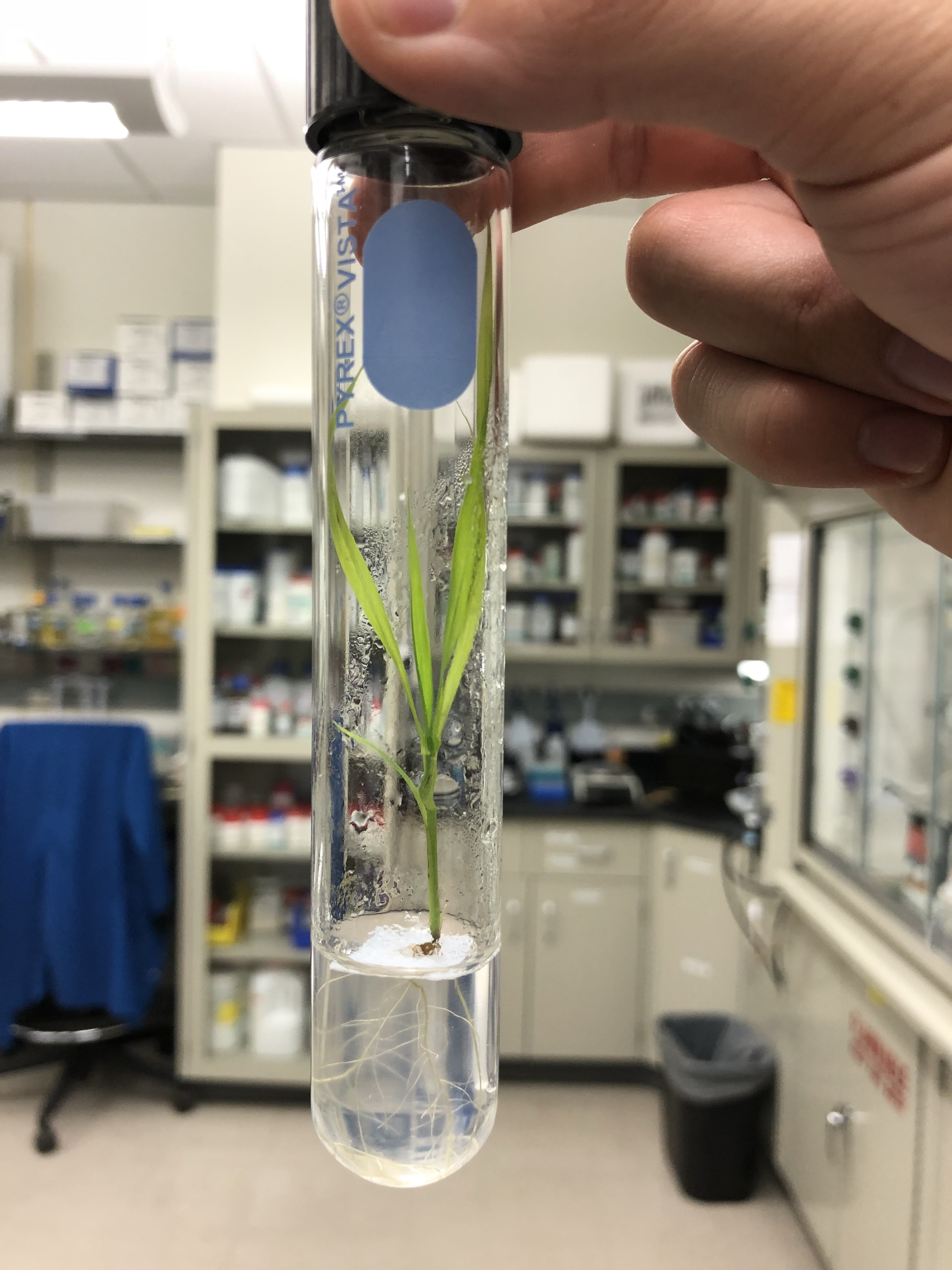
A. brasilense promoting the growth of Setaria viridis, a model plant for Zea mays (corn).

Azospirillum brasilense is a very well studied, nitrogen-fixing (diazotroph), genetically tractable, Gram-negative, alpha-proteobacterium bacterium, first described in Brazil (in a publication in 1978) by the group of Johanna Döbereiner and then receiving the name "brasilense". A. brasilense is able to fix nitrogen in the presence of low oxygen levels, making it a microaerobic diazotroph. An isolate from the genus Azospirillum was isolated from nitrogen poor soils in the Netherlands in 1925, however the species A. brasilense was first described in 1978 in Brazil, since this genus is widely found in the rhizospheres of grasses around the world where it confers plant growth promotion. Whether growth promotion occurs through direct nitrogen flux from the bacteria to the plant or through hormone regulation is debated. The two most commonly studied strains are Sp7 (ATCC 29145) and Sp245, both are Brazilian isolates isolated from Tropical grasses from Seropedica, Brazil.

The genome of A. brasilense Sp245 has been sequenced and is 7Mbp in size and spread across 7 chromosomes. The high GC content (70%) makes it challenging to engineer. Sp245 can be transformed with OriV origin of replication plasmids through conjugation and electroporation. The strain is natively resistant to both spectinomycin and ampicillin antibiotics. Kanamycin resistance is used as a selectable marker. A. brasilense has a high evolutionary adaptation rate driven by codon mutation and transposon hopping.

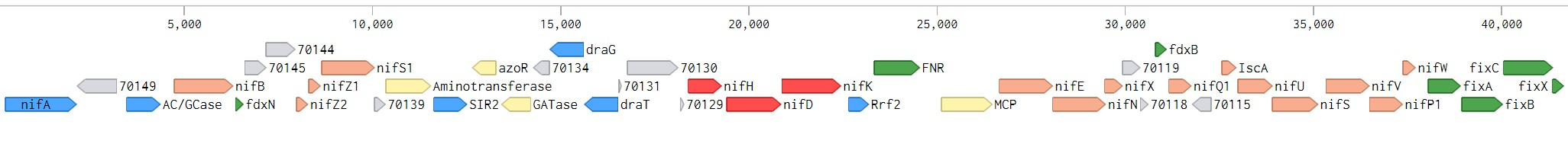
Annotated 42kbp genetic context of the nitrogenase genes in A. brasilense Sp245 compiled from raw sequencing data. There are a total of 45 genes, 26 of them annotated by homology, 8 putative functions, 11 completely unknown and no homologs.

A strain originally classified as Roseomonas fauriae was reclassified as A. brasilense. It was first isolated from a hand wound of a woman in Hawaii in 1971, and was named for Yvonne Faur "for her contributions to public health bacteriology and, specifically, for her contribution to the recognition of pink-pigmented bacteria."
