= Ancylobacter vacuolatus =

Scientific classification
- Domain: Bacteria
- Kingdom: Pseudomonadati
- Phylum: Pseudomonadota
- Class: Alphaproteobacteria
- Order: Hyphomicrobiales
- Family: Xanthobacteraceae
- Genus: Ancylobacter
- Species: A. vacuolatus

Binomial name
- Ancylobacter vacuolatus Xin et al. 2006

Type strain
- AS 1.176, AS 1.2807, CGMCC 1.2807, CIP 109300, DSM 1277, NCIMB 12000, NP-300, VKM B-1381

Synonyms Renobacter vacuolatum
- Renobacter vaculatum

Species of bacterium

Ancylobacter vacuolatus is a bacterium from the family Xanthobacteraceae which has been isolated from soil.
