= Xanthobacter aminoxidans =

Scientific classification
- Domain: Bacteria
- Kingdom: Pseudomonadati
- Phylum: Pseudomonadota
- Class: Alphaproteobacteria
- Order: Hyphomicrobiales
- Family: Xanthobacteraceae
- Genus: Xanthobacter
- Species: X. aminoxidans

Binomial name
- Xanthobacter aminoxidans Doronina and Trotsenko 2003

Type strain
- 14A, ATCC BAA-299, CIP 108461, DSM 15009, KCTC 12307, VKM B-2254

Synonyms
- Blastobacter aminooxidans, Xanthobacter aminooxidans

Species of bacterium

Xanthobacter aminoxidans is a bacterium from the family of Xanthobacteraceae which has been isolated from activated sludge in Russia.
