= Azospirillum lipoferum =

Scientific classification
- Domain: Bacteria
- Kingdom: Pseudomonadati
- Phylum: Pseudomonadota
- Class: Alphaproteobacteria
- Order: Rhodospirillales
- Family: Azospirillaceae
- Genus: Azospirillum
- Species: A. lipoferum

Binomial name
- Azospirillum lipoferum Reinhold (Beijerinck 1925) Tarrand et al. 1979 (Approved Lists 1980)

Synonyms
- "Spirillum lipoferum" Beijerinck 1925

Species of bacterium

Azospirillum lipoferum is a species of microaerophilic, gram-negative, rod-shaped, nitrogen-fixing bacteria. They are currently most notable for the ability to enhance the success of certain agricultural plant products such as maize, rice, and wheat.
