= Labrys miyagiensis =

Scientific classification
- Domain: Bacteria
- Kingdom: Pseudomonadati
- Phylum: Pseudomonadota
- Class: Alphaproteobacteria
- Order: Hyphomicrobiales
- Family: Xanthobacteraceae
- Genus: Labrys
- Species: L. miyagiensis

Binomial name
- Labrys miyagiensis Islam et al. 2007

Type strain
- CIP 109578, DSM 18384, G24103, NBRC 101365, NCIMB 14143

Species of bacterium

Labrys miyagiensis is a Gram-negative, aerobic motile and non-spore-forming bacteria from the family Xanthobacteraceae which has been isolated from grassland soil in Sendai in the Miyagi Prefecture in Japan.
