= Starkeya koreensis =

Scientific classification
- Domain: Bacteria
- Kingdom: Pseudomonadati
- Phylum: Pseudomonadota
- Class: Alphaproteobacteria
- Order: Hyphomicrobiales
- Family: Xanthobacteraceae
- Genus: Starkeya
- Species: S. koreensis

Binomial name
- Starkeya koreensis Im et al. 2006

Type strain
- CIP 109384, DSM 18406, IAM 15215, JCM 21669, Jip08, KCTC 12212, NBRC 100963

Species of bacterium

Starkeya koreensis is a Gram-negative, aerobic, rod-shaped, non-spore-forming and non-motile bacteria from the family Xanthobacteraceae which has been isolated from the stem of a rice straw in Daejon in Korea.
