= Labrys methylaminiphilus =

Scientific classification
- Domain: Bacteria
- Kingdom: Pseudomonadati
- Phylum: Pseudomonadota
- Class: Alphaproteobacteria
- Order: Hyphomicrobiales
- Family: Xanthobacteraceae
- Genus: Labrys
- Species: L. methylaminiphilus

Binomial name
- Labrys methylaminiphilus Miller et al. 2005

Type strain
- ATCC BAA-1080, DSM 16812, IAM 15351, JCM 21796, JLW10

Species of bacterium

Labrys methylaminiphilus is a Gram-negative and non-motile bacteria from the family Xanthobacteraceae which has been isolated from sediments of a lake in Seattle, Washington, United States.
