= Angulomicrobium tetraedrale =

Scientific classification
- Domain: Bacteria
- Kingdom: Pseudomonadati
- Phylum: Pseudomonadota
- Class: Alphaproteobacteria
- Order: Hyphomicrobiales
- Family: Xanthobacteraceae
- Genus: Angulomicrobium
- Species: A. tetraedrale

Binomial name
- Angulomicrobium tetraedrale Vasil'eva et al. 1986

Type strain
- AUCM B-1335, DSM 5895, VKM B-1335, Z-2821

Species of bacterium

Angulomicrobium tetraedrale is a bacterium from the genus Angulomicrobium.
