= Xanthobacter autotrophicus =

Scientific classification
- Domain: Bacteria
- Kingdom: Pseudomonadati
- Phylum: Pseudomonadota
- Class: Alphaproteobacteria
- Order: Hyphomicrobiales
- Family: Xanthobacteraceae
- Genus: Xanthobacter
- Species: X. autotrophicus

Binomial name
- Xanthobacter autotrophicus Wiegel et al. 1978

Type strain
- 7C, ATCC 35674, BCRC 12235, CCRC 12235, CIP 105431, DSM 432, IAM 12579, IAM 12636, JCM 1202, LMG 7043, NBRC 102463, NCAIM B.01945, NCIB 10809, NCIMB 10809, NRRL B-14836, Siebert 7C

Synonyms
- Corynebacterium autotrophicum

Species of bacterium

Xanthobacter autotrophicus is a Gram-negative, aerobic, pleomorphic and nitrogen-fixing bacterium from the family of Xanthobacteraceae which has been isolated from black pool sludge in Germany. Xanthobacter autotrophicus can utilize 1,2-dichloroethane, methanol and propane.
