= Labrys okinawensis =

Scientific classification
- Domain: Bacteria
- Kingdom: Pseudomonadati
- Phylum: Pseudomonadota
- Class: Alphaproteobacteria
- Order: Hyphomicrobiales
- Family: Xanthobacteraceae
- Genus: Labrys
- Species: L. okinawensis

Binomial name
- Labrys okinawensis Islam et al. 2007

Type strain
- CIP 109597, DSM 18385, MAFF 210191

Species of bacterium

Labrys okinawensis is a bacterium from the family Xanthobacteraceae which has been isolated from root nodule from the plant Entada phaseoloides in Okinawa in Japan.
