= Ancylobacter rudongensis =

Scientific classification
- Domain: Bacteria
- Kingdom: Pseudomonadati
- Phylum: Pseudomonadota
- Class: Alphaproteobacteria
- Order: Hyphomicrobiales
- Family: Xanthobacteraceae
- Genus: Ancylobacter
- Species: A. rudongensis

Binomial name
- Ancylobacter rudongensis Xin et al. 2004

Type strain
- AS 1.1761, BCRC 17434, CCRC 17434, CGMCC 1.1761, CIP 108316, DSM 17131, JCM 11671, Y. H. Xin, YCM 11671

Species of bacterium

Ancylobacter rudongensis is a bacterium from the family Xanthobacteraceae which has been isolated from root of the plant Spartina anglica from the beach from the Jiangsu Province in China.
