= Ancylobacter polymorphus =

Scientific classification
- Domain: Bacteria
- Kingdom: Pseudomonadati
- Phylum: Pseudomonadota
- Class: Alphaproteobacteria
- Order: Hyphomicrobiales
- Family: Xanthobacteraceae
- Genus: Ancylobacter
- Species: A. polymorphus

Binomial name
- Ancylobacter polymorphus Xin et al. 2006

Type strain
- AS 1.2800, CCUG 30553, CGMCC 1.2800, CIP 109301, DSM 2457, ICI Pla5, NCIB 10516, NCIMB 10516, Pla5

Species of bacterium

Ancylobacter polymorphus is a bacterium from the family Xanthobacteraceae.
