= Solar Foods =

Finnish food-tech startup

Solar Foods Oy (Solar Foods Ltd)
- Type: Osakeyhtiö
- Founded: 2017; 9 years ago
- Founder: Juha-Pekka Pitkänen, Pasi Vainikka, Sami Holmström, Jero Ahola, Janne Mäkelä, Jari Tuovinen
- Headquarters: Vantaa, Finland
- Key people: Rami Jokela, CEO
- Products: Solein
- Website: solarfoods.fi

Solar Foods is a food company founded in 2017 and headquartered in Vantaa, Finland. It produces Solein, a single-cell protein produced through a gas fermentation process in which microorganisms consume hydrogen and carbon dioxide. The result is a flour-like protein powder that can be used as an ingredient in food products.

== History ==
=== 2017–2019 ===
Solar Foods is a spin-off created from a joint research project on renewable energy between VTT and LUT University, with the idea of creating food from air using electricity dating back to the 1960s. The research team received international publicity when the team announced in 2017 that it has succeeded in making food from the air. The company was founded by engineering PhDs Pasi Vainikka and Juha-Pekka Pitkänen, along with Sami Holmström, Jero Ahola, Jari Tuovinen, and Janne Mäkelä.

By the spring of 2018, Solar Foods had collected a seed funding of 800,000 euros for the construction of a pilot production plant. The main investor was Lifeline Ventures; other investors included VTT Ventures and Green Campus Innovations, an investment company operating on LUT's campus. The company also received a product development loan of over one million euros from Business Finland. Solar Foods started building a bioreactor tank where a kilogram of microbes can be produced daily. The company's previous bioreactor had been about the size of a coffee cup. Solar Foods intended to apply for novel food approval from the European Food Safety Authority so that the protein it produces could be used as human food. In the fall, Solar Foods joined the European Space Agency business incubator, intending to develop a system with which food can be prepared on Mars. A 40-liter bioreactor would produce the proteins needed by a crew of six. The company had three employees.

In 2019, Solar Foods launched its pilot plant, the output of which will be used to develop new products with partners. In the summer, the company said it was planning a protein factory larger than the first factory, producing around 6,000 tons per year. In September, the Fazer Group and Solar Foods announced their partnership. It was part of Solar Foods' financing round, which raised EUR 3.5 million in equity-term convertible bonds from Oy Karl Fazer Ab, Holdix Oy Ab, Turret Oy Ab and Lifeline Ventures.

=== 2020– ===
By April 2020, the company had received a total of 4.3 million euros in funding. In the summer, the company's pilot plant produced 300 grams of protein per day. It said that it aimed to open a facility 100 times larger in a couple of years. The next scaling up would be factory-scale, a facility about the size of a football field.

In April 2021, the Valtion Ilmastorahasto gave Solar Foods a loan of ten million euros for the new factory. By October, the company had collected EUR 43 million in funding. It said it would start building Factory 01 in Vantaa, where it was to produce around 100 tons of Solein protein every year from the beginning of 2023.

In spring 2022, Solar Foods made it to the 11 finalists in the second phase of NASA's years-long food competition. The company was awarded in the first stage of the competition. The company also cooperates with European Space Agency. In October, Solar Foods received the first novel food permit for its product, in Singapore. It also had license processes going on in the EU, the UK and the United States. The company built its first commercial production plant in Vehkala, Vantaa. An electrolyzer and an 8 metres (26 ft)-diameter bioreactor for growing protein will be installed in the hall. The EU Commission granted IPCEI (Important Project of Common European Interest) status to Solar Foods.

In January 2023, it was reported that Solar Foods had received EUR 33.6 million in IPCEI funding from Business Finland for its hydrogen project. In the summer, the company started selling consumer products in Singapore. Singapore is very dependent on the food production of other countries, as agriculture is small in the country and 90% of food is imported from abroad. Cooperation with the Japanese Ajinomoto group was started. In September, it was reported that the company is developing an artificial milk protein, beta-lactoglobulin, with three other organizations. This European Innovation Council-funded Hydrocow project aims to produce milk protein with Xanthobacter, carbon dioxide and electricity.

In 2024, Solar Foods Oyj has listed its shares on Nasdaq First North Growth Market Finland. Solar Foods has been awarded a Phase 3 winner in NASA’s Deep Space Food Challenge.

== Solein ==
Solein
- Invented: 2017
- Main ingredients: heat-treated Xanthobacter powder
Nutritional value
(per 100 g serving)
- Protein: 80 g
- Fat: 6 g
- Carbohydrate: 10 (fiber) g

Solar Foods Ltd. manufactures Solein, a single-cell protein. According to the company, Solein is typically composed of 80% protein, 6% fat, and 10% dietary fibers. It is reported to look and taste like wheat flour. The product's initial launch was set to be in 2021, but production began in 2024.

Solein is made by extracting carbon dioxide (CO_{2}) from the atmosphere (see Direct air capture) and combining it with hydrogen (captured through hydrolysis), mineral nutrients and optionally vitamins. The hydrogen-oxidizing bacteria Xanthobacter sp. VTT-E-193585, also known as Xanthobacter sp. SoF1, is able to use these input gases and nutrients to reproduce and grow in a chemoautotrophic way. It can turn inorganic nitrogen (such as ammonium) into organic nitrogen (like amino acids and proteins). Electricity is needed for the process, but solar energy from Fortum (its partner) is used.

The product has been tested in products such as meat alternative, noodles, and ice cream.

=== Research ===
The bacterium was originally isolated from Baltic Sea shore sediment, specifically from the Turku archipelago.

A 2024 article authored by Solar Food's employees and others evaluates whether the protein-rich powder is genotoxic. Although unheated Xanthobacter components have previously shown to be genotoxic, heat-treated Xanthobacter extracts, including Solein, are not.

=== Impact ===
In his 2019 documentary Apocalypse Cow, George Monbiot claimed the product could have a revolutionary impact on food production, quoting Solar Foods as saying that the land efficiency was about 20,000 times greater than conventional farming. This figure only applies to the footprint of the factories themselves; if the land use for solar panels to power the process is also taken into account, it would be around ten times as efficient as farming soybeans.

Writing in New Scientist, Michael Le Page expressed doubts over how beneficial the technology will be overall, particularly regarding its hydrogen requirements, but wrote that "the potential rewards are so immense that we should be pouring vast sums of money into finding out".

== See also ==
- Fermentative hydrogen production
