= Xanthobacter flavus =

Scientific classification
- Domain: Bacteria
- Kingdom: Pseudomonadati
- Phylum: Pseudomonadota
- Class: Alphaproteobacteria
- Order: Hyphomicrobiales
- Family: Xanthobacteraceae
- Genus: Xanthobacter
- Species: X. flavus

Binomial name
- Xanthobacter flavus Malik and Claus 1979

Type strain
- ATCC 35867, BCRC 12271, CCM 4469, CCRC 12271, CIP 105434, DSM 338, IFO 14759, JCM 1204, Kalininskaya 301, LMG 7045, NBRC 14759, NCAIM B.01946, NCIB 10071, NCIMB 10071, NRRL B-14838, strain 301, VKM B-2106, VKM B-2106.

Synonyms
- Mycobacterium flavum

Species of bacterium

Xanthobacter flavus is a Gram-negative, nitrogen-fixing and facultatively autotrophic bacteria from the family of Xanthobacteraceae which has been isolated from turf podsol soil in Russia. Xanthobacter flavus has the ability to degrade phenol, oxalate and 1,4-dichlorobenzene.
