= Caldimicrobium thiodismutans =

Scientific classification
- Domain: Bacteria
- Kingdom: Pseudomonadati
- Phylum: Thermodesulfobacteriota
- Class: Thermodesulfobacteria
- Order: Thermodesulfobacteriales
- Family: Thermodesulfobacteriaceae
- Genus: Caldimicrobium
- Species: C. thiodismutans

Binomial name
- Caldimicrobium thiodismutans Kojima et al. 2016

Type strain
- DSM 29380, NBRC 110713, TF1

Synonyms
- Thermosulfurisoma calidifontis

Species of bacterium

Caldimicrobium thiodismutans is a Gram-negative, thermophilic, rod-shaped, autotrophic and motile bacterium from the genus of Caldimicrobium which has been isolated from a hot spring in Nakabusa in Japan.
