= Ancylobacter pratisalsi =

Scientific classification
- Domain: Bacteria
- Kingdom: Pseudomonadati
- Phylum: Pseudomonadota
- Class: Alphaproteobacteria
- Order: Hyphomicrobiales
- Family: Xanthobacteraceae
- Genus: Ancylobacter
- Species: A. pratisalsi

Binomial name
- Ancylobacter pratisalsi Suarez et al. 2017

Type strain
- DSM 102029, LMG 29367, strain E130

Species of bacterium

Ancylobacter pratisalsi is a Gram-negative, aerobic and non-motile bacteria from the genus Ancylobacter which has been isolated from rhizospheric soil of the plant Plantago winteri.
