= Aquabacter =

Scientific classification
- Domain: Bacteria
- Kingdom: Pseudomonadati
- Phylum: Pseudomonadota
- Class: Alphaproteobacteria
- Order: Hyphomicrobiales
- Family: Xanthobacteraceae
- Genus: Aquabacter; Irgens et al. 1993

Type species
- Aquabacter spiritensis

Species
- A. spiritensis

Genus of bacteria

Aquabacter is an oxidase and catalase-positive genus of bacteria from the family of Hyphomicrobiaceae. It contains only the single species A. spiritensis.
