= Azospirillum =

Scientific classification
- Domain: Bacteria
- Kingdom: Pseudomonadati
- Phylum: Pseudomonadota
- Class: Alphaproteobacteria
- Order: Rhodospirillales
- Family: Azospirillaceae
- Genus: Azospirillum; Tarrand et al. 1979

Type species
- Azospirillum lipoferum

Species
- A. agricola Lin et al. 2016; A. baldaniorum Dos Santos Ferreira et al. 2020; A. brasilense corrig. Tarrand et al. 1979 (Approved Lists 1980); A. canadense Mehnaz et al. 2007; A. doebereinerae Eckert et al. 2001; A. fermentarium Lin et al. 2013; A. formosense Lin et al. 2012; A. griseum Yang et al. 2019; A. halopraeferens Reinhold et al. 1987; A. humicireducens Zhou et al. 2013; A. largimobile corrig. (Skerman et al. 1983) Ben Dekhil et al. 1997; A. lipoferum (Beijerinck 1925) Tarrand et al. 1979 (Approved Lists 1980); A. melinis Peng et al. 2006; "A. oleiclasticum" Wu et al. 2020; A. oryzae Xie and Yokota 2005; "A. palatum" Zhou et al. 2009; A. palustre Tikhonova et al. 2019; A. picis Lin et al. 2009; A. ramasamyi Anandham et al. 2019; A. rugosum Young et al. 2008; A. soli Lin et al. 2015; A. thermophilum Zhao et al. 2020; A. thiophilum Lavrinenko et al. 2010; A. zeae Mehnaz et al. 2007

Synonyms
- Conglomeromonas Skerman et al. 1983

Genus of bacteria

Azospirillum is a Gram-negative, microaerophilic, non-fermentative and nitrogen-fixing bacterial genus from the family of Rhodospirillaceae. Azospirillum bacteria can promote plant growth.

== Characteristics ==
The genus Azospirillum belongs in the Alphaproteobacteria class of bacteria. Azospirillum are gram-negative, do not form spores, and have a slightly twisted oblong-rod shape. Azospirillum have at least one flagellum and sometimes multiple flagella, which they use to move rapidly. Azospirillum are aerobic, but many can also function as microaerobic diazotrophs, meaning, under low oxygen conditions, they can change inert nitrogen from the air into biologically usable forms. At least three species, A. melinis, A. thiophilum, and A. humicireducens are facultative anaerobes, and can live, if necessary, without oxygen. Growth of Azospirillum is possible between 5 °C and 42 °C and in substrates with a pH of 5 to 9, with optimal growth occurring around 30 °C and 7 pH. Microbiologists use nitrogen-free semi-solid media to isolate Azospirillum from samples. The most commonly used media is called "NFb".

== Discovery and reclassification ==
The first species described in the genus was originally named Spirillum lipoferum in 1925 by M.W. Beijerinck. In Brazil, during the 1970s, similar strains of this species were found associated with the roots of grain plants by scientists led by Dr. Johanna Döbereiner. Her group discovered that these bacteria had the ability to fix nitrogen. Due to this discovery, Spirillum lipoferum was reclassified in 1978 as Azospirillum lipoferum by Jeffery Tarrand, Noel Krieg, and Döbereiner, who also added Azospirillum brasilense to the genus. By 2020, twenty-one species of Azospirillum had been described, most of which had been discovered after the year 2000.

== Origin of name ==
The prefix "Azo-" comes from the French word "azote", which means nitrogen. This prefix is used to denote the ability of the bacteria to fix atmospheric nitrogen. The ending "-spirillum" refers to the shape of the bacteria, which is similar to spiral-shaped bacteria in the genus Spirillum.

== Ecological and agricultural significance ==
Azospirillum are found in freshwater and soil habitats, especially in close relationships with plant roots. Associations with plants are thought to be largely beneficial. Over 113 species of plants in 35 different plant families have been documented to have benefited from association with a species of Azospirillum. In addition to vascular plants, the growth of the algae Chlorella vulgaris was positively affected by the presence of Azospirillum. Since the 1970s, Azospirillum strains have been researched for their effects in improving agricultural yields and improving growth of wild plants. In 2009, the first commercial inoculants containing Azospirillum came on the market, and by 2018, over 3 million doses were applied annually to crops by farmers, mainly in South America.

== Plant growth promotion ==
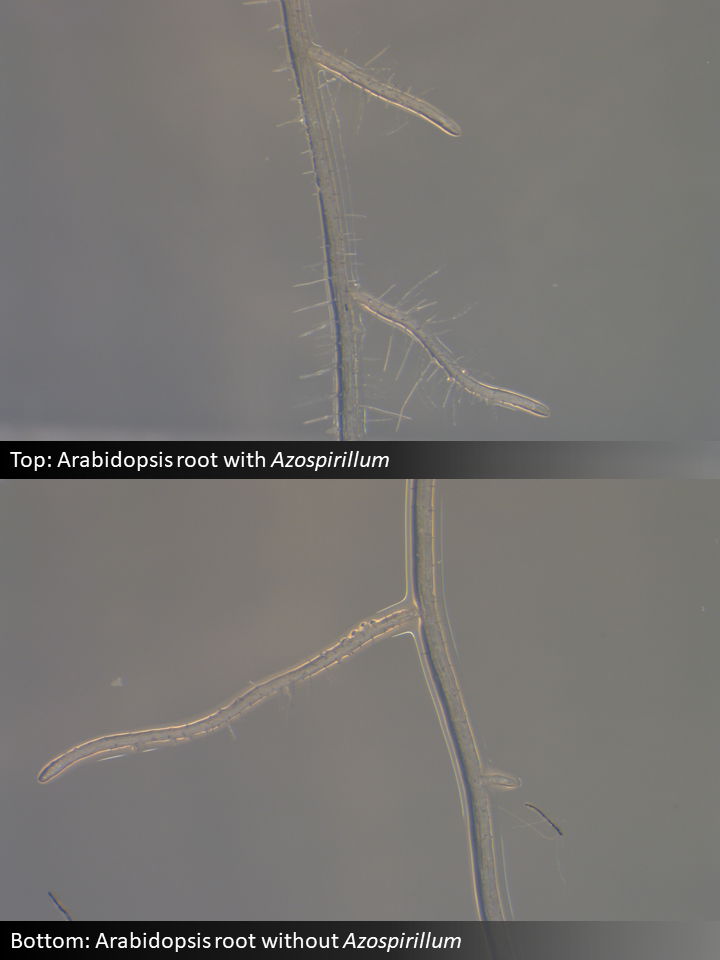
Azospirillum promotes growth of fine root hairs.

Azospirillum promote plant growth through a variety of mechanisms. Many Azospirillum excrete plant hormones that alter how the roots of plants grow. Affected roots frequently grow more branches and fine root hairs, which may help the plants acquire water and nutrients more efficiently. In addition to these changes, Azospirillum can also alter the forms of plant nutrients such as nitrogen and phosphorus to make them more available to plants. However, how much nitrogen Azospirillum contribute to crop plants via biological fixation is debated. Azospirillum also make antioxidants that protect the plant roots from stresses due to drought and flooding.

Plant growth can also be promoted indirectly by Azospirillum reducing plant disease. Azospirillum competes with pathogens on the roots for space and for trace nutrients such as iron. The plants' immune systems can also be primed by Azospirillum to resist attack by pathogens, a process known as induced systemic resistance.

== Known species and genetic diversity ==
Azospirillum genus harbor over than 20 described species. Despite the remarkable plant growth-promotion properties, less than half of Azospirillum species have the genome sequenced: A. brasilense, A. thiophilum, A. lipoferum, A. oryzae, A. palustre, A. doebereinerae, A. halopraeferens and several undescribed Azospirillum sp. strains. When accessing a phylogenetic tree with all Azospirillum genomes, it is possible to identify two monophyletic groups, one harboring exclusively A. brasilense strains and another the remaining species. This strongly suggests a higher differentiation of A. brasilense from the remaining strains. The second clade also has very high diversity and not enough resolution to determine strains species only using genetic data.

Name	Paper that first described species	Details about species
Azospirillum agricola	Lin et al. 2016	Isolated from agricultural soil in Taiwan
Azospirillum brasilense	corrig. Tarrand et al. 1979	Isolated from roots of grasses in South America; One of the best studied species in the genus; Heavily researched for applications in agriculture; Used commercially to promote crop growth, especially in South America.
Azospirillum canadense	Mehnaz et al. 2007	Isolated from corn roots in Canada
Azospirillum doebereinerae	Eckert et al. 2001	Isolated from Miscanthus grass roots in Germany
Azospirillum fermentarium	Lin et al. 2013	Isolated from a fermentation tank in Taiwan
Azospirillum formosense	Lin et al. 2012	Isolated from agricultural soil in Taiwan
Azospirillum griseum	Yang et al. 2019	Isolated from water from Baiyang Lake in China
Azospirillum halopraeferens	Reinhold et al. 1987	Isolated from salt-tolerant Kallar grass in Pakistan; Has been shown to survive in seawater after experimental inoculation on the roots of mangroves
Azospirillum humicireducens	Zhou et al. 2013	Isolated from a microbial fuel cell in China
Azospirillum largimobile	corrig. (Skerman et al. 1983) Ben Dekhil et al. 1997	Isolated from lake water in Australia; originally called Conglomeromonas largomobilis
Azospirillum lipoferum	Tarrand et al. 1979	First species to be described in the genus; First isolated from garden soil
Azospirillum melinis	Peng et al. 2006	Isolated from molasses grass in China
Azospirillum oryzae	Xie and Yokota 2005	Isolated from rice roots in Japan
Azospirillum palustre	Tikhonova et al. 2019	Isolated from sphagnum peat in Russia; Can use methanol as a food source
Azospirillum picis	Lin et al. 2009	Isolated from tar in Taiwan
Azospirillum ramasamyi	Anandham et al. 2019	Isolated from bovine fermentation products in Korea
Azospirillum rugosum	Young et al. 2008	Isolated from oil contaminated soil in Taiwan
Azospirillum soli	Lin et al. 2015	Isolated from agricultural soil in Taiwan
Azospirillum thermophilum	Zhao et al. 2020	Isolated from a hot spring in China
Azospirillum thiophilum	Lavrinenko et al. 2010	Isolated from a sulfide spring in Russia
Azospirillum zeae	Mehnaz et al. 2007	Isolated from corn roots in Canada
