= Xanthobacter tagetidis =

Scientific classification
- Domain: Bacteria
- Kingdom: Pseudomonadati
- Phylum: Pseudomonadota
- Class: Alphaproteobacteria
- Order: Hyphomicrobiales
- Family: Xanthobacteraceae
- Genus: Xanthobacter
- Species: X. tagetidis

Binomial name
- Xanthobacter tagetidis Padden et al. 1997

Type strain
- ATCC 700314, DSM 11105, NCIMB 13547, TAG-T2C, TagT2C

Species of bacterium

Xanthobacter tagetidis is a bacterium from the family of Xanthobacteraceae which has been isolated from soil from Root balls around the plant Tagetes patula in the United Kingdom. Xanthobacter tagetidis has the ability to grow on substituted thiophenes.
