= Labrys (bacterium) =

Scientific classification
- Domain: Bacteria
- Kingdom: Pseudomonadati
- Phylum: Pseudomonadota
- Class: Alphaproteobacteria
- Order: Hyphomicrobiales
- Family: Xanthobacteraceae
- Genus: Labrys; Vasilyeva and Semenov 1985

Type species
- Labrys monachus

Species
- L. methylaminiphilus Miller et al. 2005; L. miyagiensis Islam et al. 2007; L. monachus corrig. Vasilyeva and Semenov 1985; L. neptuniae Chou et al. 2007; L. okinawensis Islam et al. 2007; L. portucalensis Carvalho et al. 2008; L. soli Nguyen et al. 2015; L. wisconsinensis Albert et al. 2010

Genus of bacteria

Labrys is a genus of bacteria from the family Xanthobacteraceae.
