= Pelomonas =

Scientific classification
- Domain: Bacteria
- Kingdom: Pseudomonadati
- Phylum: Pseudomonadota
- Class: Betaproteobacteria
- Order: Burkholderiales
- Family: Comamonadaceae
- Genus: Pelomonas; Xie and Yokota 2005

Type species
- Pelomonas saccharophila

Species
- Pelomonas aquatica Pelomonas puraquae Pelomonas saccharophila

Genus of bacteria

Pelomonas is a genus of Gram-negative, rod-shaped, non-spore-forming bacteria from the family Comamonadaceae, which were isolated from haemodialysis water.
