= Azorhizobium doebereinerae =

Scientific classification
- Domain: Bacteria
- Kingdom: Pseudomonadati
- Phylum: Pseudomonadota
- Class: Alphaproteobacteria
- Order: Hyphomicrobiales
- Family: Xanthobacteraceae
- Genus: Azorhizobium
- Species: A. doebereinerae

Binomial name
- Azorhizobium doebereinerae Moreira et al. 2006

Synonyms
- "Azorhizobium johannae" Gonçalves and Moreira 2004; "Azorhizobium johannense" Moreira et al. 2002

Species of bacterium

Azorhizobium doebereinerae is a species of bacteria in the family Xanthobacteraceae. Strains of this species were originally isolated from root nodules of the shrub Sesbania virgata in Brazil. They have also been found in other Sesbania species.
