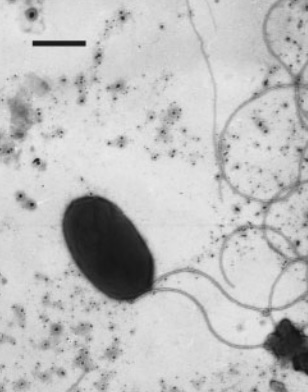
- Caldimicrobium rimae

Scientific classification
- Domain: Bacteria
- Kingdom: Pseudomonadati
- Phylum: Thermodesulfobacteriota
- Class: Thermodesulfobacteria
- Order: Thermodesulfobacteriales
- Family: Thermodesulfobacteriaceae
- Genus: Caldimicrobium
- Species: C. rimae

Binomial name
- Caldimicrobium rimae Miroshnichenko et al. 2009

Type strain
- DS, DSM 19393, VKM B-2460

Synonyms
- Caldus autotrophicum

= Caldimicrobium rimae =

Species of bacterium

Caldimicrobium rimae is an extremely thermophilic, strictly anaerobic and facultatively chemolithoautotrophic bacterium from the genus of Caldimicrobium which has been isolated from the Treshchinnyi Spring from Uzon Caldera in Russia.

== Origins of taxonomical branch ==
Caldimicrobium rimae varies from its family of Thermodesulfobacteriaceae as it is not capable of oxidizing organic acids or alcohols and use sulfur as an electron receptor.
