= Inquilinus =

Scientific classification
- Domain: Bacteria
- Kingdom: Pseudomonadati
- Phylum: Pseudomonadota
- Class: Alphaproteobacteria
- Order: Rhodospirillales
- Family: Azospirillaceae
- Genus: Inquilinus; Coenye et al. 2002

Type species
- Inquilinus limosus

Species
- I. ginsengisoli I. limosus

Genus of bacteria

Inquilinus is a bacterial genus from the family Azospirillaceae.
