= Ancylobacter defluvii =

Scientific classification
- Domain: Bacteria
- Kingdom: Pseudomonadati
- Phylum: Pseudomonadota
- Class: Alphaproteobacteria
- Order: Hyphomicrobiales
- Family: Xanthobacteraceae
- Genus: Ancylobacter
- Species: A. defluvii

Binomial name
- Ancylobacter defluvii Poroshina et al. 2014

Type strain
- S15, SK15

Species of bacterium

Ancylobacter defluvii is a bacterium from the family Xanthobacteraceae.
