= Azospirillum doebereinerae =

Scientific classification
- Domain: Bacteria
- Kingdom: Pseudomonadati
- Phylum: Pseudomonadota
- Class: Alphaproteobacteria
- Order: Rhodospirillales
- Family: Azospirillaceae
- Genus: Azospirillum
- Species: A. doebereinerae

Binomial name
- Azospirillum doebereinerae Eckert et al. 2001

Species of bacterium

Azospirillum doebereinerae is a species of nitrogen-fixing bacteria associated with the roots of Miscanthus species. Its type strain is GSF71^{T} (= DSM 13131^{T}; reference strain Ma4 = DSM 13400).
