= Pelomonas puraquae =

Scientific classification
- Domain: Bacteria
- Kingdom: Pseudomonadati
- Phylum: Pseudomonadota
- Class: Betaproteobacteria
- Order: Burkholderiales
- Family: Comamonadaceae
- Genus: Pelomonas
- Species: P. puraquae

Binomial name
- Pelomonas puraquae Gomila et al. 2007

Type strain
- CCUG 52769, CECT 7234, strain Ps10

Species of bacterium

Pelomonas puraquae is a Gram-negative, rod-shaped, non-spore-forming bacterium from the genus Pelomonas in the family Comamonadaceae. Colonies of P. puraquae are pale brown, with darker centers. It was first isolated from haemodialysis water in Mallorca, Spain. The species name is derived from Latin purus (pure) and aqua (water).
