= Pelomonas aquatica =

Scientific classification
- Domain: Bacteria
- Kingdom: Pseudomonadati
- Phylum: Pseudomonadota
- Class: Betaproteobacteria
- Order: Burkholderiales
- Family: Comamonadaceae
- Genus: Pelomonas
- Species: P. aquatica

Binomial name
- Pelomonas aquatica Gomila et al. 2007

Type strain
- CCUG 52575, CECT 7233

Species of bacterium

Pelomonas aquatica is a Gram-negative, rod-shaped, non-spore-forming bacterium from the genus Pelomonas in the family Comamonadaceae. Colonies of P. aquatica are yellowish in color and dark and opaque.
