= Azorhizobium =

Scientific classification
- Domain: Bacteria
- Kingdom: Pseudomonadati
- Phylum: Pseudomonadota
- Class: Alphaproteobacteria
- Order: Hyphomicrobiales
- Family: Xanthobacteraceae
- Genus: Azorhizobium; Dreyfus et al. 1988

Type species
- Azorhizobium caulinodans

Species
- A. caulinodans Dreyfus et al. 1988; A. doebereinerae Moreira et al. 2006; A. oxalatiphilum Lang et al. 2013

Genus of bacteria

Azorhizobium is a genus of Gram-negative soil bacteria. They fix nitrogen in symbiosis with plants in the genus Sesbania. Strain ORS571 of A. caulinodans has been fully sequenced.

Azorhizobium caulinodans ORS571 has exceptional properties because it is able to fix nitrogen in both aerobic free-living and symbiotic states

Azorhizobium caulinodans ORS571 is a rice and wheat endophyte, and does not need plant metabolites to make functional nitrogenase, but low nitrogenase expression is observed when it is living in cereal roots.
