= Starkeya =

Scientific classification
- Domain: Bacteria
- Kingdom: Pseudomonadati
- Phylum: Pseudomonadota
- Class: Alphaproteobacteria
- Order: Hyphomicrobiales
- Family: Xanthobacteraceae
- Genus: Starkeya; Kelly et al. 2000

Type species
- Starkeya novella

Species
- S. koreensis Im et al. 2006; S. novella (Starkey 1934) Kelly et al. 2000; S. nomas Sahuquillo-Arce et al. 2023

Genus of bacteria

Starkeya is a genus of bacteria from the family of Xanthobacteraceae.
