= Methylorhabdus =

Scientific classification
- Domain: Bacteria
- Kingdom: Pseudomonadati
- Phylum: Pseudomonadota
- Class: Alphaproteobacteria
- Order: Hyphomicrobiales
- Family: Xanthobacteraceae
- Genus: Methylorhabdus; Doronina et al. 1996

Type species
- Methylorhabdus multivorans

Species
- M. multivorans

Genus of bacteria

Methylorhabdus is a genus of Gram-negative bacteria. Up to now, there is only one species of this genus known (Methylorhabdus multivorans)
