= Angulomicrobium =

Scientific classification
- Domain: Bacteria
- Kingdom: Pseudomonadati
- Phylum: Pseudomonadota
- Class: Alphaproteobacteria
- Order: Hyphomicrobiales
- Family: Xanthobacteraceae
- Genus: Angulomicrobium; Vasil'eva et al. 1986

Type species
- Angulomicrobium tetraedrale

Species
- A. amanitiforme A. tetraedrale

Genus of bacteria

Angulomicrobium is a genus of bacteria from the family of Hyphomicrobiaceae.
