= Hydrogenase maturation protease family =

Hydrogenase maturation protease
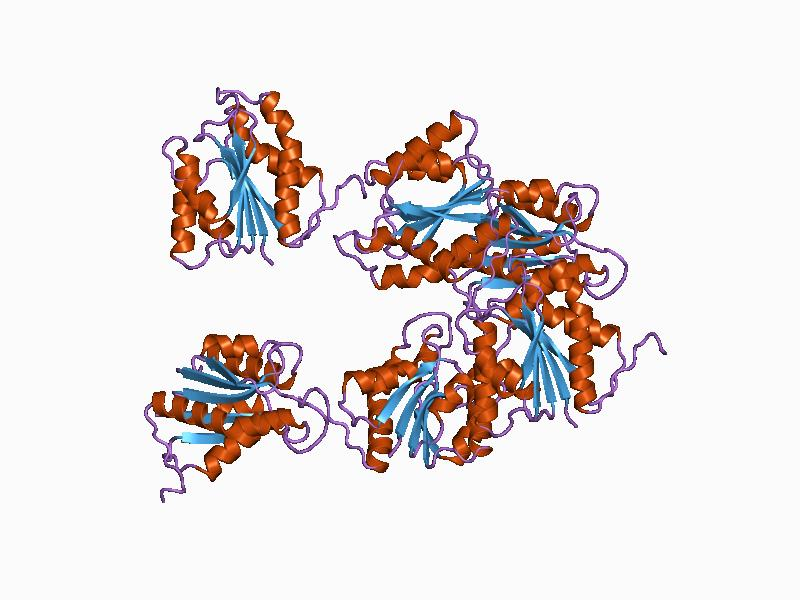
- hydrogenase maturating endopeptidase hybd from e. coli

Identifiers
- Symbol: HycI
- Pfam: PF01750
- Pfam clan: CL0095
- InterPro: IPR000671
- MEROPS: A31
- SCOP2: 1cfz / SCOPe / SUPFAM
Available protein structures:
- PDB: IPR000671 PF01750 (ECOD; PDBsum)
- AlphaFold: IPR000671; PF01750

In molecular biology, the hydrogenase maturation protease family is a family of aspartic endopeptidases belonging to MEROPS family A31.

The large subunit of [NiFe]-hydrogenase, as well as other nickel metalloenzymes, is synthesized as a precursor devoid of the metalloenzyme active site. This precursor undergoes a complex post-translational maturation process that requires a number of accessory proteins. At one step of this process, after nickel incorporation, each hydrogenase isoenzyme is processed by proteolytic cleavage at the C-terminal end by the corresponding hydrogenase maturation endopeptidase. For example, Escherichia coli HycI is involved in processing of pre-HycE (the large subunit of hydrogenase 3),; HybD is involved in processing of pre-HybC (the large subunit of hydrogenase 2); and HyaD is assumed to be involved in processing of the large subunit of hydrogenase 1.

The cleavage site is after a His or an Arg, liberating a short peptide. This cleavage occurs only in the presence of nickel, and the endopeptidase probably uses the metal in the large subunit of [NiFe]-hydrogenases as a recognition motif. There is no direct evidence for the active site or substrate-binding site, but there are predictions based on an available structure.

Nomenclature note: the following names are used in different organisms for members of this family: HycI, HybD, HyaD, HoxM, HoxW, HupD, HynC, HupM, VhoD, VhtD. Gene/protein names are sometimes used interchangeably to designate various "hydrogenase cluster" proteins unrelated to each other in various organisms. For example, the following names are used for members of this group, but also for unrelated proteins: HupD is used in Azotobacter chroococcum and Anabaena species to designate an unrelated hydrogenase maturation factor; HydD is used to designate hydrogenase structural genes in Thermococcus litoralis, Pyrococcus abyssi, and other species.
