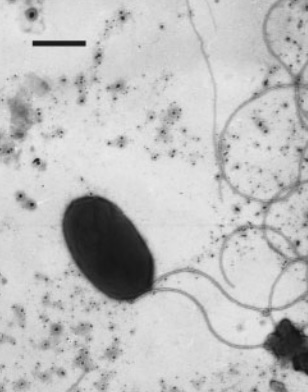
- Caldimicrobium rimae

Scientific classification
- Domain: Bacteria
- Kingdom: Pseudomonadati
- Phylum: Thermodesulfobacteriota
- Class: Thermodesulfobacteria
- Order: Thermodesulfobacteriales; Hatchikian, Ollivier & Garcia 2002

Families
- Thermodesulfatatoraceae; Thermodesulfobacteriaceae; "Thermosulfuriphilaceae"

= Thermodesulfobacteriales =

Order of bacteria

The Thermodesulfobacteriales are an order of sulfate-reducing bacteria.

== Phylogeny ==
The currently accepted taxonomy is based on the List of Prokaryotic names with Standing in Nomenclature (LPSN) and National Center for Biotechnology Information (NCBI).

16S rRNA based LTP_10_2024

- - - "Thermosulfuriphilaceae"
      Thermosulfuriphilus Slobodkina et al. 2017
  - - Thermodesulfatatoraceae
      Thermodesulfatator Moussard et al. 2004
    - Thermodesulfobacteriaceae
      - Thermosulfurimonas Slobodkin et al. 2012
      - - Caldimicrobium rimae Miroshnichenko et al. 2009
        - - Caldimicrobium thiodismutans Kojima, Umezawa & Fukui 2016
          - Thermodesulfobacterium Zeikus et al. 1995

120 marker proteins based GTDB 10-RS226

- - - "Thermosulfuriphilaceae"
      Thermosulfuriphilus
  - - Thermodesulfatatoraceae
      Thermodesulfatator
    - Thermodesulfobacteriaceae
      - Thermosulfurimonas
      - - Caldimicrobium
        - Thermodesulfobacterium

== See also ==
- List of bacterial orders
- List of bacteria genera
