= Phthalyl amidase =

phthalyl amidase

Identifiers
- EC no.: 3.5.1.79
- CAS no.: 169150-79-2

Databases
- IntEnz: IntEnz view
- BRENDA: BRENDA entry
- ExPASy: NiceZyme view
- KEGG: KEGG entry
- MetaCyc: metabolic pathway
- PRIAM: profile
- PDB structures: RCSB PDB PDBe PDBsum
- Gene Ontology: AmiGO / QuickGO
Search
- PMC: articles
- PubMed: articles
- NCBI: proteins

In enzymology, a phthalyl amidase (EC 3.5.1.79) is an enzyme that catalyzes the chemical reaction

a phthalylamide + H_{2}O $\rightleftharpoons$ phthalic acid + a substituted amine

Thus, the two substrates of this enzyme are phthalylamide and H_{2}O, whereas its two products are phthalic acid and substituted amine.

This enzyme belongs to the family of hydrolases, those acting on carbon-nitrogen bonds other than peptide bonds, specifically in linear amides. The systematic name of this enzyme class is phthalyl-amide amidohydrolase.
