= Hydrogen-oxidizing bacteria =

Hydrogen-oxidizing bacteria are a group of facultative autotrophs that can use hydrogen as an electron donor. They can be divided into aerobes and anaerobes. The former use hydrogen as an electron donor and oxygen as an acceptor while the latter use sulphate or nitrogen dioxide as electron acceptors. Species of both types have been isolated from a variety of environments, including fresh waters, sediments, soils, activated sludge, hot springs, hydrothermal vents and percolating water.

These bacteria are able to exploit the special properties of molecular hydrogen (for instance redox potential and diffusion coefficient) thanks to the presence of hydrogenases. The aerobic hydrogen-oxidizing bacteria are facultative autotrophs, but they can also have mixotrophic or completely heterotrophic growth. Most of them show greater growth on organic substrates. The use of hydrogen as an electron donor coupled with the ability to synthesize organic matter, through the reductive assimilation of CO_{2}, characterize the hydrogen-oxidizing bacteria.

Among the most represented genera of these organisms are Caminibacter, Aquifex, Ralstonia and Paracoccus.

== Sources of hydrogen ==
Hydrogen is the most widespread element in the universe, representing around three-quarters of all atoms. In the atmosphere, the concentration of molecular hydrogen (H_{2}) gas is about 0.5–0.6 ppm, and so it represents the second-most-abundant trace gas after methane. H_{2} can be used as energy source in biological processes because it has a highly negative redox potential (E_{0}′ = –0.414 V). It can be coupled with O_{2}, in oxidative respiration (2H_{2} + O_{2} → 2H_{2}O), or with oxidized compounds, such as carbon dioxide or sulfate.

In an ecosystem, hydrogen can be produced through abiotic and biological processes. The abiotic processes are mainly due to geothermal production and serpentinization.

In geothermal processes, hydrogen is usually present as a gas and may be obtained by different reactions:

1. Water may react with the silicon radical at high temperature:

Si· + H_{2}O → SiOH + H·

H· + H· → H_{2}

2. A proposed reaction between iron oxides and water may occur at temperatures higher than 800 °C:

2FeO + H_{2}O → Fe_{2}O_{3} + H_{2}

2Fe_{3}O_{4} + H_{2}O → 3Fe_{2}O_{3} + H_{2}

Occurring at ambient temperature, serpentinization is an exothermic geochemical mechanism that takes place when ultramafic rocks from deep in the Earth rise and encounter water. This process can produce large quantities of H_{2}, as well as methane and organic substances.

The main biotic mechanisms that lead to the formation of hydrogen are nitrogen fixation and fermentation. The first happens in bacteria, such as cyanobacteria, that have a specialized enzyme, nitrogenase, which catalyzes the reduction of N_{2} to NH_{4}^{+}. In addition, these microorganisms have another enzyme, hydrogenase, that oxidizes the H_{2} released as a by-product. If the nitrogen-fixing bacteria have low amounts of hydrogenase, excess H_{2} can be released into the environment. The amount of hydrogen released depends on the ratio between H_{2} production and consumption. The second mechanism, fermentation, is performed by some anaerobic heterotrophic bacteria, in particular Clostridia, that degrade organic molecules, producing hydrogen as one of the products. This type of metabolism mainly occurs in anoxic sites, such as lake sediments, deep-sea hydrothermal vents and the animal gut.

The ocean is supersaturated with hydrogen, presumably as a result of these biotic processes. Nitrogen fixation is thought to be the major mechanism involved in the production of H_{2} in the oceans. Release of hydrogen in the oceans is dependent on solar radiation, with a daily peak at noon. The highest concentrations are in the first metres near the surface, decreasing to the thermocline and reaching their minimum in the deep oceans. Globally, tropical and subtropical oceans have the greatest abundance of H_{2}.

== Examples ==
=== Hydrothermal vents ===
H_{2} is an important electron donor in hydrothermal vents. In this environment hydrogen oxidation represents a significant origin of energy, sufficient to conduct ATP synthesis and autotrophic CO_{2} fixation, so hydrogen-oxidizing bacteria form an important part of the ecosystem in deep sea habitats. Among the main chemosynthetic reactions that take place in hydrothermal vents, the oxidation of sulphide and hydrogen holds a central role. In particular, for autotrophic carbon fixation, hydrogen oxidation metabolism is more favored than sulfide or thiosulfate oxidation, although less energy is released (only –237 kJ/mol compared to –797 kJ/mol). To fix a mole of carbon during the hydrogen oxidation, one-third of the energy necessary for the sulphide oxidation is used. This is because hydrogen has a more negative redox potential than NAD(P)H. Depending on the relative amounts of sulphide, hydrogen and other species, energy production by oxidation of hydrogen can be as much as 10–18 times higher than production by the oxidation of sulphide.

=== Knallgas bacteria ===
Aerobic hydrogen-oxidizing bacteria, sometimes called knallgas bacteria, are bacteria that oxidize hydrogen with oxygen as final electron acceptor. These bacteria include Hydrogenobacter thermophilus, Cupriavidus necator, and Hydrogenovibrio marinus. There are both Gram positive and Gram negative knallgas bacteria.

Most grow best under microaerobic conditions because the hydrogenase enzyme is inhibited by the presence of oxygen and yet oxygen is still needed as a terminal electron acceptor in energy metabolism.

The word Knallgas means "oxyhydrogen" (a mixture of hydrogen and oxygen, literally "bang-gas") in German.

==== Strain MH-110 ====
Ocean surface water is characterized by a high concentration of hydrogen. In 1989, an aerobic hydrogen-oxidizing bacterium was isolated from sea water. The MH-110 strain (aka DSM 11271, type strain of Hydrogenovibrio marinus) is able to grow under normal temperature conditions and in an atmosphere (under a continuous gas flow system) characterized by an oxygen saturation of 40% (analogous characteristics are present in the surface water from which the bacteria were isolated, which is a fairly aerated medium). This differs from the usual behaviour of hydrogen-oxidizing bacteria, which in general thrive under microaerophilic conditions (<10% O_{2} saturation).

This strain is also capable of coupling the hydrogen oxidation with the reduction of sulfur compounds such as thiosulfate and tetrathionate.

==== Metabolism ====
Knallgas bacteria are able to fix carbon dioxide using H_{2} as their chemical energy source. Knallgas bacteria stand out from other hydrogen-oxidizing bacteria that, although using H_{2} as energy source, are not able to fix CO_{2}, as Knallgas do.

This aerobic hydrogen oxidation (H_{2} + O_{2} $\longrightarrow$ H_{2}O), also known as the Knallgas reaction, releases a considerable amount of energy, having a ΔG^{o} of –237 kJ/mol. The energy is captured as a proton motive force for use by the cell.

The key enzymes involved in this reaction are the hydrogenases, which cleave molecular hydrogen and feed its electrons into the electron transport chain, where they are carried to the final acceptor, O_{2}, extracting energy in the process. The hydrogen is ultimately oxidized to water, the end product. The hydrogenases are divided into three categories according to the type of metal present in the active site. These enzymes were first found in Pseudomonas saccharophila, Alcaligenes ruhlandii and Alcaligenese eutrophus, in which there are two types of hydrogenases: cytoplasmic and membrane-bound. While the first enzyme takes up hydrogen and reduces NAD^{+} to NADH for carbon fixation, the second is involved in the generation of the proton motive force. In most knallgas bacteria only the second is found.

While these microorganisms are facultative autotrophs, some are also able to live heterotrophicically using organic substances as electron donors; in this case, the hydrogenase activity is less important or completely absent.

However, knallgas bacteria, when growing as chemolithoautotrophs, can integrate a molecule of CO_{2} to produce, through the Calvin–Benson cycle, biomolecules necessary for the cell:

6H_{2} + 2O_{2} + CO_{2} $\longrightarrow$ (CH_{2}O) + 5H_{2}O

A study of Alcaligenes eutropha, a representative knallgas bacterium, found that at low concentrations of O_{2} (about 10 mol %) and consequently with a low ΔH_{2}/ΔCO_{2} molar ratio (3.3), the energy efficiency of CO_{2} fixation increases to 50%. Once assimilated, some of the carbon may be stored as polyhydroxybutyrate.

== Uses ==
Given enough nutrients, H_{2}, O_{2} and CO_{2}, many knallgas bacteria can be grown quickly in vats using only a small amount of land area. This makes it possible to cultivate them as an environmentally sustainable source of food and other products. For example, the polyhydroxybutyrate the bacteria produce can be used as a feedstock to produce biodegradable plastics in various eco-sustainable applications.

Solar Foods is a startup that has sought to commercialize knallgas bacteria for food production, using renewable energy to split hydrogen to grow a neutral-tasting, protein-rich food source for use in products such as artificial meat. Research studies have suggested that knallgas cultivation is more environmentally friendly than traditional agriculture.
