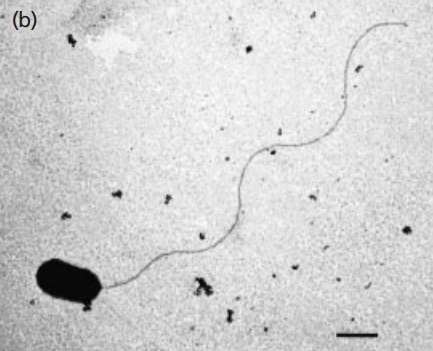
- Thermodesulfobacterium hydrogeniphilum

Scientific classification
- Domain: Bacteria
- Kingdom: Pseudomonadati
- Phylum: Thermodesulfobacteriota
- Class: Thermodesulfobacteria
- Order: Thermodesulfobacteriales
- Family: Thermodesulfobacteriaceae
- Genus: Thermodesulfobacterium; Zeikus et al. 1995

Type species
- Thermodesulfobacterium commune Zeikus et al. 1995

Species
- T. commune; T. geofontis; T. hydrogeniphilum; T. hveragerdense; "Ca. T. syntrophicum"; T. thermophilum

= Thermodesulfobacterium =

Genus of bacteria

Thermodesulfobacterium is a genus of sulfate-reducing bacteria.

== Phylogeny ==
The currently accepted taxonomy is based on the List of Prokaryotic names with Standing in Nomenclature (LPSN) and National Center for Biotechnology Information (NCBI).

16S rRNA based LTP_10_2024

- Thermodesulfobacterium
  - T. hydrogeniphilum
  - - T. commune
    - - T. hveragerdense
      - T. thermophilum

120 marker proteins based GTDB 10-RS226

- Thermodesulfobacterium
  - - T. geofontis Hamilton-Brehm et al. 2013
    - "Ca. T. syntrophicum" Zehnle et al. 2023
  - - T. hydrogeniphilum Jeanthon et al. 2002
    - - T. commune Zeikus et al. 1995
      - - T. hveragerdense Sonne-Hansen & Ahring 2000
        - T. thermophilum (Rozanova & Khudyakova 1974) Rozanova & Pivovarova 1995
