= Xanthobacter =

Scientific classification
- Domain: Bacteria
- Kingdom: Pseudomonadati
- Phylum: Pseudomonadota
- Class: Alphaproteobacteria
- Order: Hyphomicrobiales
- Family: Xanthobacteraceae
- Genus: Xanthobacter; Wiegel et al. 1978

Type species
- Xanthobacter autotrophicus

Species
- X. agilis Jenni and Aragno 1988; X. aminoxidans Doronina and Trotsenko 2003; X. autotrophicus (Baumgarten et al. 1974) Wiegel et al. 1978 (Approved Lists 1980); X. dioxanivorans Wang et al. 2021; X. flavus Malik and Claus 1979 (Approved Lists 1980); X. oligotrophicus Tikhonova et al. 2021; "Xanthobacter polyaromaticivorans" Hirano et al. 2004; X. tagetidis Padden et al. 1997; X. viscosus Doronina and Trotsenko 2003; "Xanthobacter xylophilus" Zaichikova et al. 2010

Genus of bacteria

Xanthobacter is a genus of Gram-negative bacteria from the family Xanthobacteraceae.

The genus Xanthobacter was established in 1978 by Wiegel et al. based on numerical taxonomic comparisons of microorganisms that were then classified in the genus Corynebacterium.

== Ecology ==
Members of the genus can be found in freshwater, wet soil that contains decaying organic materials and in the sediments.

== Phages ==
There are three known phages that can infect Xanthobacter autotrophicus strain GZ29. There are two lytic phages named CA1 and CA2. Both have head of 61-68 nm in diameter. CA1 has a 98-100 nm tails while the length of tail for CA2 is 166-175 nm. The third phage called CA3 is lysogenic in nature and contain head of 37-43 nm and a tail of 43-50 nm in length. CA3 also contains a small DNA molecule of 3.3 kDa.

== In vitro growth condition and maintenance ==
Most of the strains can grow chemolithoautotrophically in the mineral media in the presence of H_{2,} O_{2} and CO_{2}. Other strains can grow chemoorganoheterotrophically on methanol, ethanol, propanol, n-butanol and organic acids. Temperature for optimal growth varies from 25–42 °C. Generally, they can grow at pH 6.5-8 with optimum growth at pH 7.5. Some strains decrease the pH of the medium during growth. Therefore, addition of buffer is recommended to maintain the optimal growth. Cultures can be maintained for 10 months at 2-5 °C in liquid medium and for up to 15 months in sealed agar slants. At -20 °C, the culture can be stored for 3 years in the presence of 60% (v/v) glycerol. Lyophilization is recommended for long term storage.

== Phylogeny ==
The currently accepted taxonomy is based on the List of Prokaryotic names with Standing in Nomenclature (LPSN). The phylogeny is based on whole-genome analysis.

- - Xanthobacter
    - - Xanthobacter agilis
      - - Xanthobacter tagetidis
        - - Xanthobacter flavus
          - Xanthobacter aminoxidans
    - - Xanthobacter autotrophicus
      - Xanthobacter viscosus
  - outgroup
    Azorhizobium
