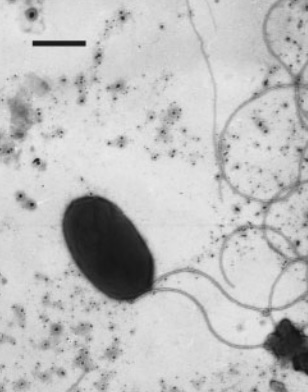
- Caldimicrobium rimae

Scientific classification
- Domain: Bacteria
- Kingdom: Pseudomonadati
- Phylum: Thermodesulfobacteriota
- Class: Thermodesulfobacteria
- Order: Thermodesulfobacteriales
- Family: Thermodesulfobacteriaceae; Hatchikian, Ollivier & Garcia 2002

Genera
- Caldimicrobium; Geothermobacterium; Thermodesulfobacterium; Thermosulfurimonas

= Thermodesulfobacteriaceae =

Family of bacteria

The Thermodesulfobacteriaceae are a family of sulfate-reducing bacteria.

== Phylogeny ==
The currently accepted taxonomy is based on the List of Prokaryotic names with Standing in Nomenclature (LPSN) and National Center for Biotechnology Information (NCBI).

16S rRNA based LTP_10_2024

- Thermodesulfobacteriaceae
  - Thermosulfurimonas Slobodkin et al. 2012
  - - Caldimicrobium rimae Miroshnichenko et al. 2009
    - - Caldimicrobium thiodismutans Kojima, Umezawa & Fukui 2016
      - Thermodesulfobacterium Zeikus et al. 1995

120 marker proteins based GTDB 10-RS226

- Thermodesulfobacteriaceae
  - Thermosulfurimonas
  - - Caldimicrobium
    - Thermodesulfobacterium

== See also ==
- List of bacterial orders
- List of bacteria genera
