= Pelomonas saccharophila =

Scientific classification
- Domain: Bacteria
- Kingdom: Pseudomonadati
- Phylum: Pseudomonadota
- Class: Betaproteobacteria
- Order: Burkholderiales
- Family: Comamonadaceae
- Genus: Pelomonas
- Species: P. saccharophila

Binomial name
- Pelomonas saccharophila (Doudoroff 1940); Xie and Yokota 2005

Synonyms
- Pseudomonas saccharophila Doudoroff 1940

Species of bacterium

Pelomonas saccharophila is a Gram-negative soil bacterium. It was originally named Pseudomonas saccharophila in 1940, but was reclassified in 2005 to the newly created genus, Pelomonas. The original strain was isolated from mud.
