= Azospirillaceae =

Scientific classification
- Domain: Bacteria
- Kingdom: Pseudomonadati
- Phylum: Pseudomonadota
- Class: Alphaproteobacteria
- Order: Rhodospirillales
- Family: Azospirillaceae; Hördt et al. 2020

Genera
- Azospirillum Tarrand et al. 1979 (Approved Lists 1980); Desertibacter Liu et al. 2011; Elstera Rahalkar et al. 2012; Inquilinus Coenye et al. 2002; Lacibacterium Sheu et al. 2013; Nitrospirillum Lin et al. 2015; Niveispirillum Lin et al. 2014; Rhodocista Kawasaki et al. 1994; Skermanella Sly and Stackebrandt 1999

Family of bacteria

Azospirillaceae is a family of bacteria in the order Rhodospirillales.
