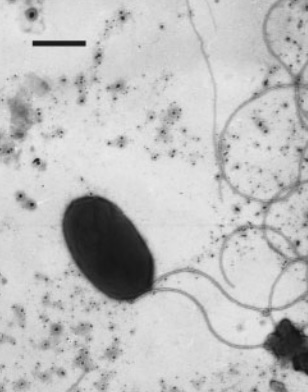
- Caldimicrobium rimae

Scientific classification
- Domain: Bacteria
- Kingdom: Pseudomonadati
- Phylum: Thermodesulfobacteriota
- Class: Thermodesulfobacteria; Hatchikian, Ollivier & Garcia 2002

Order
- Thermodesulfobacteriales

= Thermodesulfobacteria =

Class of Gram-negative bacteria

The Thermodesulfobacteria are a class of anaerobic, thermophilic, sulfate-reducing bacteria within the phylum Thermodesulfobacteriota.

== Phylogeny ==
The currently accepted taxonomy is based on the List of Prokaryotic names with Standing in Nomenclature (LPSN) and National Center for Biotechnology Information (NCBI).

16S rRNA based LTP_10_2024

- Thermodesulfobacteriales
  - "Thermosulfuriphilaceae" Pallen, Rodriguez-R & Alikhan 2022
  - - Thermodesulfatatoraceae Waite et al. 2020
    - Thermodesulfobacteriaceae Hatchikian, Ollivier & Garcia 2002

120 marker proteins based GTDB 10-RS226

- Thermodesulfobacteriales
  - "Thermosulfuriphilaceae"
  - - Thermodesulfatatoraceae
    - Thermodesulfobacteriaceae
