= Xanthobacteraceae =

Scientific classification
- Domain: Bacteria
- Kingdom: Pseudomonadati
- Phylum: Pseudomonadota
- Class: Alphaproteobacteria
- Order: Hyphomicrobiales
- Family: Xanthobacteraceae; Lee et al. 2005

Genera
- Ancylobacter Raj 1983; Angulomicrobium Vasil'eva et al. 1986; Aquabacter Irgens et al. 1993; Azorhizobium Dreyfus et al. 1988; Labrys Vasilyeva and Semenov 1985; Methylorhabdus Doronina et al. 1996; Starkeya Kelly et al. 2000; Xanthobacter Wiegel et al. 1978 (Approved Lists 1980); Former members: Microcyclus was reclassified as Ancylobacter. -->; Pseudolabrys was transferred to the family Nitrobacteraceae.; Peudoxanthobacter was transferred to the family Pseudoxanthobacteraceae.

Synonyms
- "Labriaceae" Beck et al. 2015

Family of bacteria

The Xanthobacteraceae are a family of bacteria that includes Azorhizobium, a genus of rhizobia. Xanthobacteraceae bacteria are diverse and Gram-negative, rod-shaped, and may be motile or non-motile depending on the specific bacteria. Their cells range in size from 0.4–1.0 × 0.8–6 μm, but when grown in the presence of alcohol as the sole carbon source, they can reach up to 10 μm in length. These bacteria do not form spores and have opaque, slimy colonies that appear slightly yellow due to the presence of zeaxanthin dirhamnoside.

In 2005, Lee et al. proposed the family Xanthobacteraceae based on a comparison of 16S rRNA of the members of Alphaproteobacteria. The family includes five genera, namely Xanthobacter, Azorhizobium, Ancylobacter, Labrys, and Starkeya.

== Phenotypic properties ==
The Xanthobacteraceae family is highly diverse, with some cells being polymorphic in shape. Their cells have a Gram-negative type cell wall and contain ubiquinone Q-10 as their major respiratory quinone. Refractile (phosphate) and lipid bodies are evenly distributed throughout the cells. However, as cells also contain polyphosphate granules, sometimes the Gram reaction can give false positive results.

Most chemolithoautotrophic strains of Xanthobacteraceae require H_{2,} O_{2} and CO_{2} in mineral media, while chemoorganoheterotrophic strains utilize various carbon sources such as methanol, ethanol, n-propanol, n-butanol, and different organic acids. Some genera within the family demonstrate the ability to fix nitrogen under reduced oxygen pressure.

== Genomics ==
On average the chromosomes are 4.77–5.37 Mbp in length. In Azorhizobium caulinodans, Starkeya novella, and X. autotrophicus, there are 4417–4847 predicted genes presents in the genome. A 316-kb plasmid containing 308 genes present in X. autotrophicus Py2 strains.

== Ecology ==
Rice paddies, soils environments, freshwater habitats such as ponds, creeks and lakes contain Ancylobacter aquaticus. Study showed that there is a relationship between the watershed urbanization and the alteration of bacterial community composition. Xanthobacteraceae consistently showed decreased abundance on increasing watershed urbanization.

== Pathogenicity and antibiotic sensitivity ==
There is no known pathogenic strain found in the Xanthobacteraceae. Some species of genus Azorhizobium are associated with plant such as Sesbania and some other leguminous plants that live in symbiosis. Some species of Xanthobacteraceae are sensitive to penicillin, novobiocin and polymyxin B. X. autotrophicus and X. flavus are resistant to erythromycin and bacitracin.

== Application ==
Xanthobacteraceae species, including X. viscosus and X. aminoxidans, are commonly found in activated sludge from water treatment plants, indicating their potential role in organic compound degradation within polluted environments. Recent studies have uncovered the biotechnological applications of Xanthobacter species. Some bacteria within this family can degrade toxic compounds, such as polycyclic aromatic compounds (PAHs), into CO_{2} and water. Furthermore, certain Xanthobacteraceae strains, such as Starkeya sp. strain N1B, can use toxic aromatic hydrocarbons like naphthalene as their sole carbon source for bacterial cellulose production. This process results in the production of cellulosic biofilm using toxic compounds, such as naphthalene Christal.

== Phylogeny ==
The currently accepted taxonomy is based on the List of Prokaryotic names with Standing in Nomenclature (LPSN). The phylogeny is based on whole-genome analysis.

- - Xanthobacteraceae
    - - - - Starkeya
          - - Methylorhabdus
            - Angulomicrobium
        - Ancylobacter
      - - Aquabacter
        - - Xanthobacter
          - Azorhizobium
    - Labrys
  - outgroup
    Blastochloridaceae
