= Heather Hendrickson =

American-born New Zealand-based microbiologist

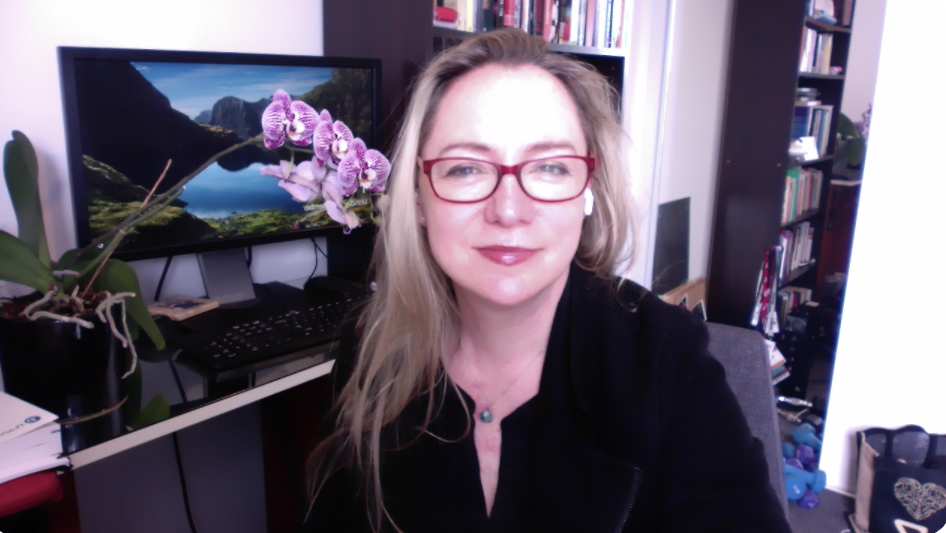
- Born: Salt Lake City

Academic background
- Education: University of Pittsburgh
- Thesis: Chromosome Architecture and Evolution in Bacteria (2008)
- Doctoral advisor: Professor Jeffrey G. Lawrence

Academic work
- Institutions: University of Canterbury, Massey University
- Website: hendricksonlab.co.nz

Heather Hendrickson is an American microbiologist based in New Zealand. She is an associate professor in the School of Biological Sciences at the University of Canterbury in Christchurch, New Zealand. She previously worked at Massey University, Auckland, New Zealand. Her research is focussed on the evolution of bacterial cell shape, and the discovery of bacteriophages that can attack antibiotic-resistant bacteria and the bee disease American foulbrood.

== Life and career ==
Hendrickson was born in Salt Lake City, Utah, and moved to California as a young child; she describes herself as "obsessed with birds and bugs from a really young age." Her family members were conservative Church of Jesus Christ of Latter-Day Saints (Mormons) who did not believe in evolution; in her household there were rules such as "no drinking alcohol, coffee or tea, no popular music and no one smokes. Girls had to wear skirts to church and we were trained as a kid to be a homemaker." However, by the time she went to graduate school in Pittsburgh, she had become an atheist.

Hendrickson graduated from the University of Utah in 2000 with a Bachelor of Science, then completed a PhD in Molecular, Cellular and Developmental Biology at the University of Pittsburgh in 2008. She spent three years as a postdoctoral researcher at the Biochemistry Department of the University of Oxford, as an HFSP Long-Term Fellow, researching variability of DNA replication in Escherichia coli. Hendrickson moved to the Albany campus of Massey University as a lecturer in evolutionary genetics, rising to Senior Lecturer in Molecular Bioscience in 2015. She moved from Massey University to become a Senior Lecturer at the University of Canterbury in 2022. She is currently the president of the New Zealand Microbiological Society.

== Research ==
Hendrickson studies microbial evolution, specifically bacteriophages and genomics of bacteria. Her research has two main components: transitions in bacterial evolution, including the evolution of cell shape, and the discovery of new bacteriophages, especially ones which could counter antibiotic-resistant bacteria. She uses a combination of experimental evolution, cell biology, and bacterial genomics.

=== Bacterial evolution ===
Analysis of the evolutionary tree of bacteria suggests the ancestral bacterium was rod-shaped. Hendrickson studies the way bacteria like Deinococcus, Staphylococcus, and Streptococcus bacteria evolved a spherical shape. All three of these genera lack the gene for the protein MreB (the equivalent of actin in eukaryotes) which controls the width of rod-shaped bacteria. Normally deleting this gene kills the bacterium, but Hendrickson's lab has evolved a rod-like bacterial strain that can withstand the deletion of the MreB gene, enabling them to study how a spherical shape has evolved.

To study the process of endosymbiosis, where one single-celled organism captures and incorporates another into its body, Hendrickson and her collaborators ran 10,000-generation experiments with mixtures of amoebae and their bacterial prey, to monitor possible collaborative partnerships that formed and sequence their genomes.

=== Bacteriophages ===
Hendrickson's lab works on discovering and understanding the biology of bacteriophages that attack the bacteria Pseudomonas, Lactocococus, Mycobacterium, and Paenibacillus. In collaboration with the American Foulbrood Management Agency, they are currently investigating phages that kill the bacterium Paenibacillus larvae, which causes American foulbrood (AFB) disease in honey bees. In New Zealand, antibiotics may not be used to control AFB because they leave residues in the honey, so hives are usually destroyed instead. The Hendrickson lab screens soil samples collected by beekeepers from beneath healthy hives, looking for bacteriophages that could be used to prevent AFB infection.

Hendrickson and her colleagues also work on discovering new bacteriophages that might be effective against antibiotic-resistant bacteria. Six of her students discovered bacteriophages that could kill Mycobacterium smegmatis, a relative of the tuberculosis bacterium M. tuberculosis, which can infect the lungs of vulnerable people such as cystic fibrosis sufferers.

== Selected works ==
- Wojtus, Joanna K.; Frampton, Rebekah A.; Warring, Suzanne; Hendrickson, Heather; Fineran, Peter C. (2019). "Genome Sequence of a Jumbo Bacteriophage That Infects the Kiwifruit Phytopathogen Pseudomonas syringae pv. actinidiae". Microbiology Resource Announcements. 8 (22) e00224-19. doi:10.1128/MRA.00224-19. PMC 6544186. PMID 31147429.
- Hendrickson, Heather L.; Barbeau, Dominique; Ceschin, Robin; Lawrence, Jeffrey G. (2018). "Chromosome architecture constrains horizontal gene transfer in bacteria". PLOS Genetics. 14 (5) e1007421. doi:10.1371/journal.pgen.1007421. PMC 5993296. PMID 29813058.
- Hanauer, David I.; Graham, Mark J.; SEA-PHAGES; Betancur, Laura; Bobrownicki, Aiyana; Cresawn, Steven G.; Garlena, Rebecca A.; Jacobs-Sera, Deborah; Kaufmann, Nancy; Pope, Welkin H.; Russell, Daniel A. (2017). "An inclusive Research Education Community (iREC): Impact of the SEA-PHAGES program on research outcomes and student learning". Proceedings of the National Academy of Sciences. 114 (51): 13531–13536. Bibcode:2017PNAS..11413531H. doi:10.1073/pnas.1718188115. PMC 5754813. PMID 29208718.
- Hendrickson, Heather; Lawrence, Jeffrey G. (2007). "Mutational bias suggests that replication termination occurs near the dif site, not at Ter sites: Replication termination occurs near the dif site". Molecular Microbiology. 64 (1): 42–56. doi:10.1111/j.1365-2958.2007.05596.x. PMID 17376071.
- Hendrickson, Heather; Lawrence, Jeffrey G. (2006). "Selection for Chromosome Architecture in Bacteria". Journal of Molecular Evolution. 62 (5): 615–629. Bibcode:2006JMolE..62..615H. doi:10.1007/s00239-005-0192-2. PMID 16612541. S2CID 16882265.
- Lawrence, Jeffrey G; Hendrickson, Heather (2005). "Genome evolution in bacteria: order beneath chaos". Current Opinion in Microbiology. 8 (5): 572–578. doi:10.1016/j.mib.2005.08.005. PMID 16122972.
- Hendrickson, H.; Slechta, E. S.; Bergthorsson, U.; Andersson, D. I.; Roth, J. R. (2002). "Amplification-mutagenesis: Evidence that "directed" adaptive mutation and general hypermutability result from growth with a selected gene amplification". Proceedings of the National Academy of Sciences. 99 (4): 2164–2169. Bibcode:2002PNAS...99.2164H. doi:10.1073/pnas.032680899. PMC 122336. PMID 11830643.
