= Collaborative intelligence =

Collaborative intelligence is distinguished from collective intelligence in three key ways: First, in collective intelligence there is a central controller who poses the question, collects responses from a crowd of anonymous responders, and uses an algorithm to process those responses to achieve a (typically) "better than average" consensus result, whereas collaborative intelligence focuses on gathering, and valuing, diverse input. Second, in collective intelligence the responders are anonymous, whereas in collaborative intelligence, as in social networks, participants are not anonymous. Third, in collective intelligence, as in the standard model of problem-solving, there is a beginning, when the central controller broadcasts the question, and an end, when the central controller announces the "consensus" result. In collaborative intelligence there is no central controller because the process is modeled on evolution. Distributed, autonomous agents contribute and share control, as in evolution and as manifested in the generation of Wikipedia articles.

Collaborative intelligence characterizes multi-agent, distributed systems where each agent, human or machine, is autonomously contributing to a problem solving network. Collaborative autonomy of organisms in their ecosystems makes evolution possible. Natural ecosystems, where each organism's unique signature is derived from its genetics, circumstances, behavior and position in its ecosystem, offer principles for design of next generation social networks to support collaborative intelligence, crowdsourcing individual expertise, preferences, and unique contributions in a problem solving process.

Four related terms are complementary:

- Collective intelligence processes input from a large number of anonymous responders to quantitative questions to produce better-than-average predictions.
- Crowdsourcing distributes microtasks to a large number of anonymous task performers.
- Human Computation engages the pattern-recognizing capacities of anonymous human microtask workers to improve on machine capabilities and enable machine learning.
- Collaborative intelligence complements the three methods defined above, but here task performers are not anonymous. Task performers have different skills, motivations and may perform different tasks. These non-anonymous devices and human contributors, from tagged sensors to geo-located devices to identified unique human contributors, drive collaborative problem-solving in next generation social networks.

== Overview ==
Collaborative intelligence is a term used in several disciplines. In business it describes heterogeneous networks of people interacting to produce intelligent outcomes. It can also denote non-autonomous multi-agent problem-solving systems. The term was used in 1999 to describe the behavior of an intelligent business "ecosystem" where Collaborative Intelligence, or CQ, is "the ability to build, contribute to and manage power found in networks of people." When the computer science community adopted the term collective intelligence and gave that term a specific technical denotation, a complementary term was needed to distinguish between anonymous homogeneity in collective prediction systems and non-anonymous heterogeneity in collaborative problem-solving systems. Anonymous collective intelligence was then complemented by collaborative intelligence, which acknowledged identity, viewing social networks as the foundation for next generation problem-solving ecosystems, modeled on evolutionary adaptation in nature's ecosystems.

== AI and Collaborative Intelligence ==
Although many sources warn that AI may cause the extinction of the human species, humans may cause our own extinction via climate change, ecosystem disruption, decline of our ocean lifeline, increasing mass murders and police brutality, and an arms race that could trigger World War III, driving humanity extinct before AI gets a chance. The surge of open source applications in generative AI demonstrates the power of collaborative intelligence (AI-human C-IQ) among distributed, autonomous agents, sharing achievements in collaborative partnerships and networks. The successes of small open source experiments in generative AI provide a model for a paradigm shift from centralized, hierarchical control to decentralized bottom-up, evolutionary development. The key role of AI in collaborative intelligence was predicted in 2012 when Zann Gill wrote that collaborative intelligence (C-IQ) requires "multi-agent, distributed systems where each agent, human or machine, is autonomously contributing to a problem-solving network." Gill's ACM paper has been cited in applications ranging from an NIH (U. S. National Institute of Health) Center for Biotechnology study of human robot collaboration, to an assessment of cloud computing tradeoffs. A key application domain for collaborative intelligence is risk management, where preemption is an anticipatory action taken to secure first-options in maximising future gain and/or minimising loss. Prediction of gain/ loss scenarios can increasingly harness AI analytics and predictive systems designed to maximize collaborative intelligence. Other collaborative intelligence applications include the study of social media and policing, harnessing computational approaches to enhance collaborative action between residents and law enforcement. In their Harvard Business Review essay, Collaborative Intelligence: Humans and AI Are Joining Forces – Humans and machines can enhance each other's strengths, authors H. James Wilson and Paul R. Daugherty report on research involving 1,500 firms in a range of industries, showing that the biggest performance improvements occur when humans and smart machines work together, enhancing each other's strengths.

== History ==
Collaborative intelligence traces its roots to the Pandemonium Architecture proposed by artificial intelligence pioneer Oliver Selfridge as a paradigm for learning. His concept was a precursor for the blackboard system where an opportunistic solution space, or blackboard, draws from a range of partitioned knowledge sources, as multiple players assemble a jigsaw puzzle, each contributing a piece. Rodney Brooks notes that the blackboard model specifies how knowledge is posted to a blackboard for general sharing, but not how knowledge is retrieved, typically hiding from the consumer of knowledge who originally produced which knowledge, so it would not qualify as a collaborative intelligence system.

In the late 1980s, Eshel Ben-Jacob began to study bacterial self-organization, believing that bacteria hold the key to understanding larger biological systems. He developed new pattern-forming bacteria species, Paenibacillus vortex and Paenibacillus dendritiformis, and became a pioneer in the study of social behaviors of bacteria. P. dendritiformis manifests a collective faculty, which could be viewed as a precursor of collaborative intelligence, the ability to switch between different morphotypes to adapt with the environment. Ants were first characterized by entomologist W. M. Wheeler as cells of a single "superorganism" where seemingly independent individuals can cooperate so closely as to become indistinguishable from a single organism. Later research characterized some insect colonies as instances of collective intelligence. The concept of ant colony optimization algorithms, introduced by Marco Dorigo, became a dominant theory of evolutionary computation. The mechanisms of evolution through which species adapt toward increased functional effectiveness in their ecosystems are the foundation for principles of collaborative intelligence.

Artificial Swarm Intelligence (ASI) is a real-time technology that enables networked human groups to efficiently combine their knowledge, wisdom, insights, and intuitions into an emergent intelligence. Sometimes referred to as a "hive mind," the first real-time human swarms were deployed by Unanimous A.I. using a cloud-based server called "UNU" in 2014. It enables online groups to answer questions, reach decisions, and make predictions by thinking together as a unified intelligence. This process has been shown to produce significantly improved decisions, predictions, estimations, and forecasts, as demonstrated when predicting major events such as the Kentucky Derby, the Oscars, the Stanley Cup, Presidential Elections, and the World Series.

A type of collaborative AI was the focus of a DARPA Artificial Intelligence Exploration (AIE) Program from 2021 to 2023. Named Shared Experience Lifelong Learning, the program aimed to develop a population of agents capable of sharing a growing number of machine-learned tasks without forgetting. The vision behind this initiative was later elaborated in a Perspective in Nature Machine Intelligence, which proposed a synergy between lifelong learning and the sharing of machine-learned knowledge in populations of agents. The envisioned network of AI agents promises to bring about emergent properties such as faster and more efficient learning, a higher degree of open-ended learning, and a potentially more democratic society of AI agents, in contrast to monolithic, large-scale AI systems. These research developments were deemed to implement concepts inspired by sci-fi concepts such as the Borg from Star Trek, however, featuring more appealing characteristics such as individuality and autonomy.

Crowdsourcing evolved from anonymous collective intelligence and is evolving toward credited, open source, collaborative intelligence applications that harness social networks. Evolutionary biologist Ernst Mayr noted that competition among individuals would not contribute to species evolution if individuals were typologically identical. Individual differences are a prerequisite for evolution. This evolutionary principle corresponds to the principle of collaborative autonomy in collaborative intelligence, which is a prerequisite for next generation platforms for crowd-sourcing. Following are examples of crowdsourced experiments with attributes of collaborative intelligence:

- SwarmSketch is a crowd-sourced art experiment.
- Galaxy Zoo is a citizen science project led by Chris Lintott at Oxford University to tap human pattern recognition capacities to catalog galaxies.
- DARPA Network Challenge explores how the Internet and social networking can support timely communication, wide-area team-building, and urgent mobilization to solve broad-scope, time-critical problems.
- Climate CoLab, spun out of MIT and its Center for Collective Intelligence.
- reCAPTCHA is a project to digitize books, one word at a time

As crowdsourcing evolves from basic pattern recognition tasks to toward collaborative intelligence, tapping the unique expertise of individual contributors in social networks, constraints guide evolution toward increased functional effectiveness, co-evolving with systems to tag, credit, time-stamp, and sort content. Collaborative intelligence requires capacity for effective search, discovery, integration, visualization, and frameworks to support collaborative problem-solving.

The collaborative intelligence technology category was established in 2022 by MURAL, a software provider of interactive whiteboard collaboration spaces for group ideation and problem-solving. MURAL formalized the collaborative intelligence category through the acquisition of LUMA Institute, an organization that trains people to be collaborative problem solvers through teaching human-centered design. The collaborative intelligence technology category is described by MURAL as combining "collaboration design with collaboration spaces and emerging Collaboration Insights™️ ... to enable and amplify the potential of the team."

=== Contrast with collective intelligence ===
The term collective intelligence originally encompassed both collective and collaborative intelligence, and many systems manifest attributes of both. Pierre Lévy coined the term "collective intelligence" in his book of that title, first published in French in 1994. Lévy defined "collective intelligence" to encompass both collective and collaborative intelligence: "a form of universally distributed intelligence, constantly enhanced, coordinated in real time, and in the effective mobilization of skills". Following publication of Lévy's book, computer scientists adopted the term collective intelligence to denote an application within the more general area to which this term now applies in computer science. Specifically, an application that processes input from a large number of discrete responders to specific, generally quantitative, questions (e.g. what will the price of DRAM be next year?) Algorithms homogenize input, maintaining the traditional anonymity of survey responders to generate better-than-average predictions.

Recent dependency network studies suggest links between collective and collaborative intelligence. Partial correlation-based Dependency Networks, a new class of correlation-based networks, have been shown to uncover hidden relationships between the nodes of the network. Research by Dror Y. Kenett and his Ph.D. supervisor Eshel Ben-Jacob uncovered hidden information about the underlying structure of the U.S. stock market that was not present in the standard correlation networks, and published their findings in 2011.

== Application ==
Collaborative intelligence addresses problems where individual expertise, potentially conflicting priorities of stakeholders, and different interpretations of diverse experts are critical for problem-solving. Potential future applications include:

- competitions, where submissions must be integrated to produce a synergistic outcome;
- smart search, where social networks of searchers on related topics co-define search results;
- professional groups, interest collectives, citizen science and other communities, where knowledge-sharing is a prerequisite for effective outcomes;
- planning, development, and sustainable project management;
- smart systems to transform independent cities into collaborative, ecological urban networks

Wikipedia, one of the most popular websites on the Internet, is an exemplar of an innovation network manifesting distributed collaborative intelligence that illustrates principles for experimental business laboratories and start-up accelerators.

A new generation of tools to support collaborative intelligence is poised to evolve from crowdsourcing platforms, recommender systems, and evolutionary computation. Existing tools to facilitate group problem-solving include collaborative groupware, synchronous conferencing technologies such as instant messaging, online chat, and shared white boards, which are complemented by asynchronous messaging like electronic mail, threaded, moderated discussion forums, web logs, and group Wikis. Managing the Intelligent Enterprise relies on these tools, as well as methods for group member interaction; promotion of creative thinking; group membership feedback; quality control and peer review; and a documented group memory or knowledge base. As groups work together, they develop a shared memory, which is accessible through the collaborative artifacts created by the group, including meeting minutes, transcripts from threaded discussions, and drawings. The shared memory (group memory) is also accessible through the memories of group members; current interest focuses on how technology can support and augment the effectiveness of shared past memory and capacity for future problem-solving. Metaknowledge characterizes how knowledge content interacts with its knowledge context in cross-disciplinary, multi-institutional, or global distributed collaboration.

== See also ==
- Cloud collaboration
- Collaborative innovation network
- Collaborative learning
- Collective problem solving
- Distributed cognition
- Global brain
- Mass collaboration
- Mass communication
- Social epistemology
