= Paenibacillus tylopili =

Scientific classification
- Domain: Bacteria
- Kingdom: Bacillati
- Phylum: Bacillota
- Class: Bacilli
- Order: Paenibacillales
- Family: Paenibacillaceae
- Genus: Paenibacillus
- Species: P. tylopili

Binomial name
- Paenibacillus tylopili Kuisiene et al. 2008

Species of bacterium

Paenibacillus tylopili is a soil-dwelling, Gram-positive, rod-shaped bacterium. Described in 2008, it was found in the mycorhizosphere of the bolete fungus Tylopilus felleus.

== Description ==
The Gram-positive cells are rod-shaped, with dimensions of 3.0–5.9 μm long by 1.2–1.6 μm wide. Swollen sporangia produce oval endospores. It has an optimal growth temperature of 25 °C (77 °F), with a minimum of 9 °C (48 °F). Its optimum growth pH is 8.0, but can grow in the range 6.0–9.0. It is a facultative anaerobe. When cultured for two days at 25 °C (77 °F) on agar plates containing trypticase soy agar growth medium, the resulting colonies are whitish and somewhat translucent and glossy, round and slightly raised off the surface, measuring 1–2 mm in diameter.

In standard tests of physiological characteristics, the bacterium was able to hydrolyse starch, but not casein nor gelatin, and it was able to produce acid from both of the sugars lactose and raffinose. It does not have the ability to reduce nitrate.

Molecular analysis of 16S ribosomal RNA gene sequences shows the species to be closely related to Paenibacillus amylolyticus, P. pabuli and P. xylanilyticus. In 2011, a novel strain of Paenibacillus, named P118, isolated from the gut of the tropical fish Parotocinclus maculicauda, was reported to be closely related to P. tylopili based on 16S rRNA gene sequence similarity. Like all members of the genus Paenibacillus, its predominant fatty acid is anteiso-C15:0 (a straight chain of 15 carbon atoms, without any double bonds). Other abundant fatty acids are iso-C16:0, iso-C15:0 and n-C16:0. The bacterium has a GC-content of 44.3%. Its cell wall contains the diamino acid meso-2,6-diaminopimelic acid.

== Ecology ==
Paenibacillus tylopili can degrade the polymer chitin, a major component of fungal cell walls. It lacks the ability to break down N-acetylglucosamine.
