= Sporolactobacillaceae =

Scientific classification
- Domain: Bacteria
- Kingdom: Bacillati
- Phylum: Bacillota
- Class: Bacilli
- Order: Bacillales
- Family: Sporolactobacillaceae; Garrity et al. 2001

Genera
- Caenibacillus; Camelliibacillus; Pullulanibacillus; Scopulibacillus; Sporolactobacillus; Terrilactibacillus; Tuberibacillus

Family of bacteria

The Sporolactobacillaceae are a family of Gram-positive bacteria including the genera Sporolactobacillus and Tuberibacillus.

== Phylogeny ==
The currently accepted taxonomy is based on the List of Prokaryotic names with Standing in Nomenclature (LPSN) and National Center for Biotechnology Information (NCBI).

16S rRNA based LTP_10_2024

- Sporolactobacillaceae
  - - - Pullulanibacillus pueri
      - - Pullulanibacillus camelliae
        - Camelliibacillus Lin, Yan & Yi 2018
    - - Tuberibacillus Hatayama et al. 2006
      - Pullulanibacillus Hatayama et al. 2006
  - - Scopulibacillus daqui
    - - Scopulibacillus Lee & Lee 2015
      - - - Caenibacillus Tsujimoto et al. 2016
          - Terrilactibacillus Prasirtsak et al. 2016
        - Sporolactobacillus (Kitahara & Suzuki 1963) Kitahara & Lai 1967

120 marker proteins based GTDB 09-RS220

- Sporolactobacillaceae
  - - - Caenibacillus
      - Tuberibacillus
    - Pullulanibacillus
  - - Scopulibacillus
    - - Terrilactibacillus
      - Sporolactobacillus
