= Cohnella hongkongensis =

Scientific classification
- Domain: Bacteria
- Kingdom: Bacillati
- Phylum: Bacillota
- Class: Bacilli
- Order: Bacillales
- Family: Paenibacillaceae
- Genus: Cohnella
- Species: C. hongkongensis

Binomial name
- Cohnella hongkongensis Kämpfer et al. 2006

Species of bacterium

Cohnella hongkongensis, formerly known as Paenibacillus hongkongensis, is a species in the bacterial genus Cohnella. It is Gram-positive, rod-shaped and endospore-forming, with type strain HKU3^{T} (=CCUG 49571^{T} =CIP 107898^{T} =DSM 17642^{T}).
