= Paenibacillus lentimorbus =

Scientific classification
- Domain: Bacteria
- Kingdom: Bacillati
- Phylum: Bacillota
- Class: Bacilli
- Order: Caryophanales
- Family: Paenibacillaceae
- Genus: Paenibacillus
- Species: P. lentimorbus

Binomial name
- Paenibacillus lentimorbus (Dutky 1940) Pettersson et al. 1999

Synonyms
- Bacillus lentimorbus Dutky 1940 (Approved Lists 1980)

Species of bacterium

Paenibacillus lentimorbus is a Gram-positive bacterium used as a soil or plant inoculant in agriculture and horticulture. It is the causative agent of Milky disease in some scarab beetle larvae. It was formerly classified in the genus Bacillus.
