= Paenibacillus macerans =

Scientific classification
- Domain: Bacteria
- Kingdom: Bacillati
- Phylum: Bacillota
- Class: Bacilli
- Order: Caryophanales
- Family: Paenibacillaceae
- Genus: Paenibacillus
- Species: P. macerans

Binomial name
- Paenibacillus macerans (Schardinger 1905) Ash et al. 1994

Synonyms
- Bacillus macerans Schardinger 1905 Aerobacillus macerans Donker 1926; Zymobacillus macerans Kluyver and van Niel 1936; Bactrillum macerans Pribram 1933; Bacillus acetoethylicum Northrop et al. 1919; Bacillus betanigrificans Cameron et al. 1936; Bacillus soli Alerie and Gray 1947; Aerobacillus schuylkilliensis Eisenberg 1942; Bacillus vagans Alarie and Gray 1947

Species of bacterium

Paenibacillus macerans is a diazotroph bacterium found in soil and plants capable of nitrogen fixation and fermentation. This bacteria was originally discovered in 1905 by an Austrian biologist named Schardinger and thought to be a bacillus.

== Characteristics ==
Paenibacillus macerans is a part of the family Paenibacillaceae which are facultative anaerobes. It is gram-variable, being gram-positive or gram-negative rods. Does not have a capsule and has peritrichous flagella for movement. It does form ellipsoidal, terminal, or subterminal spores which may last in the soil for many years.

== Growth conditions ==
Paenibacillus. macerans can be grown in the lab on a nutrient agar with a slightly acidic pH around 5. Optimal growth temperature is 30 °C. No growth in 5% NaCl.

== Metabolic capabilities ==
Paenibacillus. macerans has been shown to have some of the broadest metabolic capabilities of any of the genus Paenibacillus. It is able to ferment hexoses, deoxyhexoses, pentoses, cellulose, hemicellulose and glycerol under anaerobic conditions. The high fermentation rates of glycerol makes this an important organism in the study of fuel and chemical production. P. macerans also produces a significant amount of histamines which may cause allergies in some individuals if ingested. This bacterium is a facultative anaerobe capable of nitrogen fixation so in the absence of oxygen it is able to convert nitrogen gas to ammonia which is more easily used by plants.

== Ecology ==
Paenibacillus macerans is usually found in soil and plant materials but has also been identified in blood cultures of infants with infection. The bacterium is not normally pathogenic in humans but could cause allergies as a result of its histamine producing properties.
