= Cohnella thermotolerans =

Scientific classification
- Domain: Bacteria
- Kingdom: Bacillati
- Phylum: Bacillota
- Class: Bacilli
- Order: Bacillales
- Family: Paenibacillaceae
- Genus: Cohnella
- Species: C. thermotolerans

Binomial name
- Cohnella thermotolerans Kämpfer et al. 2006

Species of bacterium

Cohnella thermotolerans is the type species of the bacterial genus Cohnella. It is Gram-positive, rod-shaped and endospore-forming, with type strain CCUG 47242^{T} (=CIP 108492^{T} =DSM 17683^{T}).
