= Ammoniphilus oxalivorans =

Scientific classification
- Domain: Bacteria
- Kingdom: Bacillati
- Phylum: Bacillota
- Class: Bacilli
- Order: Paenibacillales
- Family: Paenibacillaceae
- Genus: Ammoniphilus
- Species: A. oxalivorans

Binomial name
- Ammoniphilus oxalivorans Zaitsev et al. 1998

Type strain
- ATCC 700648, CIP 105539, DSM 11537, HAMBI 2284, RAOx-FS

Species of bacterium

Ammoniphilus oxalivorans is a Gram-variable, spore-forming, haloalkalitolerant, rod-shaped, aerobic, obligately oxalotrophic and motile bacteria from the genus of Ammoniphilus with peritrichous flagella which has been isolated from the rhizosphere of the plant Rumex acetosa from a public garden in Helsinki in Finland.
