= Inzopa =

Inzopa, Inc.
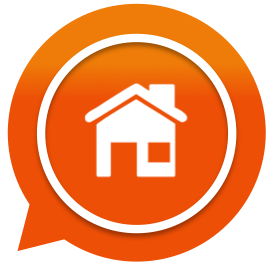
- Company type: Private
- Available in: English
- Headquarters: Fremont, California United States
- Founders: Charanjeet Ajmani, Brian Barrick
- Key people: Charanjeet Ajmani (CEO), Brian Barrick (CTO)
- Website: inzopa.com
- Registration: Required
- Launched: December 2010
- Current status: Dead

Inzopa was an American private financial data network that stored financial data for shared financial services. The network was primarily used by homebuyers, homeowners, and banks for real estate and mortgage transactions.

Inzopa did not charge consumers, but financial institutions and professionals had to pay a fee. The firm used crowdsourcing to aggregate mortgage broker and real estate data to build authenticated profiles and matches agents and brokers to homebuyers.

== History ==
Inzopa was co-founded by Charanjeet Ajmani, an executive at Advisor Software, and Brian Barrick, architect and team leader of Apple's FileMaker team in December 2010.

The site was launched in February 2014. Inzopa competed against online loan sites such as LendingTree.

The website was closed down in 2017.
