= Paenibacillus koreensis =

Scientific classification
- Domain: Bacteria
- Kingdom: Bacillati
- Phylum: Bacillota
- Class: Bacilli
- Order: Paenibacillales
- Family: Paenibacillaceae
- Genus: Paenibacillus
- Species: P. koreensis

Binomial name
- Paenibacillus koreensis Chung et al., 2000

Species of bacterium

Paenibacillus koreensis is a bacterium. It produces an iturin-like antifungal antibiotic. It is facultatively anaerobic and its type strain is YC300T (= KCTC 2393T, KCCM 40903T).
