= Aneurinibacillus soli =

Scientific classification
- Domain: Bacteria
- Kingdom: Bacillati
- Phylum: Bacillota
- Class: Bacilli
- Order: Paenibacillales
- Family: Paenibacillaceae
- Genus: Aneurinibacillus
- Species: A. soli

Binomial name
- Aneurinibacillus soli Lee et al. 2014

Type strain
- CB4

Species of bacterium

Aneurinibacillus soli is a Gram-positive, aerobic, rod-shaped and motile bacterium from the genus Aneurinibacillus which has been isolated from soil from the mountain Hallasan.
