= Aneurinibacillus migulanus =

Scientific classification
- Domain: Bacteria
- Kingdom: Bacillati
- Phylum: Bacillota
- Class: Bacilli
- Order: Paenibacillales
- Family: Paenibacillaceae
- Genus: Aneurinibacillus
- Species: A. migulanus

Binomial name
- Aneurinibacillus migulanus (Takagi et al. 1993) Shida et al. 1996

Synonyms
- Bacillus migulanus

Species of bacterium

Aneurinibacillus migulanus is a bacterium from the genus Aneurinibacillus. Aneurinibacillus migulanus produces the antibiotic Gramicidin S. Genome size of Aneurinibacillus migulanus strain TP115 is 5,556,554 bp.
