= Ammoniphilus =

Ammoniphilus oxalaticus

Scientific classification
- Domain: Bacteria
- Kingdom: Bacillati
- Phylum: Bacillota
- Class: Bacilli
- Order: Paenibacillales
- Family: Paenibacillaceae
- Genus: Ammoniphilus; Zaitsev et al. 1998

Type species
- Ammoniphilus oxalaticus Zaitsev et al. 1998

Species
- A. oxalaticus; A. oxalivorans; A. resinae

Genus of bacteria

Ammoniphilus is a Gram-variable, strictly aerobic, rod-shaped, haloalkalitolerant spore-forming, obligately oxalotrophic and motile bacterial genus from the family of Paenibacillaceae with peritrichous flagella. In the cell wall of Ammoniphilus is meso-diaminopimelic acid.

== Phylogeny ==
The currently accepted taxonomy is based on the List of Prokaryotic names with Standing in Nomenclature (LPSN) and National Center for Biotechnology Information (NCBI)

16S rRNA based LTP_10_2024

- Ammoniphilus
  - A. resinae Lin et al. 2016
  - - A. oxalaticus Zaitsev et al. 1998
    - A. oxalivorans Zaitsev et al. 1998

120 marker proteins based GTDB 09-RS220

- Ammoniphilus
  - A. resinae
  - A. oxalaticus

== See also ==
- List of bacterial orders
- List of bacteria genera
