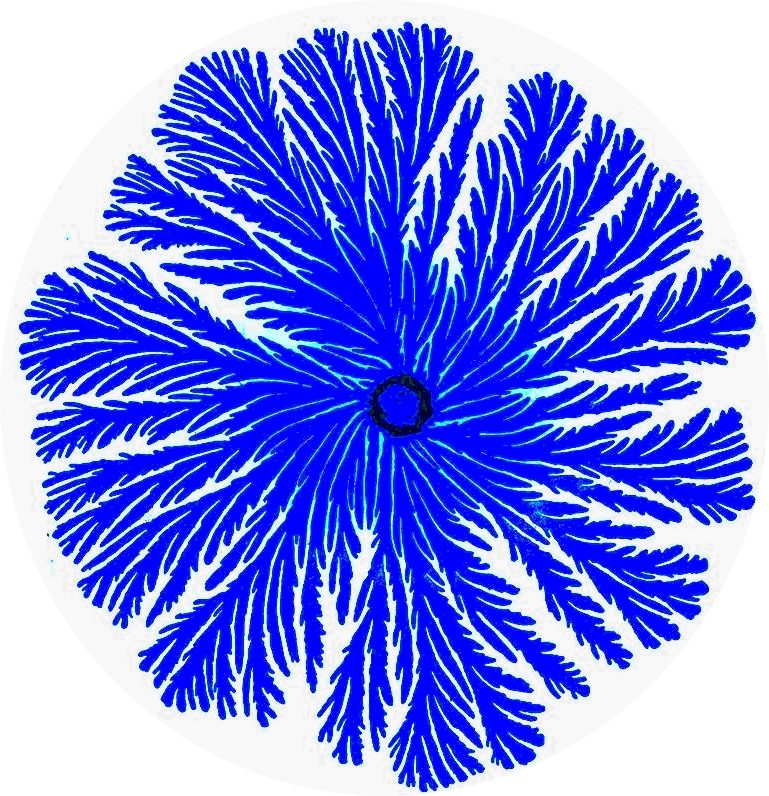
- Figure 1: A colony generated by the Branching (Tip splitting) morphotype bacteria of P. dendritiformis. The colony diameter is 6cm and the colors indicate the bacteria density (darker shade for higher density).

Scientific classification
- Domain: Bacteria
- Kingdom: Bacillati
- Phylum: Bacillota
- Class: Bacilli
- Order: Paenibacillales
- Family: Paenibacillaceae
- Genus: Paenibacillus
- Species: P. stellifer

Binomial name
- Paenibacillus stellifer (Ash et al., 1994)

= Paenibacillus dendritiformis =

Species of bacterium

Paenibacillus dendritiformis is a species of pattern-forming bacteria, first discovered in the early 90s by Eshel Ben-Jacob's group. It is a social microorganism that forms colonies with complex and dynamic architectures. The genus Paenibacillus comprises facultative anaerobic, endospore-forming bacteria originally included within the genus Bacillus and then reclassified as a separate genus in 1993. Bacteria belonging to this genus have been detected in a variety of environments such as: soil, water, rhizosphere, vegetable matter, forage and insect larvae.

== Paenibacillus spp. ==
In recent years there is an increasing interest in studies of Paenibacillus spp. since many were found to be important for industrial, agricultural and medical applications. These bacteria produce various extracellular enzymes such as polysaccharide-degrading enzymes and proteases, which can catalyze a wide variety of synthetic reactions in fields ranging from cosmetics to biofuel production. Various Paenibacillus spp. also produce antimicrobial substances that affect a wide spectrum of micro-organisms such as fungi, soil bacteria, plant pathogenic bacteria and even important anaerobic pathogens as Clostridium botulinium.

== Pattern formation, self-organization and social behaviors ==
P. dendritiformis is a social microorganism: when grown under growth conditions that mimic natural environments such as hard surfaces, it forms colonies of 10^{9}-10^{12} cells with remarkably complex and dynamic architectures (Figure 1). Being part of a large cooperative, the bacteria can better compete for food resources and be protected against antibacterial assaults. The P. dendritiformis exhibit many distinct physiological and genetic traits including β-galactosidase-like activity causing colonies to turn blue on X-gal plates and multiple drug resistance (MDR) (including septrin, penicillin, kanamycin, chloramphenicol, ampicillin, tetracycline, spectinomycin, streptomycin and mitomycin C. Colonies that are grown on surfaces in Petri dishes exhibit several folds higher drug resistance in comparison to growth in liquid media. This particular resistance is believed to be due to a surfactant-like liquid front that actually forms a particular pattern on the Petri plate.

Similar to other social bacteria Paenibacillus species, P. dendritiformis can form complex patterns on semi-solid surfaces. Development of such complex colonies require self-organization and cooperative behavior of individual cells while employing sophisticated chemical communication. Pattern formation and self-organization in microbial systems is an intriguing phenomenon, reflection social behaviors of bacteria that might provide insights into the evolutionary development of the collective action of cells in higher organisms.

P. dendritiformis colonies behave much like a multi-cellular organism, with cell differentiation and task distribution. Accomplishing such intricate cooperative ventures requires sophisticated cell-cell communication including semantic and pragmatic aspects of linguistics.

Communicating with each other using a variety of chemical signals, bacteria exchange information regarding population size, a myriad of individual environmental measurements at different locations, their internal states and their phenotypic and epigenetic adjustments. The bacteria collectively sense the environment and execute distributed information processing to glean and assess relevant information. The information is then used by the bacteria for reshaping the colony while redistributing tasks and cell epigenetic differentiations, for collective decision-making and for turning on and off defense and offense mechanisms needed to thrive in competitive environments, faculties that can be perceived as social intelligence of bacteria.

== Morphotype transition ==
The P. dendritiformis, poses an intriguing collective faculty – the ability to switch between different morphotypes to better adapt in complex environments. Mostly studied is the transition between the Branching (or tip-splitting) morphotype (Figure 1) and the Chiral morphotype (Figure 2) that is marked by curly branches with well defined handedness.

The morphotype transition (Figure 3), can be viewed as an identity switching – the calls can cooperatively make drastic alterations of their internal genomic state, effectively transforming themselves into differently looking and behaving cells which can generate colonies with entirely different organization. Under conditions somewhat more favorable to motion, such as growth on a softer substrate, the bacteria engineer classes of chiral colony patterns in which the branches are thinner and curl in the same direction (Figure 2). Accompanying the colonial structure is a designed genome change: the bacteria are now programmed to become longer and have multiple chromosomes. The morphotype transition are both inheritable - the identity is maintained during LB growth and even through sporulation/germination, and reversible – for example the reverse transitions from chiral to ordinary branching occur on harder substrates (when higher bacteria densities are required to produce sufficient amounts of lubrication). Optical microscope observations during colony development reveal the following: upon elongation, the cells alter their collective movement from the typical run-and-tumble to a coordinated forward-backward movement with limited tumbling.

== Genome sequence ==
The genome sequence of the P. dendritiformis can be downloaded on the NCBI website here, or genetic information can be received upon request from the Tauber Sequencing Initiative at Tel-Aviv University, Israel. The genome was sequenced by a hybrid approach using 454 Life Sciences and Illumina, achieving a total of 340X coverage, with 99.8% sequence identity between the two methods. Preliminary analysis of the P. dendritiformis genome (approximate size of 6.6Mbp) revealed 6,782 open reading frames (ORFs). The analysis also unveiled the P. dendritiformis potential to produces a wealth of enzymes and proteases as well as a great variety of antimicrobial substances that affect a wide range of microorganisms. The possession of these advanced defense and offense strategies render P. dendritiformis as a rich source of useful genes for agricultural, medical, industrial and biofuel applications.

== Competition between sibling bacterial colonies ==
In 2000 it was discovered, that two sibling colonies (colonies taken from the same mother colony or from the same LB growth) of the P. dendritiformis inoculated side by side can inhibit the growth of one another (Figure 4). Recent detailed studies of the phenomenon in the branching morphotype, revealed that the two colonies not only inhibit each other from growing into the territory between them but induced the death of those cells close to the border. Material extracted from the agar gel between two colonies was found to kill single growing colonies. By employing molecular biology methods combined with the new genome sequencing information and bioinformatics, they discovered a new toxin (sibling lethal factor), which acts selectively only on the same bacterial strain. The findings suggest a new strategy for fighting bacteria by self-toxins they produce.

== See also ==
- Paenibacillus vortex
- Genus Paenibacillus
