= Saccharibacillus qingshengii =

Scientific classification
- Domain: Bacteria
- Kingdom: Bacillati
- Phylum: Bacillota
- Class: Bacilli
- Order: Paenibacillales
- Family: Paenibacillaceae
- Genus: Saccharibacillus
- Species: S. qingshengii

Binomial name
- Saccharibacillus qingshengii Han et al. 2016

Type strain
- CCTCC AB 2016001, JCM 31172, strain H6

Species of bacterium

Saccharibacillus qingshengii is a Gram-positive, rod-shaped and strictly aerobic bacteria from the genus Saccharibacillus which has been isolated from soil from a lead-cadmium tailing from Qixia District in China.
