= S. laevis =

S. laevis may refer to:

- Scleria laevis, the smooth scleria, a flowering plant species in the genus Scleria
- Serrata laevis, a sea snail species
- Shorea laevis, a plant species found in Indonesia, Malaysia, Myanmar and Thailand
- Sporolactobacillus laevis, an anaerobic Gram-positive bacterium species in the genus Sporolactobacillus
- Stokesia laevis, a flowering plant species native to southeastern North America
- Symphonia laevis, a tropical woody plant species in the genus Symphonia
- Symplecta laevis, a crane fly species in the genus Symplecta

== See also ==
- List of Latin and Greek words commonly used in systematic names#L
