= Paenibacillus vulneris =

Scientific classification
- Domain: Bacteria
- Kingdom: Bacillati
- Phylum: Bacillota
- Class: Bacilli
- Order: Paenibacillales
- Family: Paenibacillaceae
- Genus: Paenibacillus
- Species: P. vulneris

Binomial name
- Paenibacillus vulneris Glaeser et al. 2012

Species of bacterium

Paenibacillus vulneris is a Gram-positive, rod-shaped, spore-forming bacterium. Strains of this species were originally isolated from a necrotic wound on a human.
