= Aneurinibacillus tyrosinisolvens =

Scientific classification
- Domain: Bacteria
- Kingdom: Bacillati
- Phylum: Bacillota
- Class: Bacilli
- Order: Paenibacillales
- Family: Paenibacillaceae
- Genus: Aneurinibacillus
- Species: A. tyrosinisolvens

Binomial name
- Aneurinibacillus tyrosinisolvens Tsubouchi et al. 2015

Type strain
- LL-002

Species of bacterium

Aneurinibacillus tyrosinisolvens is a Gram-positive, strictly aerobic and heterotrophic bacterium from the genus Aneurinibacillus which has been isolated from seafloor sediments from the Kagoshima Bay.
