= Paenibacillus durus =

Scientific classification
- Domain: Bacteria
- Kingdom: Bacillati
- Phylum: Bacillota
- Class: Bacilli
- Order: Paenibacillales
- Family: Paenibacillaceae
- Genus: Paenibacillus
- Species: P. durus

Binomial name
- Paenibacillus durus (Smith and Cato 1974) Collins et al. 1994

Synonyms
- Clostridium durum Smith and Cato 1974; Paenibacillus durum (Smith and Cato 1974) Collins et al. 1994; Paenibacillus azotofixans Seldin et al. 1984

Species of bacterium

Paenibacillus durus is a bacterial species belonging to the Bacillota.
