= Aneurinibacillus sediminis =

Scientific classification
- Domain: Bacteria
- Kingdom: Bacillati
- Phylum: Bacillota
- Class: Bacilli
- Order: Paenibacillales
- Family: Paenibacillaceae
- Genus: Aneurinibacillus
- Species: A. sediminis

Binomial name
- Aneurinibacillus sediminis Subhash et al. 2017

Type strain
- 1-10M-8-7-50

Species of bacterium

Aneurinibacillus sediminis is a Gram-positive, spore-forming, obligately aerobic, rod-shaped and motile bacterium from the genus Aneurinibacillus which has been isolated from sediments of a lagoon.
