= Saccharibacillus =

Scientific classification
- Domain: Bacteria
- Kingdom: Bacillati
- Phylum: Bacillota
- Class: Bacilli
- Order: Caryophanales
- Family: Paenibacillaceae
- Genus: Saccharibacillus; Rivas et al. 2008

Type species
- Saccharibacillus sacchari Rivas et al. 2008

Species
- "S. alkalitolerans"; "S. brassicae"; S. deserti; S. endophyticus; S. kuerlensis; S. qingshengii; S. sacchari

Genus of bacteria

Saccharibacillus is a genus of bacteria from the family Paenibacillaceae.

== Phylogeny ==
The currently accepted taxonomy is based on the List of Prokaryotic names with Standing in Nomenclature (LPSN) and National Center for Biotechnology Information (NCBI).

16S rRNA based LTP_10_2024

- Saccharibacillus
  - S. endophyticus
  - - - S. kuerlensis
      - S. sacchari
    - - S. deserti
      - S. qingshengii

120 marker proteins based GTDB 09-RS220

- Saccharibacillus
  - - "S. brassicae" Jiang et al. 2020
    - - S. deserti Sun et al. 2016
      - S. qingshengii Han et al. 2016
  - - - "S. alkalitolerans" Darji et al. 2021
      - S. kuerlensis Yang et al. 2009
    - - S. endophyticus Kämpfer et al. 2016
      - S. sacchari Rivas et al. 2008
