= Ammoniphilus resinae =

Scientific classification
- Domain: Bacteria
- Kingdom: Bacillati
- Phylum: Bacillota
- Class: Bacilli
- Order: Paenibacillales
- Family: Paenibacillaceae
- Genus: Ammoniphilus
- Species: A. resinae

Binomial name
- Ammoniphilus resinae Lin et al. 2016

Type strain
- BCRC 80314, DSM 24738, strain CC-RT-E

Species of bacterium

Ammoniphilus resinae is a Gram-variable, endospore-forming and facultatively anaerobic bacteria from the genus of Ammoniphilus which has been isolated from aged resin from a tropical rainforest in Indonesia.
