= Xanthan lyase =

xanthan lyase

Identifiers
- EC no.: 4.2.2.12
- CAS no.: 113573-69-6

Databases
- IntEnz: IntEnz view
- BRENDA: BRENDA entry
- ExPASy: NiceZyme view
- KEGG: KEGG entry
- MetaCyc: metabolic pathway
- PRIAM: profile
- PDB structures: RCSB PDB PDBe PDBsum
- Gene Ontology: AmiGO / QuickGO
Search
- PMC: articles
- PubMed: articles
- NCBI: proteins

The enzyme xanthan lyase (EC 4.2.2.12) catalyzes the following process:

Eliminative cleavage of the terminal β-D-mannosyl-(1→4)-β-D-glucuronosyl linkage of the side-chain of the polysaccharide xanthan, leaving a 4-deoxy-α-L-threo-hex-4-enuronosyl group at the terminus of the side-chain

It belongs to the family of lyases, specifically those carbon-oxygen lyases acting on polysaccharides. Xanthan lyase was first identified and partially purified in 1987.

Xanthan is a polysaccharide secreted by several different bacterial taxa, such as the plant pathogen Xanthomonas campestris, and it consists of a main linear chain based on cellulose with side chains attached to alternate glucosyl (glucose) residues. These side chains contain three monosaccharide residues. Xanthan lyase is produced by bacteria that degrade this polysaccharide, such as Bacillus, Corynebacterium, Bacteroides, Ruminococcaceae, and Paenibacillus species.

== Industrial applications ==
Xanthan is used in industry as a thickening agent in foods and drinks, as a stabilizing agent for foams, as a means of enhancing oil recovery and in the manufacture of good such as paints, cosmetics and explosives. The use of xanthan lyase as a means of altering the physical properties of xanthans is an area of current research in biotechnology.

== Structural studies ==
As of late 2007, 7 structures have been solved for this class of enzymes, with PDB accession codes 1J0M, 1J0N, 1X1H, 1X1I, 1X1J, 2E22, and 2E24. The enzyme from Bacillus is a monomer consisting of two domains: an alpha helical N-terminal domain, and a C-terminal domain composed of beta sheets. The active site is a deep cleft located between these two domains.
