= Α,α-phosphotrehalase =

Class of enzymes

α,α-Phosphotrehalase

Identifiers
- EC no.: 3.2.1.93
- CAS no.: 54576-93-1

Databases
- BRENDA: enzyme data
- ExPASy: NiceZyme view
- KEGG: enzyme entry
- MetaCyc: metabolic pathway
- Rhea: reactions
- PDB structures: RCSB PDB PDBe PDBsum
- Gene Ontology: AmiGO / QuickGO
Search
- PMC: articles
- PubMed: articles
- NCBI: proteins

The enzyme α,α-phosphotrehalase (EC 3.2.1.93) catalyzes the following chemical reaction:

α,α-trehalose 6-phosphate
H_{2}O
glucose 6-phosphate
+
D-glucose

The enzyme characterised from Bacillus popilliae hydrolyses α,α-trehalose 6-phosphate to D-glucose 6-phosphate and D-glucose. Trehalose is an osmoprotectant and the enzyme regulates its level in organisms such as Clostridium perfringens. The enzyme has been used to assay levels of trehalose 6-phosphate.

This enzyme is a hydrolase, specifically a glycosidase that hydrolyse O- and S-glycosyl compounds. The systematic name of this enzyme class is α,α-trehalose-6-phosphate phosphoglucohydrolase. This enzyme is also called phosphotrehalase.
