= Saccharibacillus deserti =

Scientific classification
- Domain: Bacteria
- Kingdom: Bacillati
- Phylum: Bacillota
- Class: Bacilli
- Order: Paenibacillales
- Family: Paenibacillaceae
- Genus: Saccharibacillus
- Species: S. deserti

Binomial name
- Saccharibacillus deserti Sun et al. 2016

Type strain
- CGMCC 1.15276, KCTC 33693, WLJ055

Species of bacterium

Saccharibacillus deserti is a Gram-positive and facultatively anaerobic bacteria from the genus Saccharibacillus which has been isolated from desert soil from Erdos in China.
