= Aneurinibacillus humi =

Scientific classification
- Domain: Bacteria
- Kingdom: Bacillati
- Phylum: Bacillota
- Class: Bacilli
- Order: Paenibacillales
- Family: Paenibacillaceae
- Genus: Aneurinibacillus
- Species: A. humi

Binomial name
- Aneurinibacillus humi Lee and Lee 2016

Type strain
- U33

Species of bacterium

Aneurinibacillus humi is a Gram-positive, spore-forming, aerobic and motile bacterium from the genus Aneurinibacillus which has been isolated from soil from Mykhailyky in Ukraine.
