= Saccharibacillus sacchari =

Scientific classification
- Domain: Bacteria
- Kingdom: Bacillati
- Phylum: Bacillota
- Class: Bacilli
- Order: Paenibacillales
- Family: Paenibacillaceae
- Genus: Saccharibacillus
- Species: S. sacchari

Binomial name
- Saccharibacillus sacchari Rivas et al. 2008

Type strain
- DSM 19268, LMG 24085, strain GR21

Species of bacterium

Saccharibacillus sacchari is a Gram-variable, rod-shaped, and facultatively anaerobic bacterium from the genus Saccharibacillus, which has been isolated from the plant Saccharum officinarum.
