= Oxalophagus oxalicus =

Scientific classification
- Domain: Bacteria
- Kingdom: Bacillati
- Phylum: Bacillota
- Class: Bacilli
- Order: Paenibacillales
- Family: Paenibacillaceae
- Genus: Oxalophagus
- Species: O. oxalicus

Binomial name
- Oxalophagus oxalicus (Dehning and Schink 1990) Collins et al. 1994

Synonyms
- Clostridium oxalicum

Species of bacterium

Oxalophagus oxalicus, previously known as Clostridium oxalicus, is a bacterium in the family of Paenibacillaceae.
