= Saccharibacillus endophyticus =

Scientific classification
- Domain: Bacteria
- Kingdom: Bacillati
- Phylum: Bacillota
- Class: Bacilli
- Order: Paenibacillales
- Family: Paenibacillaceae
- Genus: Saccharibacillus
- Species: S. endophyticus

Binomial name
- Saccharibacillus endophyticus Kämpfer et al. 2016

Type strain
- CCM 8702, LMG 29710, JM-1350

Species of bacterium

Saccharibacillus endophyticus is a Gram-positive, facultatively anaerobic and endospore-forming bacteria from the genus Saccharibacillus which has been isolated from the plant Gossypium hirsutum.
