= Saccharibacillus kuerlensis =

Scientific classification
- Domain: Bacteria
- Kingdom: Bacillati
- Phylum: Bacillota
- Class: Bacilli
- Order: Paenibacillales
- Family: Paenibacillaceae
- Genus: Saccharibacillus
- Species: S. kuerlensis

Binomial name
- Saccharibacillus kuerlensis Yang et al. 2009

Type strain
- CGMCC 1.6964, DSM 22868, JCM 14865, KCTC 13182, strain HR1

Species of bacterium

Saccharibacillus kuerlensis is a Gram-positive and aerobic bacteria from the genus Saccharibacillus which has been isolated from desert soil from the desert of Kuerle in China.
