= FDTC =

FDTC may refer to:

- DTDP-3-amino-3,6-dideoxy-alpha-D-galactopyranose 3-N-acetyltransferase, an enzyme
- Florence–Darlington Technical College
