= Aneurinibacillus danicus =

Scientific classification
- Domain: Bacteria
- Kingdom: Bacillati
- Phylum: Bacillota
- Class: Bacilli
- Order: Paenibacillales
- Family: Paenibacillaceae
- Genus: Aneurinibacillus
- Species: A. danicus

Binomial name
- Aneurinibacillus danicus Goto et al. 2004

Species of bacterium

Aneurinibacillus danicus is a bacterium from the genus Aneurinibacillus.
