= Aneurinibacillus terranovensis =

Scientific classification
- Domain: Bacteria
- Kingdom: Bacillati
- Phylum: Bacillota
- Class: Bacilli
- Order: Paenibacillales
- Family: Paenibacillaceae
- Genus: Aneurinibacillus
- Species: A. terranovensis

Binomial name
- Aneurinibacillus terranovensis Allan et al. 2005

Type strain
- Logan B-1599

Species of bacterium

Aneurinibacillus terranovensis is a thermoacidophilic, microaerophilic and motile bacterium from the genus Aneurinibacillus.
