= Caenibacillus =

Scientific classification
- Domain: Bacteria
- Kingdom: Bacillati
- Phylum: Bacillota
- Class: Bacilli
- Order: Bacillales
- Family: Sporolactobacillaceae
- Genus: Caenibacillus; Tsujimoto et al. 2016
- Species: C. caldisaponilyticus

Binomial name
- Caenibacillus caldisaponilyticus Tsujimoto et al. 2016

Genus of bacteria

Caenibacillus is a genus of bacteria from the family Sporolactobacillaceae with one known species, Caenibacillus caldisaponilyticus.
