= Paenibacterin =

Identifiers
CAS Number	1400801-10-6
3D model (JSmol)	Interactive image
ChEBI	CHEBI:219957
ChemSpider	78442854
PubChem CID	78319277
- InChI: InChI=1S/C79H145N17O17/c1-13-16-17-18-19-20-21-22-23-24-25-26-39-60(99)84-53(36-31-42-82)69(102)90-63(49(8)9)76(109)95-66-52(12)113-79(112)65(51(11)15-3)94-70(103)55(35-28-30-41-81)86-75(108)62(48(6)7)92-73(106)59-38-33-44-96(59)78(111)64(50(10)14-2)93-72(105)58(46-98)89-67(100)54(34-27-29-40-80)85-74(107)61(47(4)5)91-71(104)57(45-97)88-68(101)56(37-32-43-83)87-77(66)110/h47-59,61-66,97-98H,13-46,80-83H2,1-12H3,(H,84,99)(H,85,107)(H,86,108)(H,87,110)(H,88,101)(H,89,100)(H,90,102)(H,91,104)(H,92,106)(H,93,105)(H,94,103)(H,95,109)/t50-,51-,52+,53-,54-,55-,56-,57-,58-,59-,61-,62-,63-,64-,65-,66-/m0/s1 Key: GZPVAWHDCVFCAB-APSGCZIASA-N
- SMILES: CCCCCCCCCCCCCCC(=O)N[C@@H](CCCN)C(=O)N[C@@H](C(C)C)C(=O)N[C@H]1[C@H](OC(=O)[C@@H](NC(=O)[C@@H](NC(=O)[C@@H](NC(=O)[C@@H]2CCCN2C(=O)[C@@H](NC(=O)[C@@H](NC(=O)[C@@H](NC(=O)[C@@H](NC(=O)[C@@H](NC(=O)[C@@H](NC1=O)CCCN)CO)C(C)C)CCCCN)CO)[C@@H](C)CC)C(C)C)CCCCN)[C@@H](C)CC)C

Properties
Chemical formula	C_{79}H_{145}N_{17}O_{17}
Molar mass	1605.131 g·mol^{−1}
- Except where otherwise noted, data are given for materials in their standard state (at 25 °C [77 °F], 100 kPa). Infobox references

Paenibacterin is a mixture of antimicrobial lipopeptides isolated from Paenibacillus thiaminolyticus. It contains three isomeric compounds which differ by the fatty acid side chain.
