= Camelliibacillus =

Scientific classification
- Domain: Bacteria
- Kingdom: Bacillati
- Phylum: Bacillota
- Class: Bacilli
- Order: Bacillales
- Family: Bacillaceae
- Genus: Camelliibacillus; Lin et al. 2018

Type species
- Camelliibacillus cellulosilyticus Lin, Yan & Yi 2018

Species
- C. cellulosilyticus

Genus of bacteria

Camelliibacillus is a Gram-positive, non-endospore-forming, anaerobic, rod-shaped, and non-motile genus of bacteria from the family of Bacillaceae with one known species (Camelliibacillus cellulosilyticus). Camelliibacillus cellulosilyticus has been isolated from green tea.

== See also ==
- List of bacterial orders
- List of bacteria genera
