= Paenibacillus larvae =

Scientific classification
- Domain: Bacteria
- Kingdom: Bacillati
- Phylum: Bacillota
- Class: Bacilli
- Order: Caryophanales
- Family: Paenibacillaceae
- Genus: Paenibacillus
- Species: P. larvae

Binomial name
- Paenibacillus larvae (White, 1906) Ash et al., 1994 emend. Heyndrickx et al., 1996 emend. Genersch et al., 2006

Synonyms
- Bacillus larvae White, 1906; Bacillus pulvifaciens Nakamura, 1984; Paenibacillus pulvifaciens (Nakamura, 1984) Ash et al., 1994; Paenibacillus larvae pulvifaciens (Nakamura, 1984) Heyndrickx et al., 1996; Paenibacillus larvae larvae (White, 1906) Ash et al., 1994 emend. Heyndrickx et al., 1996

Species of bacterium

Paenibacillus larvae are a species of bacterium, found worldwide, which cause American foulbrood, a fatal disease of the larvae of honeybees (Apis mellifera). It is a Gram-positive, rod-shaped bacterium, which forms spores which can remain viable for at least thirty-five years.

== Morphology ==
P. larvae is a rod-shaped bacterium with slightly rounded ends, approximately 2.5–5 μm long and 0.5 μm wide. The spore of P. larvae is oval, approximately 0.6 μm wide and 1.3 μm long.

== Classification ==
In 1906, G.F. White first described the bacterium that caused American foulbrood (AFB), and named it Bacillus larvae. In 1950, a bacterium isolated from bee larvae and associated with the rare disease "powdery scale" was named Bacillus pulvifaciens by Katznelson. In 1993, both B. larvae and B. pulvifaciens were transferred to a new genus, Paenibacillus. The two species were combined into a single species: Paenibacillus larvae in 1996, remaining differentiated as two subspecies: P. larvae ssp. larvae (formerly Bacillus larvae) and P. larvae ssp. pulvifaciens (formerly Bacillus pulvifaciens). In 2006, the subspecies were eliminated based on spore morphology, biochemical profile and DNA testing, and when it was also demonstrated that experimental infection of honeybee larvae with the pulvifaciens subspecies caused American foulbrood signs without causing "powdery scale".

There are at least four genotypes of P. larvae, named after their enterobacterial repetitive intergenic consensus (ERIC) sequences. Genotype ERIC I corresponds to the former species of Bacillus larvae, and genotypes ERIC II, III and IV correspond to the former species of B. pulvifaciens. A fifth genotype ERIC V has recently been discovered in honey.

== Epidemiology ==
P. larvae is found worldwide. Genotypes ERIC I and II are most frequently isolated from global AFB outbreaks. In contrast, genotypes ERIC III and IV are found in bacteriology archives and are considered practically unimportant. ERIC V was found in honey and has not been isolated from infected colonies yet.

== American foulbrood ==
P. larvae causes American foulbrood in honeybees. The transmission is helped by small hive beetle, which the infected small hive beetle can spread the bacteria by directly contacting both honey and honeybee.
