= Oxalophagus =

Scientific classification
- Domain: Bacteria
- Kingdom: Bacillati
- Phylum: Bacillota
- Class: Bacilli
- Order: Paenibacillales
- Family: Paenibacillaceae
- Genus: Oxalophagus; Collins et al. 1994

Type species
- Oxalophagus oxalicus (Dehning & Schink 1990) Collins et al. 1994

Species
- O. oxalicus

Genus of bacteria

Oxalophagus is a genus of bacteria belonging to the Bacillota. Up to now, only one species of this genus is known, Oxalophagus oxalicus

== See also ==
- List of bacterial orders
- List of bacteria genera
