= Milky spore =

Paenibacillus popilliae

Scientific classification
- Domain: Bacteria
- Kingdom: Bacillati
- Phylum: Bacillota
- Class: Bacilli
- Order: Paenibacillales
- Family: Paenibacillaceae
- Genus: Paenibacillus
- Species: P. popilliae

Binomial name
- Paenibacillus popilliae Dutky 1941

Synonyms
- Bacillus popilliae

Species of bacterium

Paenibacillus popilliae (formerly Bacillus popilliae) is a soil-dwelling, Gram-positive, rod-shaped bacterium. It is responsible for a disease (commonly called milky spore) of the white grubs of Japanese beetles.

The adult Japanese beetles pupate in July (in the Northeast United States) and feed on flowers and leaves of shrubs and garden plants. During this adult stage, the beetles also mate and the females lay eggs in the soil in late July to early August. The eggs hatch soon afterwards and in this larval or grub stage, they feed on the roots of grass and other plants. As the weather gets cooler and winter approaches, the grubs go deeper into the soil, and feeding declines as they over-winter.

In August, when the grubs are close to the surface and feeding, they are vulnerable to infestation by milky spore. This is also the optimal time frame for turf inoculation or applications with milky spore to increase milky spore in the soil environment (there are product specific guidelines that should be followed for milky spore application).

Resident spores in the soil are swallowed by grubs during their normal pattern of feeding on roots. This ingestion of the spore by the host activates reproduction of the bacteria inside the grub. Within 7–21 days the grub will eventually die and as the grub decomposes, billions of new spores are released into the soil.

Milky spore in the soil is not harmful to beneficial insects, birds, bees, pets, or people; and milky spore, like other bacteria, is highly survivable in drought conditions but suffers in temperatures of Zone 5 and colder.

== See also ==
- Bacillus lentimorbus

== Sources ==
- Dutky, S. R. (1 July 1940). "Two New Spore-Forming Bacteria Causing Milky Diseases of Japanese Beetle Larvae". Journal of Agricultural Research. 61 (1). Washington, D.C.: U.S. Department of Agriculture: 57–68. Archived from the original on July 10, 2020.
- Milkyspore.com
