= Terrilactibacillus =

Scientific classification
- Domain: Bacteria
- Kingdom: Bacillati
- Phylum: Bacillota
- Class: Bacilli
- Order: Bacillales
- Family: Bacillaceae
- Genus: Terrilactibacillus; Prasirtsak et al. 2016

Type species
- Terrilactibacillus laevilacticus Prasirtsak et al. 2016

Species
- T. laevilacticus; T. tamarindi

Genus of bacteria

Terrilactibacillus is a genus of bacteria from the family of Bacillaceae with one known species (Terrilactibacillus laevilacticus). Terrilactibacillus laevilacticus has been isolated from soil in Thailand.

== Phylogeny ==
The currently accepted taxonomy is based on the List of Prokaryotic names with Standing in Nomenclature (LPSN) and National Center for Biotechnology Information (NCBI).

16S rRNA based LTP_10_2024

- Terrilactibacillus
  - T. laevilacticus Prasirtsak et al. 2016
  - T. tamarindi Kingkaew et al. 2020

120 marker proteins based GTDB 09-RS220

- Terrilactibacillus
  - T. laevilacticus
  - T. tamarindi

== See also ==
- List of bacterial orders
- List of bacteria genera
