= Aneurinibacillus thermoaerophilus =

Scientific classification
- Domain: Bacteria
- Kingdom: Bacillati
- Phylum: Bacillota
- Class: Bacilli
- Order: Paenibacillales
- Family: Paenibacillaceae
- Genus: Aneurinibacillus
- Species: A. thermoaerophilus

Binomial name
- Aneurinibacillus thermoaerophilus (Meier-Stauffer et al. 1996) Heyndrickx et al. 1997

Type strain
- DSM 10154

Synonyms
- Bacillus thermoaerophilus

Species of bacterium

Aneurinibacillus thermoaerophilus is a bacterium from the genus Aneurinibacillus.
