= Cohnella =

Scientific classification
- Domain: Bacteria
- Kingdom: Bacillati
- Phylum: Bacillota
- Class: Bacilli
- Order: Paenibacillales
- Family: Paenibacillaceae
- Genus: Cohnella; Kämpfer et al., 2006

Type species
- Cohnella thermotolerans Kämpfer et al. 2006

Species
- See text

Genus of bacteria

Cohnella is a genus of bacteria in the family Paenibacillaceae. Its species are Gram-positive, rod-shaped and endospore-forming.

== Phylogeny ==
The currently accepted taxonomy is based on the List of Prokaryotic names with Standing in Nomenclature (LPSN) and National Center for Biotechnology Information (NCBI).

16S rRNA based LTP_10_2024

- Cohnella
  - C. fontinalis Shiratori et al. 2010
  - - - C. algara Lee & Jeon 2017
      - C. laeviribosi Cho et al. 2007
    - - - C. zeiphila Johnson et al. 2022
        - - - C. panacarvi Yoon, Ten & Im 2011
            - C. saccharovorans Choi et al. 2016
          - - C. damuensis corrig. Luo et al. 2010
            - C. fermenti Lin et al. 2020
      - - - - C. lubricantis Kämpfer, Glaeser & Busse 2017
            - C. nanjingensis Huang et al. 2014
          - - - C. formosensis Hameed et al. 2013
              - C. thailandensis Khianngam et al. 2010
            - - C. thermotolerans Kämpfer et al. 2006
              - - C. terrae Khianngam et al. 2010
                - C. xylanilytica Khianngam et al. 2010
        - - - C. faecalis Zhu et al. 2019
            - - C. ginsengisoli Kim et al. 2010
              - - "C. hashimotonis" Simpson et al. 2023
                - C. rhizosphaerae Kämpfer et al. 2014
          - - C. yongneupensis Kim et al. 2010
            - - C. kolymensis Kudryashova et al. 2018
              - - - C. cellulosilytica Khianngam et al. 2012
                  - - - C. ferri Mayilraj et al. 2013
                      - C. phaseoli Garcia-Fraile et al. 2008
                    - - C. terricola Kim et al. 2021
                      - - C. boryungensis Yoon & Jung 2012
                        - - C. hongkongensis Kämpfer et al. 2006
                          - C. soli Kim et al. 2012
                - - - C. luojiensis Cai et al. 2010
                    - - C. endophytica Meng, Tuo & Yan 2019
                      - C. suwonensis Kim et al. 2012
                  - - C. herbarum Won et al. 2022
                    - - C. collisoli Lee et al. 2015
                      - - C. arctica Jiang et al. 2012
                        - C. lupini Flores-Felix et al. 2014

120 marker proteins based GTDB 09-RS220

- Cohnella
  - - - C. nanjingensis
      - - "C. hashimotonis"
        - - C. ginsengisoli
          - C. rhizosphaerae
    - - - C. algara
        - C. laeviribosi
      - - - C. fermenti
          - C. thailandensis
        - - C. zeiphila
          - - C. xylanilytica
            - - C. lubricantis
              - C. thermotolerans
  - - - C. faecalis
      - - "C. candida" Maeng et al. 2019
        - "C. pontilimi" Baek et al. 2021
    - - C. kolymensis
      - - - "Ca. C. colombiensis" Díaz-García et al. 2023
          - C. panacarvi
        - - - C. phaseoli
            - C. terricola
          - - C. endophytica
            - - - C. herbarum
                - - "C. cholangitidis" Kim et al. 2021
                  - C. mopanensis Tang et al. 2024
              - - "C. abietis" Jiang et al. 2019
                - - C. luojiensis
                  - C. lupini

Unassigned species:

- "C. capsici" Wang, Wang & Chen 2015
- "C. caldifontis" Xiang et al. 2024
- "C. humi" Nguyen & Lee 2014
- "C. plantaginis" Wang et al. 2012
- "C. rhizoplanae" Kämpfer et al. 2024
- "C. silvisoli" Wang et al. 2023
