= Aneurinibacillus =

Scientific classification
- Domain: Bacteria
- Kingdom: Bacillati
- Phylum: Bacillota
- Class: Bacilli
- Order: Paenibacillales
- Family: Paenibacillaceae
- Genus: Aneurinibacillus (Shida et al. 1994) Shida et al. 1996

Type species
- Aneurinibacillus aneurinilyticus corrig. (Shida et al. 1994) Shida et al. 1996

Species
- A. aneurinilyticus; A. danicus; "A. humi"; A. migulanus; A. sediminis; A. soli; A. terranovensis; A. thermoaerophilus; A. tyrosinisolvens; A. uraniidurans

Genus of bacteria

Aneurinibacillus is an aerobic and endospore-forming bacterial genus from the family of Paenibacillaceae. Genome size of Aneurinibacillus migulanus strain TP115 is 5,556,554 bp.

== Phylogeny ==
The currently accepted taxonomy is based on the List of Prokaryotic names with Standing in Nomenclature (LPSN) and National Center for Biotechnology Information (NCBI)

16S rRNA based LTP_10_2024

- Aneurinibacillus
  - A. thermoaerophilus (Meier-Stauffer et al. 1996) Heyndrickx et al. 1997
  - - A. terranovensis Allan et al. 2005
    - - - A. soli Lee et al. 2014
        - A. tyrosinisolvens Tsubouchi et al. 2015
      - - A. danicus Goto et al. 2004
        - - A. sediminis Subhash, Kim & Lee 2017
          - - A. aneurinilyticus corrig. (Shida et al. 1994) Shida et al. 1996
            - A. migulanus (Takagi et al. 1993) Shida et al. 1996

120 marker proteins based GTDB 09-RS220

- Aneurinibacillus
  - A. terranovensis
  - - A. tyrosinisolvens
    - - A. soli
      - - A. thermoaerophilus
        - - A. danicus
          - - A. aneurinilyticus
            - A. migulanus

== See also ==
- List of bacterial orders
- List of bacteria genera
