= DTDP-3-amino-3,6-dideoxy-alpha-D-galactopyranose 3-N-acetyltransferase =

Identifiers
- EC no.: 2.3.1.197

Databases
- IntEnz: IntEnz view
- BRENDA: BRENDA entry
- ExPASy: NiceZyme view
- KEGG: KEGG entry
- MetaCyc: metabolic pathway
- PRIAM: profile
- PDB structures: RCSB PDB PDBe PDBsum
Search
- PMC: articles
- PubMed: articles
- NCBI: proteins

DTDP-3-amino-3,6-dideoxy-alpha-D-galactopyranose 3-N-acetyltransferase (EC 2.3.1.197, FdtC, dTDP-D-Fucp3N acetylase) is an enzyme with systematic name acetyl-CoA:dTDP-3-amino-3,6-dideoxy-alpha-D-galactopyranose 3-N-acetyltransferase. This enzyme catalyses the following chemical reaction

acetyl-CoA + dTDP-3-amino-3,6-dideoxy-alpha-D-galactopyranose $\rightleftharpoons$ CoA + dTDP-3-acetamido-3,6-dideoxy-alpha-D-galactopyranose

dTDP-3-acetamido-3,6-dideoxy-alpha-D-galactose is a component of the glycan chain of the crystalline bacterial cell surface layer protein of Aneurinibacillus thermoaerophilus.
