= Sporolactobacillus =

Scientific classification
- Domain: Bacteria
- Kingdom: Bacillati
- Phylum: Bacillota
- Class: Bacilli
- Order: Bacillales
- Family: Sporolactobacillaceae
- Genus: Sporolactobacillus (Kitahara & Suzuki 1963) Kitahara & Lai 1967

Type species
- Sporolactobacillus inulinus (Kitahara & Suzuki 1963) Kitahara & Lai 1967

Species
- See text

Synonyms
- Lactobacillus (Sporolactobacillus) corrig. Kitahara & Suzuki 1963

Genus of bacteria

Sporolactobacillus is a genus of anaerobic, endospore-forming, gram-positive, motile, rod-shaped, lactic acid bacteria.

The genus is unique among lactic acid bacteria given its ability to form spores, and it is therefore more heat resistant than other Lactic acid bacteria. Sporolactobacillus species grow readily at temperatures between 25 and 40 °C. The optimal temperature for growth lies around 35 °C. It was first discovered in chicken feed in the early 1960s, and it is most often observed in soil. Sporolactobacillus can sometimes be found in fermented food products such as fish, olives, or pickles.

Members of this genus are catalase-negative, do not reduce nitrates to nitrites, and do not form indole. Lactic acid is produced actively without liberation of gas from glucose, fructose, mannose, sucrose, maltose, trehalose, raffinose, inulin, mannitol, sorbitol, and alpha-methylglucoside.

== Phylogeny ==
The currently accepted taxonomy is based on the List of Prokaryotic names with Standing in Nomenclature (LPSN) and National Center for Biotechnology Information (NCBI).

16S rRNA based LTP_10_2024

- Sporolactobacillus
  - - - S. mangiferae Phuengjayaem et al. 2023
      - S. spathodeae Thamacharoensuk et al. 2015
    - - S. shoreae Thamacharoensuk et al. 2015
      - - S. putidis Fujita et al. 2010
        - - S. pectinivorans Yanagida et al. 1997
          - S. vineae Chang et al. 2008
  - - S. inulinus (Kitahra & Suzuki 1963) Kitahara & Lai 1967
    - - - S. shoreicorticis Tolieng et al. 2017
        - S. terrae Yanagida et al. 1997
      - - S. kofuensis Yanagida et al. 1997
        - - S. laevolacticus (Andersch et al. 1994) Hatayama et al. 2006
          - S. nakayamae Yanagida et al. 1997

120 marker proteins based GTDB 09-RS220

- Sporolactobacillus
  - - S. putidis
    - - S. spathodeae
      - - S. vineae
        - - S. pectinivorans
          - S. shoreae
  - - - S. inulinus
      - S. terrae
    - - - S. kofuensis
        - S. laevolacticus
      - - S. nakayamae
        - S. shoreicorticis

Unassigned species:

- "S. dextrus" Suzuki & Yamasato 1994
- S. lactosus Yanagida et al. 1997
- "S. laevus" Nakayama 1970
