= Microaerobacter =

Scientific classification
- Domain: Bacteria
- Kingdom: Bacillati
- Phylum: Bacillota
- Class: Bacilli
- Order: Bacillales
- Family: Bacillaceae
- Genus: Microaerobacter; Khelifi et al. 2011

Type species
- Microaerobacter geothermalis Khelifi et al. 2011

Species
- M. geothermalis

Genus of bacteria

Microaerobacter is a thermophilic, microaerophilic and anaerobic genus of bacteria from the family of Bacillaceae with one known species (Microaerobacter geothermalis). Microaerobacter geothermali has been isolated from a hot spring from Hammam Sidi, Nabeul, Tunisia.

== See also ==
- List of bacterial orders
- List of bacteria genera
