= Financial network =

Group of financial entities

A financial network is a concept describing any collection of financial entities (such as payment card companies, firms, banks and financial transaction processing) and the links between them, ideally through direct transactions or the ability to mediate a transaction. A common example of a financial network link is security holdings (e.g. stock of publicly traded companies), where a firm's ownership of stock would represent a link between the stock and the firm. In network science terms, financial networks are composed of financial nodes, where nodes represent financial institutions or participants, and of edges, where edges represent formal or informal relationships between nodes (i.e. stock or bond ownership).

== History ==
The concept and use of financial networks has emerged in response to the observation that modern financial systems exhibit a high degree of interdependence. Globalization has magnified the level of financial interdependence across many kinds of organizations. Shares, assets, and financial relationships are held and engaged in at a greater degree over time. The trend is a topic of major interest in the financial sector, particularly due to its implications on financial crises.

The Crises have played a major role in developing the understanding of financial networks. In 1998, the crash of Long-Term Capital Management (LTCM) exposed their underlying importance. In particular, the LTCM case highlighted the hidden correlations inherent in financial networks. In the case of LTCM, financial correlations were much higher than expected between Japanese bonds and Russian bonds. LTCM took on a significant amount of risk (at one point leveraged 25:1) to trade on this relationship, while underestimating these correlations. The 1997 Asian financial crisis and the subsequent 1998 Russian financial crisis lead to a divergence of European, Japanese and U.S. bonds, causing the collapse of LTCM. The ensuing crisis in the market proved the impact that financial networks can have. Similarly, after the 2008 financial crisis, many economists have come around to the view the very networked architecture of the financial system plays a central role in shaping systemic risk. In fact, many of the ensuing policy actions have been motivated by these insights.

== Applications ==
As a result of these insights, network science concepts have been cross-applied to the finance field. As of 2008, the literature in the field was rather nascent. Broadly speaking, data on interbank relationships and transactions can be hard to come by. This can limit the number of applicable use cases. Nevertheless, there are some major areas of interest and applications for the study of financial networks. Some of these are financial contagion and system risk, the formation of interbank markets, and characterization of current financial systems. Other applications of financial networks are stock correlation networks, interbank networks, and agent-based models. Some agent based finance models which utilize a limit order book are instances of financial networks, where traders are connected to at least one exchange, and the exchange mediates transactions between traders. Another area of study is cascades in financial networks, which helps scientists and policymakers determine how to mitigate financial crises.

The network science concepts that have been applied to financial networks are numerous and varied. Stiglitz, et.al. applied the concept and math behind multilayer networks to assess the cost of increased complexity in financial networks. Battiston, et al. utilized centrality to develop the DebtRank algorithm, a means to assess the systemic risk certain institutions can pose based on their connectedness and debt levels. Others have focused extensively on developing benchmark models for the structure of financial networks; some take the economics-driven approach by forecasting nodes as rational actors in a system, while others take a more statistical physics approach, an approach justified by the necessity of reconstructing the network because the information available is often incomplete.

== See also ==
- Systemic risk
- Cascading failure
- Too big to fail
- Systemically important financial institution
