= Mycorrhizosphere =

The mycorrhizosphere includes "roots, hyphae of the directly connected mycorrhizal fungi, associated microorganisms and the soil within their direct influence". It is the region in which nutrients are released from the roots and the fungus increases the microbial population and its activities. The roots of most terrestrial plants, including most crop plants and almost all woody plants, are colonized by mycorrhiza-forming symbiotic fungi. In this relationship, the plant roots are infected by a fungus, but the rest of the fungal mycelium continues to grow through the soil, digesting and absorbing nutrients and water and sharing these with its plant host. The fungus in turn benefits by receiving photosynthetic sugars from its host.

Participating in symbioses with 80% of terrestrial plants, the arbuscular mycorrhizal fungi (AMF) involved in the mycorrhizosphere span diverse ecosystems within which they both influence and are influenced. The mycorrhizosphere is additionally impacted by both natural and anthropogenic influences, including seasonal shifts, the diversity of host plants, land development, and agricultural methods. These factors, coupled with the improved nutrient acquisition and pathogen resistance conferred by the mycorrhizosphere, elucidates this network's essential contribution to vegetation health, soil aggregation against erosion, greenhouse gas fixation, and conservation, while serving as an ecological health indicator.

== Organisms involved ==
The mycorrhizosphere involves a community of microorganisms. There are three divisions of fungi that can form mycorrhizae, the Glomeromycota, Ascomycota, and Basidiomycota. Glomeromycota can form arbuscular mycorrhizae with angiosperms (flowering plants), gymnosperms (seed-producing plants), pteridophytes, mosses, lycopods, and Psilotales. Ascomycota fungi form ericoid mycorrhizas with plants of the order Ericales, and ectomycorrhizas with trees. Basidiomycota fungi form ecto-, orchid, monotropoid, arbutoid, and some ericoid mycorrhizae. Fungal hyphae are thinner than plant roots, which allows them to penetrate areas in the soil with moisture and nutrients that are inaccessible to roots. In some cases, mycorrhizal fungi in the mycorrhizosphere may ward off fungal plant pathogens. For example, the arbuscular mycorrhizal fungus Glomus intraradices reduces germination of the pathogen Fusarium oxysporum, but stimulates germination of a non-pathogenic fungus Trichoderma harzianum.

Soil bacteria in the mycorrhizosphere influence plant growth in several ways: affecting the uptake of nutrients, providing protection against pathogens, contributing to nitrogen fixation, and contributing to mineral weathering. Archaea are also known to exist in the mycorrhizosphere. They may contribute to nitrogen fixation and produce antibiotic compounds, but the extent of their interactions with other organisms and their overall function is not well known. Soil protozoa feed on bacteria and, in some cases, hyphae. The type of mycorrhizae greatly influences the protozoal population in a mycorrhizosphere. For example, a Paxillus involutus–conifer mycorrhiza seems to reduce the density of protozoa in the resulting mycorrhizosphere, but mycorrhizae formed with Lactarius rufus and Suillus bovinus have the opposite effect. Other soil organisms that influence the mycorrhizosphere community include soil animals such as nematodes, mites, and earthworms, which forage on roots, hyphae and their associated microorganisms.

== Ecological Interactions ==
AMF is one of the most important biofertilizers and stabilizers in nature. AMF helps plants to survive through harsh environments by providing support in nutrient uptake in the ecosystems. Specifically in the Yucatán Peninsula, AMF plays an essential role in different kinds of biomes and supports the endemic species.

=== Role in Agricultural Soil Conservation ===
Components and interactions in the mycorrhizosphere.

Different agricultural methods’ cycle timings, mechanical implements, and chemical additives produce diverse effects upon soil ecology that may be beneficial or deleterious to the mycorrhizosphere upon which crops are dependent for nutrients (e.g. P, Zn, Cu, Fe, N, K, Ca, Mg) and pathogen resistance. Green agricultural practices that promote intercropping and reduce tillage, herbicides, and artificial fertilization increase AMF colonization.

Hyphal soil penetration imparts erosion and nutritional depletion resistance through adhesive glomalin secretion, which improves the formation of stable aggregates in soil that contain nutrients, oxygen, and moisture, while accounting for approximately 5% of global organic carbon and nitrogen storage. As with roots, hyphal networks improve soil adhesion against wind and water erosion that releases stable aggregates’ carbon and nitrogen contents into the atmosphere as greenhouse gases.

Conventional Methods

Conventional monocropping agriculture minimizes potential AMF symbiosis through reduced crop biodiversity, frequent tillage, and artificial fertilizer and herbicide use.

Though artificial fertilizers are commonly used to satisfy the increased agricultural nutrient demands for larger crop yields, these reduce plant reliance upon AMF networks and may thereby reduce plants’ symbiosis with mycorrhizae. Years of consecutive harvest deplete soil nutrients and necessitate subsequent fallow periods that commonly last between 15 and 20 years. Varying extents of tillage are utilized to aerate and homogenize the distribution of artificial fertilizers and moisture within soil, though they sever hyphal connections in mycorrhizal networks.

Though AMF are typically symbiotic generalists, their biodiversity increases with that of host crops. Monocropping both reduces host and consequent AMF biodiversity as well as synergistic nutrient sharing between differing plant species. Regular herbicide use and the extrication of ruderal species (of which many are considered unwanted weeds) during fallow periods limits AMF colonization and AMF-mediated soil renewal by reducing the diversity of available plant hosts.

Milpa Agriculture

Milpa agriculture is a traditional technique utilized by Mesoamerican communities that minimizes tillage and artificial fertilizer use as well as increasing host availability with endemic multicropping and the growth of ruderal species during fallow periods. These practices optimize AMF preservation throughout the harvest cycle, often increasing crop yield through improved nutrition and reduced erosion.

Ruderal species’ AMF symbiosis during milpa fallow periods expedites mycorrhizosphere incorporation of agricultural crops upon sowing. Mycorrhizal colonization permits the sharing of both soil and plant-derived nutrients, supporting weaker members in its plant-fungi-bacteria community. Notably, maize and legumes, commonly intercropped in Las Tres Hermanas milpa agriculture, share stored carbohydrates or nitrogen and phosphorus compounds, respectively. It is through these milpa practices that maize yields are thereby greater when integrated by the mycorrhizosphere with intercropped beans.

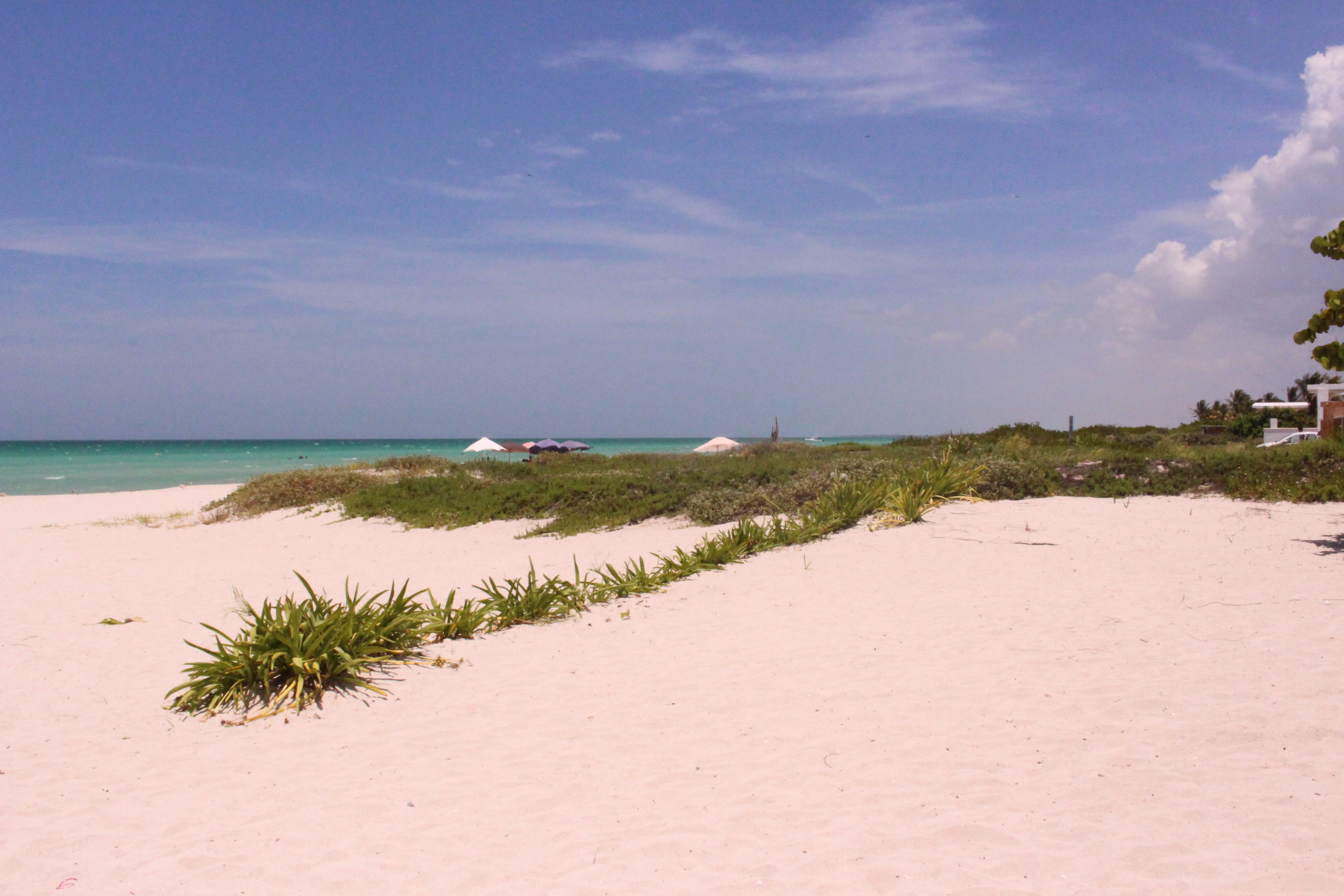
Typical appearance of coastal dunes.

=== Tropical Coastal Dune ===
Most of the AMF colonization in the tropical coastal dunes was found to be the Arum-type colonization, which is the class of symbiosis characterized by intercellular hyphae and highly branched arbuscules, resulting in a larger capacity and faster rate of nutrient flow to the plant species. This type of colonization is especially dominant in the Yucatán Peninsula, which potentially enables the AMF colonies to react more significantly to both natural and human-induced environmental changes.

Response to the seasonal and spatial changes

Studies have shown a significant difference in AMF colonization among different seasons in different environments, usually with higher colonization levels in the dry season. In the Yucatán Peninsula, the higher percentage of root colonization by Cenchrus echinatus has also been observed in the rainy seasons, along with a higher density of spores. One possible explanation is that the higher temperature environment during the rainy season enhances the rate of spore production. However, not enough research has been conducted in the Yucatán Peninsula. More data and further research are needed to show the association of AMF colonization with the seasonal changes in the Yucatán Peninsula.

Moreover, not much connection can be concluded regarding the relation between the distribution and abundance of AMF colonies and the density of shrub vegetation in different dune zones. While the density of AMF spores is widely spread among all kinds of dune zones, it is not necessarily related to the stabilization gradient or the vegetation composition.

Interaction with environmental heterogeneity

Increased utilization of AMF in the coastal dune area has led to the re-establishment and thriving of plant species near the beaches, in the state of Yucatán specifically. While a massive number of plant species in the coastal dune area have been impacted by human activities, either through touristic construction or industrial factories, AMF has managed to maximize plant resistance to the harsh conditions of the environment through enhancing their biological efficiency of intake of necessary nutrients and their physical tolerance to erosion.

The colonization of AMF in different zones of tropical coastal dunes increases as the availability of nutrients (Nitrogen and Phosphorus) in the corresponding zone drops. Dominant species such as Pseudophoenix sargentii and Coccoloba unifeva that were usually observed in the more conserved zone were less prevalent in the highly perturbed zone; more novel species such as Thrinax radiate, Bonellia macrocarpa, and Caesalpinia vesicaria were instead uncovered, indicating a higher richness and evenness of the AMF colony within the zone.

Besides the biological and ecological benefits AMF brought to the vegetation in coastal dunes, AMF also functioned as an indicator of ecosystem health. While the percentage of AMF colonization showed little relation with germination in areas in the studies in the Yucatán Peninsula, the availability of infective propagules was more observed in the slightly more perturbed area, compared to the highly conserved zones, indicating a possible association between the plant composition and the AMF biodiversity.

== Bibliography ==
Gutiérrez-Núñez, M. S., & Gavito, M. E. (2024) Timing of connection to mycorrhizal networks matters: Nutrition, N fixation, and transfer of fixed N in maize-bean intercropping. Applied Soil Ecology, 195. https://doi.org/10.1016/j.apsoil.2024.105274

Lara-Pérez, L. A., Oros-Ortega, I., Córdova-Lara, I., Estrada-Medina, H., O’Connor-Sánchez, A., Góngora-Castillo, E., & Sáenz-Carbonell, L. (2020). Seasonal shifts of arbuscular mycorrhizal fungi in Cocos nucifera roots in the Yucatán Peninsula, Mexico. Mycorrhiza, 30(2), 269–283. https://doi.org/10.1007/s00572-020-00944-0

Mathers, C. (2022). Soil Resilience and Arbuscular Mycorrhizal Fungi: How Fungi Can Inform Climate Change Mitigation and Adaptation in Maya Milpa Management. Electronic Theses and Dissertations, University of Denver, 2064. https://digitalcommons.du.edu/etd/2064

Negrete-Yankelevich, S., Maldonado-Mendoza, I. E., Lázaro-Castellanos, J. O., Sangabriel-Conde, W., & Martínez-Álvarez J. C. (2013). Arbuscular mycorrhizal root colonization and soil P availability are positively related to agrodiversity in Mexican maize polycultures. Biology and Fertility of Soils, 49, 201-212. https://doi.org/10.1007/s00374-012-0710-5

Ramos-Zapata, J., Marrufo-Zapata, D., Guadarrama-Chávez, P., Solís-Rodríguez, U., & Salinas-Peba, L. (2013). RUDERAL PLANTS: TEMPORARY HOSTS OF ARBUSCULAR MYCORRHIZAL FUNGI IN TRADITIONAL AGRICULTURAL SYSTEMS?. Tropical and Subtropical Agroecosystems, 16, 399-406. https://www.academia.edu/111421588/Ruderal_Plants_Temporary_Hosts_of_Arbuscular_Mycorrhizal_Fungi_in_Traditional_Agricultural_Systems

Ramos-Zapata, J. A., Zapata-Trujillo, R., Ortíz-Díaz, J. J., & Guadarrama, P. (2011). Arbuscular mycorrhizas in a tropical coastal dune system in the Yucatán Peninsula, Mexico. Fungal Ecology, 4(4), 256–261. https://doi.org/10.1016/j.funeco.2010.12.002

Solís-Rodríguez, U. R. J., Guadarrama, P., Hernández-Cuevas, L., Salinas-Peba, L., Ramos-Zapata, J., Solís-Rodríguez, U. R. J., Guadarrama, P., Hernández-Cuevas, L., Salinas-Peba, L., & Ramos-Zapata, J. (2021). Evaluation of environmental heterogeneity and its effect on arbuscular mycorrhizal interaction in coastal dunes. Scientia Fungorum, 51. https://doi.org/10.33885/sf.2021.51.1371
