= American foulbrood =

Bee disease

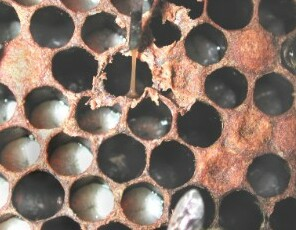
Field test for American foulbrood; the substance being pulled out of the brood cell with forceps is characteristically discoloured and stringy.

American foulbrood (AFB, Histolysis infectiosa perniciosa larvae apium, Pestis americana larvae apium), caused by the spore-forming bacterium Paenibacillus larvae, (Note: The bacterium was reclassified as one species without subspecies differentiation in 2006 from Paenibacillus larvae ssp. larvae, formerly classified as Bacillus larvae, and Paenibacillus larvae ssp. pulvifaciens.) is a highly infectious honey bee brood disease. It is the most widespread and destructive of the honey bee brood diseases. It is globally distributed and burning of infected colonies is often considered as the only effective measure to prevent spreading of the disease.

== Characteristics ==
Paenibacillus larvae is a rod-shaped bacterium visible only under a high power microscope. Larvae up to three days old become infected by ingesting spores present in their food. Young larvae less than 24 hours old are most susceptible to infection. Spores germinate in the gut of the larva and the vegetative form of the bacteria begins to grow and multiply until the midgut is massively filled with bacteria, resulting in a shortage of nutrients (commensal non-invasive phase). This is when P. larvae breaks through the midgut wall and enters the hemocoel of the larva, accompanied by the death of the larva (invasive phase). Now, the bacteria take nourishment from the dead larva and decompose it into a ropy mass (saprophytic phase). Once this decomposition results in a second shortage of nutrients, P. larvae produces millions of spores. The ropy mass dries down to a characteristic scale. This disease does not affect adult honey bees, but is highly infectious and deadly to bee broods.

== History ==
Until 1906 American foulbrood was not differentiated from European foulbrood, and the condition was simply referred to as foulbrood. Thereafter, the terms European and American were used to distinguish the diseases. However, the designations do not refer to the geographical distributions but to the areas where they were first investigated scientifically. In 1907, it was demonstrated conclusively that the bacterium Bacillus larvae was the cause of American foulbrood disease by fulfilling Koch's postulates. The geographical origin of AFB is unknown, but it is found almost worldwide.

== Diagnosis ==
Lab testing is necessary for definitive diagnosis, but a good field test is to touch a dead larva with a toothpick or twig. It will be sticky and "ropey" (drawn out). Foulbrood also has a characteristic odor, and experienced beekeepers with a good sense of smell can often detect the disease upon opening a hive. However, this odour may not be noticeable until the disease is in an advanced stage. Since response and treatment is required as early as possible to protect other colonies, absence of odour cannot be relied on as indicating absence of foulbrood. Only regular and thorough inspection of the brood can identify the disease in its early stages. The most reliable disease diagnosis is done by sending in some possibly affected brood comb honey to a laboratory specialized in identifying honey bee diseases.

== Disease spread ==
When cleaning contaminated cells, bees distribute spores throughout the colony. Disease spreads rapidly throughout the hive as the bees, trying to remove the spore-laden dead larvae, contaminate brood food. Nectar stored in contaminated cells will contain spores and soon the brood chamber becomes filled with contaminated honey. As this honey is moved up into the supers, the entire hive becomes contaminated with spores. When the colony becomes weak from AFB infection, robber bees may enter and take contaminated honey back to their hives, thereby spreading the disease to other colonies and apiaries. Beekeepers also may spread disease by moving equipment (frames or supers) from contaminated hives to healthy ones.

American foulbrood spores are extremely resistant to desiccation and can remain viable for more than 40 years in honey and beekeeping equipment. Therefore, honey from an unknown source should never be used as bee feed, and used beekeeping equipment should be assumed to be contaminated unless known to be otherwise.

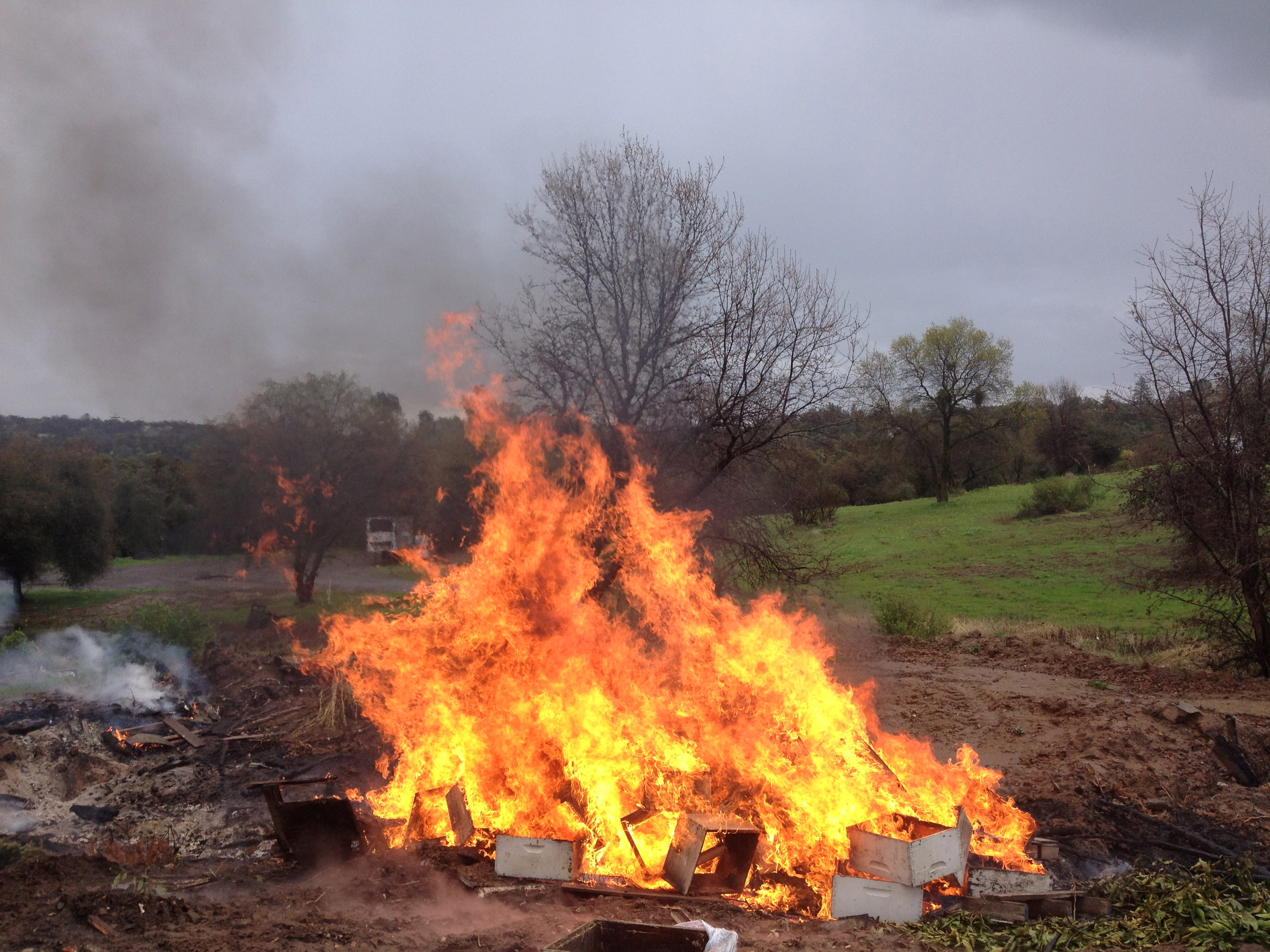
Beehives with American foul brood should be burned due to spores that remain viable for up to 40 years.

== Treatment ==
European Union law requires all infected hives and equipment to be destroyed. In the US, many State Apiary Inspectors require an AFB diseased hive to be burned completely. The spores can survive up to 40 years and are difficult to destroy.

A less radical method of containing the spread of disease is burning only the frames and comb and thoroughly flame scorching the interior of the hive body, bottom board and covers. Dipping the hive parts in hot paraffin wax or a 3% sodium hypochlorite solution (bleach) also renders the AFB spores innocuous. It is also possible to sterilize an infected hive without damaging either the structure of the hive or the stores of honey and pollen it contains by sufficiently lengthy exposure to an atmosphere of ethylene oxide gas, as in a closed chamber, as hospitals do to sterilize equipment that cannot withstand steam sterilization.

Antibiotics, in non-resistant strains of the pathogen, can prevent the vegetative state of the bacterium forming. Drug treatment to prevent the American foulbrood spores from successfully germinating and proliferating is possible using oxytetracycline hydrochloride (Terramycin). Another drug treatment, tylosin tartrate, was approved by the US Food and Drug Administration (FDA) in 2005.

Chemical treatment is sometimes used prophylactically, but this is a source of considerable controversy because certain strains of the bacterium seem to be rapidly developing resistance. In addition, hives that are contaminated with millions of American foulbrood spores have to be prophylactically treated indefinitely. Once the treatment is suspended, the American foulbrood spores germinate successfully again leading to a disease outbreak.

Alternative treatments are currently under investigation. One example is phage therapy. Another promising approach might be the use of lactic acid-producing bacteria as a treatment for AFB. However, further research is still indispensable to prove the effectiveness of these methods in the field.

In January 2023, the United States Department of Agriculture approved the world's first vaccine for bees. The vaccine protects the bees from foulbrood and is dispensed by adding an inactive version of the bacteria to royal jelly consumed by worker bees, who feed the queen bee, who in turn passes immunity to her offspring. It was developed by biotech company Dalan Animal Health.
