= Oxalotrophic =

Oxalotrophic bacteria are bacteria capable of using oxalate as their sole source of carbon and energy. Oxalate is the anion of a salt of oxalic acid; oxalotrophs often consume calcium oxalate. Oxalotrophic bacteria are often facultative methylotrophs.
