= Paenibacillus =

Scientific classification
- Domain: Bacteria
- Kingdom: Bacillati
- Phylum: Bacillota
- Class: Bacilli
- Order: Paenibacillales
- Family: Paenibacillaceae
- Genus: Paenibacillus; Ash et al., 1994

Species
- List: P. agarexedens; P. agaridevorans; P. alginolyticus; P. alkaliterrae; P. alvei; P. amylolyticus; P. anaericanus; P. antarcticus; P. apiarius; P. assamensis; P. azoreducens; P. azotofixans; P. barcinonensis; P. borealis; P. brasilensis; P. brassicae; P. campinasensis; P. chinjuensis; P. chitinolyticus; P. chondroitinus; P. cineris; P. cookii; P. curdlanolyticus; P. daejeonensis; P. dendritiformis; P. durum; P. ehimensis; P. elgii; P. favisporus; P. glucanolyticus; P. glycanilyticus; P. gordonae; P. graminis; P. granivorans; P. hodogayensis; P. illinoisensis; P. jamilae; P. kobensis; P. koleovorans; P. koreensis; P. kribbensis; P. lactis; P. larvae; P. lautus; P. lentimorbus; P. macerans; P. macquariensis; P. massiliensis; P. mendelii; P. motobuensis; P. naphthalenovorans; P. nematophilus; P. odorifer; P. pabuli; P. peoriae; P. phoenicis; P. phyllosphaerae; P. polymyxa; P. popilliae; P. pulvifaciens; P. rhizosphaerae; P. sanguinis; P. stellifer; P. terrae; P. thiaminolyticus; P. timonensis; P. tundrae; P. turicensis; P. tylopili; P. validus; P. vortex; P. vulneris; P. wynnii; P. xylanilyticus

Genus of bacteria

Paenibacillus is a genus of facultative anaerobic or aerobic, endospore-forming bacteria, originally included within the genus Bacillus, and then reclassified as a separate genus in 1993. Bacteria belonging to this genus have been detected in a variety of environments, such as soil, water, rhizosphere, vegetable matter, forage, and insect larvae, as well as clinical samples. The name reflects: Latin paene means almost, so the paenibacilli are literally "almost bacilli". The genus includes P. larvae, which causes American foulbrood in honeybees, P. polymyxa, which is capable of fixing nitrogen, so is used in agriculture and horticulture, the Paenibacillus sp. JDR-2 which is a rich source of chemical agents for biotechnology applications, and pattern-forming strains such as P. vortex and P. dendritiformis discovered in the early '90s, which develop complex colonies with intricate architectures as shown in the pictures:

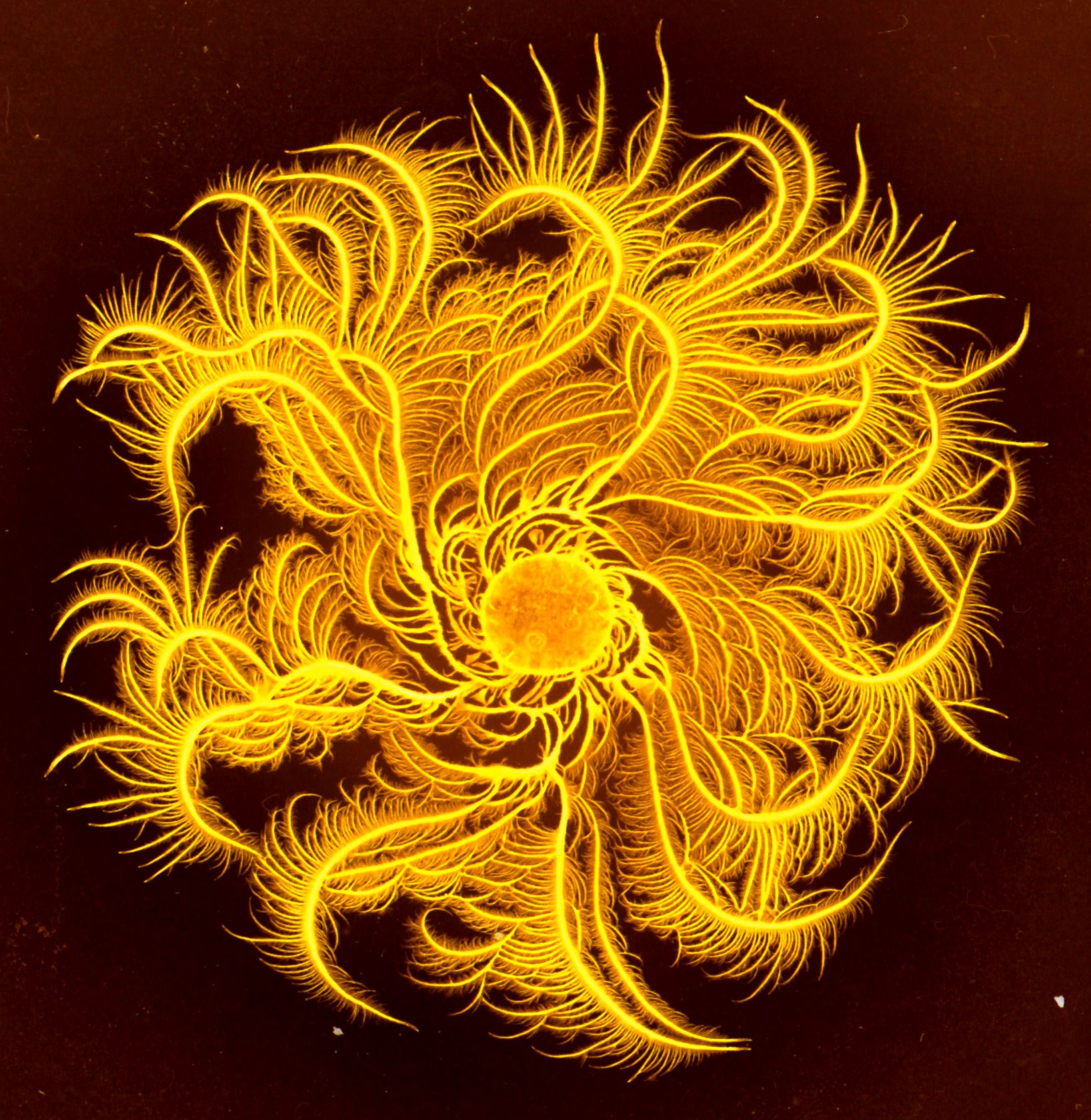
A colony generated by the chiral morphotype bacteria of P. dendritiformis: The colony diameter is 5 cm and the colors indicate the bacterial density (bright yellow for high density). The branches are curly with well-defined handedness.

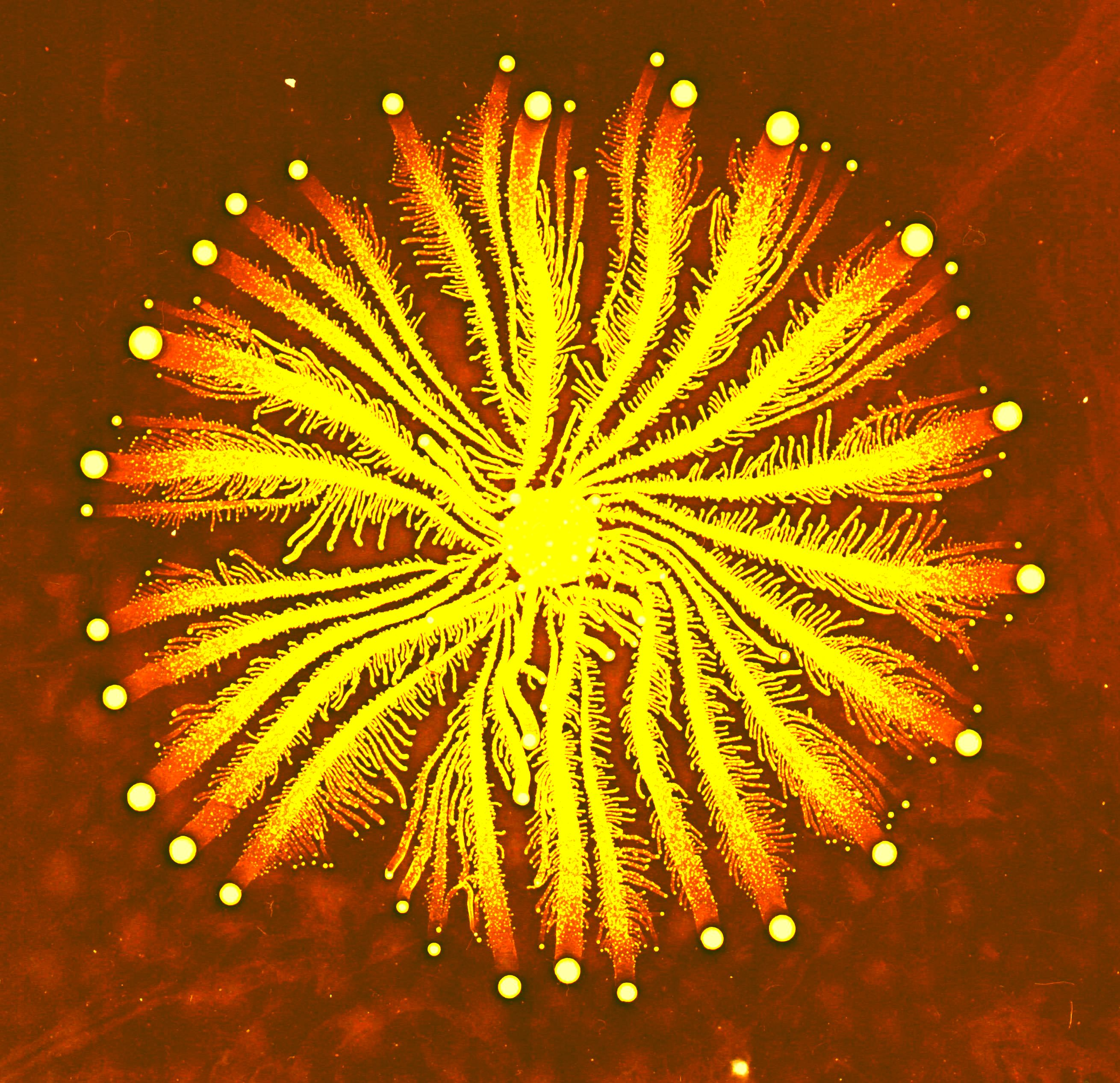
A colony generated by P. vortex sp. bacteria: The colony diameter is 5 cm and the colors indicate the bacterial density (bright yellow for high density). The bright dots are the vortices described in the text.

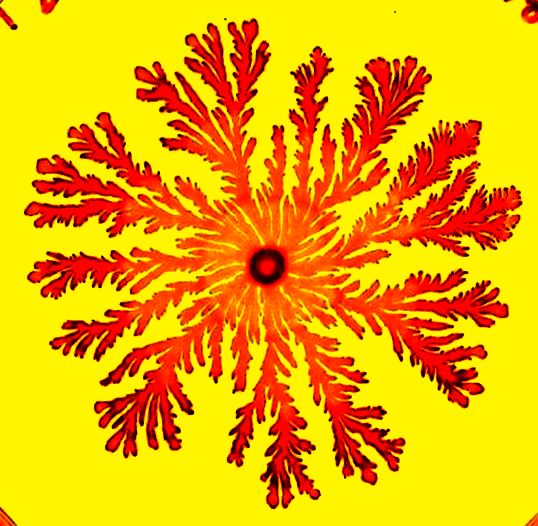
A colony generated by the branching (tip splitting) morphotype bacteria of P. dendritiformis: The colony diameter is 6 cm and the colors indicate the bacterial density (darker shade for higher density).

== Importance ==
Interest in Paenibacillus spp. has been rapidly growing since many were shown to be important for agriculture and horticulture (e.g. P. polymyxa), industrial (e.g. P. amylolyticus), and medical applications (e.g. P. peoriate). These bacteria produce various extracellular enzymes such as polysaccharide-degrading enzymes and proteases, which can catalyze a wide variety of synthetic reactions in fields ranging from cosmetics to biofuel production. Various Paenibacillus spp. also produce antimicrobial substances that affect a wide spectrum of micro-organisms such as fungi, soil bacteria, plant pathogenic bacteria, and even important anaerobic pathogens such as Clostridium botulinum.

More specifically, several Paenibacillus species serve as efficient plant growth-promoting rhizobacteria (PGPR), which competitively colonize plant roots and can simultaneously act as biofertilizers and as antagonists (biopesticides) of recognized root pathogens, such as bacteria, fungi, and nematodes. They enhance plant growth by several direct and indirect mechanisms. Direct mechanisms include phosphate solubilization, nitrogen fixation, degradation of environmental pollutants, and hormone production. Indirect mechanisms include controlling phytopathogens by competing for resources such as iron, amino acids and sugars, as well as by producing antibiotics or lytic enzymes. Competition for iron also serves as a strong selective force determining the microbial population in the rhizosphere. Several studies show that PGPR exert their plant growth-promoting activity by depriving native microflora of iron. Although iron is abundant in nature, the extremely low solubility of Fe^{3+} at pH 7 means that most organisms face the problem of obtaining enough iron from their environments. To fulfill their requirements for iron, bacteria have developed several strategies, including the reduction of ferric to ferrous ions, the secretion of high-affinity iron-chelating compounds, called siderophores, and the uptake of heterologous siderophores. P. vortex's genome, for example, harbors many genes which are employed in these strategies, and has in particular the potential to produce siderophores under iron-limiting conditions.

Despite the increasing interest in Paenibacillus spp., genomic information of these bacteria is lacking. More extensive genome sequencing could provide fundamental insights into pathways involved in the complex social behavior of bacteria, and could allow scientists to discover a source of genes with biotechnological potential.

Candidatus Paenibacillus glabratella causes white nodules and high mortality of Biomphalaria glabrata freshwater snails. This is potentially important because Biomphalaria glabrata is an intermediate host of schistosomiasis.

A major challenge in the dairy industry is reducing premature spoilage of fluid milk caused by microbes. Paenibacillus is often isolated from both raw and pasteurized fluid milk. The most predominant Paenibacillus species isolated is Paenibacillus odorifer. Species in the Paenibacillus genus can sporulate to survive the pasteurization of milk and are subsequently able to germinate in refrigerated milk, despite the low temperatures. Many bacterial genera have a cold shock response, which involves the production of cold shock proteins that help the cell facilitate global translation recovery. Little is currently known about the cold shock response in Paenibacillus compared to other species, but it has been shown that Paenibacillus species contain many genetic elements associated with the cold shock response. Paenibacillus odorifer was demonstrated to carry multiple copies of these cold shock associated genetics elements.

== Pattern formation, self-organization, and social behaviors ==
Several Paenibacillus species can form complex patterns on semisolid surfaces. Development of such complex colonies require self-organization and cooperative behavior of individual cells while employing sophisticated chemical communication called quorum sensing. Pattern formation and self-organization in microbial systems is an intriguing phenomenon and reflects social behaviors of bacteria that might provide insights into the evolutionary development of the collective action of cells in higher organisms.

=== Pattern forming in P. vortex ===
One of the most fascinating pattern forming Paenibacillus species is P. vortex, self-lubricating, flagella-driven bacteria. P. vortex organizes its colonies by generating modules, each consisting of many bacteria, which are used as building blocks for the colony as a whole. The modules are groups of bacteria that move around a common center at about 10 μm/s.

=== Pattern forming in P. dendritiformis ===
An additional intriguing pattern forming Paenibacillus species is P. dendritiformis, which generates two different morphotypes – the branching (or tip-splitting) morphotype and the chiral morphotype that is marked by curly branches with well-defined handedness (see pictures).

These two pattern-forming Paenibacillus strains exhibit many distinct physiological and genetic traits, including β-galactosidase-like activity causing colonies to turn blue on X-gal plates and multiple drug resistance (MDR) (including trimethoprim/sulfamethoxazole, penicillin, kanamycin, chloramphenicol, ampicillin, tetracycline, spectinomycin, streptomycin, and mitomycin C). Colonies that are grown on surfaces in Petri dishes exhibit several-fold higher drug resistance in comparison to growth in liquid media. This particular resistance is believed to be due to a surfactant-like liquid front that actually forms a particular pattern on the Petri plate.
