= Bacillales =

Scientific classification
- Domain: Bacteria
- Kingdom: Bacillati
- Phylum: Bacillota
- Class: Bacilli
- Order: Bacillales; Prévot 1953

Type genus
- Bacillus

Families
- See text

Synonyms
- "Plectridiales" Prevot 1938

Order of bacteria

Bacillales, from Latin "bacillus", meaning "little staff, wand", are an order of Gram-positive bacteria, placed within the Bacillota. The Bacillales are the most productive order of the phylum "Firmicutes". Representative genera include Bacillus, Listeria and Staphylococcus.

== Phylogeny ==
The currently accepted taxonomy based on the List of Prokaryotic names with Standing in Nomenclature (LPSN) and the National Center for Biotechnology Information (NCBI).

16S rRNA based LTP_10_2024

- "Bacillia" s.s.
  - - - Hydrogenibacillus
      - - Thermicanales
          Thermicanaceae
    - - Alicyclobacillales
        Alicyclobacillaceae [incl. Effusibacillaceae, Kyrpidiaceae, Sulfoacidibacillaceae, Tumebacillaceae]
      - Paenibacillales
        Paenibacillaceae
  - - - Thermoactinomycetales
        Thermoactinomycetaceae
    - - - Novibacillaceae
        - - - Caldalkalibacillales
              Caldalkalibacillaceae
          - - "Caldibacillales"
              Caldibacillaceae
            - Calditerricolales
              Calditerricolaceae
      - - - - Microaerobacter
            - - Desulfuribacillales
                Desulfuribacillaceae
              - Tepidibacillales
                Tepidibacillaceae
          - - Oxalophagaceae [incl. "Ammoniphilaceae"]
            - - Aneurinibacillales
                Aneurinibacillaeae
              - Brevibacillales
                Brevibacillaceae
        - - "Bacillus thermozeamaize"
          - - - Bacillales s.s.
                - Bacillaceae~3
                - - - Bacillaceae~4
                    - - Bacillaceae~5
                      - - Sporolactobacillaceae
                        - Bacillaceae~6
                  - - - - - Heyndrickxiaceae
                          - - Bacillaceae~7
                            - - Jeotgalibacillaceae
                              - Bacillaceae~8
                        - Bacillaceae~9
                      - Caryophanaceae
                    - Bacillaceae~11
            - - Listeriaceae
              - - - Exiguobacteriales
                    Exiguobacteriaceae
                - - - Staphylococcales
                      Staphylococcaceae [incl.
                      Abyssicoccaceae, Salinicoccaceae]
                  - - - Gemellaceae
                      - other
                    - Lactobacillales

120 marker proteins based GTDB 09-RS220

- "Bacillia" s.s.
  - - "Pasteuriales"
      Pasteuriaceae
  - - - - Kyrpidiales
          Kyrpidiaceae
      - - Tumebacillales
          - - Collibacillus {BOQE01}
            - Effusibacillaceae
          - Tumebacillaceae
        - Alicyclobacillales
          - Sulfoacidibacillaceae
          - Alicyclobacillaceae
    - - - Desulfuribacillales
          Desulfuribacillaceae
      - - - - Calditerricolales
              Calditerricolaceae
          - - - Bacillales_F
                "Bacillus thermozeamaize" {Bacillaceae_M}
            - - Thermicanales
                Thermicanaceae
              - "Brockiales"
                "Brockiaceae"
        - - - Thermoactinomycetales
              - Novibacillaceae
              - - - - "Polycladomycesaceae"
                    - "Planifilaceae"
                  - "Desmosporaceae"
                - - Mechercharimyces {JANTPT01}
                  - Thermoactinomycetaceae
          - - - Paenibacillales
                - "Reconcilibacillaceae"
                - - - "Xylanibacillaceae"
                    - - Insulibacter {DA-C8}
                      - "Longirhabdaceae"
                  - - Paenibacillus_AK & AE {YIM-B00363}
                    - - "Gorillibacteriaceae"
                      - - Paenibacillus swuensis {DY6}
                        - Paenibacillaceae
            - - - - DSM‑22679
                    Microaerobacter {DSM-22679}
                - - Aneurinibacillales
                    - "Ammoniphilaceae"
                    - Aneurinibacillaceae
                  - Brevibacillales
                    Brevibacillaceae
              - - - Tepidibacillales
                    Tepidibacillaceae
                - - - "Rubeoparvulales"
                      "Rubeoparvulaceae"
                  - - - Caldalkalibacillales
                        - Caldalkalibacillus_A {JCM-10596}
                        - Caldalkalibacillaceae
                    - - - Exiguobacteriales
                          Exiguobacteriaceae
                      - - - "Harrysmithimonadales"
                            "Harrysmithimonadaceae"
                        - - - "Bacillidae"
                              - - "Caldibacillales" Bacillales_B
                                  - - Bacillus_CG & BF {JC228}
                                    - Caldibacillaceae
                                  - - - Heyndrickxiaceae
                                      - - - Bacillus smithii {DSM-4216}
                                          - - Oikeobacillus {DSM-23947}
                                            - Domibacillaceae
                                        - - Falsibacillaceae
                                          - - - Mangrovibacillus {R1DC41}
                                              - - Bacillus coahuilensis {Bacillaceae_K}
                                                - Jeotgalibacillaceae
                                            - Rossellomoreaceae
                                    - - - Pradoshiaceae
                                        - Peribacillus {DSM-1321}
                                      - Cytobacillaceae
                              - - - Bacillales s.s.
                                    - - Bacillus_BS {SA4}
                                      - Bacillaceae_G
                                    - - Priestia {Bacillaceae_H}
                                      - - - Bacillaceae_L
                                          - Anoxybacillaceae
                                        - - Sutcliffiellaceae
                                          - - - Bacillus carboniphilus {JAIVKR01}
                                              - Aeribacillaceae
                                            - Bacillaceae
                                - - - Bacillales_C
                                      - Bacillus solimangrovi {Bacillaceae_N}
                                      - Schinkiaceae
                                  - - - - - Bacillales_E
                                            - Lottiidibacillaceae
                                            - "Massilibacteriaceae"
                                        - - Bacillales_K
                                            Sporolactobacillaceae
                                          - Bacillales_G
                                            - - "Maribacillaceae"
                                              - Pseudalkalibacillus species-group 2 {HB172195}
                                            - Fictibacillaceae
                                      - - Bacillales_H
                                          - - Marinococcaceae
                                            - Salisediminibacteriaceae
                                          - - Anaerobacillaceae
                                            - - "Desertibacillaceae"
                                              - - Alkalihalobacterium {Bacillaceae_F}
                                                - Bacillaceae_D
                                    - - - - Bacillales_I
                                            Bacillus marinisedimentorum {Bacillaceae_O}
                                          - DSM‑28697
                                            Aureibacillaceae
                                        - - Bacillales_D
                                            - Alkalibacillaceae
                                            - - Pontibacillus {BH030062}
                                              - - Halobacillaceae
                                                - Amphibacillaceae
                          - - - Caryophanales
                                Caryophanaceae
                            - - - - Staphylococcales
                                    - Gemellaceae
                                    - - - Abyssicoccaceae
                                        - Salinicoccaceae
                                      - Staphylococcaceae
                                - other
                              - - Lactobacillales
                                  - Listeriaceae
                                  - other

== See also ==
- List of bacteria genera
- List of bacterial orders
