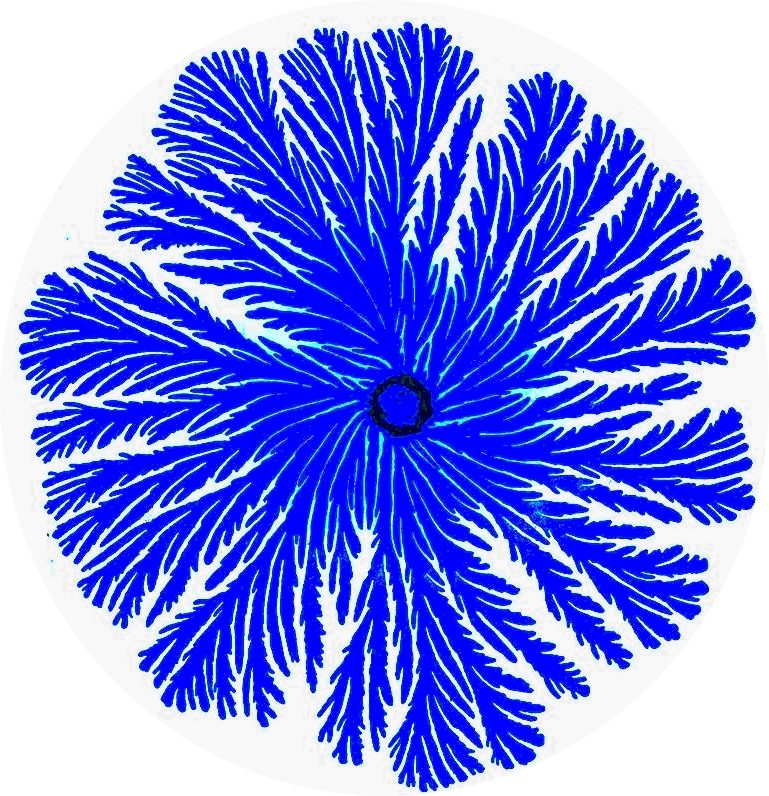
- A colony generated by the Branching (Tip splitting) morphotype bacteria of Paenibacillus dendritiformis.

Scientific classification
- Domain: Bacteria
- Kingdom: Bacillati
- Phylum: Bacillota
- Class: Bacilli
- Order: Paenibacillales
- Family: Paenibacillaceae; Garrity et al. 2001

Genera
- See text

Synonyms
- "Astasioideae" Meyer 1897; "Astasiinae" corrig. Pribram 1929

= Paenibacillaceae =

Family of bacteria

The Paenibacillaceae are a family of Gram-positive bacteria.

== Phylogeny ==
The currently accepted taxonomy is based on the List of Prokaryotic names with Standing in Nomenclature (LPSN) and National Center for Biotechnology Information (NCBI).

16S rRNA based LTP_10_2024

- - - Oxalophagaceae
      - Oxalophagus Collins et al. 1994
      - Ammoniphilus Zaitsev et al. 1998
  - - Aneurinibacillales
      - Aneurinibacillaceae
        Aneurinibacillus Shida et al. 1996
    - Brevibacillales
      - Brevibacillaceae
        Brevibacillus Shida et al. 1996

- Paenibacillales Paenibacillaceae
  - Ammoniibacillus Sakai et al. 2015
  - - Thermobacillus Touzel et al. 2000
    - - Insulibacter corrig. Chhe et al. 2023
      - - - Paenibacillus turpanensis Yang et al. 2021
          - Xylanibacillus Kukolya et al. 2018
        - - - Paenibacillus~1
            - - Saccharibacillus Rivas et al. 2008
              - Cohnella Kämpfer et al. 2006
          - - - - Paenibacillus~2
                - - Longirhabdus Chen et al. 2019
                  - Chengkuizengella Cao et al. 2017
              - - - Paenibacillus~3
                  - - Paenibacillus~4
                    - - Paenibacillus cymbidii Sun et al. 2019
                      - - Gorillibacterium Keita et al. 2017
                        - - Paenibacillus aurantius Hwang et al. 2024
                          - Paludirhabdus Hwanget al. 2018
                - Paenibacillus~5
            - - Paenibacillus larvae (White 1906) Ash, Priest & Collins 1994
              - - Paenibacillus~6
                - - - Paenibacillus sediminis Wang et al. 2012
                    - - Paenibacillus cisolokensis Yokota et al. 2016
                      - Marinicrinis Guo et al. 2016
                  - - Paenibacillus~7
                    - - Paenibacillus~8
                      - - Paenibacillus~9
                        - - - Paenibacillus~10
                            - - Paenibacillus qingshengii Chen et al. 2015
                              - Fontibacillus Saha et al. 2010
                          - Paenibacillus Ash, Priest & Collins 1994

120 marker proteins based GTDB 09-RS220

- - - Paenibacillales
      - - "Reconciliibacillaceae"
          - Paenibacillus thermoaerophilus Ueda, Yamamoto & Kurosawa 2013
          - "Ca. Reconciliibacillus" Kolinko et al. 2019
      - - - - "Xylanibacillaceae"
              Xylanibacillus
          - - DA‑C8
              Insulibacter
            - "Longirhabdaceae"
              - Longirhabdus
              - Chengkuizengella
        - - - YIM‑B00363
              Paenibacillus_AK & AE
          - - - "Gorillibacteriaceae"
                - - Paenibacillus_AA & AB
                  - - Paenibacillus_V, AN & AC
                    - - Paenibacillus_L
                      - Gorillibacterium
                - Paenibacillus_AF, S, G, AM, H, F, AL, AI & E
            - - DY6
                Paenibacillus swuensis Lee et al. 2015
              - Paenibacillaceae
                - - Cohnella
                  - - Thermobacillus
                    - - Paenibacillus_J & D
                      - - Paenibacillus cisolokensis
                        - - Paenibacillus_Z
                          - - Paenibacillus_T
                            - - Paenibacillus_O
                              - "Ca. Pristimantibacillus" Díaz Rodríguez et al. 2022
                - - Paenibacillus_K
                  - - Paenibacillus_B
                    - - - Paenibacillus_J
                        - Saccharibacillus
                      - - - Paenibacillus sediminis
                          - Fontibacillus
                        - Paenibacillus, AG & A
  - - - - DSM‑22679
          Microaerobacter {DSM-22679}
      - - Aneurinibacillales
          - "Ammoniphilaceae"
            Ammoniphilus
          - Aneurinibacillaceae
            Aneurinibacillus
        - Brevibacillales
          - Brevibacillaceae
            Brevibacillus
    - other

Unassigned genera:

- "Ferviditalea" Chen et al. 2024
- Gordoniibacillus corrig. Kudryashova et al. 2024

== See also ==
- List of bacterial orders
- List of bacteria genera
