= KInfoCenter =

System and hardware profiling application

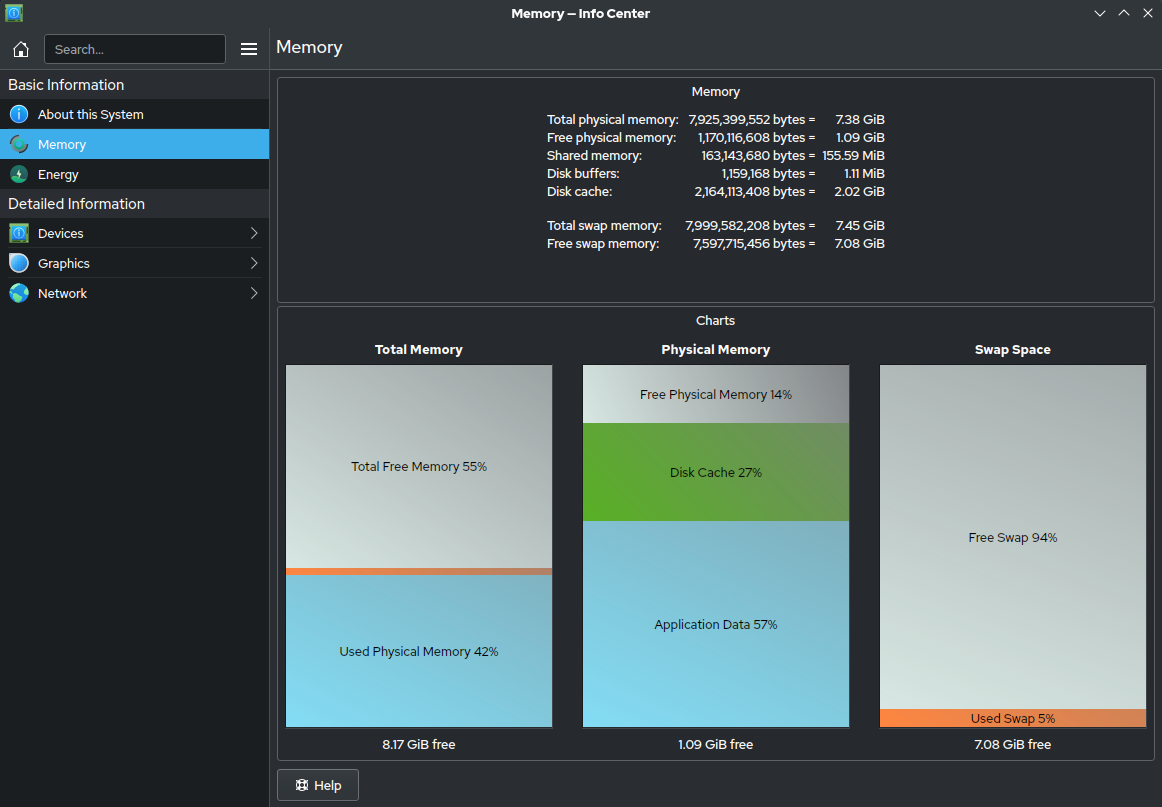
- KInfoCenter operating within the KDE Plasma workspace, exhibiting the comprehensive "About System" dashboard which summarizes OS, CPU, RAM, and graphics platform data.
- Developer: KDE
- Stable release: 6.8.1 / 20 October 2026; 6 days ago
- Written in: C++, QML, JavaScript
- Operating system: Unix-like (Linux, FreeBSD, OpenBSD, NetBSD)
- Platform: KDE Plasma, KDE Frameworks
- Type: System monitor, System profiler, Hardware diagnostic utility
- License: GPL-2.0-or-later
- Website: apps.kde.org/kinfocenter/
- Repository: invent.kde.org/plasma/kinfocenter

KInfoCenter (an abbreviation for KDE Information Center) is an open-source graphical system profiler, hardware enumeration and diagnostic monitoring utility developed by the KDE community. Designed as the primary hardware and software introspection interface for the KDE Plasma desktop environment, KInfoCenter provides both casual end-users and advanced system administrators with deeply granular, categorized telemetry regarding the host machine's underlying operating system, hardware components, low-level kernel configurations, and the graphical display stack.

Originally integrated deeply into the core system configuration utility of early KDE desktop releases, KInfoCenter was systematically decoupled to function as a standalone, highly modular application. Although engineered primarily for Linux distributions—where it natively hooks into virtual pseudo-filesystems such as procfs (`/proc`), sysfs (`/sys`), and device managers like udev—its architectural reliance on the KDE Frameworks allows it to abstract hardware data collection. This hardware abstraction layer (HAL) enables KInfoCenter to function seamlessly across various Unix-like operating systems, including FreeBSD and other BSD derivatives, without requiring platform-specific recompilation of its core logic.

Beyond merely listing hardware specifications, KInfoCenter functions as a critical bridge for user technical support. It features built-in, automated tools for generating exhaustive hardware manifests, exporting system configurations, and verifying the real-time operational statuses of graphical display servers (both the modern Wayland protocol and the legacy X11). Consequently, it is heavily utilized by developers and support technicians for diagnosing system bottlenecks, troubleshooting kernel-driver hardware incompatibilities, or identifying graphical rendering anomalies within the Linux ecosystem.

== Role within the KDE ecosystem ==
Within the broader KDE Software Compilation, KInfoCenter occupies a distinct niche separate from both System Settings (KControl) and Plasma System Monitor (formerly KSysGuard).

- Where System Settings is designed to modify the system state (e.g., changing display resolution, adjusting power profiles, adding user accounts), KInfoCenter is strictly a read-only utility. It guarantees that users cannot accidentally misconfigure or break their system while investigating hardware specifications.
- Where Plasma System Monitor provides dynamic, real-time performance metrics (e.g., fluctuating CPU usage percentages, network bandwidth speeds, active process killing), KInfoCenter focuses on static state profiling (e.g., CPU microarchitecture, total L3 cache size, maximum supported RAM, installed kernel modules).

== History and evolutionary timeline ==
=== Origins in KDE 1.x and 2.x (1998–2002) ===
During the foundational years of the K Desktop Environment, no independent utility was dedicated solely to system information gathering. Hardware profiling and system monitoring modules were tightly integrated into a monolithic application known as the KDE Control Center (KControl). This centralized hub was responsible for every aspect of desktop management. However, as the desktop environment expanded, usability experts noted a critical design flaw: users seeking basic hardware telemetry (such as confirming CPU clock speeds or checking the exact Linux kernel version) were forced to navigate a powerful configuration tool, inadvertently increasing the risk of accidental system-breaking modifications.

=== The standalone fork: KDE 3 (2003–2008) ===
To resolve the usability paradigms of the unified control center, the KDE development team executed a major architectural pivot for the release of KDE 3.1 (released in January 2003). The system information modules were permanently extracted from the KDE Control Center to instantiate a brand-new, independent software package named KInfoCenter. The original implementation was written heavily in raw C++ using the Qt3 toolkit. This era introduced the classic two-pane layout: a category tree on the left, and deeply technical, text-heavy data dumps on the right.

=== Abstraction and the Solid Framework: KDE SC 4 (2008–2014) ===
With the advent of the KDE Software Compilation 4 (KDE SC 4), KInfoCenter underwent its first complete rewrite. The transition to the Qt4 toolkit was accompanied by the integration of the newly developed Solid hardware integration framework. Prior to KDE 4, KInfoCenter modules relied on highly specific, fragmented, and often fragile hard-coded shell scripts to fetch hardware data across different Linux distributions. Solid acted as a unified API layer, abstracting the underlying OS differences. This allowed KInfoCenter to query Solid for device states via D-Bus, rendering the application significantly more stable and facilitating its port to alternative operating systems like FreeBSD and Oracle Solaris.

=== UI Modernization: Plasma 5 (2014–2023) ===
In 2014, coordinating with the release of KDE Plasma 5, KInfoCenter received a massive visual and structural modernization. It adopted the flat, typographically driven Breeze design language. The core engine was ported to Qt5, and the user interface elements began transitioning from static C++ widgets to QML (Qt Modeling Language), allowing for smoother animations and scalable user interfaces. During the Plasma 5 lifecycle, legacy modules (such as IEEE 1394/Firewire and PCMCIA) were deprecated as those technologies became obsolete. In their place, highly advanced modules were introduced to monitor modern Linux technologies, including Wayland compositing extensions, Vulkan 3D rendering parameters, and EGL contexts.

=== Convergence and Kirigami: Plasma 6 (2024–Present) ===
The transition to KDE Plasma 6 marked the adoption of Qt6 and the full integration of KDE's Kirigami UI framework. Kirigami transformed KInfoCenter into a fully convergent application—meaning its interface dynamically and fluidly scales across different form factors, seamlessly adapting from multi-monitor 4K desktop setups to the 7-inch touchscreen interfaces of handheld Linux gaming PCs like the Steam Deck (which natively utilizes a specialized Plasma desktop). The "About System" dashboard was heavily redesigned specifically to facilitate automated bug reporting, generating pre-formatted Markdown blocks for the KDE Bugzilla infrastructure.

== Architecture and technical design ==
KInfoCenter is not a monolithic executable that manually traverses hardware buses. Architecturally, it operates as a graphical host shell (a plugin runner) for a series of highly specialized, dynamically loaded libraries known as KCMs (KDE Control Modules).

=== The KCM plugin system ===
Every category visible in the KInfoCenter sidebar (e.g., "Memory", "PCI", "Interrupts") is compiled as an independent `.so` (Shared Object) file.

- Dynamic Loading: When KInfoCenter launches, it queries the KDE plugin registry to discover installed KCMs flagged with the `X-KDE-ParentApp=kinfocenter` desktop file directive.
- On-Demand Execution: To minimize the memory footprint (which typically idles under 50 MB), KInfoCenter only loads a KCM into system memory when the user explicitly clicks on its category.
- Extensibility: Third-party developers and hardware vendors can author custom KCMs to display telemetry for proprietary or niche hardware without needing to upstream code to the core KInfoCenter repository.

=== Data acquisition backends ===
The individual KCMs employ a multi-tiered, fallback-oriented approach to gather system intelligence, ensuring maximum compatibility across diverse Unix environments:

1. Virtual Filesystems (Kernel Space): On Linux, many modules read raw text directly from kernel space. For example, the CPU module parses `/proc/cpuinfo`, the Memory module parses `/proc/meminfo`, and the DMA module reads `/proc/dma`. This provides zero-overhead, highly accurate low-level data.
2. The Solid API (Hardware Layer): For complex topologies like USB trees and battery states, modules query KDE's Solid API. Solid, in turn, interfaces with `udev` via `netlink` sockets on Linux, or `devd` on FreeBSD, tracking hardware hot-plug events in real-time.
3. D-Bus IPC (Software Stack): To gather software data (e.g., active Wayland compositor version, active KDE Frameworks version), KInfoCenter communicates with other running desktop components (like `KWin` or `Plasma-workspace`) via D-Bus inter-process communication.
4. Subprocess Execution (Diagnostic Tools): For highly specialized bus and graphics information, KInfoCenter acts as a graphical wrapper. It spawns invisible sub-shells to execute standard Unix diagnostic binaries—such as `lspci` (for PCI), `lsusb` (for USB), `glxinfo` (for OpenGL), `vulkaninfo` (for Vulkan), and `xdpyinfo` (for X11)—capturing their standard output (`stdout`), parsing the raw text strings, and formatting them into readable GUI tables.

=== Security model and permissions ===
A defining characteristic of KInfoCenter's architecture is its operation entirely within user space without elevated privileges. It fundamentally does not require `root` or `sudo` access to function. Because Linux kernel developers ensure that generic hardware descriptors in `/sys` and `/proc` are globally readable, KInfoCenter can profile the entire machine securely. It explicitly does not link against Polkit (PolicyKit), inherently preventing any privilege escalation vulnerabilities within its codebase.

== Comprehensive module index ==
Depending on the host operating system, the installed driver stack, and the specific packages provided by the Linux distribution, KInfoCenter presents a vast array of telemetry modules, organized into logical subsections.

=== System overview ===
About System
The default landing dashboard. Provides a high-level, human-readable summary. Displays the OS logo, KDE Plasma version, KDE Frameworks version, Qt version, underlying Kernel string, CPU model name, installed RAM, and the active windowing system (X11 vs. Wayland). Includes a one-click "Copy to Clipboard" utility optimized for technical support forums.

=== Hardware architecture ===
Devices (Hardware Topology)
Utilizes the Solid framework to present a comprehensive, expandable hierarchical tree of all detected hardware components. It maps relationships, showing how devices interconnect (e.g., `PCI Express Root Port $\rightarrow$ USB 3.0 Host Controller $\rightarrow$ Internal USB Hub $\rightarrow$ Bluetooth Adapter`).
Memory
Goes far beyond simple capacity metrics. Provides a deeply technical breakdown of RAM and Virtual Memory (Swap) usage. It calculates actual availability by delineating memory mapped to kernel ring buffers, filesystem caches (`tmpfs`), and actively shared application memory, helping users identify true out-of-memory (OOM) risks.
Processor
Exhaustively profiles the Central Processing Unit. Details include the exact microarchitecture family, base and boost clock frequencies per individual core, the cache hierarchy (L1 Instruction/Data, L2, L3 sizes in kilobytes), and a complete string of supported CPU feature flags (e.g., `fpu`, `vme`, `de`, `pse`, `tsc`, `msr`, `pae`, `mce`, `cx8`, `apic`, `sep`, `mtrr`, `pge`, `mca`, `cmov`, `pat`, `pse36`, `clflush`, `mmx`, `fxsr`, `sse`, `sse2`, `ht`, `syscall`, `nx`, `mmxext`, `fxsr_opt`, `pdpe1gb`, `rdtscp`, `lm`, `3dnowext`, `3dnow`, `constant_tsc`, `rep_good`, `nopl`, `nonstop_tsc`, `extd_apicid`, `aperfmperf`, `pni`, `monitor`, `ssse3`, `cx16`, `popcnt`, `lahf_lm`, `cmp_legacy`, `svm`, `extapic`, `cr8_legacy`, `abm`, `sse4a`, `misalignsse`, `3dnowprefetch`, `osvw`, `ibs`, `skinit`, `wdt`, `hw_pstate`, `npt`, `lbrv`, `svm_lock`, `nrip_save`).
Interrupts (IRQs)
A low-level kernel diagnostic module that lists the exact mapping of hardware interrupt request lines to devices and CPU cores, crucial for identifying IRQ routing conflicts on enterprise hardware.
DMA-Channels & IO-Ports
Displays Direct Memory Access allocations and low-level Input/Output hexadecimal port addresses reserved by components on the system motherboard.
Sensors (Energy and Thermal)
Interfaces with the `lm-sensors` daemon and ACPI battery controllers to display real-time voltage rails, fan RPMs (revolutions per minute), battery health/degradation percentages, and thermal junction temperatures for CPUs and GPUs.

=== Data buses and interconnects ===
PCI (Peripheral Component Interconnect)
A dense list of all PCI and PCI-Express devices. Displays Vendor IDs, Device IDs, subsystem classes, and importantly, the specific kernel module currently managing the hardware (e.g., verifying if a GPU is using the open-source `nouveau` driver or the proprietary `nvidia` driver).
USB Devices
Maps the Universal Serial Bus topology. Exposes root hubs, host controllers (EHCI, xHCI), operational speeds (e.g., 480 Mbit/s for USB 2.0 vs. 20 Gbit/s for USB 3.2 Gen 2x2), and detailed milliampere (mA) power draw requests for each connected peripheral.
Storage and Partitions
Catalogs block devices, Logical Volume Management (LVM) setups, LUKS encrypted volumes, active partitions, UUIDs, filesystem types (ext4, XFS, btrfs, ZFS), capacity metrics, and precise Unix mount points.

=== Graphics and display subsystems ===
Wayland
Crucial for modern Linux diagnostics. Exposes the precise version of the Wayland compositor protocol in use, a comprehensive list of supported Wayland interface extensions (e.g., `xdg_wm_base`, `zwp_linux_dmabuf_v1`, `wp_fractional_scale_manager_v1`), and the pixel formats supported by connected monitors.
X-Server
Legacy display server telemetry. Reports screen dimensions, DPI (Dots Per Inch) configurations, color depth, the X.Org vendor release string, and active X11 extensions (such as XRandR for multi-monitor support or DRI3 for direct rendering).
OpenGL / EGL
Queries the Mesa 3D graphics library. Exposes the active 3D renderer string, supported OpenGL compatibility profiles, GLSL (OpenGL Shading Language) version, and an exhaustive list of vendor-specific graphics extensions.
Vulkan
Deeply analyzes the system's Vulkan capabilities, which is mandatory for modern Linux gaming (via Valve's Proton compatibility layer). It displays API versions, physical device memory limits, texture dimension maximums, queue families, and swapchain capabilities.

=== Networking and communication ===
Network Interfaces
Profiles physical (Ethernet, Wi-Fi) and virtual (Loopback, WireGuard/OpenVPN tunnels) network adapters. Details MAC addresses, MTU (Maximum Transmission Unit) frames, current IPv4/IPv6 routing allocations, broadcast domains, and raw byte transfer statistics.
Samba Status
Integrates tightly with the SMB/CIFS networking protocol. It acts as a lightweight server monitor, displaying active local network file shares, IP addresses of remote connected users, and real-time file locking statuses.
Protocols (KIO Slaves)
Lists all KDE Input/Output (KIO) slaves installed on the system. KIO slaves are dynamically loaded network transparency protocols that dictate how KDE applications interact with local and remote filesystems natively (e.g., `audiocd://`, `ftp://`, `sftp://`, `smb://`, `fish://`, `mtp://`).

== User interface, localization, and accessibility ==
KInfoCenter's UI is strictly compartmentalized: navigation and search occur on the left pane, while data presentation is isolated to the right pane.

- Search and Filtering: A persistent search bar allows users to instantly filter the massive volume of KCMs. For instance, querying "Graphics" will instantly hide non-relevant modules and present only Wayland, X11, OpenGL, and Vulkan.
- Export Functionality: Virtually every module includes robust export capabilities. Administrators can dump the raw hardware telemetry into plain `.txt` files, or formatted `.html` documents, allowing for easy auditing of enterprise machines or generating hardware manifests for remote troubleshooting.
- Localization (i18n): Utilizing the KDE translation framework, KInfoCenter is officially translated into over 65 languages. It handles right-to-left (RTL) languages like Arabic and Hebrew flawlessly, dynamically mirroring the entire UI layout.
- Accessibility (a11y): Through Qt's accessibility APIs, KInfoCenter is fully compatible with screen readers such as Orca. Every data table, tree view, and button is exposed to the AT-SPI2 bus, ensuring visually impaired users can independently audit their hardware configurations.

== Command-line interface (CLI) integration ==
While inherently a graphical application, KInfoCenter provides command-line arguments for power users. Executing `kinfocenter` from a terminal emulator accepts several parameters:

- `kinfocenter [module_name]`: Directly launches the application focused on a specific module, bypassing the "About System" screen (e.g., `kinfocenter kcm_usb` opens directly to the USB topology).
- `kinfocenter --list`: Outputs a plain text array of all currently installed and discoverable KCM plugins available to the application.

== Comparison to alternative profiling software ==
The Linux and Unix ecosystems possess numerous system profiling utilities. KInfoCenter distinguishes itself through its native integration with the Qt framework and KDE Plasma desktop.

Comparison of System Profiling Utilities
Software Name	Default Environment	User Interface	Underlying Framework	Primary Strengths
KInfoCenter	KDE Plasma	Graphical (GUI)	Qt / QML / Solid	Seamless KDE integration, elegant UI, excellent Wayland/Vulkan graphical stack reporting.
Hardinfo	GNOME / XFCE / LXDE	Graphical (GUI)	GTK	Includes built-in CPU benchmark testing (e.g., FPU Raytracing, Cryptohash) alongside profiling.
lshw	Cross-distribution	Command Line (CLI) / Basic GUI	C++	Extremely deep hardware probing, generates raw XML/JSON output for automated server auditing.
inxi	Cross-distribution	Command Line (CLI)	Perl	Highly condensed, colorized terminal output; heavily preferred by IRC and Reddit support channels.
Device Manager	Microsoft Windows	Graphical (GUI)	Win32 API	Allows direct manipulation (enabling/disabling) of hardware drivers and components.
System Information	macOS	Graphical (GUI)	Cocoa	Deeply integrated into Apple's proprietary hardware ecosystem; excellent for checking Thunderbolt chains.

== See also ==
- System monitor – The broad classification of software dedicated to system observation.
- KDE System Guard (KSysGuard) – KDE's legacy task manager and real-time performance monitor.
- Plasma System Monitor – The modern, heavily visual task manager and active resource monitor for KDE Plasma.
- Hardinfo – A comprehensive, GTK-based system profiler.
- lshw – A powerful, root-level command-line hardware profiler for Linux systems.
- Neofetch / Fastfetch – Command-line system information tools optimized for aesthetic terminal screenshots (ricing).
- hwinfo – A hardware probing tool originally developed by SUSE Linux.
