= Eshel Ben-Jacob =

Israeli physicist (1952–2015)

Eshel Refael Ben-Jacob Breslav
- אשל רפאל בן-יעקב
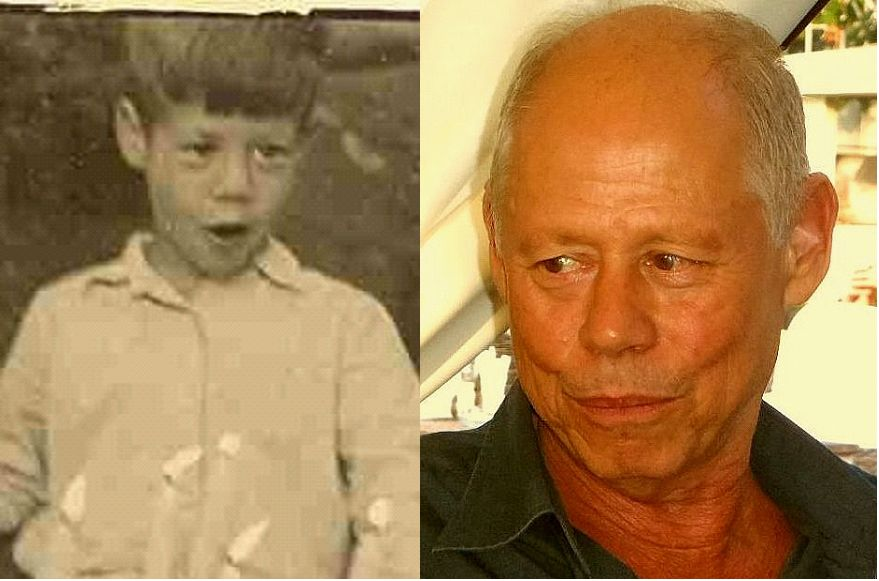
- April 1956 / July 2011
- Born: April 13, 1952; Haifa, Israel
- Died: June 5, 2015 (aged 63)
- Education: Tel Aviv University (B. Sc., M.Sc. and PhD)
- Known for: Pattern formation and self-organization, swarm intelligence, systems neuroscience: creation of the first hybrid neuro-memory-chip
- Awards: Landau Research Prize (1986), The Siegle Research Prize of the Israel Academy of Sciences and Humanities (1996) Weizmann Prize in Exact Sciences (2013),
- Scientific career
- Fields: Physics, Biological Physics, Complexity and Biocomplexity
- Workplaces: University of Michigan (1984–1989); Tel Aviv University (1986–2015)

Notes
- Vice President (1998–2001) and President (2001–2004) of the Israel Physical Society. Cavaliere dell'Ordine della Stella della solidarietà Italiana (Since 2008).

Eshel Ben-Jacob (full name Eshel Refael Ben-Jacob Breslav; Hebrew: אשל רפאל בן-יעקב; 13 April 1952 – 5 June 2015), was a theoretical and experimental physicist at Tel Aviv University, holder of the Maguy-Glass Chair in Physics of Complex Systems, and Fellow of the Center for Theoretical Biological Physics (CTBP) at Rice University. During the 1980s he became a leader in the theory of self-organization and pattern formation in open systems, later extending this work to adaptive complex systems and biocomplexity. In the late 1980s, he turned to study of bacterial self-organization, He developed new pattern forming bacteria species, becoming a pioneer in the study of bacterial intelligence and social behaviors of bacteria.

== Birth and early years ==
Eshel Ben-Jacob was born on April 13, 1952, in Haifa Israel into a family of pioneers that immigrated to Israel in the 1930s. After graduating from high school, he matriculated to study physics and mathematics at Tel Aviv University and was drafted to the Israeli Navy two years later. He completed his B.Sc., M.Sc. and most of his PhD studies during the service (1972–1980) first in the Navy Weather Forecast unit and later in the Navy Intelligence.

== Academic education and career ==
Ben-Jacob received a B.Sc. degree (1975) in physics from Tel Aviv University, a Certificate in System Analysis (1976) from the Technion (Israel Institute of Technology), and a M.Sc. degree (1978) (under the supervision of Y. Imry) and a PhD degree in physics (1982) (under the supervision of Y. Imry and D. J. Bergman) from Tel Aviv University. After three years (1981–1984) of postdoctoral research at the Kavli Institute for Theoretical Physics in Santa Barbara, he joined the Physics Department at the University of Michigan (1984–1989). Since 1986, he has been a faculty member of the School of Physics and Astronomy at Tel Aviv University (full Professor since 1992 and the holder of the Maguy-Glass Chair in Physics of Complex Systems since 2003).

Ben-Jacob was vice president (1998–2001) and president (2001–2004) of the Israel Physical Society. Since 2005, he has been a fellow of the Center for Theoretical Biological Physics, Rice University. He was elected to the American Philosophical Society in 2014 as an International Member in the Physical Sciences Class.

== Contributions in physics ==
- Life time and dynamics of non equilibrium states.
- Coulomb Effect, Coulomb staircase and single electron-based transistor.
- Quantum dynamics of relativistic solitons.
- Soliton-mediated protein folding.
- Pattern formation and self-organization.

== Contributions in biological physics ==
=== Social behavior of bacteria ===
In the early 1990s, Ben-Jacob's group discovered two pattern-forming bacteria species—the Paenibacillus dendritiformis and the Paenibacillus vortex (see also Paenibacillus). Combining microbiological experiments with physical principles of self-organization and advanced modeling, Ben-Jacob advanced the recognition that bacteria are smart cooperative organisms that employ advanced communication to lead intricate social lives in large and complex colonies. Sophisticated chemical communication allows bacteria to rapidly adapt to changes in the environment, distribute tasks, "learn from experience", make decisions and prepare for the future.^{1}^{1} Ben-Jacob put forward the idea of bacterial social intelligence and his group devised a social IQ score of bacteria as a comparative genomic tool to assess the genome potential of bacteria to conduct successful cooperative and adaptable behaviors, or social behaviors, in complex environments.^{1}

=== Multi-agent swarming ===
Inspired by Ben-Jacob's observations of how bacteria can spontaneously order their motion during collective swarming, the groups of T. Vicsek and Ben-Jacob devised a simple model able to generate non-equilibrium states that violate the usual physics theorems for equilibrium states. This work has led to the creating of a new field of multi-agent swarming (swarming intelligence), proposed to explain a wide variety of phenomena ranging from collective navigation (swarming intelligence) of bacteria, amoeba and insects, to flocking of birds and schools of fish as well as to the design of autonomous vehicles capable of functional self-organization even in the absence of an overall omniscient controller. Using fratricide to fight bacteria: In 2000, Ben-Jacob's group discovered a fascinating phenomenon of competition between two sibling bacteria colonies of the P. dendritiformis when inoculated side by side.^{1} Recent studies of the phenomenon revealed that the two colonies not only inhibited each other from growing into the territory between them but induced the death of those cells close to the border.^{1} By employing molecular biology methods combined with the new genome sequencing information and bioinformatics, they discovered a new toxin (sibling lethal factor), which acts selectively only on the same bacterial strain.^{1}

=== Bacterial decision-making ===
Building upon understanding he gained from research in neuroscience (the inhibition of inhibition principle), Ben-Jacob and his collaborators discovered that the ingenious scheme is composed of a stochastic switch regulated by a timer with adaptable clock rate (that is adjusted by the cell stress) via a special decision-circuit composed of a cascade of inhibitions. The decision-circuits of the individual bacteria are coupled by exchange of chemical messages between the cells to guarantee collective decision for the group benefit.^{1}^{1}

=== Systems neuroscience and the neuro-memory-chip ===
Ben-Jacob's studies in neuroscience are guided by an effort to simplify the complexity searching for principles of information coding, memory and learning. He has many unique contributions in the field of Systems Neuroscience and Neural Networks, including the relations between network size and its synchronized activity, the discovery of hidden neuron correlations, function-form relations and mutual synchronization in engineered networks, the effect of DNA damage on network synchronization, neuro-glia communication, new modeling of intra- and inter-cell calcium dynamics, using nano technology for network engineering,^{1} discovery and modeling of the dynamical motives (repertoire) of coupled neural networks, development of a novel system-level analysis of neural network activity (the functional holography analysis), mapping and assessments of epileptic foci, and more. Yet, the development of the first neuro-memory-chip with his doctoral student at the time, Itay Baruchi, is Ben-Jacob's most important contribution in systems neuroscience. While previous attempts were based on "teaching by reward" (enhancing excitatory synapses) or "teaching by punishment" (inhibition of excitatory synapses), Baruchi and Ben-Jacob's approach was "teaching by liberation", or "inhibition of inhibition" (inhibition of inhibitory synapses). Being recognized as a groundbreaking discovery in systems neuroscience, the achievement was awarded in 2007 the SciAm 50, The Scientific American Award for the 50 most important achievements in all fields of science and technology.

== Immunology ==
Together with Irun Cohen from the Weizmann institute of science, Ben-Jacob has established the Immune Development Initiative (IDI), a multi-disciplinary research collaboration including of immunologists, physicists and physicians.

== Econophysics ==
In the field of the analysis of economic systems, he has published a new quantitative measure, the index cohesive force of the index effect on the stock market fragility.;on epileptic seizure-like behaviors in the US stock market; and hidden order in the market chaos. He developed a new class of correlation-based networks based on the concept of partial correlations. This led to the introduction of the dependency networks methodology. When applied to the U.S. stock market, it was successful in revealing the backbone of the market, quantitatively showing the dominance of the financial sector.

== Physics education ==
While serving as president of the Israel Physical Society (IPS), Ben-Jacob devoted efforts to attract teenagers to Physics by establishing links between high school physics teachers and the ISF (Israel Science Foundation). He appointed a high school principal, Tehila Ben-Gai of HEMDA Center for Science Education, as the Secretary of the ISF, and together they promoted joint annual scientific meetings between high school physics teachers and the ISF, faculty lectures to high school students, visits of high school classes in physics departments and more. During his presidency, he started the online magazine PhysicaPlus, the only Hebrew-English bilingual science magazine. Together with Tehila Ben-Gai and Haim Harary, they initiated a two-years high school course in computational science (called MOAH, 'brain' in Hebrew) aimed to elevate high school students' creativity and teamwork capabilities. Ben-Jacob served on HEMDA Executive Council and since 2010 he served as Chair of the Advisory Council of High School Physics Education of the Israeli Ministry of Education.

== See also ==
- Ben-Jacob's bacteria

== Selected references ==
1. "Thermal Fluctuations and Lifetime of the Nonequilibrium Steady State in a Hysteretic Josephson Junction" Ben-Rev. A 26, 2805 (1982)
2. "Current Oscillations and Stability of Charge-Density-Wave Motion in NbS_e3". Bardeen, J., Ben-Jacob, E., Settl, A., Gruner, G., Physical Review Letters. 49, pp. 493 (1982).Jacob, E., Bergman, D., J., Schuss, Z., Commun, R., Phys. Rev. B. Vol. 25, pp. 519 (1982).
3. "The Lifetime of Oscillatory Steady States". Ben-Jacob, E., Bergman, D. J., Matkowsky B. J., Schuss, Z., Phys.
4. "Intermittent Chaos in Josephson Junctions". Ben-Jacob, E., Goldhirsch, I., Imry, Y., Fishman, S., Physical Review Letters 49, pp. 1599 (1982)
5. "Quantum Shot Noise in Tunnel Junctions". Ben-Jacob, E., Mottola, M., Schon, G.,Physical Review Letters. Vol. 51, pp. 2064 (1983)
6. "New Quantum Oscillations in Current Driven Small Junctions". Ben-Jacob, E., Gefen, J., Physics Letters A Vol. 108, PP. 289 (1985).
7. "Coherent versus noncoherent Bloch oscillation". Ben Jacob, E., Gefen, Y., Mullen, K., Schuss, Z., Physical Review B Vol. 1373(13) (1988)
8. "The Charge Effect Transistor". Amman, M., Mullen. K., Ben-Jacob, E., J. Appl. Phys. Vol. 65, pp. 339 (1989).
9. "STM Observations of Coulomb Blockade and Oxide Polarization in Small Metal Droplets". Wilkins, R., Ben-Jacob, E., Jaklevic, R., C., Physical Review Letters. Vol. 63, pp. 801 (1989).
10. "Thermoelectric and Thermo-Coulomb Effects in Tunnel Junctions". Amman, M., Ben-Jacob, E., Cohn, J., Phys. Letts. A 171, pp. 389–396 (1992)
11. "Sine-Gordon Solitons: Particle Obeying Relativistic Dynamics". Bergman, D. J., Ben-Jacob, E., Imry, Y., Maki, K., Phys. Rev. A Vol. 27, pp. 3345 (1983)
12. "The Quantum Dynamics of a Fluxon in a Long Circular Josephson Junction". Hermon, Z., Stern, A., Ben-Jacob, E., Phys. Rev. B49, 9757 (1994)
13. "Dephasing Length and Coherence of a Quantum Soliton in an Ideal Long Josephson Junction". Hermon, Z., Shnirman, A., Ben-Jacob, E., Physical Review Letters 74, 4915 (1995)
14. "Interference and Transmission of Quantum Fluxons through a Josephson Ring". Hermon, Z., Shnirman, A., Vaidman, L., Ben-Jacob, E., Physical Review. A52, 3541 (1995)
15. "Tunneling and Resonant Tunneling of Fluxons in a Long Josephson Junction". Shnirman, A., Ben-Jacob, E., Malomed, B., Physical Review.. B56, 14677-14685 (1997)
16. "Prediction of Charge and Dipole Solitons in DNA Molecules based on the behaviour of Phosphate Bridges as Tunnel Elements". Hermon, Z., Caspi, S., Ben-Jacob, E.,. Europhys. Letts. 43 (4) 482-487 (1998)
17. "Toy Model Studies of Soliton Mediated Protein Folding and Conformation Changes" Caspi, S., Ben-Jacob, E., Europhys. Letts. 47, 522-527 (1999).
18. "Conformation changes and folding of proteins mediated by Davidov's soliton". Caspi, S., Ben-Jacob, E., Physical Letters, Vol. 272 (1-2), pp 124–129 (2000).
19. "DNA Transistor and Quantum Bit Element: Realization of Nano-Biomolecular Logical Devices". Ben-Jacob, E., Hermon, Z. & Caspi, S., Physics Letters A 263, 199-202 (1999).
20. "Dynamics of Interfacial Pattern Formation". Ben-Jacob, E., Goldenfeld, N., Langer, J., S., Schon, G.,Physical Review Letters Vol. 51, pp. 1930 (1983)
21. "Pattern Selection in Dendritic Solidification". Ben-Jacob, E., Goldenfeld, N., Kotliar, B., G., Langer, J., S., Physical Review Letters Vol. 53, pp. 2110 (1984).
22. "String Models of Interfacial Pattern Formation". Ben-Jacob, E., Goldenfeld, N., Langer, J. S., Schon, G., Physica D (1984)
23. "Pattern Propagation in Nonlinear Dissipative Systems". Ben-Jacob, E., Brand, H., Dee, G., Kramer, L., Langer, J., S., Physica D Vol. 14, pp. 348 (1985).
24. "Experimental Demonstration of the Role of Anisotropy in Interfacial Pattern Formation". Ben-Jacob, E., Godbey, R., Goldenfeld, N., Koplik, J., Levine, H., Mueller, T., Sander, L., M., Phys. Rev. Lett. Vol. 55, pp. 1315 (1985).
25. "Morphology and Microstructure in Electrochemical Deposition of Zinc". Grier, D., Ben-Jacob, E., Clarke, R., Sander, L. M., Physical Review LettersVol. 56, pp. 1264 (1986)
26. "Formation of Dense Branching Morphology in Interfacial Growth". Ben-Jacob, E., Deutscher, G., Garik, P., Goldenfeld, N., Lareah, Y.,Physical Review LettersVol. 57, pp. 1903 (1986)
27. "Characterization of Morphology Transitions in Diffusion-controlled Systems". Ben-Jacob, E., Garik, P., Mueller, T., Phys. Rev. A Vol. 38, pp. 1370 (1988)
28. "The Formation of Shapes in Nonequilibrium Growth". Ben-Jacob, E. & Garik. P., Nature 343, 523 (1990).
29. "Adaptive Self-Organization During Growth of Bacterial Colonies". Ben-Jacob, E., Shmueli, H., Shochet, O., Tenenbaum, A., Physica A 187, 378-424 (1992)
30. Evolution of complexity during growth of bacterial colonies". Ben-Jacob, E., A., Tenenbaum, O., Avidan, O., Shochet In "Spatio-Temporal Patterns in Nonequilibrium Complex Systems", Edited by P. E. Cladis, P. Palty-Muborque., NATO Advanced Research Workshop, Proceeding volume XXI, Perseus Books, MA (1994)
31. "Holotransformation of Bacterial Colonies and Genome Cybernetics". Ben-Jacob, E., Tenenbaum, A., Sochet, O., Avidan, O., Physica A 202, 1 (1994)
32. "Generic Modeling of Cooperative Growth Patterns in Bacterial Colonies". Ben-Jacob, E., Sochet, O., Tenenbaum, A., Cohen, I., Czirok, A., Vicsek, T., Nature 368, 46-49 (1994).
33. "Complex Bacterial Patterns" Ben-Jacob, E., Cohen, I., Shochet, O., Aranson, I., Levine, H., Tsimring, L., Nature 373 566-567 (1995).
34. "Cooperative Strategies in Formation of Complex Bacterial Patterns". Ben-Jacob, E., O. Shochet, I. Cohen, A., Tenenbaum, A., Czirok, T., Vicsek, Fractals 3 1859-1862 (1995)
35. "Bacterial Wisdom, Godel's Theorem and Creative Genomic Webs". Ben-Jacob, E., Physica A 48, 57-76 (1998).
36. "Cooperative Organization of Bacterial Colonies: From Genotype to Morphotype" Ben-Jacob, E., Cohen, I., Gutnick, D., L.,. Annu. Rev. Microbiol., 52 779-806 (1998).
37. "Studies of Sector Formation in Expanding Bacterial Colonies". Golding, I., Cohen, I., Kozlovsky, Y., Ben-Jacob, E., Europhys. Letts. 48, 587-593 (1999)
38. "Cooperative self-organizations of microorganisms". Ben-Jacob, E., Cohen, I., Levine, H., Advances in Physics Vol. 49(4), pp 395–554 (2000).
39. ^{1}"Bacterial cooperative organization under antibiotic stress". Ben-Jacob, E., Cohen, I., Golding, I., Gutnick, D., Tcherpakov, M., Helbing, D., Ron, I., Physica A Vol. 282, pp 247–282 (2000).
40. ^{1}"Bacterial Self-Organization: Co-Enhancement of Complexification and Adaptability in a Dynamic Environment". Ben-Jacob, E., Philosophical Transactions of the Royal Society Lond. A Vol. 361, pp 1283–1312 (2003). Theme volume of 2002 Nobel Symposium on "Self-organization: the quest for the origin and Ben-Jacob, E evolution of structures".
41. ^{1}"Bacterial Linguistic Communication and Social Intelligence".., Becker, I., Shapira, Y., Levine, H. Trends in Microbiology Vol. 12(8), pp 366–372 (2004).
42. ^{1}"Genome sequence of the pattern forming Paenibacillus vortex bacterium reveals potential for thriving in complex environments". Sirota-Madi, A., Olender, T., Helman, Y., Ingham, C., Brainis, I., Roth, D., Hagi, E., Brodsky, L., Leshkowitz, D., Galatenko, V., Nikolaev, V., Mugasimangalam, R.C., Bransburg-Zabary, S., Gutnick, D.L., Lancet, D., Ben-Jacob, E., BMC Genomics Vol. 11:710 pp 1–16 (2010)
43. ^{1}"Deciding fate in adverse times: Sporulation and competence in Bacillus subtilis". Schultz, D., Wolynes, P.G., Ben-Jacob, E., José Onuchic, PNAS, Vol. 106(50) pp 21027–21034 (2009)
44. ^{1}Deadly competition between sibling bacterial colonies". Be'er, A., Zhang, H., Florin, E.L., Payne, S.M, Ben-Jacob, E., Swinney, H., PNAS Vol. 106(20), pp 428–433 (2009)
45. ^{1}"Lethal protein produced in response to competition between sibling bacterial colonies". Be'er, A., Ariel, G., Kalishman, O., Helman, Y., Sirota-Madi, A., Zhang, H.P., Florin, E.L., Payne, S.M., Ben-Jacob, E., Swinney, H.L., PNAS, Vol. 107(14) pp 6258–6263 (2010)
46. ^{1}"Bacteria determine fate by playing dice with controlled odds". Ben-Jacob, E., Schultz, D., Vol. 107(30) pp 13197–8 (2010)
47. ^{1}"Learning from Bacteria about Natural Information Processing". Ben-Jacob, E., Annal of the Nrew York Academy of Sciences Vol.1178, pp 78–90 (2009)
48. "Novel type of phase transition in a system of self-aligned driven particles" Vicsek, T., Czirok, A., Ben-Jacob, E., Cohen, I., Shochet, O., Phys. Rev. Lett. 75 1226-1229 (1995).
49. "Swarming and complex pattern formation in Paenibacillus vortex studied by imagine and tracking cells". Ingham, J., Colin, Ben-Jacob, E., BMC Microbiology Vol. 8(36) pp 1–16 (2008)
50. Self-Assisted Amoeboid Navigation in Complex Environments", Inbal Hecht, Herbert Levine, Wouter-Jan Rappel, Eshel Ben-Jacob, PLoS ONE, Vol. 6(8) e21955 (2011)
51. "Gene Network Holography of the Soil Bacterium Bacillus subtilis", Dalit Roth, Asaf Madi, Dror Y. Kenett, Eshel Ben-Jacob, in: Witzany, G (ed). Biocommunication in Soil Microorganisms. Dordrecht, Springer,(2011)
52. "Long term behavior of lithographically prepared in vitro neuronal networks". Segev, R., Benveniste, M., Hulata, E., Cohen, N., Palevski, A., Kapon, E., Shapira, Y., Ben-Jacob, E., Physical Review Letters Vol. 88(11), pp 118102(1)-118102(4) (2002).
53. A Method for spike sooting and detection based on wavelet packets and shannons mutual information". Hulata, E., Segev, R., Ben-Jacob, E., Journal of Neuroscience methods Vol. 117(1), pp 1–12 (2002)
54. "Formation of Electrically Active Clusterized Neural Networks". Segev, R., Benveniste, M., Shapira, Y., Ben-Jacob. E., Physical Review Letters Vol. 90(16), pp 168101(1)-168101(4) (2003).
55. "Generative Modeling of Regulated Activity in Cultured Neuronal Networks". Volman, V., Baruchi, I., Persi, E., Ben-Jacob, E., Physica A Vol. 335, pp 249–278 (2004).
56. "Hidden Neuronal Correlations in Cultured Networks". Segev, R., Baruchi, I., Hulata, E. & Ben-Jacob, E., Physical Review Letters Vol. 92(11), pp 118102(1)-118102(4) (2004).
57. "Self-Regulated Complexity in Cultured Neuronal Networks". Hulata, E., Baruchi, I., Segev, R., Shapira, Y., Ben-Jacob, E., Physical Review Letters Vol. 92(19), pp 198105(1)-198105(4), (2004).
58. "Manifestation of function-follow-form in cultured neuronal networks". Volman, V., Baruchi, I., Ben-Jacob, E., Physical Biology Vol. 2, pp 98–110 (2005).
59. "Collective plasticity and individual stability in cultured neural networks". Raichman, N., Volman, V., Ben-Jacob, E., Neurocomputing Vol. 69, pp 1150–1154 (2006).
60. "Functional Holography Analysis: Simplifying the complexity of dynamical networks". Baruchi, I., Grossman, D., Volman, V., Hunter, J., Towle, V. L., Ben-Jacob, E., in Chaos Focus Issue on "Stability and Pattern Formation in Networks of Dynamical Systems" edited by L. Pecora and Boccaletti, S.., Vol.16, pp 015112 (2006)
61. "The Astrocyte as a Gatekeeper of Synaptic Information Transfer". Volman, V., Ben-Jacob, E., Levine, H., Neural Computation Vol. 19, pp 303–326 (2007).
62. "Towards Neuro-Memory-Chip: Imprinting multiple memories in cultured neural networks". Baruchi, I., Ben-Jacob, E., Physical Review E Rapid Communication Vol. 75, pp 050901(1)- 050901(4) (2007).
63. "Mapping and assessment of epileptogenic foci using frequency-entropy templates". Ben-Jacob, E., Doron, I., Gazit, T., Rephaeli, E., Sagher, O., Towle, V.L., Physical Review E Vol. 76, pp 051903(1) – 051903(8) (2007).
64. Coexistence of amplitude and frequency modulations in intracellular calcium dynamics". De Pitta`, M., Volman, V., Levine, H., Pioggia, G., De Rossi, D., Ben-Jacob, E., Physical Review E Rapid Communication Vol. 77, pp 030903(1) - 030903(4) (2008).
65. The emergence and properties of mutual synchronization in in vitro coupled cortical networks". Baruchi, I., Volman, V., Raichman, N., Shein, M., Ben-Jacob, E., European Journal of Neuroscience (EJN) Vol. 28, pp 1825–1835, (2008).
66. "Identifying repeating motifs in the activation of synchronized bursts in cultured neuronal networks". Raichman, N., Ben-Jacob, E., Journal of Neuroscience Methods Vol. 170, pp 96–110 (2008).
67. "Glutamate regulation of calcium and IP3 oscillating and pulsating dynamics in astrocytes". De Pittà, M., Goldberg M., Volman V., Berry H., Ben-Jacob E., J. Biol. Phys., Vol. 35(4) pp 383–411 (2009)
68. "The Formation of Synchronization Cliques During Development of Modular Neural Networks". Fuchs, E., Ayali, A., Boccaletti, S., ., Ben-Jacob, E., Physical Biology 6(3) 036018 (12 pp) (2009)
69. Wrestling model of the repertoire of activity propagation modes in quadruple neural networks". Shteingart, H., Raichman, N., Baruchi I., Ben-Jacob, E., Frontiers in Computational Neuroscience Vol. 4 (25) (2010)
70. "Nonlinear Gap Junctions Enable Long-Distance Propagation of Pulsating Calcium Waves in Astrocyte Networks". Goldberg, M., De Pittà, M., Volman, V., Berry, H., Ben-Jacob, E., PLoS Comp. Biol. Vol. 6(8): e1000909 (2010)
71. ^{1}Innate Synchronous Oscillations in Freely-Organized Small Neuronal Circuits, Shein Andelson, M., Ben-Jacob, E. Hanein, Y. PLoS ONE Vol 5(12) e14443- (9 pages) (2010)
72. "Reduced synchronization persistence in neural networks derived from Atm-deficient mice", Levine-Small, N., Yekutieli, Z., Aljadeff, J., Boccaletti, S., Ben-Jacob, E., Frontiers in Neuroscience Vol. 5 article 46 pp 1–16 (2011)
73. "Organization of the autoantibody repertoire in healthy newborns and adults revealed by system level informatics of antigen microarray data". Madi, A., Hecht, I., Bransburg- Zabary, S., Merbl, Y., Pick, A., Zucker-Toledano, M., Francisco, J. Quintana, Tauber, A. I., Cohen, I. R., Ben-Jacob, E., PNAS, Vol. 106(34) pp 14484–14489 (2009)
74. "Bursts of sectors in expanding bacterial colonies as a possible model for tumor growth and metastases". Ron, I. G., Golding, I., Mercer, B. L., Ben-Jacob, E., Physica A Vol. 320, pp 485–96 (2003).
75. "Index cohesive force analysis reveals that the US market became prone to systemic collapses since 2002". Kenett, D. Y., Shapira, Y., Madi, A., Bransburg-Zabary, S., Gur-Gershgoren, G., Ben-Jacob, E., PLoS ONE Vol. 6(4): e19378 (2011)
76. "Hidden temporal order unveiled in stock market volatility variance", Shapira, Y., Kenett, D.Y., Raviv, O., Ben-Jacob, E. AIP Advances Vol. 1(2), 022127 doi:10.1063/1.3598412 (14 pages) (2011)
77. "Dominating clasp of the financial sector revealed by partial correlation analysis of the stock market", Dror Y. Kenett, Michele Tumminello, Asaf Madi, Gitit Gur-Gershgoren, Rosario N. Mantegna, and Eshel Ben-Jacob. PLoS ONE 5(12), e15032, doi:10.1371/journal.pone.0015032 (2010).

== Books ==
- Ben-Jacob, Eshel Thermodynamics, (in Hebrew, 322 pages), Tel Aviv University Press (1980)

== Patents ==
- "System For and Method of Positioning Cells and Determining Cellular Activity Thereof Patent number: 7684844; Issue date: Mar 23, 2010
- "DNA-based electronics" Patent number: 7176482; Issue date: February 13, 2007
- "Control of body electrical activity by magnetic fields" Patent number: 7160240; Issue date: January 9, 2007
