= Ecological Complexity =

- Discipline: Biocomplexity, ecology
- Language: English
- Edited by: Sergei Petrovskii

Publication details
- History: 2004–present
- Publisher: Elsevier
- Frequency: Quarterly
- Impact factor: 1.931 (2014)

Standard abbreviations
- ISO 4: Ecol. Complex.

Indexing
- ISSN: 1476-945X

Links
- Journal homepage; Online access

Ecological Complexity is a quarterly peer-reviewed scientific journal covering the field of biocomplexity in the environment and theoretical ecology with special attention to papers that integrate natural and social processes at various spatio-temporal scales. The founding editor was Bai-Lian (Larry) Li (University of California at Riverside) and the current editor-in-chief is Sergei Petrovskii (University of Leicester).
