= System Information =

System Information may refer to:

- System Information (Mac)
- System Information (Windows)

== See also ==
- System profiler
