= Compunetix =

American telecommunications company

Compunetix, Inc.

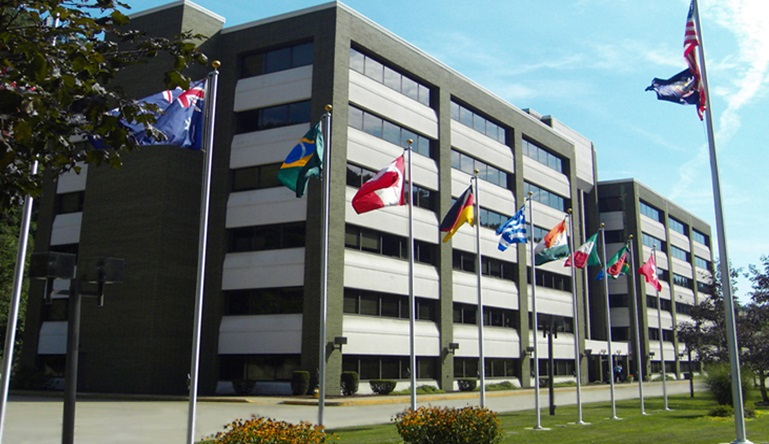
- Type: Private
- Industry: Telecommunications
- Founded: 1968
- Headquarters: Monroeville, Pennsylvania, United States
- Key people: Dr. Giorgio Coraluppi, President and Director
- Number of employees: 400+
- Divisions: Federal, Video, Communication, Instrumentation
- Subsidiaries: Compunetics
- Website: compunetix.com

Compunetix, Inc. is a privately held corporation headquartered in Monroeville, Pennsylvania, United States, that develops multimedia multi-point telecommunications systems for audio conferencing, videoconferencing, and mission-critical applications in commercial and government markets around the world. Founded in 1968, Compunetix now has over one million ports in more than 30 countries, making it the industry's largest worldwide deployer of teleconferencing systems.

== History ==
=== Early history ===
Compunetics, Inc. was founded in 1968 by Dr. Giorgio Coraluppi. Initially operating as a contract engineering firm, the company entered the printed circuit board market in 1969. For the next few decades, Compunetics worked to create custom technologies for several agencies of the United States Government.

In the 1980s, Compunetics received its first U.S. patent for a "Rearrangeable full Availability Multistage Switching Network with Redundant Conductors". Utilizing this technology, Compunetics was able to secure a contract for NASA that entailed creating a voice control system (VSS and VSD units) that could connect up to 4,000 mission specialists around the world. Shortly thereafter, Compunetics developed the CONTEX 240 and 480 conference bridges, which were regarded as groundbreaking conferencing platforms.

=== Formation ===
In 1990 Compunetix, Inc. was formally created to undertake commercial and government applications of voice, video, and data conferencing technology.

== Corporate structure ==
Compunetix is composed of five business units that collectively conceptualize, engineer and manufacture the company's products.

=== Divisions ===
==== Communications Systems Divisions (CSD) ====
- Voice and Data Collaboration Systems
- Sonexis
  - Enterprise level audio and web conferencing

==== Video Systems Division (VSD) ====
- Video conferencing systems

==== Federal Systems Division (FSD) ====
- Mission-critical systems (aerospace, military and government clients)

==== Instrumentation Systems Division (ISD) ====
- Electronics manufacturing

=== Wholly owned corporate subsidiaries ===
==== Compunetics ====
- Printed circuit board manufacturing

== Products ==
Compunetix designs and builds hardware and software for audio, data, and video collaboration and conference systems; the company also makes command, communication, and control keysets and instruments. Each product is built in accordance with military specifications at Compunetix in-house facilities.

Some of Compunetix's available products include:

=== Voice/data collaboration ===
Platforms

- Summit Olympus
- Summit Xtend X2
- CONTEX Digital Record and Playback (CDRP)

Control layer

- Windows Operator Console (WOC)
- Maintenance Client (MC)
- Passcode Server
- APIs
- CONTEX Automatic Conference Linking (ACL)
- CONTEX Report

Applications

- CONTEX Presenter
- CONTEX Operator Express

=== Video conferencing ===
Platforms

- EVERGREEN

Software

- Operator Console
- Maintenance Client

=== Mission critical systems ===
Platforms

- CONTEX 60T
- CONTEX 500T
- CONTEX 2000T
- Mission Voice Platform (MVP)
