= Microsoft Diagnostics =

Computer software tool

- Screenshot of the MSD utility, displaying operating system version information
- Other names: MSD, MSD.EXE
- Developer: Microsoft
- Operating system: MS-DOS, OS/2, Windows
- License: Proprietary commercial software

Microsoft Diagnostics (MSD) was a software tool developed by Microsoft to assist in the diagnostics of 1990s-era computers. Users primarily deployed this tool to provide detailed technical information about the user's software and hardware and to print the gathered information, usually for use by support technicians in troubleshooting and resolving problems. The assumptions made by the program were valid until the late 1990s: it does not handle plug-and-play USB or other new technologies that appeared around 2000.

In PC DOS 6.1 and above, QCONFIG.EXE provides similar functionality. Commercial alternatives include Manifest MFT.EXE from Quarterdeck's QEMM.

== History ==
MSD.EXE first shipped with Microsoft Word for Windows, and was later included in Windows 3, MS-DOS 6, and on the Windows 9x CD-ROMs. Because OS/2 and Windows NT contain code forked from DOS at the DOS 5 level, the versions of MSD.EXE included here correspond to that of that era (i.e. version 2.0).

Windows NT 3 and NT 4 have WINMSD, a program with similar features. However, the DOS/Windows specific functions were replaced by similar Windows NT concerns. WINMSDP.EXE, included in the resource kits, provides the print functionality of MSD.EXE for WINMSD. Since NT 5 (Windows 2000), WINMSD.EXE has been a loader for MSINFO32.EXE.

== Usage ==
Users generally started the program from the DOS Command Prompt using the command MSD.EXE. Starting the program under a DOS window in either Windows or OS/2 shows only the DOS details allocated for that DOS session, not for the machine in general.

== Scope ==
Aspects of the system for which MSD.EXE provided technical information:

1. computer brand and processor information
2. memory (total, EMS, and XMS)
3. video (type such as VGA and manufacturer)
4. network
5. operating-system versions
6. type of mouse (if installed)
7. disk drives (and partitions), excluding CD-ROM drives etc.
8. LPT ports
9. COM ports
10. IRQ status
11. Terminate-and-stay-resident programs
12. device drivers
13. other adapters

== Successor software ==
Microsoft replaced MSD.EXE with MSINFO32.EXE. This has similar features, but targets more recent machines. It first appeared in MS-Word, and later was distributed with Plus! for Windows 95 and Windows 98. MSINFO32.EXE under Windows XP stores system history from WMI in the XML files in Windows\PCHealth\HelpCtr\Datacoll. In the interest of backward compatibility, WINMSD became a loader for MSINFO32.

== See also ==
- List of DOS commands
- MS-DOS
- PC DOS
- System Information (Windows)
- System profiler
