= Cherrypal =

American computer company

Cherrypal was a California-based marketer of Chinese-manufactured consumer-oriented computers. It marketed a range of models with a diversity of CPU-types, structures, features, and operating systems. In 2018, Cherrypal let their domain name registration lapse, indicating that the company is no longer in business.

== History ==
Cherrypal was founded by Max Seybold based in Palo Alto. The C114 (and following C120) desktop computers were originally developed by Tsinghua Tongfang (THTF) in its Shenzhen R&D center by an engineering team led by American electronics industry veterans Jack Campbell and Ryan Quinn. An extended line of handheld, desktop, and TV-based PCs using the Freescale MPC5121e PowerPC microprocessor was shown at CES 2008 by THTF, with the desktop product picked up thereafter as an OEM purchase by CherryPal.

== Cherrypal America/Cherrypad ==
The "Cherrypal America", also known as Cherrypad, is an Android tablet based upon Telechips TCC89xx ARM11 processors. Cherrypal initially sold the tablet with the promise of an upgrade to Android 2.2 by November and support for Android market. The market support has been officially removed because the tablet does not conform to the market requirements by Google. Also the Android 2.2 upgrade has been canceled; Cherrypal promised an update to Android 2.3. The hardware of the Cherrypal America as listed by Cherrypal comprises an 800 MHz ARM11 CPU by Telechips, 256 MB DDR2 RAM, 2 GB flash memory and an 800x480 resistive touchscreen. However, there is a user report arguing some less powerful specifications according to the boot-log dumped via dmesg.

According to various Android news magazines, Cherrypal has announced a successor for their current Cherrypad.

== C114 ==
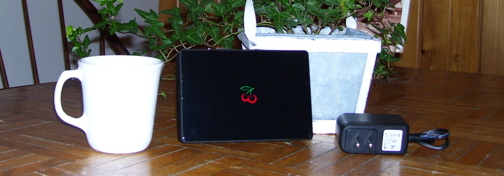
Cherrypal C114 with 110 V power adapter.

The Cherrypal C114 is a small, light nettop computer using a PowerPC-processor, the Freescale 5121e system-on-a-chip (SoC) integrated main-board, and Xubuntu as its operating system. The device launches Firefox Minefield web-browser, AbiWord word-processor, and other apps via icon double-click. An article in The Register noted that Cherrypal's producers asserted that the computer will consume only 2 watts of power. Independent, informal testing has shown a wattage consumption of still low 6.9 watts while booting.

The CherryPal C114 was a rebadged version of the LimePC D1 mini-desktop computer developed as part of a broader Freescale PowerPC chip-based product line by THTF's Shenzhen R&D center and shown to the public at the 2008 CES in Las Vegas in January 2008.

== Africa ==
Cherrypal's $99 netbook, the Africa, was aimed primarily at the developing world but also available for sale to consumers. According to a blog post by Max Seybold, the device's specs in Cherrypal's web store were kept intentionally vague, because the Africa was not built to a set design. Instead, Cherrypal either purchased pre-made netbook systems or bought odd lots of whatever inexpensive components were available and built netbooks out of these. It then rebranded these netbooks as Africas. The $99 computer was named Africa in honor of PAAJAF, a humanitarian services group based in Ghana, West-Africa.

Seybold stated that the resulting device will at a minimum meet the specs listed on the website, but could also exceed them. It could also end up having an ARM, MIPS, or x86-based CPU architecture depending on what chips are available.

In an interview, Seybold stated that the Africa was not meant to be sold as a "computer" in the traditional sense, but as an "appliance" to provide Internet access to people who could not afford to buy a traditional computer. He said that with the number of government services (such as unemployment or disability) that are encouraging access by Internet, lack of such access is becoming more and more of a disability. The only thing Cherrypal promised for $99 is the ability to access the Internet.

== Other computers ==
=== Cherrypal Asia ===
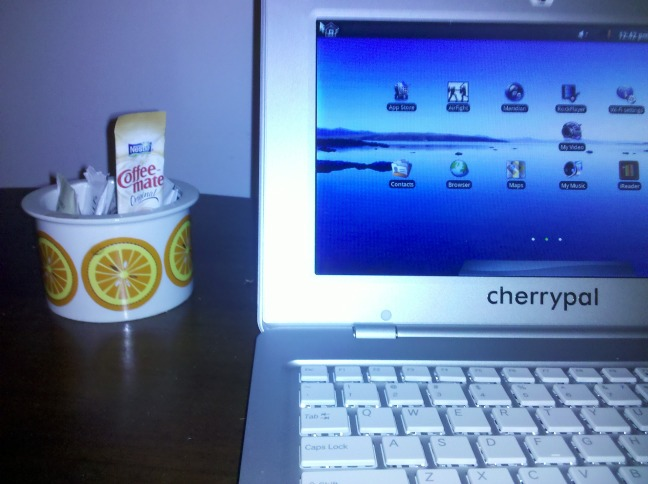
Cherrypal Asia large version running Android.

The "Cherrypal Asia" is a low cost ARM-based netbook that uses Android OS version 1.7.

=== Cherrypal Bing ===
The "Cherrypal Bing" is a slim x86-based netbook that ships with Windows XP.

== Cloud computing plans ==
Cherrypal's marketers planned to use Firefox not only as its web-browser but also as its user interface to launch other applications such as OpenOffice.org. They planned that the Cherrypal would make use of cloud computing in which applications and storage would be wholly or in part Internet-based. These plans have not yet been implemented. The company's president asserted the cloud (Green Maraschino) would be launched in February 2010, however it is not known to have occurred.

== Reception ==
Some commentators observed that Cherrypal arguably beat the heralded and much-better financed One Laptop per Child (OLPC) project to its goal of a $100 "laptop" (such units are physically small: a Cherrypal unit for general purchase at $99 plus shipping has a 7" screen, an OLPC provided to a child in developing world at $199 has a 7.5"). The company's business practices generated controversy and antipathy from some vocally dissatisfied customers, while others were marginally satisfied. Its practices pertaining to merchandise returns and communication have been repeatedly faulted. The U.S. Better Business Bureau rating for Cherrypal is an "F", indicating that the BBB strongly questions the company's reliability.

Cherrypal said that it was committed to addressing the environmental concerns and the needs of impoverished countries and in particular key sponsorship of a learning center in Ghana. It supported a "One Laptop per Teacher" pilot program in Nigeria.

== Timeline ==
- Jan. 2008: C114 model originally shown at CES by its manufacturer THTF.
- Jul. 2008: Cherrypal was originally scheduled to ship in late July 2008.
- November 4, 2008: Rescheduled the ship date for November 4, 2008.
- December 3, 2008: The first end-user report of actually receiving a boxed Cherrypal was posted. Cherrypal stated they had earlier shipped some multiple-unit orders to organizational customers. More users began receiving their Cherrypals, and real-life test reports were released, with mixed responses.
- June 20, 2009: A competitor's blog claimed Cherrypal went out of business in the UK in June 2009 and that "We are not quite sure what has happened with Cherrypal Inc. in the USA."
- Dec. 2009: An upgraded version of the Cherrypal is offered for sale on the company website. Also released were an update for its "Bing" notebook, and a $99 mini-notebook called "Africa."
- January 6, 2010: A Teleread.org editor claimed caution was needed before dealing with Cherrypal. In response to that, and comments to the article from persons accusing Cherrypal of engaging in a scam, Max Seybold sent a "Cease and Desist" email to the website. The site owners then decided to delete all the Cherrypal articles and comments.
- January 11, 2010: A German blogger stated online-tracking showed a shipment of his unit on its way, but that this has never arrived because of a wrong tracking-number sent by Cherrypal. He later stated that he received a unit with specifications less than advertised, and OS other than advertised.
- January 18, 2010: A Mobileread.com editor authored an article accusing Cherrypal of "lies, ignored emails, and technical incompetence," which Mobileread.com ran. The website formerly ran another attack article, "Cherrypal is a SCAM."
- March 20, 2010: An end-user reported that he received a $99 CherryPal Africa Linux version, providing pictures. "As some of the negative internet posters seemed more strident than the situation demanded, I decided to take a chance," his blog reads. A week later another end-user reported Cherrypal Africa receipt, criticizing the shipping delay and software features, though saying "it works."
- May 11, 2010: News forums reported the launch of "Cherrypal Asia," a netbook with ARM processor, Android OS.
- Jun 30, 2010: A user comment at an Android forum indicates receipt of an Asia.
