= AIDA64 =

System information, diagnostics, and auditing program

- Developer: FinalWire Ltd.
- Operating system: Windows, Android, iOS, Tizen, ChromeOS, Sailfish OS, Android TV, Wear OS, Ubuntu Touch
- Predecessor: AIDA32
- Type: System profiler
- License: Proprietary
- Website: www.aida64.com

AIDA64 is a system information, diagnostics, and auditing application developed by FinalWire Ltd (a Hungarian company) that runs on Windows, Android, iOS, ChromeOS, Windows Phone (cancelled), Sailfish OS, Ubuntu Touch and Tizen operating systems. It displays detailed information on the components of a computer. Information can be saved to file in formats such as HTML, CSV, or XML.

== History ==
=== ASMDEMO ===
Aida started in 1995 with the freeware ASMDEMO, a 16 bit DOS hardware analyser software with basic capabilities. The first public release was ASMDEMO v870, provided with CPU and disk benchmarks.

=== AIDA ===
Then, in 2000, AIDA 1.0 was released provided with a hardware database with 12,000 entries, support for 32-bit MMX and SSE benchmarks. It has been written by Tamás Miklós.

=== AIDA32 ===
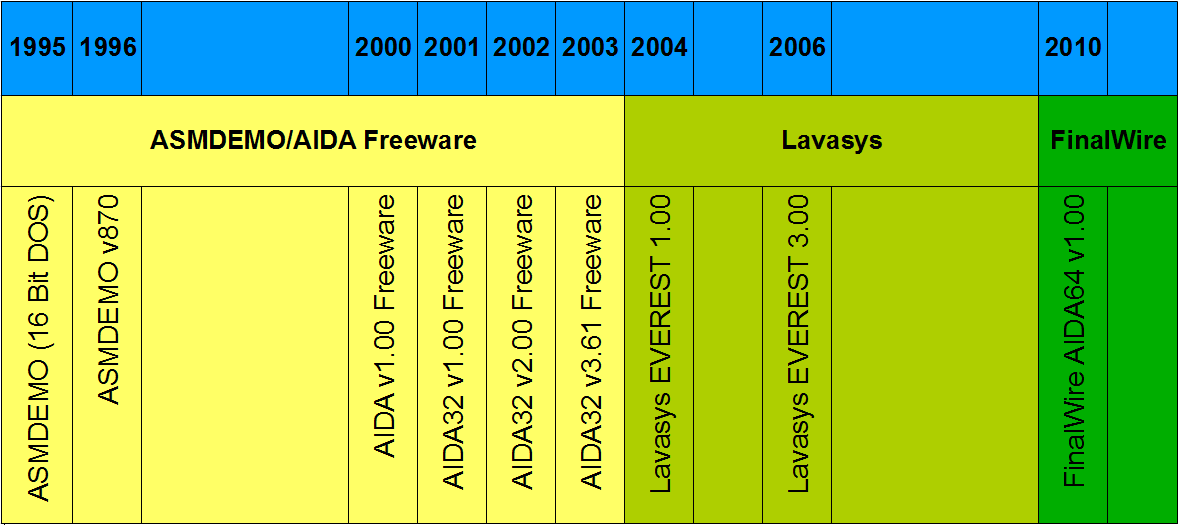
The chart demonstrating the AIDA/Everest software progression and development in the past

In 2001 is released AIDA32 1.0, a 32-bit Windows system diagnostic tool with basic capabilities.

In 2002, AIDA32 2.0 is released adding XML reports and network audit with SQL database support.

In 2003, AIDA32 3.61 is out provided with a hardware database with 25,000 entries, monitor diagnostics and is localized to 23 languages.

The latest version 3.94 was released in March 2000. AIDA32 was distributed as freeware, and as a portable executable file which does not need to be installed on the host computer.

Development of AIDA32 was stopped on March 24, 2004.

=== Everest ===
In April 2004, Miklós was appointed Executive Vice President of Software Engineering Research & Development at Lavalys. The successor of AIDA32 was the commercial Lavalys product Everest.

Lavalys distributed a freeware version of Everest up until version 2.20, which is still available via freeware distribution websites. The freeware Everest Home Edition was discontinued on December 1, 2005 in favour of a full commercial and paid version.

The final and last version of Everest is 5.50, released in April 2010. Everest is now retired in favour of AIDA64.

=== Corsair Memory Dashboard ===
In 2004, Corsair Xpert memory module was released. This is a memory utility freeware based on AIDA32 and exclusively developed for Corsair Memory, Inc.

=== AIDA64 ===
The Everest line was discontinued after the acquisition of Lavalys by FinalWire, a privately held company formed from members working on AIDA since its beginning and located in Budapest, Hungary. Tamás Miklós becomes the managing director of FinalWire. The principal product of FinalWire is AIDA64, taking the place of Everest. This is now not a freeware anymore, but a commercial piece of software limited to 30 day trial before having to choose and pay for a version.

AIDA64 leaps forward by adding a collection of 64 bits processor and memory benchmarks, an optimized ZLib data compression and an enhanced set of fractal computational floating-point benchmarks, a new CPU benchmark method to determine cryptographic hash value calculation performance, support for SSDs (SSD specific SMART entries, etc.) and extending the hardware database to 115,000 elements. All AIDA64 benchmarks are ported to 64-bit and utilize MMX, 3DNow! and SSE instructions to stress the whole potential of modern multi-core Intel and AMD processors. Customers who bought Everest were eligible to a free upgrade to AIDA64 until October 20, 2010.

AIDA64 is available in four editions: in an Extreme edition targeted at home/personal use, AIDA64 Engineer, AIDA64 Business and AIDA64 Network Audit all targeted towards professionals.

On October 6, 2010, the version 1.0 was released. The version 5.20.3400 released in March 2015 had a hardware database holding over 176,000 entries.

On March 5, 2015, FinalWire introduced an Android version of AIDA64. The main features are about displaying information about the SoC, CPU, screen, battery, temperature, WI-FI and cellular network, Android properties, GPU details, other listings of devices (PCI, sensors etc.) and a listing of installed apps, codecs and system directories. A version for the Android Wear platform is also available.

On May 8, 2015, AIDA64 for iOS and Windows Phone have been released to celebrate the 20th anniversary of the software (1995 with ASMDEMO). The Windows Phone application is planned to be converted to a universal app in the second half of 2015.

On July 28, 2015, AIDA64 added supports for new technologies (new generation of Intel processors, AMD and Nvidia GPGPU, new SSDs, and for Windows 10 and Windows Server 2016 operating systems). A version of the mobile application has been released for Tizen, completing the portfolio of supported operating systems. Around this time, a version for Ubuntu Touch was released.

On June 20, 2016, on the AIDA64 Facebook page, a version of AIDA64 for Android was running on a Asus Chromebook running on ChromeOS.

On June 24, 2016, still on the same Facebook page, AIDA64 was announced to be available for Sailfish OS.

For 2024, it has 240,000 database entries.

== Program capabilities ==
Analysis of device configuration and detailed information on:

- installed system devices — CPUs, motherboards, GPUs, sound cards, memory modules, etc.
- their characteristics: clock frequency, power voltage, cache size, etc.
- supported Instruction set and operating modes
- their manufacturers
- installed software
- operating system configuration
- installed drivers
- automatically loaded programs
- running processes
- available licenses

=== PC performance testing ===
A set of benchmarks allows you to test:

- memory read — tests the speed of data transfer from RAM to the processor.
- memory write — tests the speed of data transfer from the processor to RAM.
- memory copy — tests the speed of data transfer from one memory cell to another via the processor's cache.
- memory latency — tests the average time the processor takes to read data from RAM.
- CPU Queen — tests the processor's performance in integer operations by solving the classic "Queen's problem".
- CPU PhotoWorxx — tests the performance of integer arithmetic units, multiplication, and memory subsystem in performing a series of standard RGB image operations.
- CPU ZLib — tests the performance of the processor and memory subsystem in creating ZIP archives using the popular open library zlib. Uses integer operations.
- CPU AES — tests the processor's speed in performing encryption using the AES algorithm. Capable of using low-level encryption commands of VIA processors C3 and C7.
- FPU Julia — tests the performance of the processor's floating-point units in 32-bit precision calculations. Models several fragments of the Julia fractal. Uses MMX, SSE, and 3DNow! instructions where possible.
- FPU Mandel — tests the performance of the processor's floating-point units in 64-bit precision calculations by modeling several fragments of the Mandelbrot fractal. Capable of using SSE2 instructions.
- FPU SinJulia — a more complex version of the FPU Julia test. Tests the performance of the processor's floating-point units in 80-bit precision calculations. Uses x87 instructions intended for trigonometric and exponential functions.

== Editions ==
The program has 4 editions:

- Extreme — diagnostics, testing, and system information gathering for home users;
- Engineer — diagnostics, testing, and system information gathering for engineers;
- Network Audit — network inventory and IT asset management for enterprises
- Business — diagnostics, testing, and system information gathering for IT professionals and enterprises;

And mobile versions of the program for operating systems: Android, iOS, and Sailfish OS. The version for Windows Phone has not been updated since 2017, for Ubuntu Touch — since 2016.
