= Speccy =

Utility software developed by Piriform

- Developer: Piriform Software
- Release: 23 April 2010; 16 years ago
- Stable release: 1.34 / 22 June 2026; 3 months ago
- Operating system: Windows 10, 8.1, 7, Vista and XP, including both 32-bit and 64-bit versions, but not RT tablet editions
- Platform: IA-32 and x64
- Size: 8.6 MB
- Type: Utility software
- License: Freemium
- Website: www.ccleaner.com/speccy

Speccy, developed by Piriform Software, is a freeware utility software and runs under Microsoft Windows 11, Windows 10, Windows 8, Windows 7, Vista and XP for both IA-32 and x64 versions of these operating systems, which shows the user information about hardware and software of the computer. The information displayed by Speccy includes processor brand and model, hard drive size and speed, amount of memory (RAM), information about graphics card and operating system. Speccy is used to monitor what hardware is present in a system and how it is being used.

Lifehacker stated in 2009 that among similar tools, Speccy was the "cleanest and most detailed one we've used yet". Download Squad described the software as "[though] not as detailed as some other system information tools, Speccy still provides a good deal of essential information and gathers it quickly". In 2010, PC World stated that the beta test version "gives you a remarkable amount of technical detail" that is "more comprehensive than other tools like Systeminfo". In its 2012 review Softpedia rated version 1.24.632 four stars (of five).

As of Windows 10 version 1511 released in November 2015, Speccy versions 1.28.709 and before are automatically uninstalled after downloading the update. Speccy 1.29.714 was released on 3 December to restore Speccy to Windows 10 after the November update.

== See also ==
- Belarc Advisor
- CPU-Z
