= Mission critical =

Factor critical to the operation of an organization

A mission critical (also mission essential) factor of a system is any factor (component, equipment, personnel, process, procedure, software, etc.) that is essential to business, organizational, or governmental operations. Failure or disruption of mission critical factors would have a serious impact on business, organization, or government operations, and can even cause social turmoil and catastrophes.

== Mission critical systems ==
A mission critical system is a system that is essential to the survival of a business or organization. When a mission critical system fails or is interrupted, business operations are significantly impacted. Mission essential equipment and mission critical application are also known as mission critical system. Examples of mission critical systems are: an online banking system, railway/aircraft operating and control systems, electric power systems, and many other computer systems that will adversely affect business and society when they fail.

A good example of a mission critical system is a navigational system for a spacecraft. The difference between mission critical and business critical lies in the major adverse impact and the very real possibilities of loss of life, serious injury and/or financial loss.

There are four different types of critical systems: mission critical, business critical, safety critical and security critical. The key difference between a safety critical system and mission critical system, is that safety critical system is a system that, if it fails, may result in serious environmental damage, injury, or loss of life, while mission critical system may result in failure in goal-directed activity. An example of a safety critical system is a chemical manufacturing plant control system. Mission critical system and business critical system are similar terms, but a business critical system fault can influence only a single company or an organization and can partially stop lifetime activity (hours or days). Security critical system may lead to loss of sensitive data through theft or accidental loss. All these four systems are generalized as critical system.

As a rule in crisis management, if a triage-type decision is made in which certain components must be eliminated or delayed, e.g. because of resource or personnel constraints, mission critical ones must not be among them.

== Examples ==
Every business companies and organizations will have mission critical systems if they are functioning. A downed filtration system will cause the water filtration company to malfunction. In this case, the water filtration system is a mission critical system. If a gas system is downed, many restaurants and bakeries will have to shut down until the system functions well again. In this case, the gas system is a mission critical system. There are various other mission critical systems that, if they malfunction, will have serious impacts on other industries or organizations.

=== Navigating system of an aircraft ===
The aircraft is highly dependent on the navigating system. Air navigation is accomplished with many methods. Dead reckoning utilizes visual checkpoints along with distance and time calculations. The flight computer system aids the pilots to calculate the time and distance of the checkpoint that they set. The radio navigation aid (NAVAIDS) enables the pilots to navigate more accurately than dead reckoning alone, and in conditions of low visibility, radio navigation is handy. GPS is also used by pilots and uses 24 U.S. Department of Defence satellites to provide precise locational data, which includes speed, position, and track.

If two-way radio communication malfunctions, the pilots have to follow the steps in the Title 14 of the Code of Federal Regulations (14 CFR) part 91. Pneumatic system failure, the associated loss of altitude, and various unfamiliar situations may cause stress and loss of situational awareness. In this case, pilot should use instruments such as navigators to seek more information about the situational data. In this case, the malfunction of the navigation system would be mission critical and would cause serious consequences.

=== Nuclear reactor safety system ===
A nuclear reactor is a system that controls and contains the sustained nuclear chain reaction. It is usually used for generating electricity, but can also be used for conducting research and producing medical isotopes. Nuclear reactors have been one of the most concerning systems for public safety worldwide because the malfunction of a nuclear reactor can cause a serious disaster. Controlling the nuclear reactor system is accomplished by stopping, decreasing, or increasing the chain reaction inside the nuclear reactor. Varying the water level in the vertical cylinder and moving adjuster rods are the methods of controlling the chain reaction when the reactor is operating. Temperatures, reactor power levels, and pressure are constantly monitored by the sensitive detectors.

== History ==
The mission critical is a business's quintessence and if failed, will cause serious financial and reputational damages. Today, as the companies develop and world becomes more web-based community, the range of mission critical has extended. But the mission critical computing has been evolving since the pre-Web era (before 1995). In the entirely text-based pre-web internet, gopher was one of the ASCII-based end-user programs. The mission critical system was basically used in transactional applications during this era. A business process management software, ERP, and airline reservation systems were usually mission critical. These applications were run on dedicated system in the data center. There were limited number of end users and usually accessed via terminals and personal computers.

After the pre-Web era, the Web era (1995 - 2010) rose. The range of mission critical increased to include electronic devices and web applications. More users were able to use to the internet and electronic devices, so larger number of end users were able to access increased mission critical applications. Therefore, the customers are expecting limitless availability and stronger security in the devices they are using. The businesses also start to become more web-based and this correspondingly increases the criminal associated with the money and fraud. This increase in range of mission critical made the security to become stronger and increased the security industries. Between 1995 and 2010, number of web users globally increased from 16 million to 1.7 billion. This shows increase in global reliance on web system.

After the Web era, consumerization era (2010 and beyond) has risen. The range of mission critical is even more increased due to increase in social, mobile, and customer-facing applications. The consumerization of IT became greater, organizations increased and web and IT availabilities to the people increased. Social business, customer service, and customer support applications have increased greatly, so mission critical was expanded further. According to Gartner, native PC projects will be outnumbered by mobile development projects by the ratio of 4:1. Therefore, today's mission critical now encloses all subjects crucial for customer based service, business operation, employee productivity, and finance. The customers' expectations rose and small disruption can cause tremendous loss in the business. It was estimated that Amazon could have lost as much as $1,100 per second in net sales when it was suffering from an outage, and a five-minute outage of Google lost Google more than $545,000. Failure in mission critical and even short time of outage can cause high price of downtime due to reputations damages. Longer periods of downtime of mission critical systems can result in even more serious problems to the industries or organizations.

== Safety & security ==
Mission critical systems should remain very secured in all industries or organization using it. Therefore, the industries are using various security systems to avoid mission critical failures. Mainframes or workstations based companies are all dependent on database and process control, so database and process control would be mission critical for them. Hospital patient recording, call centers, stock exchanges, data storage centers, flight control tower, and many other industries that are dependent on communication system and computer should be protected from the shutdown of the system and they are considered mission critical. All the companies and industries are unavoidable to the unexpected or extraordinary problems that can cause shutdown to the mission critical. To avoid this, using the safety systems is considered very important part in the business.

=== Transport Layer Security (TLS) ===
The Transport Layer Security (TLS; formerly, Secure Socket Layers, SSL) refers to the standard security technology of networking protocol that controls and manages client and server authentication, and encrypt communication. This is usually used in the online transaction websites such as PayPal and Bank of America, which if systems are downed or hacked, will cause serious problems to the society and the companies themselves. In TLS, public-key and symmetric-key (encryption) are used together to secure the connection between two machines. Usually it is utilized in mail services or client machines that communicates via internet. To use this technology, the web server requires a digital certificate and this can be obtained through completing several questions about the identity of the website and get public keys and private keys (cryptographic keys). The industries using this technology may be also required to pay certain amount of money annually.

=== Shutdown systems ===
Nuclear power plants need safety systems to avoid mission-critical failures. The worst possible consequence that can result is leakage of radioactive materials (U-235 or Pu-239). One of the systems to avoid mission critical failures for nuclear power plants is shutdown system. It has two different forms: rod controls and safety injection control. When a problem occurs in the nuclear power plant, the rod control shutdown system drops the rods automatically and stops the chain reaction. The safety injection control injects liquid immediately when the system faces the problem in nuclear reactor and stops the chain reaction. Both systems are usually automatically operated, but also can be manually activated.

== Real time and mission critical ==
Real time and mission critical are often confused by many people but they are not the same concept.

=== Real time ===
Real time is responsiveness of a computer that makes the computer to continually update on external processes, and should process the procedure or information in a specified time, or could result in serious consequences. Video games are examples of real time since they are rendered by computer so rapidly, it is hard to notice the delay by the user. Each frame must be rendered in a short time to maintain the experience of interactivity. The speed of rendering graphics may vary according to the computer systems.

==== Types of real time systems ====
- Hard real-time system shouldn't miss the specified time or can result in serious consequences. It is non-negotiable in timing and it is "wrong answer" if the deadline is missed. The example of hard real time system is airbags for cars.
- Soft real-time system has more loose deadline. The system can handle the problems and functions normally even though the deadline is missed, but their functionality depends on fast-paced processes. An example for soft-real time can be typing, which, if delayed, people will get annoyed, but answer still is correct.
- Non real-time system doesn't have certain or absolute deadlines. However, the throughput of the activity of performance can still be very essential.

=== Differences ===
Real time is a software that if specific time is not met, it fails, but mission critical is a system if failed, will result in catastrophic consequences. Although they go hand-in-hand, since real time can be mission critical, they are not the same concepts. These two are often confused by many people, but they are different concepts, but associated with each other.

== Mission critical personnel and mission critical systems planning ==
=== Social survival ===
From the perspective of social function (i.e.: preserving society's life support structure, and overall structure intact), Mission critical aspects of social function would necessitate the provision of basic needs for society. Such basic needs are often said to include food (this includes food production and distribution), water, clothing (not an immediate need in an emergency), sanitation (sewage is an immediate need, but physical waste/garbage/rubbish disposal is not an immediate need in an emergency), housing/shelter, energy (not immediate) and health needs (not immediate in a healthy population). The prior list is not exhaustive. Longer term needs might include communications/transport needs in a developed population. This list of needs is associated with mission critical personnel in a clear manner - food production requires farmers, food distribution requires transportation personnel, water requires water-infrastructure maintenance personnel (a long term requirement if existing water infrastructure has been maintained to a high standard), clothing tends to require individuals to maintain clothes production infrastructure, similarly for sanitation. In emergencies, housing/shelter requires someone to build the shelter and maintain it over the long term if necessary. Health needs are met by doctors, nurses and surgeons. Implicit use of infrastructure requires personnel to maintain that infrastructure also - so food transportation requires not only that there are drivers for food trucks, but also that (over the long term) there are highways maintenance personnel who can maintain the roads, traffic infrastructure and signs for the roads, this in turn requires power supply personnel to provide power for traffic lights, etc... In this light, mission-critical systems have a complex dependency network which enables analysis of the level of interconnected dependencies between different aspects of a mission-critical system, which can be useful in planning, or just for gaining a truthful picture of how mission criticality is organised in complex systems. This would enable the determination of choke points in a complex system, points at which a mission-critical system (or set of systems) is vulnerable in one sense or another. Ideas that relate to human resources and human resources planning (making use of Gantt charts for project management, etc...) are also relevant.

Mission criticality depends upon the timescale associated with basic needs or other deemed mission-critical factors. Over the medium term (often taken to be 10 years) and the long term (which can go into 50-60 year timescales), the planning for mission-critical systems will clearly differ from short-term mission-critical systems planning. Mission-critical personnel can be considered part of the mission-critical systems planning paradigm but require a different approach to technological or mechanical aspects of mission-critical systems (i.e.: they require human resources planning).

=== Attributes of mission critical personnel ===
Psychometrics enables the determination and characterisation of various psychological aspects of mission-critical personnel (e.g.: their IQ in the case of highly skilled work, such as nuclear physics, for example). Some jobs require physical standards (for instance, in the army), or physical dexterity (e.g.: surgeons). There exist methods and means of characterising the types of skills, qualities and other attributes that certain mission-critical job roles require, and these can be used as benchmarks for determining whether certain individuals are well suited to a particular mission-critical job role, or what assistance a less qualified (or even less capable) individual would need in performing a certain mission-critical job role which might be beyond their abilities (such measures might have to be taken in emergency situations).

== See also ==
- Life-critical system
- Critical infrastructure protection
- Downtime
