= Koplik (disambiguation) =

Koplik, or Koplik i Poshtëm, is a town in northwestern Albania.

Koplik may also refer to:

- Dimiat, a Bulgarian wine grape also known as Koplik
- Koplik (surname), a family name
