= Functional holography =

Method of analysis

Functional Holography (FH) is a method of analysis designed to extract the maximum amount of functional information about the dynamical network as a whole unit.

Itay Baruchi and his Ph.D. supervisor, Eshel Ben-Jacob, introduced the Functional Holography (FH) methodology. The FH analysis was devised to study the dynamics of task performing dynamical networks (such as brain activity and neural networks, and gene networks or recorded data of dynamics system such as stock market parameters or biological chips activities).

The new approach is based on the realization that task-performing networks follow some underlying principles that should be reflected and therefore be detected in their activity. Where the analysis is designed to decipher the existence of simple causal motives that are expected to be embedded in the observed complex activity of the networks are noticeable. Many studies have applied the FH analysis to modeled and real networks or complex data (such as recorded brain activity, gene microarray data, antigen microarray data and even financial data) the characteristic geometrical and topological features are deciphered in the complex activity.

== History ==
The Functional Holography analysis method was first introduced in 2004 by Itai Baruchi and Eshel Ben-Jacob, for analysis of recorded human brain activity. The term hologram stands for “whole”—holo in Greek, plus “information” or “message”—gram in Greek.

In a holographic photography, the information describing a 3D object is encoded on a two-dimensional photographic film, ready to be regenerated into a holographic image or hologram. A characteristic feature is the “whole in every part” nature of the process—a small part of the photographic film can generate the whole picture, but with fewer details. Another property is high tolerance to noise and high robustness to lesion: even with many imperfections or with several pixels removed, the image of the object as a whole is still retained in the hologram. To magnify a part of the original 3D object, one needs to produce a new photographic film for the part to be magnified. Another related feature is the holographic superposition—when illuminated together (placed side by side), two holograms can generate a superposition of the corresponding two 3D objects. Superposition of objects can also be made by imprinting the images of the two (or more) 3D objects on the same holographic film. These and other special features of hologram are due to the way the information is encoded on the films—not a direct projection of the picture in real space but in the correlations between the pixels. These are converted back to a picture in three dimensions by proper illumination.

The above properties of holograms guided the development and are the rationale behind the functional holography method presented here. The term “functional” is to indicate that the analysis is in the space of functional correlations that serve the analogue role to the long-range correlations imprinted on the photographic film (by the use of the interference of coherent lights). The Functional Holography methodology shares the special features of holograms—tolerance to noise, robustness to lesion, holographic superposition and holographic zooming.

== Algorithm ==
1. Evaluation of the matrix of similarities (correlations) between the activities of the network’s components.
2. Collective normalization of the similarities – the affinity transformation - to construct a matrix of functional correlations.
3. The Projection of affinity matrix using dimension reduction algorithms (the Principal Component Analysis, PCA) onto a principal three-dimensional space of the leading eigenvectors computed by the algorithm.
4. Retrieval of information that is lost in the dimension reduction - the nodes are connected by color-coded lines that represent the level of similarities, which is then used to construct a holographic network in the principal space.
