= Koplik (surname) =

Koplik or Koplík (Czech feminine: Koplíková) is a surname. Notable people with the surname include:

- Henry Koplik (1858–1927), American physician
- Jim Koplik, American concert promoter
- Joel Koplik, American physicist
- Tomáš Koplík (born 1986), Czech slalom canoeist
