= CPU-Z =

Freeware system profiling and monitoring application for Microsoft Windows and Android

- CPU-Z 2.03.1 under Windows 11, showing information about an Intel Core i5-7200U
- Developer: CPUID
- Stable release: 2.20.1 / 14 May 2026; 6 months ago
- Operating system: Microsoft Windows, Android
- Platform: IA-32, x86-64, ARM
- Size: 4.60 MB
- Available in: English, Chinese
- Type: System profiler
- License: Freeware
- Website: www.cpuid.com/softwares/cpu-z.html

CPU-Z is a freeware system profiling and monitoring software developed by CPUID. It provides information about central processing unit, RAM, motherboard chipset, and other hardware features of a modern personal computer or Android device.

== Overview ==
CPU-Z is a freeware tool that is supported on Windows and Android. It identifies various hardware components, and thus assists in identifying certain components. Particularly the core revision and RAM clock rate. When the program is opened, it shows a CPU tab screen initially. It also provides information on the system's GPU. The program is used for checking hardware components in a quick way. While CPU-Z is system profiler software, it may not always display complete or accurate information about hardware components due to variations in CPUs, chipsets, BIOS, and motherboard.

== Features ==
The program provides tabs and features for:

- CPU - provides processor name, package, code names, and core speed
- Mainboard - shows motherboard manufacturer, model names, BIOS information, and chipset
- Memory - shows memory types, size and frequency
- SPD - provides information about memory modules and specifications, with frequency and sizes
- Graphics - shows GPU name, memory sizes, and code name
- Bench - provides CPU benchmarks, of which users can also do processor tests
- About - shows the program version, and tools that includes saving reports

== See also ==
- GPU-Z
- Speccy
