= GPU-Z =

Windows utility software

- GPU-Z 2.71.0 under Windows 11, showing information about an NVIDIA GeForce GT 1030
- Developer: TechPowerUp
- Stable release: 2.71.0 / 23 September 2026; 54 days ago
- Operating system: Windows XP, Vista, 7, 8, 8.1, 10, 11
- License: Freeware
- Website: www.techpowerup.com/gpuz/

TechPowerUp GPU-Z (or just GPU-Z) is a lightweight utility designed to provide information about video cards and GPUs. The program displays the specifications of Graphics Processing Unit (often shortened to GPU) and its memory; also displays temperature, core frequency, memory frequency, GPU load and fan speeds. It can also allow one to dump the VBIOS and compare it to other via the TechPowerUp VGA BIOS database.

== Features ==
This program allows to view the following information of the video card:

- Graphics card's name
- Fake GPU detection
- GPU internal codename
- Technology process
- Chip die size
- Number of transistors
- Support for DirectX / pixel shader
- Memory type
- Amount of video memory
- Memory bandwidth
- Type of bus
- Width of the bus
- Frequency of the GPU (default / overclocked)
- Memory clock
- Driver version
- VBIOS version
- Sensors
- GPU core clock
- GPU memory clock
- Low GPU
- Fan speed
- Nvidia SLI/AMD CrossFire

== TechPowerUp ==
TechPowerUp is also the developer of the GPU-Z. It also produces PC hardware, particularly graphics processing units (GPUs) and central processing units (CPUs). Founded in 2004, it provides hardware reviews, benchmarking analysis, industry news, and maintains a GPU specifications database.

== See also ==
- CPU-Z
