= Index cohesive force =

Concept in finance

The index cohesive force (ICF) concept has been introduced by Dror Y. Kenett and his Ph.D. supervisor Eshel Ben-Jacob, as a new quantitative measure of the index effect on financial markets. The ICF is formally defined as the balance (ratio) between the raw stock correlations that include the index effect and the residual stock correlations (or partial correlations) after subtraction of the index effect. Defined this way, the ICF provides a means to identify structural changes in the market, which can render it prone to systemic collapses: High values of the ICF characterize a state in which the index predominantly affects the market dynamics while it shades the effect of other degrees of freedom that can contribute to the market flexibility. Thus high values of the ICF correspond to a state in which the market index dominates the behavior of the market, thus making it stiff and hence during such a state the market is highly prone to systematic collapses, even due to relatively small external perturbations, leaving it incapable of coping with crises.

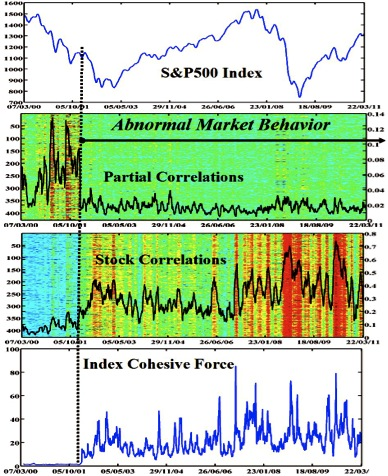
The transition from normal (healthy) market behavior into abnormal seizure-like behavior at the end of 2001 (the vertical dashed line). Top is the S&P Index from March 7, 2000 until March 22, 2011. The third panel shows the stock correlations and the second panel shows the partial correlations (the correlations after subtraction of the index effect). The decrease in the partial correlations manifests the abnormal dominance of the Index. This effect is further pronounced when looking at the Index Cohesive Force – the ratio between the stock correlations and the partial correlations, shown at the bottom panel.

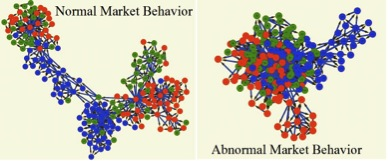
The network topology before the transition (left) and after the transition (right)

== Application ==
Recently, the ICF was employed to investigate the time dynamics of the S&P500 during the last decade. The analysis revealed a fast dramatic transition at the end of 2001, from a healthy market characterized by relatively strong residual correlations into an abnormal market behavior signified by very strong correlations together with vanishing residual correlations. This situation, of strong index cohesive force (high ratio between the correlations and residual correlations), is a signature of an over dominance of the index. Such dominance renders the market stiff and prone to systemic collapses. Closer inspection revealed that the anomalously strong index effect is due to the excessive dominance of the financial sector. This dominance and the consequent market stiffness during this period are manifested in the emergence of market "seizure" behavior – bursts of very high stock correlations that usually coincide with local minima in the index and high volatility.

It is proposed that the dangerous excessive dominance of the financial sector might have been a direct consequence of the US hasty and drastic interest rate cuts and other remedies used in 2001 to overcome the fallout effect of the "dot com" bubble collapse. The abnormal dominance of the financial sector rendered the market prone to a systemic collapse. Hence, eventually, those remedies led to the recent market collapse upon the burst of the subprime bubble and the fall of the Lehman Brothers Bank.

"Accepting this picture", says Ben-Jacob, who also conducts research in human epilepsy, "we realize that while the current US policy makers talk about change, in practice they rely on cosmetic changes and avoid the major and painful surgery needed to cure the market."

Thus, the ICF is a new quantitative measure to assess the stability and well-being of financial markets. It can also be used to compare different markets, and study the coupling between different international markets.
