= Sergei Petrovskii =

British mathematician

Sergei Petrovskii is a Russian-born British mathematician whose research mostly focuses on modeling of complex ecological systems. He is a professor of Applied Mathematics at the University of Leicester. In 2015, he led a study that found that if the ocean temperature were to increase by about six degrees Celsius due to global warming, phytoplankton might stop producing oxygen. This would lead to shortages of oxygen in the atmosphere, which could be very harmful to humans. Petrovskii said, "About two thirds of the planet's total atmospheric oxygen is produced by ocean phytoplankton - and therefore cessation would result in the depletion of atmospheric oxygen on a global scale. This would likely result in the mass mortality of animals and humans." Petrovskii's study appeared in the Bulletin of Mathematical Biology.

Another stream of his research is modelling of biological invasions where he discovered a new phenomenon called "patchy invasion". Contrary to a commonly used paradigm of alien species spread by a travelling population front, in the patchy invasion the invasive species spreads into new areas by creating individual patches not preceded by a front propagation. Patchy invasion has been observed in several invasions of insects and birds and has been studied theoretically using a variety of growth-dispersal models.
