= Hwinfo =

System monitoring software

HWiNFO
- Other names: HWiNFO64, HWiNFO32
- Original author: Martin Malik
- Developer: REALiX
- Release: 1995, MS-DOS
- Written in: C++, Assembly
- Operating system: HWiNFO 16: MS-DOS; HWiNFO 32: Windows 95 OSR2 and later HWiNFO 64: Windows 7 and later
- Platform: x86-32, x86-64, ARM64
- License: Freeware for non-commercial use
- Website: www.hwinfo.com

HWiNFO (also known as HWiNFO64 for 64-bit builds) is a proprietary system monitoring, system profiling and system diagnostics program for Windows and MS-DOS-based systems. It is developed by Martin Malik and REALiX.

It was used by NASA during several tests of different microprocessors, including AMD's Ryzen 3 1200 and Intel's i5-6600K.

The program displays, monitors and logs the following items:

- CPU
- GPU (granted the appropriate operating system drivers are installed)
- RAM (including speed and memory timings)
- Storage (certain SMART information and OS counters) not limited to HDD and SSD
- The number of hardware errors
- Virtual memory use

== Operating systems support ==
- HWiNFO 7.72 is the last version to support Windows XP and Vista
- HWiNFO 6.26 is the last version to support MS-DOS
