= Belarc =

American software company

Belarc Inc.
- Type: Private
- Industry: Computer software
- Founded: 1996; 30 years ago
- Headquarters: Maynard, Massachusetts, U.S.
- Key people: Gary Newman (president); Sumin Tchen (chairman)
- Products: BelManage; Data Analytics module BelSecure; Belarc Advisor
- Website: belarc.com

Belarc Inc. is an American software company. The company's products are used for software license management, configuration management, cyber security status, information assurance audits, IT asset management, and more.

Products by Belarc are in use on well over fifty million computers and are licensed by numerous customers, including: AIA/Asia, Catholic Relief Services, Federal Aviation Administration, NASA, Oakland County Michigan, Railinc, Travelers, U.S. Air Force, U.S. Army, U.S. Bureau of Land Management, U.S. Navy, Unilever, WebMD/Emdeon.

== BelManage ==
BelManage automatically creates an accurate and up-to-date central repository CMDB, consisting of detailed software, hardware, and security configurations.

== Data Analytics ==
Belarc's Data Analytics Module is an add-on module to BelManage which provides optimization of software licensing and maintenance costs along with flexible analysis of your BelManage Cyber Security data.

== Belarc Advisor ==
The Belarc Advisor is a free download licensed for personal use only. The Belarc Advisor builds a detailed profile of installed software and hardware, missing security patches, anti-virus status, and NIST SCAP security configurations (USGCB, FDCC) and displays the results in a Web browser. All of the profile information is kept private on the user's computer and is not sent to any web server. There are over 500,000 downloads of the Belarc Advisor every month.

The report is divided into a number of sections. The summary report lists details of the computer's hardware, local user and system accounts, a map of the local area network, lists of software licence keys and installed Hotfixes, and an inventory of the installed software with an indication of when each piece of software was last used.

The Security Benchmark Score report, on a separate page, is generated only for Windows 7, Vista, and XP Pro, but not for Windows 10 or Windows 11. It details the computer's compliance with US Government Configuration Baseline benchmarks, developed by the United States Department of Defense and National Institute of Standards and Technology. The benchmarks are grouped into general categories. The status of compliance with each benchmark, and the overall compliance per category, are shown. Administrators of commercial versions of Windows can use the Group Policy Editing tool – which can be configured to display USGCB benchmarks – to resolve many of these non-compliances.

== History ==
Belarc was founded in 1997 by Gary Newman and Sumin Tchen. Jack Goldman, the creator of Xerox's Palo Alto Research Center (Xerox PARC), was an early director of the company. Belarc is owned by its founders and employees.
