= Joel Koplik =

American physicist

Joel Koplik is an American physicist.

Koplik earned a Bachelor of Science in physics from the Cooper Union in 1969 and completed his studies in the subject with a PhD at the University of California, Berkeley in 1974. He has been a professor of physics at the City College of New York since 1989. Koplik is also affiliated with CCNY's Benjamin Levich Institute for Physico-Chemical Hydrodynamics, where he leads the Joel Koplik Laboratory. In 1992, Koplik was elected a fellow of the American Physical Society.
