= Biocomplexity =

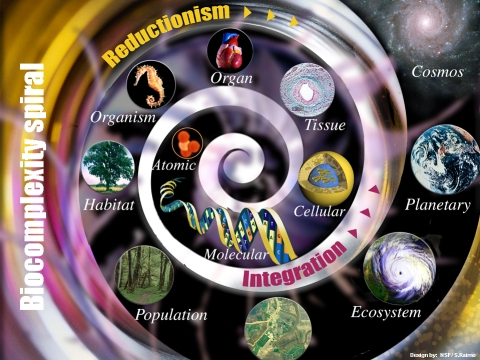
Biocomplexity spiral

Biocomplexity is the study of complex structures and behaviors that arise from nonlinear interactions of active biological agents, which may range in scale from molecules to cells to organisms. Almost every biological system exhibits complexity - emergent properties where the ensemble possesses capabilities that its individual agents lack. Classical examples of biocomplexity include the behavior of molecular motors during DNA transcription, genetic and metabolic networks within cells, the interacting filaments of the cytoskeleton, which allow the cell to move, the differentiation, organization and movement of cells during embryonic development, the function of the networks of neurons which compose the brain and the schooling of fish or birds.

Primarily as a result of funding policy changes at the American National Science Foundation around 2000, some researchers have begun to use the term biocomplexity in a narrower sense to denote the complex behavioral, biological, social, chemical, and physical interactions of living organisms with their environment. This relatively new subfield of biocomplexity encompasses other domains such as biodiversity and ecology.

== See also ==
- Biological degeneracy
- Complex systems
- Evolution of complexity
- Gaia hypothesis
- Systems biology
- System theory
