= System profiler =

A system profiler is software that reports relatively comprehensive information about the host computer system software and attached hardware.

Historically, when computers were primarily mainframes using punch card readers for input, computers had relatively fixed configurations with little variation in input or output devices, and as such, there was little need to query the computer for information about its attached devices. The value of querying a machine for its capabilities grew as computers evolved to have more modular hardware and software designs.

The information reported by a system profiler might be available to the user although not as an integrated report. For example, the VM/370 command QUERY displays the addresses of attached devices and the size of storage.

Sometimes conflated with system profiler, a system monitor is a significantly different capability. It runs continuously in the background and measures and stores performance information. In contrast, a system profiler runs on-demand and reports what the system consists of, not how it is performing.

== Examples ==
=== MacOS ===
The first system profiler, called System Profiler, was for classic Mac OS. This utility defined the term even though other system profilers, including the latest GUI version from Apple, don't use the term in their name.

In modern macOS, the built-in, GUI system profiler is called System Information. The built-in command-line system profiler, at path /usr/sbin/system_profiler, includes more detailed information.

=== Windows ===
In Windows, the built-in, GUI system profiler, System Information, is accessed via the properties "My Computer" or "This PC," pressing the Windows key and Pause/Break key simultaneously, or by running msinfo32.exe. The built-in command-line profiler is run via command systeminfo. Third-party utilities include:

Belarc
Reports host hardware and software as a local webpage. Also, assess how secure the system is, and links missing updates directly to a Microsoft website for download.
CPU-Z
Useful when overclocking processors.
SekChek Local
Security audit tool which scans multiple workstations and servers. It creates a security assessment report file formatted as a Microsoft Access dataset.
Speccy
Reports detailed specifications of various PC subsystems.
System Information for Windows (SIW)
Reports software, hardware, and network information as well as miscellaneous tools.

=== Unix-like ===
Unix-like systems generally do not include a system profiler per se. They include command-line utilities that provide the information typically found in a system profiler report but via multiple utilities, not as an integrated report from a single utility. For example, although uname -a reports basic information about the host machine and lshw lists devices and their properties, neither nor both together are considered a system profiler.

== See also ==
- Microsoft Diagnostics
- Utility software
