= System Information (Windows) =

Windows built-in system profiler

- System Information on Windows 11
- Developer: Microsoft
- Operating system: Microsoft Windows
- Type: System profiler
- Website: https://support.microsoft.com/en-us/help/300887/description-of-microsoft-system-information-msinfo32-tool

System Information (msinfo32.exe) is a system profiler included with Microsoft Windows that displays diagnostic and troubleshooting information related to the operating system, hardware and software. It has been bundled with Windows since Windows NT 4.0.

It compiles technical information on the overall system, hardware resources (including memory, I/O, etc.), physical hardware components (CD-ROM, sound, network, etc.), and the Windows environment as well (drivers, environment variables, services, etc.). It can export this information in the plain text format or in files with a .nfo extension, which can be used to diagnose problems. In addition, System Information can be used to gather technical information on a remote computer on the same network.

== Command-line utility ==
A command-line counterpart exists in the form of systeminfo. This utility is included in Windows versions from Windows XP onwards and in ReactOS. (Note: The ReactOS version of systeminfo was developed by Dmitry Chapyshev and Rafal Harabien. It is licensed under the GPL.) It produces summary output of hardware/software operating environment parameters. The detailed configuration information about the computer and its operating system includes data on the operating system configuration, security information, product ID, and hardware properties, such as RAM, disk space, and network cards.

== See also ==
- MSConfig
