= Rhodopirellula rosea =

Scientific classification
- Domain: Bacteria
- Kingdom: Pseudomonadati
- Phylum: Planctomycetota
- Class: Planctomycetia
- Order: Pirellulales
- Family: Pirellulaceae
- Genus: Rhodopirellula
- Species: R. rosea

Binomial name
- Rhodopirellula rosea Roh et al. 2014

Type strain
- JCM 17759, KACC 15560, strain LHWP3

Species of bacterium

Rhodopirellula rosea is a Gram-negative and motile bacterium from the genus of Rhodopirellula which has been isolated from a dead ark clam (Scapharca broughtonii) from the Gangjin Bay in Korea.
