= Rhodopirellula caenicola =

Scientific classification
- Domain: Bacteria
- Kingdom: Pseudomonadati
- Phylum: Planctomycetota
- Class: Planctomycetia
- Order: Pirellulales
- Family: Pirellulaceae
- Genus: Rhodopirellula
- Species: R. caenicola

Binomial name
- Rhodopirellula caenicola Yoon et al. 2015

Type strain
- KCTC 32995, NBRC 110016, strain YM26-125

Species of bacterium

Rhodopirellula caenicola is a Gram-negative, strictly aerobic and non-motile bacterium from the genus of Rhodopirellula which has been isolated from isolated from iron sand.
