= Thermogutta =

Scientific classification
- Domain: Bacteria
- Kingdom: Pseudomonadati
- Phylum: Planctomycetota
- Class: Planctomycetia
- Order: Pirellulales
- Family: Thermoguttaceae
- Genus: Thermogutta; Slobodkina et al. 2015

Type species
- Thermogutta terrifontis Slobodkina et al. 2015

Species
- T. hypogea; T terrifontis

Genus of bacteria

Thermogutta is a thermophilic genus of bacteria from the family of Planctomycetaceae.

== See also ==
- List of bacterial orders
- List of bacteria genera
