= Rhodopirellula baltica =

Scientific classification
- Domain: Bacteria
- Kingdom: Pseudomonadati
- Phylum: Planctomycetota
- Class: Planctomycetia
- Order: Pirellulales
- Family: Pirellulaceae
- Genus: Rhodopirellula
- Species: R. baltica

Binomial name
- Rhodopirellula baltica Schlesner et al. 2004

Type strain
- DSM 10527, IFAM 1310, NCIMB 13988, SH 1

Species of bacterium

Rhodopirellula baltica is a bacterium from the genus Rhodopirellula which has been isolated from brackish water from the Baltic Sea.
