= Thermostilla =

Scientific classification
- Domain: Bacteria
- Kingdom: Pseudomonadati
- Phylum: Planctomycetota
- Class: Planctomycetia
- Order: Pirellulales
- Family: Thermoguttaceae
- Genus: Thermostilla; Slobodkina et al. 2016

Type species
- Thermostilla marina Slobodkina et al. 2016

Species
- T. marina

Thermophilic genus of bacteria

Thermostilla is a thermophilic genus of bacteria from the family Planctomycetaceae with one known species (Thermostilla marina). Thermostilla marina has been isolated from a hydrothermal vent from Vulcano Island in Italy.
