= Roseimaritima =

Scientific classification
- Domain: Bacteria
- Kingdom: Pseudomonadati
- Phylum: Planctomycetota
- Class: Planctomycetia
- Order: Pirellulales
- Family: Pirellulaceae
- Genus: Roseimaritima; Bondoso et al. 2016

Type species
- Roseimaritima ulvae Bondoso et al. 2016

Species
- R. multifibrata; R. sediminicola; R. ulvae

Genus of bacteria

Roseimaritima is a genus of bacteria from the family of Planctomycetaceae with three known species. Roseimaritima ulvae has been isolated from an Ulva from Carreço in Portugal.

== Phylogeny ==
The currently accepted taxonomy is based on the List of Prokaryotic names with Standing in Nomenclature (LPSN) and National Center for Biotechnology Information (NCBI).

16S rRNA based LTP_08_2023

- Roseimaritima
  - R. sediminicola Kumar et al. 2020
  - - R. multifibrata Wiegand et al. 2021
    - R. ulvae Bondoso et al. 2016

120 marker proteins based GTDB 10-RS226

- Roseimaritima
  - R. multifibrata
  - - R. sediminicola
    - R. ulvae

== See also ==
- List of bacterial orders
- List of bacteria genera
