= Thermogutta terrifontis =

Scientific classification
- Domain: Bacteria
- Kingdom: Pseudomonadati
- Phylum: Planctomycetota
- Class: Planctomycetia
- Order: Pirellulales
- Family: Thermoguttaceae
- Genus: Thermogutta
- Species: T. terrifontis

Binomial name
- Thermogutta terrifontis Slobodkina et al. 2015

Type strain
- DSM 26237, VKM B-2805, strain R1

Species of bacterium

Thermogutta terrifontis is a thermophilic bacterium from the genus of Thermogutta which has been isolated from a hot spring from Kurils in Russia.
