= Rhodopirellula bahusiensis =

Scientific classification
- Domain: Bacteria
- Kingdom: Pseudomonadati
- Phylum: Planctomycetota
- Class: Planctomycetia
- Order: Pirellulales
- Family: Pirellulaceae
- Genus: Rhodopirellula
- Species: R. bahusiensis

Binomial name
- Rhodopirellula bahusiensis Frank 2011

Type strain
- DSM 24079, JCM 17623, strain SWK21

Species of bacterium

Rhodopirellula bahusiensis is a bacterium from the genus Rhodopirellula.
