= Rubripirellula =

Scientific classification
- Domain: Bacteria
- Kingdom: Pseudomonadati
- Phylum: Planctomycetota
- Class: Planctomycetia
- Order: Pirellulales
- Family: Pirellulaceae
- Genus: Rubripirellula; Bondoso et al. 2016

Type species
- Rubripirellula obstinata Bondoso et al. 2016

Species
- R. amarantea; R. lacrimiformis; R. obstinata; R. reticaptiva; R. tenax

Genus of bacteria

Rubripirellula is a genus of bacteria from the family of Planctomycetaceae with five known species. Rubripirellula obstinata has been isolated from the alga Laminaria from the northern coast from Porto in Portugal.

== Phylogeny ==
The currently accepted taxonomy is based on the List of Prokaryotic names with Standing in Nomenclature (LPSN) and National Center for Biotechnology Information (NCBI).

16S rRNA based LTP_10_2024

- Rubripirellula
  - - R. amarantea Kallscheuer et al. 2021
    - R. obstinata Bondoso et al. 2016
  - - R. lacrimiformis Wiegand et al. 2021
    - - R. reticaptiva Kallscheuer et al. 2021
      - R. tenax Kallscheuer et al. 2021

120 marker proteins based GTDB 10-RS226

- Rubripirellula
  - - R. amarantea
    - R. obstinata
  - - R. lacrimiformis
    - - R. reticaptiva
      - R. tenax

== See also ==
- List of bacterial orders
- List of bacteria genera
