= Rhodopirellula lusitana =

Scientific classification
- Domain: Bacteria
- Kingdom: Pseudomonadati
- Phylum: Planctomycetota
- Class: Planctomycetia
- Order: Pirellulales
- Family: Pirellulaceae
- Genus: Rhodopirellula
- Species: R. lusitana

Binomial name
- Rhodopirellula lusitana Bondoso et al. 2014

Type strain
- DSM 25457, LMG 27777, UC17

Species of bacterium

Rhodopirellula lusitana is a bacterium from the genus Rhodopirellula which has been isolated from Ulva from Carreço in Portugal.
