= Blastopirellula marina =

Scientific classification
- Domain: Bacteria
- Kingdom: Pseudomonadati
- Phylum: Planctomycetota
- Class: Planctomycetia
- Order: Planctomycetales
- Family: Planctomycetaceae
- Genus: Blastopirellula
- Species: B. marina

Binomial name
- Blastopirellula marina (Schlesner and Hirsch 1987) Schlesner et al. 2004 emend. Hahnke et al. 2016

Species of bacterium

Blastopirellula marina, a member of the phylum Planctomycetota, is a halotolerant bacterium inhabiting aquatic environments. B. marina was determined to be a new species by utilizing 16s rRNA sequence analysis.

== Morphology ==
This peptidoglycan-less bacterium reproduces via budding, which forms at the proximal cell pole. The internal membrane is compartmentalized into three parts: central pirellulosome, riboplasm, and paryphoplasm. The cells are pear-shaped and are either single or multiple form a flower pattern. The mature cells are inactive. Dr. Schlesner observed that the "colonies are greyish to brownish white."

== Metabolism ==
Blastopirellula marina influences carbon cycling in the environment. Dr. Schlesner discovered that "it's strictly aerobic and glucose is not metabolized anaerobically either by fermentation or with nitrogen as the electron acceptor." Carbon sources can be fructose, glycerol, glutamic acid, pyruvate glucuronic acid, lyxose, and chondroitin sulfate. It produces H_{2}S from thiosulfate but does not produce acetoin or indole. It’s catalase and cytochrome oxidase positive with no urease activity but has lipase activity.

== Distribution ==
Blastopirellula marina was first isolated from brackish water of the Baltic Sea by Dr. Schlesner. It resides in eutrophic, salty, aquatic environments.

== Media ==
Blastopirellula narina grows on M-14 medium at 30° celsius. It requires NaCl for growth and is unable to grow on freshwater medium. B. marina can tolerate high salinity, ranging from 0.4%-6.0%. It’s also able to grow without the assistance of vitamins in the media.

== Ecology ==
It is a BSL-1 thus it’s not known to cause disease in healthy adults or threaten the surrounding environment. It’s "resistant to ampicillin, penicillin, cephalothin, streptomycin, and cycloserine, but not tetracycline."

== Genome ==
Six strains have been sequenced: DSM 3645, HEX-2 MGV, NAP PRIS-MGV, Nap-Phe MGV, Hex-1 MGV and HEX PRIS-MGV. Through analysis of these sequenced strains, "the median length is 7.3879 Mb, median protein count is 5890 and the median GC% is 57." It contains genes for lactic acid fermentation but that function has not been discovered yet.
