= Singulisphaera acidiphila =

Scientific classification
- Domain: Bacteria
- Kingdom: Pseudomonadati
- Phylum: Planctomycetota
- Class: Planctomycetia
- Order: Isosphaerales
- Family: Isosphaeraceae
- Genus: Singulisphaera
- Species: S. acidiphila

Binomial name
- Singulisphaera acidiphila Kulichevskaya et al. 2008

Type strain
- ATCC BAA-1392, DSM 18658, MOB10, VKM B-2454

Species of bacterium

Singulisphaera acidiphila is an aerobic and non-motile bacterium from the genus Singulisphaera which has been isolated from Sphagnum peat from the Yaroslavl Region in Russia.
