= Singulisphaera mucilagenosa =

Scientific classification
- Domain: Bacteria
- Kingdom: Pseudomonadati
- Phylum: Planctomycetota
- Class: Planctomycetia
- Order: Isosphaerales
- Family: Isosphaeraceae
- Genus: Singulisphaera
- Species: S. mucilagenosa

Binomial name
- Singulisphaera mucilagenosa Zaicnikova et al. 2011

Type strain
- Z-0071

Synonyms
- Singulispaera mucilaginosa

Species of bacterium

Singulisphaera mucilagenosa is an acid-tolerant bacterium from the genus of Singulisphaera which has been isolated from dystrophic humified water.
