= Lacipirellulaceae =

Scientific classification
- Domain: Bacteria
- Kingdom: Pseudomonadati
- Phylum: Planctomycetota
- Class: Planctomycetia
- Order: Pirellulales
- Family: Lacipirellulaceae; Dedysh et al., 2020

Genera
- Adhaeretor; Aeoliella; Botrimarina; Bythopirellula; Lacipirellula; Pirellulimonas; Posidoniimonas; Pseudobythopirellula

Family of bacteria

Lacipirellulaceae is a family of bacteria.

== Phylogeny ==
The currently accepted taxonomy is based on the List of Prokaryotic names with Standing in Nomenclature (LPSN) and National Center for Biotechnology Information (NCBI).

16S rRNA based LTP_10_2024

- - Lacipirellula Dedysh et al. 2020
  - - Pirellulimonas Wiegand et al. 2021
    - - - Pseudobythopirellula Wiegand et al. 2021
        - - Adhaeretor Wiegand et al. 2022
          - Bythopirellula Storesund and Øvreås 2021
      - - Botrimarina Wiegand et al. 2021
        - - Aeoliella Wiegand et al. 2021
          - Posidoniimonas Kohn et al. 2020

120 marker proteins based GTDB 10-RS226

- - - Bythopirellula
    - - Adhaeretor
      - Lacipirellula
  - - Aeoliella
    - - Pirellulimonas
      - - Posidoniimonas
        - - Pseudobythopirellula
          - Botrimarina

== See also ==
- List of bacterial orders
- List of bacteria genera
