= Telmatocola =

Scientific classification
- Domain: Bacteria
- Kingdom: Pseudomonadati
- Phylum: Planctomycetota
- Class: Planctomycetia
- Order: Gemmatales
- Family: Gemmataceae
- Genus: Telmatocola; Kulichevskaya et al. 2012

Type species
- Telmatocola sphagniphila Kulichevskaya et al. 2012

Species
- T. sphagniphila

Genus of bacteria

Telmatocola is a genus of bacteria from the family of Planctomycetaceae with one known species (Telmatocola sphagniphila). Telmatocola sphagniphila has been isolate from Sphagnum peat from Staroselsky moss from the Tver Region.

== See also ==
- List of bacterial orders
- List of bacteria genera
