= Singulisphaera rosea =

Scientific classification
- Domain: Bacteria
- Kingdom: Pseudomonadati
- Phylum: Planctomycetota
- Class: Planctomycetia
- Order: Isosphaerales
- Family: Isosphaeraceae
- Genus: Singulisphaera
- Species: S. rosea

Binomial name
- Singulisphaera rosea Kulichevskaya et al. 2012

Type strain
- DSM 23044, S26, VKM B-2599

Species of bacterium

Singulisphaera rosea is a moderately acidophilic, mesophilic, aerobic and non-motile bacterium from the genus Singulisphaera which has been isolated from Sphagnum peat from the Tver Region in Russia.
