= Adhaeretor =

Scientific classification
- Domain: Bacteria
- Kingdom: Pseudomonadati
- Phylum: Planctomycetota
- Class: Planctomycetia
- Order: Pirellulales
- Family: Lacipirellulaceae
- Genus: Adhaeretor; Wiegand et al. 2022

Type species
- Adhaeretor mobilis Wiegand et al. 2022

Species
- A. mobilis

Genus of bacteria

Adhaeretor is a genus of bacteria from the family of Lacipirellulaceae with one known species, Adhaeretor mobilis.

== See also ==
- List of bacterial orders
- List of bacteria genera
