= Planctopirus hydrillae =

Scientific classification
- Domain: Bacteria
- Kingdom: Pseudomonadati
- Phylum: Planctomycetota
- Class: Planctomycetia
- Order: Planctomycetales
- Family: Planctomycetaceae
- Genus: Planctopirus
- Species: P. hydrillae

Binomial name
- Planctopirus hydrillae Yadav et al. 2018

Type strain
- KCTC 42880, LMG 29153, JC280

Species of bacterium

Planctopirus hydrillae is a Gram-negative bacterium from the genus of Planctopirus which has been isolated from the plant Hydrilla verticillata from Hyderabad in India.
