= Zavarzinella =

Scientific classification
- Domain: Bacteria
- Kingdom: Pseudomonadati
- Phylum: Planctomycetota
- Class: Planctomycetia
- Order: Gemmatales
- Family: Gemmataceae
- Genus: Zavarzinella; Kulichevskaya et al. 2009

Type species
- Zavarzinella formosa Kulichevskaya et al. 2009

Species
- Z. formosa

Genus of bacteria

Zavarzinella is an aerobic genus of bacteria from the family of Planctomycetaceae with one known species (Zavarzinella formosa). Zavarzinella formosa has been isolated from Sphagnum peat from West Siberia.
