= Blastopirellula cremea =

Scientific classification
- Domain: Bacteria
- Kingdom: Pseudomonadati
- Phylum: Planctomycetota
- Class: Planctomycetia
- Order: Planctomycetales
- Family: Planctomycetaceae
- Genus: Blastopirellula
- Species: B. cremea

Binomial name
- Blastopirellula cremea Lee et al. 2013

Type strain
- JCM 17758, KACC 15559, strain LHWP2

Species of bacterium

Blastopirellula cremea is an aerobic and motile bacterium from the genus of Blastopirellula which has been isolated from a dead ark clam (Scapharca broughtonii) from Korea.
