= Singulisphaera =

Scientific classification
- Domain: Bacteria
- Kingdom: Pseudomonadati
- Phylum: Planctomycetota
- Class: Planctomycetia
- Order: Isosphaerales
- Family: Isosphaeraceae
- Genus: Singulisphaera; Kulichevskaya et al. 2008

Type species
- Singulisphaera acidiphila Kulichevskaya et al. 2008

Species
- S. acidiphila; "S. mucilagenosa"; S. rosea

Genus of bacteria

Singulisphaera is a moderately acidophilic and mesophilic genus of bacteria from the family Isosphaeraceae.

== Phylogeny ==
The currently accepted taxonomy is based on the List of Prokaryotic names with Standing in Nomenclature (LPSN) and National Center for Biotechnology Information (NCBI).

16S rRNA based LTP_10_2024

- Singulisphaera
  - S. acidiphila Kulichevskaya et al. 2008
  - S. rosea Kulichevskaya et al. 2012

120 marker proteins based GTDB 10-RS226

- Singulisphaera
  - S. acidiphila Kulichevskaya et al. 2008

== See also ==
- List of bacterial orders
- List of bacteria genera
