= Tepidisphaera =

Scientific classification
- Domain: Bacteria
- Kingdom: Pseudomonadati
- Phylum: Planctomycetota
- Class: Phycisphaerae
- Order: Tepidisphaerales
- Family: Tepidisphaeraceae
- Genus: Tepidisphaera; Kovaleva et al. 2015

Type species
- Tepidisphaera mucosa Kovaleva et al. 2015

Species
- T. mucosa

Genus of bacteria

Tepidisphaera is a genus of bacteria from the family of Planctomycetaceae with one known species (Tepidisphaera mucosa). Tepidisphaera mucosa has been isolated from a hot spring from the Lake Baikal in Kamchatka in Russia.

== Species ==
- List of bacterial orders
- List of bacteria genera
