= Paludisphaera =

Scientific classification
- Domain: Bacteria
- Kingdom: Pseudomonadati
- Phylum: Planctomycetota
- Class: Planctomycetia
- Order: Isosphaerales
- Family: Isosphaeraceae
- Genus: Paludisphaera; Kulichevskaya et al. 2016

Type species
- Paludisphaera borealis Kulichevskaya et al. 2015

Species
- P. borealis; P. mucosa; P. rhizosphaerae; P. soli

Genus of bacteria

Paludisphaera is an aerobic genus of bacteria from the family of Isosphaeraceae with four known species (Paludisphaera borealis). Paludisphaera borealishas been isolated from Sphagnum peat from the Yaroslavl region in Russia.

== Phylogeny ==
The currently accepted taxonomy is based on the List of Prokaryotic names with Standing in Nomenclature (LPSN) and National Center for Biotechnology Information (NCBI).

16S rRNA based LTP_10_2024

- Paludisphaera
  - P. borealis
  - - P. rhizosphaerae
    - P. soli

120 marker proteins based GTDB 10-RS226

- Paludisphaera
  - P. borealis Kulichevskaya et al. 2015
  - - P. soli Kasuhik et al. 2023
    - - P. mucosa Ivanova et al. 2024
      - P. rhizosphaerae Lhingjakim et al. 2023

== See also ==
- List of bacterial orders
- List of bacteria genera
