= Gimesia =

Scientific classification
- Domain: Bacteria
- Kingdom: Pseudomonadati
- Phylum: Planctomycetota
- Class: Planctomycetia
- Order: Planctomycetales
- Family: Planctomycetaceae
- Genus: Gimesia; Scheuner et al. 2015

Type species
- Gimesia maris (Bauld & Staley 1980) Scheuner et al. 2015

Species
- G. alba; G. algae; G. aquarii; "G. aquatilis"; G. benthica; G. chilikensis; G. fumaroli; G. maris; G. panareensis

Genus of bacteria

Gimesia is a genus of bacteria from the family of Planctomycetaceae with nine known species. Gimesia maris has been isolated from neritic water from Puget Sound in the United States.

== Phylogeny ==
The currently accepted taxonomy is based on the List of Prokaryotic names with Standing in Nomenclature (LPSN) and National Center for Biotechnology Information (NCBI).

16S rRNA based LTP_10_2024

- Gimesia
  - - G. panareensis
    - - G. benthica
      - G. chilikensis
  - - G. fumaroli
    - - - G. alba
        - G. aquarii
      - - G. algae
        - G. maris

120 marker proteins based GTDB 10-RS226

- Gimesia
  - - G. panareensis Wiegand et al. 2021
    - - G. benthica Wang et al. 2020
      - G. chilikensis Kumar et al. 2020
  - - - G. algae Wiegand et al. 2021
      - G. maris (Bauld & Staley 1980) Scheuner et al. 2015
    - - G. aquarii Wiegand et al. 2021
      - - G. alba Wiegand et al. 2021
        - G. fumaroli Wiegand et al. 2021

== See also ==
- List of bacterial orders
- List of bacteria genera
