= Schlesneria =

Scientific classification
- Domain: Bacteria
- Kingdom: Pseudomonadati
- Phylum: Planctomycetota
- Class: Planctomycetia
- Order: Planctomycetales
- Family: Planctomycetaceae
- Genus: Schlesneria; Kulichevskaya et al. 2007

Type species
- Schlesneria paludicola Kulichevskaya et al. 2007

Species
- S. paludicola; S. sphaerica

Genus of bacteria

Schlesneria is a genus of bacteria from the family of Planctomycetaceae with one known species (Schlesneria paludicola). Schlesneria paludicola has been isolated from sphagnum peat from Bakchar in Russia.
