= Aquisphaera =

Scientific classification
- Domain: Bacteria
- Kingdom: Pseudomonadati
- Phylum: Planctomycetota
- Class: Planctomycetia
- Order: Isosphaerales
- Family: Isosphaeraceae
- Genus: Aquisphaera; Bondoso et al. 2011

Type species
- Aquisphaera giovannonii Bondoso et al. 2011

Species
- A. giovannonii; A. insulae

Genus of bacteria

Aquisphaera is a chemoheterotrophic genus of bacteria from the family of Isosphaeraceae with one known species (Aquisphaera giovannonii). Aquisphaera giovannonii has been isolated from sediments from a freshwater aquarium from Porto in Portugal.

== See also ==
- List of bacterial orders
- List of bacteria genera
