= Planctomicrobium =

Scientific classification
- Domain: Bacteria
- Kingdom: Pseudomonadati
- Phylum: Planctomycetota
- Class: Planctomycetia
- Order: Planctomycetales
- Family: Planctomycetaceae
- Genus: Planctomicrobium; Kulichevskaya et al. 2015

Type species
- Planctomicrobium piriforme Kulichevskaya et al. 2015

Species
- P. piriforme

Genus of bacteria

Planctomicrobium is an aerobic genus of bacteria from the family of Planctomycetaceae with one known species (Planctomicrobium piriforme). Planctomicrobium piriforme has been isolated from littoral wetland from the Valaam Island in Russia.

Planctomicrobium piriforme is aerobic.

== See also ==
- List of bacterial orders
- List of bacteria genera
