= Rubinisphaera =

Scientific classification
- Domain: Bacteria
- Kingdom: Pseudomonadati
- Phylum: Planctomycetota
- Class: Planctomycetia
- Order: Planctomycetales
- Family: Planctomycetaceae
- Genus: Rubinisphaera; Scheuner et al. 2015

Type species
- Rubinisphaera brasiliensis (Schlesner 1990) Scheuner et al. 2015

Species
- R. brasiliensis; R. italica; R. margarita

Genus of bacteria

Rubinisphaera is a genus of bacteria from the family of Planctomycetaceae with two known species. Rubinisphaera brasiliensis has been isolated from water from the Lagoa Vermelha from Brazil.

== Phylogeny ==
The currently accepted taxonomy is based on the List of Prokaryotic names with Standing in Nomenclature (LPSN) and National Center for Biotechnology Information (NCBI).

16S rRNA based LTP_10_2024

- Rubinisphaera
  - R. brasiliensis
  - - R. italica
    - R. margarita

120 marker proteins based GTDB 10-RS226

- Rubinisphaera
  - R. brasiliensis (Schlesner 1990) Scheuner et al. 2015
  - - R. italica Kallscheuer et al. 2021
    - R. margarita Vitorino et al. 2022

== See also ==
- List of bacterial orders
- List of bacteria genera
