= Planctopirus =

Scientific classification
- Domain: Bacteria
- Kingdom: Pseudomonadati
- Phylum: Planctomycetota
- Class: Planctomycetia
- Order: Planctomycetales
- Family: Planctomycetaceae
- Genus: Planctopirus; Scheuner et al. 2015

Type species
- Planctopirus limnophila (Hirsch & Muller 1986) Scheuner et al. 2015

Species
- P. ephydatiae; P. hydrillae; P. limnophila

Genus of bacteria

Planctopirus is a genus of bacteria from the family of Planctomycetaceae

== Phylogeny ==
The currently accepted taxonomy is based on the List of Prokaryotic names with Standing in Nomenclature (LPSN) and National Center for Biotechnology Information (NCBI).

16S rRNA based LTP_10_2024

- Planctopirus
  - P. hydrillae
  - P. limnophila

120 marker proteins based GTDB 10-RS226

- Planctopirus
  - P. ephydatiae Kohn et al. 2020
  - - P. hydrillae Yadav et al. 2018
    - P. limnophila (Hirsch & Muller 1986) Scheuner et al. 2015

== See also ==
- List of bacterial orders
- List of bacteria genera
