= Christensenella minuta =

Scientific classification
- Domain: Bacteria
- Kingdom: Bacillati
- Phylum: Bacillota
- Class: Clostridia
- Order: Eubacteriales
- Family: Christensenellaceae
- Genus: Christensenella
- Species: C. minuta

Binomial name
- Christensenella minuta Morotomi et al. 2012

Species of bacterium

Christensenella minuta is an anaerobic, Gram-negative bacteria discovered in human fecal matter in Tokyo, Japan.

== Discovery ==
Christenesella minuta was first discussed in 2012 by Masami Morotomi and his research team from the Yakult Central Institute for Microbiological Research in Tokyo, Japan, following its isolation from human feces. Fecal samples were collected, transferred to anaerobic conditions, and diluted. The diluted solution was then plated with phosphate-buffered saline (PBS), a salt solution used to maintain osmotic balance and wash cells. It was then placed onto a Gifu Anaerobic Medium (GAM) agar plate with either bile or antibiotics present, in order to isolate the dominant anaerobic colonies in the sample. Following a 3-day period at 37 °C, morphologically distinct colonies were plated onto more GAM agar plates, creating pure cultures of the bacteria. Particularly, the YIT 12065T strain of Christensenella minuta was isolated and grown at a pH of 6.8 with 80% bile equivalent, at a serial dilution of 10^{-6} relative to the original fecal sample from patient H (age 57). Further analysis of the bacteria demonstrates circular, beige colonies of roughly 0.1 mm following a 4-day incubation period. Under the microscope, cells are determined to be small (0.4-1.9 micrometers) bacilli (rod-shaped) with tapered ends. Cells appear either singularly or in pairs. They are non-motile and do not form spores.

== Classification ==
=== Taxonomy ===
Based on phylogenetic and physiological data, Christensenella minuta was first described with YIT 12065T, which was designated as the reference strain of the newly described taxon. The novel genus Christensenella was established as the reference for the newly proposed Christensenellaceae family, under the Firmicutes (also referred to as Bacillota) phylum. Taxonomically, the organism is classified under the Bacteria domain, the Firmicutes (Bacillota) phylum, the Clostridia class, the Clostridiales (also known as the Eubacteriales) order, the Christensencellaceae family, the Christensenella genus, and the Christensenella minuta species.

=== Close Relatives ===
Christensenella minuta holds a deep phylogenetic niche within the order of Clostridiales. It was the founding organism of a relatively novel family, Christensenellaceae, which consists of known sister organisms including C. hongkongensis, C. Acetigenes, C. faecalis, C. tenuis, and more. Following 16S ribosomal RNA gene sequencing, C. minuta demonstrated a notably high similarity with organisms Christensenella hongkongensis at 83.48% nucleotide similarity and Caldicoprobacter oshimai at 86.9% similarity. Based on 16S rRNA gene sequencing, Christensenella intestinihominis is the closest known species at 98.68% similarity.

== Metabolism ==
Christensenella minuta is an obligate anaerobe that primarily ferments glucose, producing short-chain fatty acid like acetic and butyric acids as its major metabolites. Consistent with this fermentative process, it has been reported to increase the amount of these compounds within the intestine. It has also been shown to metabolize other compounds and sugars, including salicin, L-arabinose, and L-rhamnose. Active metabolic enzymes present in C. minuta include β-galactosidase and β-glucosidase, demonstrating the cell's ability to metabolize ß-galactose and glycosides like cellulose.

Research on Christensenella minuta in rats has shown that the bacteria can inhibit lipogenesis, or the synthesis of lipids. After introducing the bacteria to the rats, liver biopsies revealed lower hepatic lipid levels. Further study also indicates the repression of a gene coding for an enzyme called glucokinase (Gck). This gene is used in the process of glycolysis, another mechanism of energy storage within the liver, and is therefore hypothesized to also be involved in the regulation of lipogenesis.

== Genomics ==
The draft genome sequence of Christensenella minuta strain DSM 22607 has revealed, upon sequencing, genomic features that distinguish it from other gut microbiota. The genome displays an unusual expansion of genes predicted to encode transport proteins, particularly those related to ATP-binding cassette (ABC) systems involved in carbohydrate uptake. Multiple homologues of the system's components RbsA, RbsB, and RbsC are present in significantly higher numbers than typically observed in related taxa. Comparative genomic analysis further supports that C. minuta is a genetically distinct organism within the order Clostridiales. Additionally, certain strains of the species have been shown to contain a single circular chromosome of about 2.77 million base pairs with 51.9% GC-content. These genes encode roughly 2,539 predicted coding sequences, including 6 rRNA genes and 51 tRNA genes.

== Ecology ==
Christensenella minuta is primarily found in the proximal colon, where it interacts with various gut bacteria both positively and negatively. It enhances the family Lactobacillaceae of bacteria, as well as the specific species Faecalibacterium prausnitzii, as a result of its synthesis of different amino acids (e.g., branched amino acid like valine, and amino acids like arginine) and short-chain fatty acids. These compounds then provide nutrients to the aforementioned bacteria in a process called cross-feeding.

C. minuta can also negatively affect multiple pathogenic bacteria, including Klebsiella pneumoniae and Streptococcus pasteurianus, the latter being theorized to be affected by C. minuta's production of short-chain fatty acids. S. Pasteurianus is seen to be increased in individuals with Crohn's disease, with fewer bacteria grown with short-chain fatty acids present.

The decrease of other notable bacteria, such as Clostridium innocuum, may indicate another mechanism for C. minuta to negatively regulate pathogenic bacteria. C. minuta's ability to lower lipid levels in the host is suggested to inhibit Clostridium innocuum, which survives better in lipid-rich environments.

Despite its resulting negative effects on gut diversity, a study on the gut microbiome of mice introduced to C. minuta through a fecal transplant determines the organism to be critical within the gut. In the study, mice with living C. minuta had a 10% increase in gut biomass in contrast to mice with colonies that contained killed C. minuta, according to a real-time polymerase chain reaction (qPCR) performed with 16S rRNA primers. Furthermore, mice with live colonies experienced greater energy loss within their stool. With its larger impact on biomass, metabolic output, and energetics, C. minuta in the gut can be understood as a keystone species.

== Applications ==
Christensenella minuta is being studied for potential applications in metabolic health, but the current evidence is largely associative and preclinical, rather than definitive in humans. Studies found that individuals with lower body mass index (BMI) tend to see a larger presence of C. minuta. This suggests a link between C. minuta and a lean metabolic phenotype, though this does not establish causation. Animal studies provide possible mechanisms: C. minuta appears to influence gut microbiota composition (e.g., balancing Firmicutes/Bacteroidetes ratios), makes short-chain fatty acids that regulate metabolism and appetite-related hormones, and modulate lipid metabolism by reducing hepatic fat accumulation and increasing thermogenesis. Additional findings suggest it may strengthen gut barrier integrity and change bile acid metabolism in ways that promote fatty acid oxidation. Together, these data support a possible role for C. minuta in metabolic regulation, but it requires further clinical validation.

Christensenella minuta has also been investigated in the context of inflammatory gut diseases such as inflammatory bowel disease (IBD), which causes barrier dysfunction and inflammation, but the evidence again combines human association studies with mechanistic work in experimental models. Clinical studies demonstrated a constant reduction of Christensenella minuta in those with Crohn's disease and ulcerative colitis, and a lower abundance of this bacterium has been associated with disease flares. Mechanistic studies in cell systems and mouse models show that C. minuta reduces inflammatory signaling by lowering cytokines such as IL-1α and MCP-1 and inhibiting pathways like NF-κB, which also helps preserve intestinal barrier function by maintaining mucus-producing cells, improving tight junction function, and preventing intestinal permeability. Some of these effects may be mediated by metabolites (short-chain fatty acids), which can impact immune system response and epithelial tissue repair. Based on these findings, C. minuta is being investigated as a candidate for a next-generation probiotic. The underlying method of this probiotic activity remains undetermined, since its mechanisms are not fully defined, and most supporting evidence comes from in vitro and animal studies rather than established clinical efficacy. However, there is potential for meaningful uses in human health and development into future treatments and therapeutics with further research.
