= Bythopirellula =

Scientific classification
- Domain: Bacteria
- Kingdom: Pseudomonadati
- Phylum: Planctomycetota
- Class: Planctomycetia
- Order: Planctomycetales
- Family: Planctomycetaceae
- Genus: Bythopirellula; Storesund & Øvreås 2021

Type species
- Bythopirellula goksoeyrii Storesund & Øvreås 2021

Species
- B. goksoyrii; B. polymerisocia

Synonyms
- "Bythopirellula" Storesund & Øvreås 2013

Genus of bacteria

Bythopirellula is a genus of bacteria from the family of Planctomycetaceae with two known species. Bythopirellula goksoyri has been isolated from deep sea iron hydroxide deposits from the Arctic Mid-Ocean Ridge.

== See also ==
- List of bacterial orders
- List of bacteria genera
