= Caldicoprobacter guelmensis =

Scientific classification
- Domain: Bacteria
- Kingdom: Bacillati
- Phylum: Bacillota
- Class: Clostridia
- Order: Eubacteriales
- Family: Caldicoprobacteraceae
- Genus: Caldicoprobacter
- Species: C. guelmensis

Binomial name
- Caldicoprobacter guelmensis Bouanane-Darenfed et al. 2013

Type strain
- D2C22, DSM 24605, JCM 17646

Synonyms
- Acetomicrobium guelmense

Species of bacterium

Caldicoprobacter guelmensis is a Gram-positive, thermophilic, non-spore-forming, anaerobic, xylanolytic and non-motile bacterium from the genus Caldicoprobacter which has been isolated from water from a hot spring from Guelma in Algeria.
