= Sedimentisphaeraceae =

Scientific classification
- Domain: Bacteria
- Kingdom: Pseudomonadati
- Phylum: Planctomycetota
- Class: Phycisphaerae
- Order: Sedimentisphaerales
- Family: Sedimentisphaeraceae; Spring et al. 2018

Genera
- Limihaloglobus; Sedimentisphaera

Family of bacteria

Sedimentisphaeraceae is a family of aquatic bacteria.

== Phylogeny ==
The currently accepted taxonomy is based on the List of Prokaryotic names with Standing in Nomenclature (LPSN) and National Center for Biotechnology Information (NCBI).

16S rRNA based LTP_10_2024

- Sedimentisphaeraceae
  - Limihaloglobus Pradel et al' 2020
  - Sedimentisphaera Spring et al. 2018

120 marker proteins based GTDB 10-RS226

- Sedimentisphaeraceae
  - Limihaloglobus
  - Sedimentisphaera
