= Thermoguttaceae =

Scientific classification
- Domain: Bacteria
- Kingdom: Pseudomonadati
- Phylum: Planctomycetota
- Class: Planctomycetia
- Order: Pirellulales
- Family: Thermoguttaceae; Dedysh et al. 2020

Genera
- "Ca. Luxemburgiella"; Thermogutta; Thermostilla

Family of bacteria

Thermoguttaceae is a family of bacteria.
