= Anaerohalosphaera =

Scientific classification
- Domain: Bacteria
- Kingdom: Pseudomonadati
- Phylum: Planctomycetota
- Class: Phycisphaerae
- Order: Sedimentisphaerales
- Family: Anaerohalosphaeraceae; Pradel et al. 2020
- Genus: Anaerohalosphaera; Pradel et al. 2020
- Species: A. lusitana

Binomial name
- Anaerohalosphaera lusitana Pradel et al. 2020

Genus of bacteria

Anaerohalosphaera is a genus of bacteria. The only species is Anaerohalosphaera lusitana.
