= Christensenella hongkongensis =

Scientific classification
- Domain: Bacteria
- Kingdom: Bacillati
- Phylum: Bacillota
- Class: Clostridia
- Order: Eubacteriales
- Family: Christensenellaceae
- Genus: Christensenella
- Species: C. hongkongensis

Binomial name
- Christensenella hongkongensis (Lau et al. 2014) Liu et al. 2021

Synonyms
- "Catabacter hongkongensis" Lau et al. 2007; Catabacter hongkongensis Lau et al. 2014

Species of bacterium

Christensenella hongkongensis is a species of clinically relevant gram-positive coccobacilli, first isolated from patients in Hong Kong and Canada in 2006. Although the species remains relatively rare, it has a high mortality rate of up to 50%. Christensenella is thought to be broadly distributed globally, as it has been isolated from patient blood cultures around the world including Hong Kong, South Korea, New Zealand, Canada, Sweden, France and Italy. Fewer than 15 cases of C. hongkongensis have been observed worldwide.

== Taxonomy ==
Christensenella hongkongensis is a species of bacteria belonging to the Christensenellaceae family within the Bacillota phylum. Bacillota includes a diverse group of Gram-positive bacteria. Within the class Clostridia, C. hongkongensis is further classified into the order Eubacteriales, distinguishing them from Bacilli by lacking aerobic respiration. Accordingly, C. hongkongensis is part of the Christensenella genus, a non-spore forming, anaerobic, and non-motile bacteria part of a new family Christensenellaceae, known for its effect in the gut by producing butyrate.

== Discovery ==
=== Etymology ===
The genus Christensenella was first discovered in 2012, when the species Christensenella minuta was isolated from human feces by Morotomi et al. The name Christensenella is an homage to Professor Henrik Christensen to honor his contributions to bacteriology. The species name hongkongensis comes from the region Hong Kong, as the bacterial species was initially identified in cultures obtained from patients in the region.

=== Isolation ===
The species was first discovered in 2007 when it was obtained from the blood cultures of four patients who lived in Hong Kong and Canada. The two patients from Hong Kong were men of ages 48 and 39. The 48-year-old man was diagnosed with intestinal occlusion and sepsis, while the 39-year-old man had appendicitis. Of the Canadian patients, one was a 74-year-old man suffering from sepsis in their hepatobiliary tract, and the other was a woman diagnosed with metastatic carcinoma and sepsis. Isolation was performed using the BACTEC 9240 blood culturing system, and traditional microbiological methods were used for identification of bacterial properties. The species has not been reported many times in literature since its isolation. There were a total of 11 times in which the species was identified, seven of which were patients from Hong Kong, and the remainder were from South Korea (one case), New Zealand (one case), and Canada (two cases).

=== Classification and reclassification ===
The classification of the species as "Catabacter hongkongensis" was initially based on its phenotype and the analysis of phylogenetic relationships based on the species' 16S rRNA sequence. In 2012, Morotomi et al. isolated a culture from a healthy adult's stool sample, and identified the Christensenella genus, through the discovery of Christensenella minuta. Since then, the Christensenella genus has expanded with four additional species being discovered. In 2021, a re-evaluation of the whole genome of "Catabacter hongkongensis" revealed higher similarity to the Christensenella genus due to the alignment of 135 shared protein sequences, and a 96-97% ID of the ribosomal between the two genus. These findings have led to "Catabacter hongkongensis" to be reclassified as Christensenella hongkongensis to maintain consistency in bacterial taxonomy.

== Neighboring species ==
Sequencing of the Christensenella hongkongensis 16S ribosomal RNA gene revealed phylogenetic relatives, sharing a 96-97% ID, with Christensenella minuta, Christensenella massiliensis, Christensenella intestinhominis, and Christensenella timonesis. The 16S rRNA gene sequences were retrieved from NCBI and aligned using MAFT. A phylogenetic tree was constructed using the maximum-likelihood method, where the close branches are listed below:

=== Christensenella minuta ===
Christensenella minuta is a commensal bacterium, characterized by properties that engage in mutualistic interactions with other microbes in the body, affecting gut health, metabolism, and body weight/BMI.

=== Christensenella massiliensis ===
Christensenella massiliensis is a mesophilic and commensal bacterium that thrives in the human body, inhabiting the gut.

=== Christensenella intestinhominis ===
Christensenella intestinhominis is a symbiotic and newly discovered bacterium residing in the human gut, with the unique ability to reduce cholesterol levels.

=== Christensenella timonesis ===
Christensenella timonesis is a recently identified bacterial species that was isolated from the human gut.

== Ecology ==
Christensenella hongkongensis resides in the human gut microbiome, fermenting organic compounds like sugar to produce by-products such as butyrate. In addition, the bacteria requires a suitable substrate or nutrient source for growth, developing best in the oxygen-deprived environment of the human colon, where it can ferment carbohydrates, serving as a source of energy and carbon for the bacterium.

== Metabolism ==
Christensenella hongkongensis is anaerobic, involving the fermentation of organic compounds; due to its shared relationship with Christensenella minuta, it is likely that it can utilize mannose, arabinose, glucose, rhamnose, salicin, and xylose to generate energy. Fermentation of these products also involves the partial oxidation of pyruvate to produce organic acids like butyrate.

== Comparative genomics ==
Following the reclassification of Catabacter hongkongensis to Christensenella hongkongensis, FastANI was utilized to conduct pairwise Average Nucleotide Identity (ANI) comparisons among the six genomes from both genera. Subsequently, the genetic similarities between the genomes were plotted and visualized using the visualization library ggplot 2 package in R. Subsequently, the genomes were further analyzed based on their genetic makeup in attempts of learning more about their metabolic pathways and genomic features. ABRicate, a software developed to screen microorganisms for antimicrobial resistance, was also utilized to identify specific genes that led to such resistance.

In the end, researchers learned that the six species of bacteria have genome sizes ranging from 2.5 to 3.3 MegaBase pairs and contain 48.52 to 52.07% of Guanine + Cytosine (GC) content. The ANI values of the Catabacteraceae and Christensenellaceae strains (HKU16T and ABBA15k) also revealed a 98.97% similarity between their genomes, ultimately indicating that the two strains belong to the same species. Similarly, the six genomes had ANI values ranging between 77.56% and 83.48%, expressing their nucleotide sequence similarities. Specifically, Christensenella intestinihominis (AF73-05CM02PP) and C. minuta (DSM 22607T) exhibited the highest ANI similarity value of 83.48% among different the species, suggesting that they have the closest genetic relationship despite being classified as distinct species.

Alone, the 2 strains of Christensenella hongkongensis that were referenced (HKU16T, ABBA 15k) have had their genomes analyzed and published. Hence, C. hongkongensis has been found to have an average GC content of 48.66% and an average genome size and protein count of 3000377 base pairs and 2848 proteins with a 123.5 contig count.

== Physiology ==
Christensenella hongkongensis is a strictly anaerobic bacterium that is also non-spore forming, and shapes resembled short rods. Gram-stains revealed variable staining that were dependent on the culture-age, but generally Gram-positive. The species was also confirmed to be motile, and expressed flagella as revealed by flagellar stains. C. hongkongensis was also identified to be catalase positive, and has a diverse metabolic profile being able to utilize carbohydrates such as arabinose, glucose, mannose, and xylose. The species expressed growth on sheep's blood agar and colony formation was observed following a 48-hour incubation at 37 °C. The bacterium did not express hemolytic activity, and also did not have the capability to produce indole or reduce nitrate. Available research and literature on the species did not reveal specific details regarding optimal growth conditions and generation times.

== Clinical features and diagnosis ==
Symptoms of C. hongkongensis infection include fever, vomiting, abdominal distension and constipation. The bacteria have been present in cases of bacteraemia. To accurately identify C. hongkongensis, 16S rRNA sequencing is recommended. Other identification methods such as MALDI-TOF, have not been able to identify the bacteria correctly.

== Treatment ==
Antibiotic treatment is usually administered upon C. hongkongensis infection. C. hongkongensis has been shown to be susceptible to antibiotics including kanamycin, vancomycin, cefuroxime, ciprofloxacin and metronidazole. In one case, the patient recovered without any antibiotic treatment.

== Significance ==
The prevalence of C. hongkongensis in literature arises from its association with severe infections, specifically gastrointestinal diseases. Several cases of the bacterium being present in patients suffering from conditions such as intestinal occlusion, acute intestinal infections, and sepsis. It is predicted to often exemplify the effects of these underlying conditions as well. The species was also identified in European water samples. This reveals the organism's presence in external environments, and suggests that a potential source of infection in the gastrointestinal tract is through the consumption of contaminated water or food. This highlights the need for improved sanitation and water quality management in regions where the bacterium may be present. The clinical outcomes from C. hongkongensis also raise concerns due to potential mortality rate, despite limited information on its epidemiology. All patients identified in literature with advanced malignancies had died, likely due to gastrointestinal translocation (passage of bacteria from the gastrointestinal tract to other parts of the body). The morbidity that is likely caused by C. hongkongensis is bacteremia and potential septic shock. Bacteremia refers to the presence of bacteria in the bloodstream of patients, and is often asymptomatic, but can lead to infections or sepsis, if not properly addressed.
