= Rhodopirellula =

Scientific classification
- Domain: Bacteria
- Kingdom: Pseudomonadati
- Phylum: Planctomycetota
- Class: Planctomycetia
- Order: Pirellulales
- Family: Pirellulaceae
- Genus: Rhodopirellula; Schlesner et al. 2004

Type species
- Rhodopirellula baltica Schlesner et al. 2004

Species
- See text

Synonyms
- Allorhodopirellula Sreya et al. 2023; Aporhodopirellula Sreya et al. 2023; Neorhodopirellula Sreya et al. 2023

Genus of bacteria

Rhodopirellula is a genus of marine bacteria from the family Pirellulaceae.

== Phylogeny ==
The currently accepted taxonomy is based on the List of Prokaryotic names with Standing in Nomenclature (LPSN) and National Center for Biotechnology Information (NCBI).

16S rRNA based LTP_10_2024

- Rhodopirellula
  - - R. baltica
    - - R. bahusiensis
      - R. europaea
  - - - R. lusitana
      - R. pilleata
    - - - R. heiligendammensis
        - R. solitaria
      - - R. aestuarii
        - R. rubra

120 marker proteins based GTDB 10-RS226

- Rhodopirellula
  - - "R. halodulae" Sreya et al. 2024
    - - "R. islandica" Kizina et al. 2015
      - - R. bahusiensis Frank 2023
        - - R. baltica Schlesner et al. 2004
          - R. europaea Frank 2023
  - - - R. lusitana Bondoso et al. 2014
      - R. pilleata Kallscheuer et al. 2021
    - - - R. heiligendammensis Kallscheuer et al. 2021
        - R. solitaria Kallscheuer et al. 2021
      - - R. aestuarii Rosado-Vitorino et al. 2023
        - - R. rubra Bondoso et al. 2014
          - "R. sallentina" Frank 2011

Species incertae sedis:

- "R. clava" Frank 2011
- "R. flandrensis" Frank 2011
- "R. gimesia" Frank 2011
- "R. magna" Frank 2011
- "R. philippinensis" Frank 2011
- "R. syltensis" Frank 2011

== See also ==
- List of bacterial orders
- List of bacteria genera
