= Caldicoprobacter algeriensis =

Scientific classification
- Domain: Bacteria
- Kingdom: Bacillati
- Phylum: Bacillota
- Class: Clostridia
- Order: Eubacteriales
- Family: Caldicoprobacteraceae
- Genus: Caldicoprobacter
- Species: C. algeriensis

Binomial name
- Caldicoprobacter algeriensis Bouanane-Darenfed et al. 2012

Type strain
- DSM 22661, JCM 16184, TH7C1

Species of bacterium

Caldicoprobacter algeriensis is a Gram-positive, thermophilic, anaerobic and non-motile bacterium from the genus Caldicoprobacter which has been isolated from a hot spring from Guelma in Algeria.
