= Phycisphaerae =

Scientific classification
- Domain: Bacteria
- Kingdom: Pseudomonadati
- Phylum: Planctomycetota
- Class: Phycisphaerae; Fukunaga et al. 2010

Orders
- Phycisphaerales; Sedimentisphaerales; Tepidisphaerales

Synonyms
- "Phycisphaeria" Oren, Parte & Garrity 2016

Class of bacteria

Phycisphaerae is a class of aquatic bacteria. They reproduce by budding and are found in samples of algae in marine water. Organisms in this group are spherical and have a holdfast, at the tip of a thin cylindrical extension from the cell body called the stalk, at the nonreproductive end that helps them to attach to each other during budding.

== Phylogeny ==
The currently accepted taxonomy is based on the List of Prokaryotic names with Standing in Nomenclature (LPSN) and National Center for Biotechnology Information (NCBI).

16S rRNA based LTP_10_2024

- - - Sedimentisphaerales
      - Anaerohalosphaeraceae
        Anaerohalosphaera
      - Sedimentisphaeraceae
        - Limihaloglobus
        - Sedimentisphaera
  - - Tepidisphaerales
      - Tepidisphaeraceae
        Tepidisphaera Kovaleva et al. 2015
    - Phycisphaerales
      - Phycisphaeraceae
        - Mucisphaera
        - - Poriferisphaera
          - - Algisphaera
            - Phycisphaera

120 marker proteins based GTDB 10-RS226

- - - Sedimentisphaerales
      - - Anaerohalosphaeraceae
          Anaerohalosphaera Pradel et al. 2020
        - "Anaerobacaceae"
          Anaerobaca Khomyakova, Merkel & Slobodkin 2024
      - - Sedimentisphaeraceae
          - Limihaloglobus Pradel et al. 2020
          - Sedimentisphaera Spring et al. 2018
  - - Tepidisphaerales
      - Tepidisphaeraceae
        "Humisphaera" Dedysh et al. 2021
    - Phycisphaerales
      - Phycisphaeraceae
        - - Algisphaera Yoon, Jang & Kasai 2014
          - Phycisphaera Fukunaga et al.2010
        - - Mucisphaera Kallscheuer et al. 2022
          - Poriferisphaera Kallscheuer et al. 2021

== See also ==
- List of bacteria genera
- List of bacterial orders
