= Gemmataceae =

Scientific classification
- Domain: Bacteria
- Kingdom: Pseudomonadati
- Phylum: Planctomycetota
- Class: Planctomycetia
- Order: Gemmatales; Dedysh et al. 2020
- Family: Gemmataceae; Kulichevskaya et al. 2017

Genera
- Fimbriiglobus; Frigoriglobus; Gemmata; Limnoglobus; Telmatocola; Thermogemmata; Tuwongella; Urbifossiella; Zavarzinella

Family of bacteria

Gemmataceae is a family of bacteria.

== Phylogeny ==
The currently accepted taxonomy is based on the List of Prokaryotic names with Standing in Nomenclature (LPSN) and National Center for Biotechnology Information (NCBI).

16S rRNA based LTP_10_2024

- - - Tuwongella Seeger et al. 2017
    - - Telmatocola Kulichevskaya et al. 2012
      - Zavarzinella Kulichevskaya et al. 2009
  - - - Fimbriiglobus Kulichevskaya et al. 2017
      - Limnoglobus Kulichevskaya et al. 2020
    - - Urbifossiella Kallscheuer et al. 2021
      - - Thermogemmata Elcheninov et al. 2021
        - - - Gemmata obscuriglobus Franzmann & Skerman 1985
            - Ramlibacter aquaticus Props et al. 2020
          - - Frigoriglobus Kulichevskaya et al. 2021
            - Gemmata species-group 2

120 marker proteins based GTDB 10-RS226

- - Tuwongella
  - - - Telmatocola
      - Zavarzinella
    - - - Fimbriiglobus
        - Limnoglobus
      - - Urbifossiella
        - - Thermogemmata
          - Gemmata (incl. Frigoriglobus)
