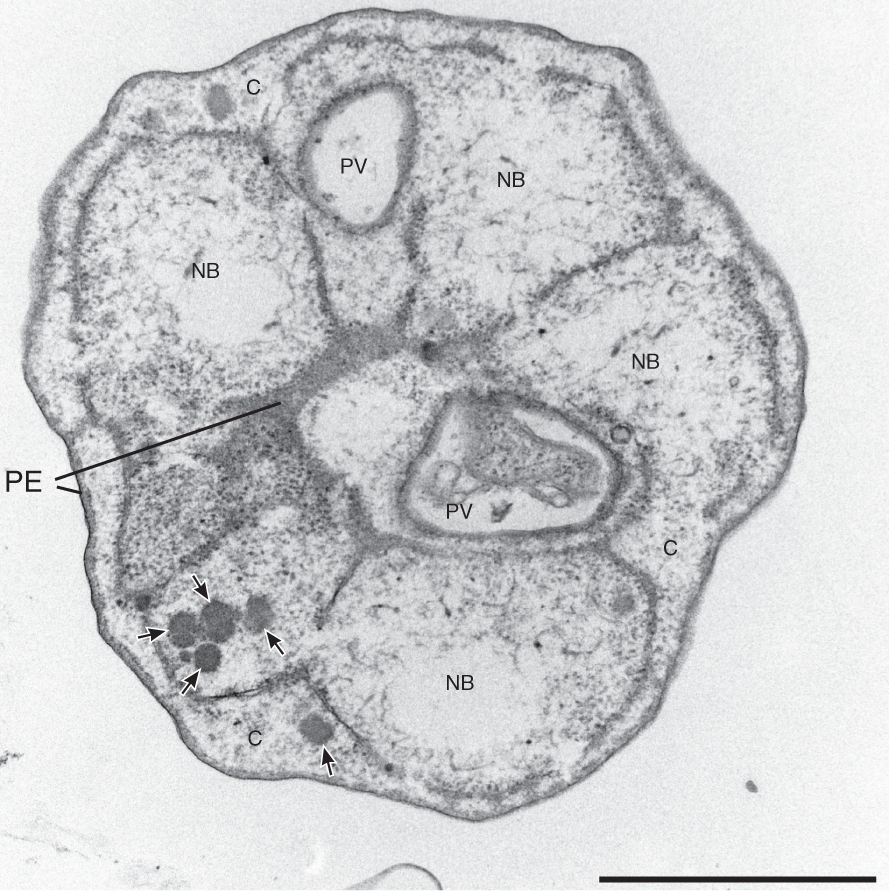
- Uabimicrobium amorphum

Scientific classification (Candidatus)
- Domain: Bacteria
- Kingdom: Pseudomonadati
- Phylum: Planctomycetota
- Class: "Ca. Uabimicrobiia"
- Order: "Ca. Uabimicrobiales"
- Family: "Ca. Uabimicrobiaceae"
- Genus: "Ca. Uabimicrobium" (Shiratori et al. 2019) Oren & Garrity 2021

Type species
- "Ca. Uabimicrobium amorphum" (Shiratori et al. 2019) Oren & Garrity 2021

Species
- "Ca. Uabimicrobium amorphum"; "Ca. Uabimicrobium helgolandensis"

= Uabimicrobium =

Genus of marine bacteria

Candidatus Uabimicrobium is a genus of free-living aquatic Gram-negative bacteria that are known to display cell eating (phagocytosis). As of 2026, there are only two species. The first species, Ca. Uabimicrobium amorphum was discovered from the Republic of Palau. Collected in 2015 and described in 2019, it became the first known bacteria that can eat other microbes through phagocytosis.

The second species, Ca Uabimicrobium helgolandensis was discovered from Helgoland Island, North Sea, in 2024. These two bacteria with their ability to engulf and ingest (endocytosis) whole bacteria are taken as evidence of primary symbiogenesis that led to the formation of eukaryotic cells.
