= Sedimentisphaerales =

Scientific classification
- Domain: Bacteria
- Kingdom: Pseudomonadati
- Phylum: Planctomycetota
- Class: Phycisphaerae
- Order: Sedimentisphaerales; Spring et al. 2018

Families
- "Anaerobacaceae"; Anaerohalosphaeraceae; Sedimentisphaeraceae

Order of bacteria

Sedimentisphaerales is an order of aquatic bacteria.

== See also ==
- List of bacteria genera
- List of bacterial orders
