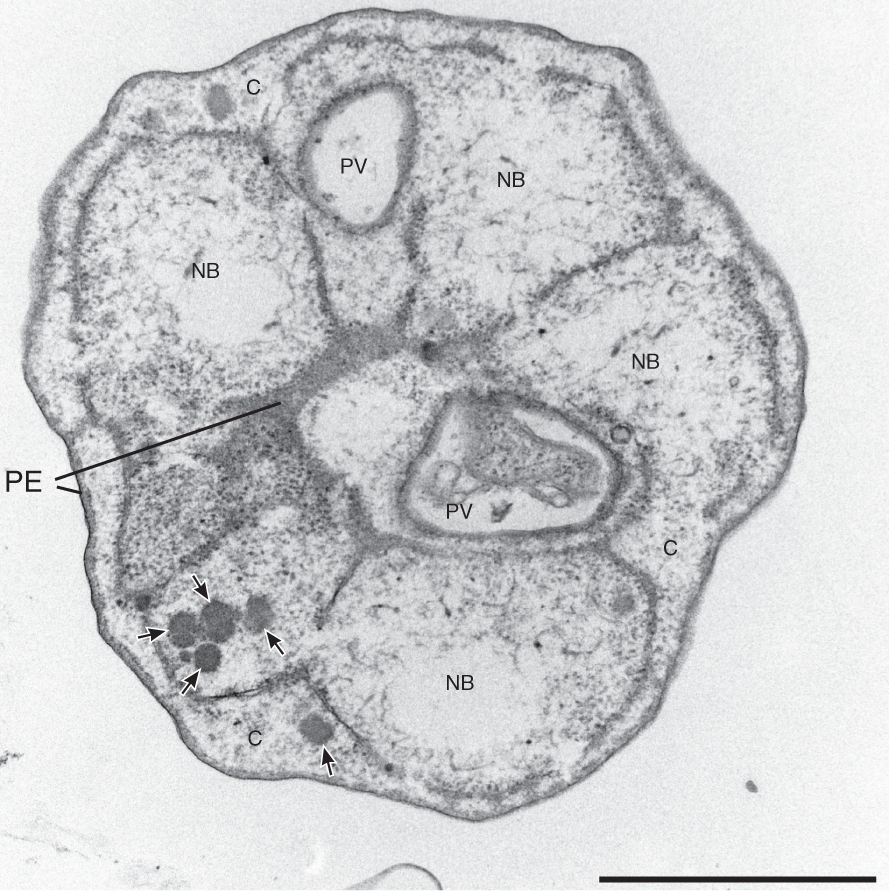
- Transmission electron micrograph of Ca. Uabimicrobium amorphum. Scale bar: 1 μm.: (C) cytoplasm; (CM) cytoplasmic membrane; (NB) nuclear body; (OM) outer membrane; (PE) periplasm; (PV) phagosome-like vacuole

Scientific classification (Candidatus)
- Domain: Bacteria
- Kingdom: Pseudomonadati
- Phylum: Planctomycetota
- Class: "Ca. Uabimicrobiia"
- Order: "Ca. Uabimicrobiales"
- Family: "Ca. Uabimicrobiaceae"
- Genus: "Ca. Uabimicrobium"
- Species: Ca. Uabimicrobium amorphum

Binomial name
- Candidatus Uabimicrobium amorphum (Shiratori et al. 2019) Oren & Garrity 2021

Synonyms
- Ca. Uab amorphum Shiratori et al. 2019

= Uabimicrobium amorphum =

Candidatus Uabimicrobium amorphum

Species of bacterium

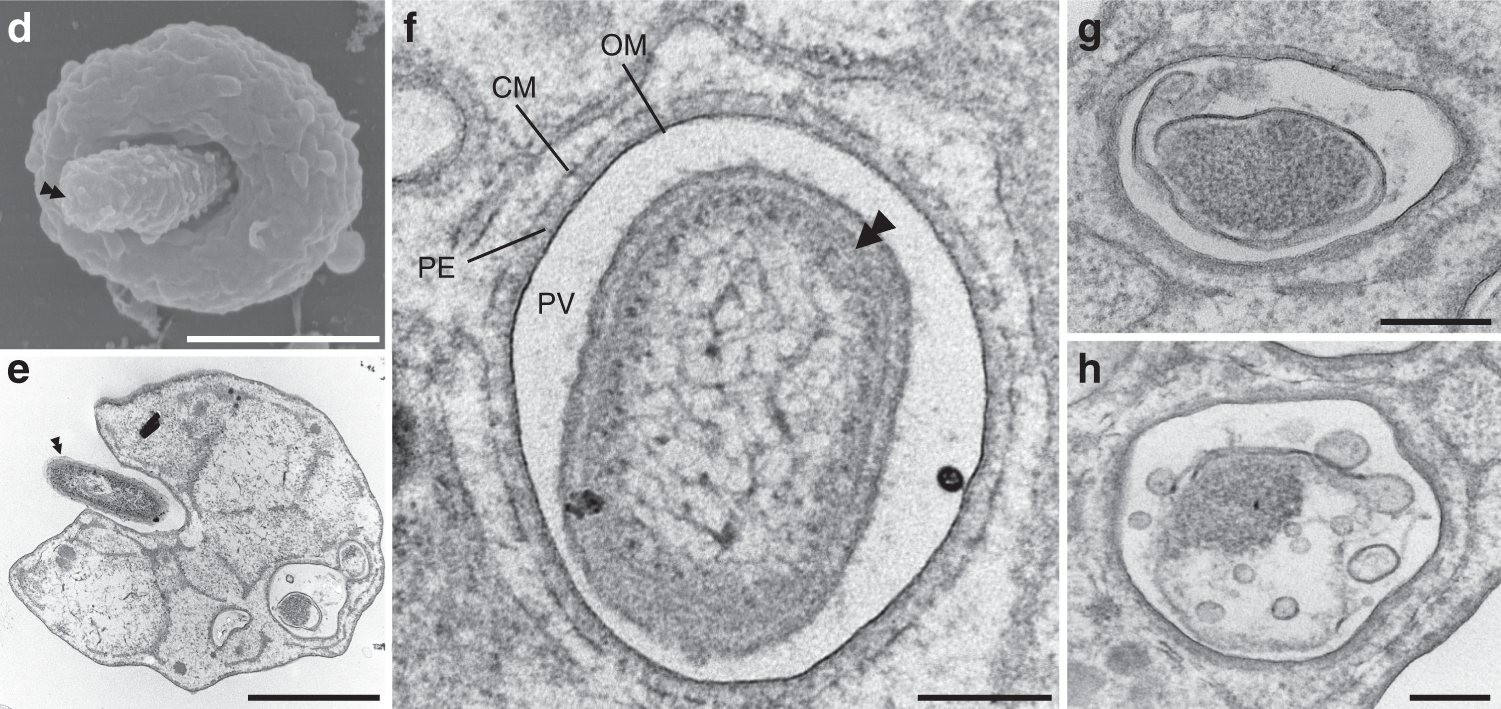
Ca. Uabimicrobium amorphum eating a bacterium (arrow heads)

Candidatus Uabimicrobium amorphum is a species of free-living aquatic Gram-negative bacteria discovered from the Republic of Palau. Collected in 2015 and described in 2019, it is the first known bacterium that can eat other microbes by the process called phagocytosis. Although there are several predatory bacteria that attack and kill other bacteria, this bacterium can engulf, ingest (the process called endocytosis) and digest whole bacteria. The ability to perform endocytosis in the bacterium gives the picture of primary symbiogenesis that led to the formation of eukaryotic cells.

== Discovery ==
While studying the microbial diversity of Pacific Ocean, a team of Japanese biologists led by Takashi Shiratori of the University of Tsukuba and Shigekatsu Suzuki of the National Institute for Environmental Studies in Tsukuba collected water samples around the island Republic of Palau on 27 October 2015. They found that the water samples contained several commonly found bacteria, but among them were some bacteria that appeared to eat other bacteria, a process most well understood in white blood cells during immune response. This was an unusual case because no bacteria were known to eat other cells, although some species could attack other bacteria and kill them.
