= Caldicoprobacter oshimai =

Scientific classification
- Domain: Bacteria
- Kingdom: Bacillati
- Phylum: Bacillota
- Class: Clostridia
- Order: Eubacteriales
- Family: Caldicoprobacteraceae
- Genus: Caldicoprobacter
- Species: C. oshimai

Binomial name
- Caldicoprobacter oshimai Yokoyama et al. 2010

Type strain
- ATCC BAA-1711, DSM 21659, JW/HY-331

Species of bacterium

Caldicoprobacter oshimai is a Gram-positive, extremely thermophilic, anaerobic, xylanolytic and non-motile bacterium from the genus Caldicoprobacter which has been isolated from faeces of sheep from the farm at the University of Georgia in the United States.
