= Phycisphaeraceae =

Scientific classification
- Domain: Bacteria
- Kingdom: Pseudomonadati
- Phylum: Planctomycetota
- Class: Phycisphaerae
- Order: Phycisphaerales; Fukunaga et al. 2010
- Family: Phycisphaeraceae; Fukunaga et al. 2010

Genera
- Algisphaera; Mucisphaera; Natronomicrosphaera; Phycisphaera; Poriferisphaera

Family of bacteria

Phycisphaeraceae is a family of bacteria.

== Phylogeny ==
The currently accepted taxonomy is based on the List of Prokaryotic names with Standing in Nomenclature (LPSN) and National Center for Biotechnology Information (NCBI).

16S rRNA based LTP_10_2024

- Phycisphaeraceae
  - Mucisphaera calidilacus
  - - Poriferisphaera corsica
    - - Algisphaera agarilytica
      - Phycisphaera mikurensis

120 marker proteins based GTDB 10-RS226

- Phycisphaeraceae
  - - Algisphaera agarilytica Yoon, Jang & Kasai 2014
    - Phycisphaera mikurensis Fukunaga et al.2010
  - - Mucisphaera calidilacus Kallscheuer et al. 2022
    - Poriferisphaera corsica Kallscheuer et al. 2021

Species incertae sedis:

- "Poriferisphaera hetertotrophicis" Zheng et al. 2023

== See also ==
- List of bacteria genera
- List of bacterial orders
