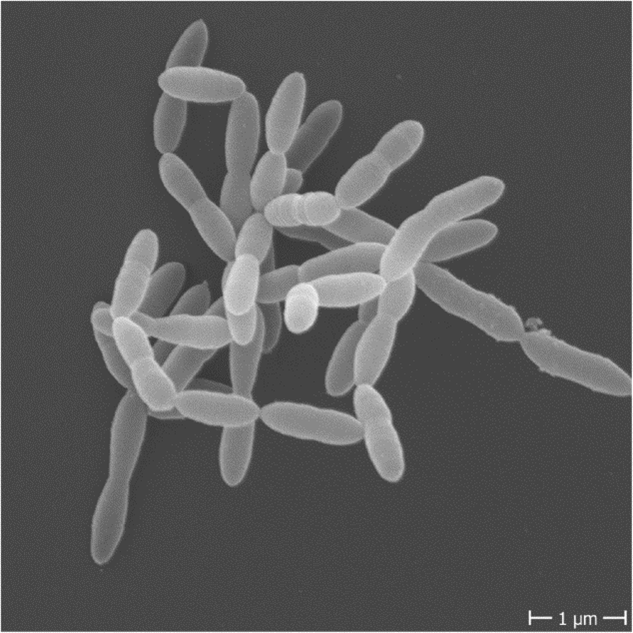
- Christensenella minuta

Scientific classification
- Domain: Bacteria
- Kingdom: Bacillati
- Phylum: Bacillota
- Class: Clostridia
- Order: Eubacteriales
- Family: Christensenellaceae
- Genus: Christensenella; Morotomi et al. 2012

Type species
- Christensenella minuta Morotomi et al. 2012

Species
- C. hongkongensis; C. intestinihominis; "C. massiliensi"; C. minuta; C. tenuis; "C. timonensis"

= Christensenella =

Genus of bacteria

Christensenella is a genus of non-spore-forming, anaerobic, and nonmotile bacteria from the family Christensenellaceae. They are also part of the order Clostridiales, the class Clostridia and the phylum Firmicutes. Phylogenetic analyzes of 16S rRNA gene sequences are used to describe this family. Due to the recent discovery of the Christensenellaceae family, it was not given importance until a few years ago. This is why very little is known about its ecology and how it may be associated with host factors and other microbiota. However, recent studies establish that members of this family, with exceptions, may be associated with a healthy phenotype for humans. The species C. minuta has been published and validated, and C. timonensis and C. massiliensis have been proposed as novel species of the genus Christensenella, all isolated from human feces.

== Characteristics (health-related group) ==
Some of the most relevant features are:

- It has been detected in the mucosa of the colon, ileum and appendix, and there is also evidence of colonization of the respiratory tract. It has a probable preference for the distal colon, which corresponds to its fermentative activities. In humans, this family corresponds to an average of 0.01% of the fecal microbiota.
- It has been associated with human longevity. We found a greater amount in centenarians compared to younger individuals.
- It is identified as one of the most heritable.
- Individuals with a normal body mass index (BMI) have a higher number of Christensenellaceae than obese individuals; if these are put on a diet, the Christensenellaceae increases after weight loss.
- Its proportion increases when triglyceride levels are low and high-density lipoprotein (HDL or "cholesterol" levels) are high.
- It has been associated with healthy glucose metabolism. It is also related to the consumption of dairy products and the fermentation of proteins and fibers. It has a greater abundance in omnivores compared to vegetarians, since it responds quickly to an increase in animal products in the diet.
- Individuals with Crohn's disease and ulcerative colitis depleted Christensenellaceae.

== Phylogeny ==
The currently accepted taxonomy is based on the List of Prokaryotic names with Standing in Nomenclature (LPSN) and National Center for Biotechnology Information (NCBI)

16S rRNA based LTP_10_2024

- Christensenella
  - C. hongkongensis
  - - C. tenuis
    - - C. intestinihominis
      - C. minuta

120 marker proteins based GTDB 09-RS220

- Christensenella
  - "C. timonensis" Ndongo et al. 2016
  - - C. hongkongensis (Lau et al. 2014) Liu et al. 2021
    - - "C. massiliensis" Ndongo et al. 2016
      - - C. tenuis Liu et al. 2022
        - - C. intestinihominis Zou et al. 2021
          - C. minuta Morotomi et al. 2012

== Christensenella minuta ==
C. minuta was the first species described in the new family Christensenellaceae in 2012 by Morotomi et al. According to research performed on healthy volunteers in 2014, the bacterium was identified as the most heritable gut microbe in humans, in which its presence is mainly determined by genetic background. C. minuta seems to play a major role in the development of a healthy gut microbiome coexisting with other important microbes, and missing in many chronically ill patients.

C. minuta in the gut has been associated with reduction in body weight and adiposity of mice. In a test on 977 volunteers, humans with higher levels of Christensenella in their guts were found to be more likely to have a lower body mass index than those with low levels. Christensenella are better represented in persons who are metabolically healthy. However, there is a link to possible pathogenic qualities of C. minuta in humans. An 18-year-old male presented with symptoms of appendicitis. Lab work revealed C. minuta was found in his bloodstream. Upon removal of the appendix, his symptoms and blood levels of C. minuta disappeared.

Characteristic	Specific to C. minuta
Morphology	non-spore-forming, non-motile, short rods
Gram staining	Gram-negative
Oxygen sensitivy	not extremely oxygen-sensitive
Optimal pH	7.5
Optimal temperature	37 - 40 °C
Catalase activity	catalase-negative
Utilized sugars	glucose, D-xylose, D-mannose, salicin, L-ramnose, and L-arabinose
Sugars that cannot be utilized	maltose, lactose, trehalose, sucrose, D-sorbitol, raffinose, D-mannitol, melesitol cellobiose
Enzymatic activity	β-galactosidase, naphthol-AS-BI-phosphohydrolase, α-arabinosidase, β-glucosidase, and glutamic acid decarboxylase

== Christensenella intestinihominis ==
Characteristic	Specific to C. intestinihominis
Morphology	non-motile, short rods, circular shape
Gram staining	Gram-negative
Oxygen sensitivy	obligate anaerobic
Optimal pH	6.0 to 8.5
Optimal temperature	37 - 42 °C
Catalase activity	catalase-negative
Utilized sugars	arabinose, glucose, mannose, rhamnose, xylose, mannitol, maltose, sulphata, pine syrup, raffinose, sorbitol

== Christensenella timonensis ==
Characteristic	Specific to C. timonensis
Morphology	non-motile, non-spore forming, bacilli
Gram staining	Gram-negative
Oxygen sensitivy	strictly anaerobic
Optimal pH	ND
Optimal temperature	37 °C
Catalase activity	catalase-negative
Utilized sugars	ND
