= Tepidisphaeraceae =

Scientific classification
- Domain: Bacteria
- Kingdom: Pseudomonadati
- Phylum: Planctomycetota
- Class: Phycisphaerae
- Order: Tepidisphaerales; Kovaleva et al. 2015
- Family: Tepidisphaeraceae; Kovaleva et al. 2015

Genera
- Fontivita; "Humisphaera"; Tepidisphaera

Family of bacteria

Tepidisphaeraceae is a family of bacteria.

== See also ==
- List of bacteria genera
- List of bacterial orders
