= Caldicoprobacter =

Scientific classification
- Domain: Bacteria
- Kingdom: Bacillati
- Phylum: Bacillota
- Class: Clostridia
- Order: Eubacteriales
- Family: Caldicoprobacteraceae; Yokoyama, Wagner & Wiegel 2010
- Genus: Caldicoprobacter; Yokoyama, Wagner & Wiegel 2010

Type species
- Caldicoprobacter oshimai Yokoyama, Wagner & Wiegel 2010

Species
- Caldicoprobacter algeriensis; Caldicoprobacter faecalis; Caldicoprobacter guelmensis; Caldicoprobacter oshimai

Genus of bacteria

Caldicoprobacter is a genus of bacteria from the family Caldicoprobacteraceae.

== Phylogeny ==
The currently accepted taxonomy is based on the List of Prokaryotic names with Standing in Nomenclature (LPSN) and National Center for Biotechnology Information (NCBI)

16S rRNA based LTP_10_2024

- Caldicoprobacter
  - C. guelmensis Bouanane-Darenfed et al. 2013
  - - C. algeriensis Bouanane-Darenfed et al. 2012
    - - C. faecalis (Winter 1988) Bouanane-Darenfed et al. 2015
      - C. oshimai Yokoyama, Wagner & Wiegel 2010

120 marker proteins based GTDB 09-RS220

- Caldicoprobacter
  - C. guelmensis
  - - C. algeriensis
    - C. oshimai [incl. Caldicoprobacter faecalis]
