= 16S rRNA (adenine1518-N6/adenine1519-N6)-dimethyltransferase =

Class of enzymes

16S rRNA (adenine^{1518}-N^{6}/adenine^{1519}-N^{6})-dimethyltransferase

Identifiers
- EC no.: 2.1.1.182

Databases
- IntEnz: IntEnz view
- BRENDA: BRENDA entry
- ExPASy: NiceZyme view
- KEGG: KEGG entry
- MetaCyc: metabolic pathway
- PRIAM: profile
- PDB structures: RCSB PDB PDBe PDBsum
Search
- PMC: articles
- PubMed: articles
- NCBI: proteins

16S rRNA (adenine^{1518}-N^{6}/adenine^{1519}-N^{6})-dimethyltransferase (EC 2.1.1.182, S-adenosylmethionine-6-N',N'-adenosyl (rRNA) dimethyltransferase, KsgA, ksgA methyltransferase) is an enzyme with systematic name S-adenosyl-L-methionine:16S rRNA (adenine^{1518}-N^{6}/adenine^{1519}-N^{6})-dimethyltransferase. This enzyme catalyses the following chemical reaction

4 S-adenosyl-L-methionine + adenine^{1518}/adenine^{1519} in 16S rRNA $\rightleftharpoons$ 4 Ribosomal RNA + N^{6}-dimethyladenine^{1518}/N^{6}-dimethyladenine^{1519} in 16S rRNA

KsgA introduces the dimethylation of adenine^{1518} and adenine^{1519} in 16S rRNA. Strains lacking the methylase are resistant to kasugamycin [1].
