= Caldicoprobacter faecalis =

Scientific classification
- Domain: Bacteria
- Kingdom: Bacillati
- Phylum: Bacillota
- Class: Clostridia
- Order: Eubacteriales
- Family: Caldicoprobacteraceae
- Genus: Caldicoprobacter
- Species: C. faecalis

Binomial name
- Caldicoprobacter faecalis (Winter et al. 1988) Bouanane et al. 2015

Type strain
- DSM 20678, JCM 30420

Synonyms
- Acetomicrobium faecale

Species of bacterium

Caldicoprobacter faecalis is a bacterium from the genus Caldicoprobacter which has been isolated from sewage sludge.
