= Pirellulaceae =

Scientific classification
- Domain: Bacteria
- Kingdom: Pseudomonadati
- Phylum: Planctomycetota
- Class: Planctomycetia
- Order: Pirellulales
- Family: Pirellulaceae; Dedysh et al. 2020

Genera
- See text

Family of bacteria

The Pirellulaceae are a family of bacteria.

== Phylogeny ==
The currently accepted taxonomy is based on the List of Prokaryotic names with Standing in Nomenclature (LPSN) and National Center for Biotechnology Information (NCBI).

16S rRNA based LTP_10_2024

- - - Blastopirellula
    - Bremerella
  - - - Pirellula
      - Anatilimnocola
    - - Mariniblastus
      - - Lignipirellula
        - - Aureliella
          - - Rosistilla
            - - Roseimaritima
              - - Stieleria
                - - - Novipirellula
                    - Rubripirellula
                  - - Crateriforma
                    - Rhodopirellula

120 marker proteins based GTDB 10-RS226

- - - Blastopirellula Schlesner et al. 2004
    - Bremerella Rensink et al. 2021
  - - - "Ca. Anammoximicrobium" Khramenkov et al. 2013
      - - Lignipirellula Peeters et al. 2021
        - - Anatilimnocola Kallscheuer et al. 2022
          - Pirellula Schlesner and Hirsch 1987
    - - Mariniblastus Lage et al. 2017
      - - Aureliella Kallscheuer et al. 2021
        - - Rosistilla Waqqas et al. 2021
          - - "Ca. Laterigemmans" Kumar et al. 2021
            - - Roseimaritima Bondoso et al. 2016
              - - - Crateriforma Peeters et al. 2021
                  - Rhodopirellula Schlesner et al. 2004
                - - Stieleria Kallscheuer et al. 2021 (incl. "Roseiconus" Kumar et al. 2021)
                  - - Novipirellula Kallscheuer et al. 2021
                    - Rubripirellula Bondoso et al. 2016

== See also ==
- List of bacterial orders
- List of bacteria genera
