= Isosphaeraceae =

Scientific classification
- Domain: Bacteria
- Kingdom: Pseudomonadati
- Phylum: Planctomycetota
- Class: Planctomycetia
- Order: Isosphaerales; Dedysh et al. 2020
- Family: Isosphaeraceae; Kulichevskaya et al. 2016

Genera
- Aquisphaera; Isosphaera; "Kueselia"; Paludisphaera; Singulisphaera; Tautonia; Tundrisphaera

Family of bacteria

Isosphaeraceae is a family of bacteria.

== Phylogeny ==
The currently accepted taxonomy is based on the List of Prokaryotic names with Standing in Nomenclature (LPSN) and National Center for Biotechnology Information (NCBI).

16S rRNA based LTP_10_2024

- - Tautonia Kovaleva et al. 2019
  - - Isosphaera Giovannoni et al. 1995
    - - - Tundrisphaera Kulichevskaya et al. 2017
        - Singulisphaera Kulichevskaya et al. 2008
      - - Aquisphaera Bondoso et al. 2011
        - Paludisphaera Kulichevskaya et al. 2016

120 marker proteins based GTDB 10-RS226

- - Isosphaera
  - - Tautonia
    - - Singulisphaera
      - - Aquisphaera
        - Paludisphaera

== See also ==
- List of bacterial orders
- List of bacteria genera
