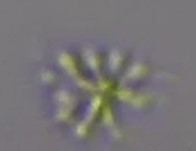
- Microscopy image of Planctomyces bekefii, showing how its stalk-like structures connect cells into a conglomerate.

Scientific classification
- Domain: Bacteria
- Kingdom: Pseudomonadati
- Phylum: Planctomycetota
- Class: Planctomycetia
- Order: Planctomycetales; Schlesner and Stackebrandt 1987
- Family: Planctomycetaceae; Schlesner and Stackebrandt 1987

Genera
- See text

Synonyms
- "Gimesiaceae" Rojas-Jimenez et al. 2021; "Rubinisphaeraceae" ?Foysal et al. 2019; "Schlesneriaceae" ?Hansen & Enders 2022; "Symmachiellaceae" Pallen, Rodriguez-R & Alikhan 2022

= Planctomycetaceae =

Family of bacteria

Planctomycetaceae is the only family in the order Planctomycetales within the Bacteria. Species within this family are mostly spherical, inhabiting a vast array of aquatic environments with the majority being in marine ecosystems. Planctomycetaceae species are generally aerobic, but are uniquely classified by fatty acid synthesis and stalk-like formations.

== Morphology ==
When compared to other species of the order Planctomycetales, species of the Planctomycetaceae family have very few unique characteristics that can taxonomically distinguish them from other related families. Planctomycetaceae species typically form colonies of a pink or white hue. Their cell structure has been recorded to be spherical, but many species are elliptical or pear-shaped; all species range from 0.4 micrometers to 2.5 micrometers in size.

When reproducing, cell structures of Planctomycetaceae are usually observed to be in either a rosette or aggregate grouping; the species Thalassoglobus neptunius is the only known example in this family capable of growing in chains. Some members of Planctomycetaceae (including other taxonomic groups of Planctomycetota) develop stalk-like projections. The species Planctomyces bekefii is well-known in this family for its stalks, using them to connect newly produced cells.

== Physiology ==
Families in Planctomycetales that have more research conducted have been noted to undergo anaerobic respiration, with the family Brocadiaceae being well known for its anaerobic ammonium redox (anammox) capabilities. Planctomycetaceae is one of the many families of Planctomycetales that is both aerobic and cannot do anammox reactions.

Similar to other families, members of Planctomycetaceae are capable of motility using flagella with some having cycles of motile and immotile lifestyles. Standing out from other bacteria, this group has been able to utilize its stalk-like structures to aid in biofilm production, providing a second source of adherence than usual extracellular polymeric substances.

Fatty acids and lipids synthesized by Planctomycetaceae are similar in composition to other families of the order Planctomycetales, but are unique enough to be considered taxonomically critical. Phosphocholine, phosphatidylcholine, and phosphatidylglycerol are considered the major lipids of this family, which only some other families are capable of synthesizing. Most notably, fatty acid C_{18:1}-ω9C is synthesized only within this family of Planctomycete bacteria.

== Phylogeny ==
The currently accepted taxonomy is based on the List of Prokaryotic names with Standing in Nomenclature (LPSN) and National Center for Biotechnology Information (NCBI). As of 2022, researchers have discovered that there are currently 14 genera and 29 species within Planctomycetaceae.

16S rRNA based LTP_10_2024

- - - Schlesneria
    - Planctopirus
  - - - Polystyrenella
      - Symmachiella
    - - - Fuerstiella
        - Gimesia
      - - - Thalassoroseus
          - - Stratiformator
            - - Calycomorphotria
              - Alienimonas
        - - Rubinisphaera
          - - Maioricimonas
            - - Caulifigura
              - - Planctomicrobium
                - Thalassoglobus

120 marker proteins based GTDB 10-RS226

- - - Planctopirus Scheuner et al. 2015
    - - Planctellipticum corrig. Wurzbacher et al. 2024
      - Schlesneria Kulichevskaya et al. 2007
  - - - Rubinisphaera Scheuner et al. 2015
      - - Maioricimonas Rivas-Marin et al. 2021
        - - Caulifigura Kallscheuer et al. 2021
          - - Planctomicrobium Kulichevskaya et al. 2015
            - Thalassoglobus Kohn et al. 2020
    - - - Thalassoroseus Kumar et al. 2023
        - - Fuerstiella Kohn et al. 2020
          - - - Calycomorphotria Schubert et al. 2021
              - Stratiformator Kumar et al. 2024
            - Alienimonas Boersma et al. 2021
      - - Symmachiella Salbreiter et al. 2021
        - - Polystyrenella Peeters et al. 2021
          - Gimesia Scheuner et al. 2015

Genera incertae sedis:

- "Lacunimicrobium" Kabuu et al. 2025
- Planctomyces Gimesi 1924
- "Rhodopilula" Frank 2011
- "Thermopirellula" Liu et al. 2012

== See also ==
- List of bacteria genera
- List of bacterial orders
