= Pirellulales =

Scientific classification
- Domain: Bacteria
- Kingdom: Pseudomonadati
- Phylum: Planctomycetota
- Class: Planctomycetia
- Order: Pirellulales; Dedysh et al., 2020

Families
- Lacipirellulaceae; Pirellulaceae; Thermoguttaceae

Order of bacteria

Pirellulales is an order of gram-negative bacteria from the class Planctomycetia.

== Phylogeny ==
The currently accepted taxonomy is based on the List of Prokaryotic names with Standing in Nomenclature (LPSN) and National Center for Biotechnology Information (NCBI).

16S rRNA based LTP_10_2024

- - Thermoguttaceae Dedysh et al. 2020
  - - Lacipirellulaceae Dedysh et al. 2020
    - Pirellulaceae Dedysh et al. 2020

120 marker proteins based GTDB 10-RS226

- - - Thermoguttaceae
    - Lacipirellulaceae
  - Pirellulaceae

== See also ==
- List of bacterial orders
- List of bacteria genera
