= Planctomycetia =

Scientific classification
- Domain: Bacteria
- Kingdom: Pseudomonadati
- Phylum: Planctomycetota
- Class: Planctomycetia; Ward 2020

Orders
- Gemmatales; Isosphaerales; Pirellulales; Planctomycetales

Synonyms
- "Planctomycetia" Cavalier-Smith 2020; "Planctomycetacia" Garrity and Holt 2001; Planctomycea Cavalier-Smith 2002; "Planctomycetes" Oren et al. 2015

Class of bacteria

Planctomycetia is a class of aquatic bacteria.

== Phylogeny ==
16S rRNA based LTP_10_2024

- - - Isosphaerales
    - Gemmatales
  - - Planctomycetales
    - Pirellulales

120 marker proteins based GTDB 09-RS220

- - - Isosphaerales Dedysh et al. 2020
    - Gemmatales Dedysh et al. 2020
  - - Planctomycetales Schlesner and Stackebrandt 1987
    - Pirellulales Dedysh et al. 2020

== See also ==
- List of bacteria genera
- List of bacterial orders
