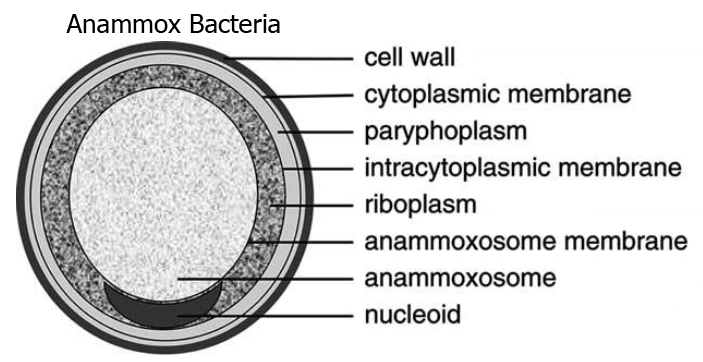
- Brocadia anammoxidans

Scientific classification
- Domain: Bacteria
- Kingdom: Pseudomonadati
- Superphylum: "PVC"
- Phylum: Planctomycetota; Garrity and Holt 2021

Classes
- "Ca. Brocadiae"; Phycisphaerae; Planctomycetia; "Ca. Uabimicrobiia"

Synonyms
- "Planctobacteria" (Cavalier-Smith 1987) Cavalier-Smith 2002; "Planctomycetaeota" Oren et al. 2015; "Planctomycetes" Garrity and Holt 2001; "Planctomycetota" Whitman et al. 2018

= Planctomycetota =

Phylum of aquatic bacteria

The Planctomycetota are a phylum of widely distributed bacteria, occurring in both aquatic and terrestrial habitats. They play a considerable role in global carbon and nitrogen cycles, with many species of this phylum capable of anaerobic ammonium oxidation, also known as anammox. Many Planctomycetota occur in relatively high abundance as biofilms, often associating with other organisms such as macroalgae and marine sponges.

Planctomycetota are included in the PVC superphylum along with Verrucomicrobiota, Chlamydiota, Lentisphaerota, Kiritimatiellaeota, and Candidatus Omnitrophica. The phylum Planctomycetota is composed of the classes Planctomycetia and Phycisphaerae. First described in 1924, members of the Planctomycetota were identified as eukaryotes and were only later described as bacteria in 1972. Early examination of members of the Planctomycetota suggested a cell plan differing considerably from other bacteria, although they are now confirmed as Gram-negative bacteria, but with many unique characteristics.

Bacteria in the Planctomycetota are often small, spherical cells, but a large amount of morphological variation is seen. Members of the Planctomycetota also display distinct reproductive habits, with many species dividing by budding, in contrast to most other free-living bacteria, which divide by binary fission.

Interest is growing in the Planctomycetota regarding biotechnology and human applications, mainly as a source of bioactive molecules. In addition, some Planctomycetota were recently described as human pathogens. The species Gemmata obscuriglobus has been identified specifically as comprising bacteria with unique characteristics among the Planctomycetota, such as their ability to synthesize sterols. Anammox, a highly promising process for biological wastewater treatment, is performed by biofilm-forming members of the phylum.

== Structure and morphology ==
=== Cell shape and appendages ===
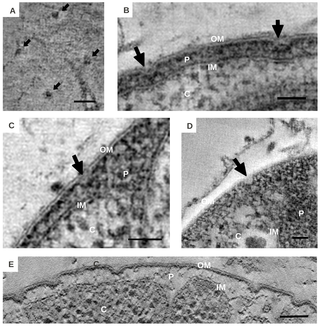
Crateriform structures. (A) Crateriform structures from the outside of the cell (B–E) Micrographs of crateriform structures, perpendicular to the membrane outer membrane (OM), inner membrane (IM), cytoplasm (C), and periplasm (P). Scale bars, 50 nm

The distinct morphological characteristics of bacteria in the Planctomycetota have been discussed extensively. The common morphology is often spherical cells roughly 2 μm in diameter, as observed in the species Aquisphaera giovannonii. However, the diversity in cell shape often varies greatly in them. Ovoid and pear-shaped cells have been described in some species, and often occur in rosettes of three to 10 cells. Gemmata obscuriglobus is a well studied species in the Planctomycetota with spherical cells. In contrast, bacteria in the species Planctopirus limnophila have ovoid cells.

Many Planctomycetota species display structures and appendages on the outer surface of the cell. Flagella, common in most bacteria, have also been observed in the species P. limnophila. Many Planctomycetota also have a holdfast, or stalk, which attaches the cell to a surface or substrate. Members of some species, though, such as Isosphaera pallida lack a holdfast.

Unique appendages known as crateriform structures have been observed in species of Planctomycetota belonging to the class Planctomycetia. The outer surface of cells in the species P. limnophila display both large and small crateriform structures. Large crateriform structures often cover the cell surface, while small crateriform structures are often only at the end of the cell. Light microscopy demonstrated fibers of both stalk and pili type in P. limnophila and G. obscuriglobus. The pili fibers in both these species were often associated with large crateriform structures; in contrast, the stalk fibers were associated with small crateriform structures.

=== Cell wall composition ===
Early examination of the Planctomycetota suggested that their cell plan differed considerably from both Gram-positive and Gram-negative bacteria. Until recently, bacteria in the Planctomycetota were thought to lack peptidoglycans in their cell walls, and were instead suggested to have proteinaceous cell walls. Peptidoglycan is an essential polymer of glycans, present in all free-living bacteria, and its rigidity helps maintain integrity of the cell. Peptidoglycan synthesis is also essential during cell division. Recently, those in the species G. obscuriglobus were found to have peptidoglycan in their cell walls.

=== Internal cell composition ===
Planctomycetota were once thought to display distinct compartmentalization within the cytosol. Three-dimensional electron tomography reconstruction of G. obscuriglobus displayed varying interpretations of this suggested compartmentalization. The cytosol was suggested to be separated into compartments, both the paryphoplasm and pirellulosome, by an intracytoplasmic membrane. This interpretation has since been demonstrated to be incorrect. In fact, the intracytoplasmic membrane is well known to be the cytoplasmic membrane which displays unique invaginations, giving the appearance of compartmentalization within the cytosol. Planctomycetota therefore display the two compartments typical of Gram-negative bacteria, the cytoplasm and periplasm.

The excess membrane observed in G. obscuriglobus triples the surface area of the cell relative to its volume, which is suggested to be associated with sterol synthesis.

=== Pigments ===
Many Planctomycetota species display pink or orange coloring, suggested to result from the production of carotenoid pigments. Carotenoids are produced by plants and fungi, and by some heterotrophic bacteria to protect against oxidative stress. Three different carotenoid pigments have been identified in two different strains of the Planctomycetota.

In marine environments, Planctomycetota are often suspended in the water column or present as biofilms on the surface of macroalgae, and are often exposed to harmful ultraviolet radiation. More highly pigmented species of the Planctomycetota are more resistant to ultraviolet radiation, although this is not yet well understood. It has since been shown that Planctomycetota synthesize C30 carotenoids from squalene and that this squalene route to C30 carotenoids is the most widespread in prokaryotes.

=== Unique characteristics of anammox cells ===
Bacteria in the Planctomycetota that are anammox-capable form the order Brocadiales. The cells of anammox bacteria are often coccoid with a diameter of about 0.8 μm, and are suggested to contain three compartments, each surrounded by a membrane. The outer membrane encloses the cell and the protoplasm and the innermost membrane surrounds the anammoxosome, the central structure of anammox bacteria. The anammoxosome membrane is largely composed of unusual ladderane-based lipids.

== Life history and reproduction ==
=== Growth ===
Planctomycetota species grow slowly, when compared to other bacteria, often forming rosette structures of 3-5 cells. The species P. limnophila is suggested to be relatively fast growing, with a doubling time of roughly 6–14 days. In contrast, some other Planctomycetota have doubling times of around 30 days. Their high abundance in many ecosystems is surprising, given their slow growth rates.

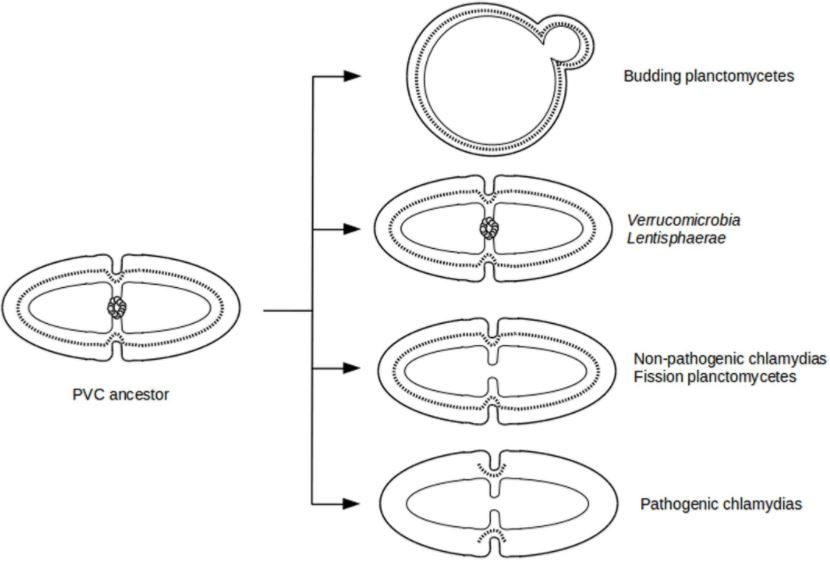
Representation of cell division modes in the last PVC common ancestor and in current the PVC superphylum: Outer membranes are represented by thick lines, and inner membranes are represented by thin lines. The peptidoglycan layer is displayed in dotted lines, and FtsZ proteins are displayed as a ring of gray circles.

=== Lifecycle ===
Planctomycetota often perform a lifestyle switch between both a sessile stalked stage and a free-swimming stage. Members of the species P. limnophila perform a lifestyle switch that is often associated with cell division. The sessile mother cell produces a free-swimming daughter cell. The daughter cell must then attach to a surface before starting the cycle over again. However, not all of the Planctomycetota have a motile stage, and the lifestyle switch observed in many species may not be common among all Planctomycetota.

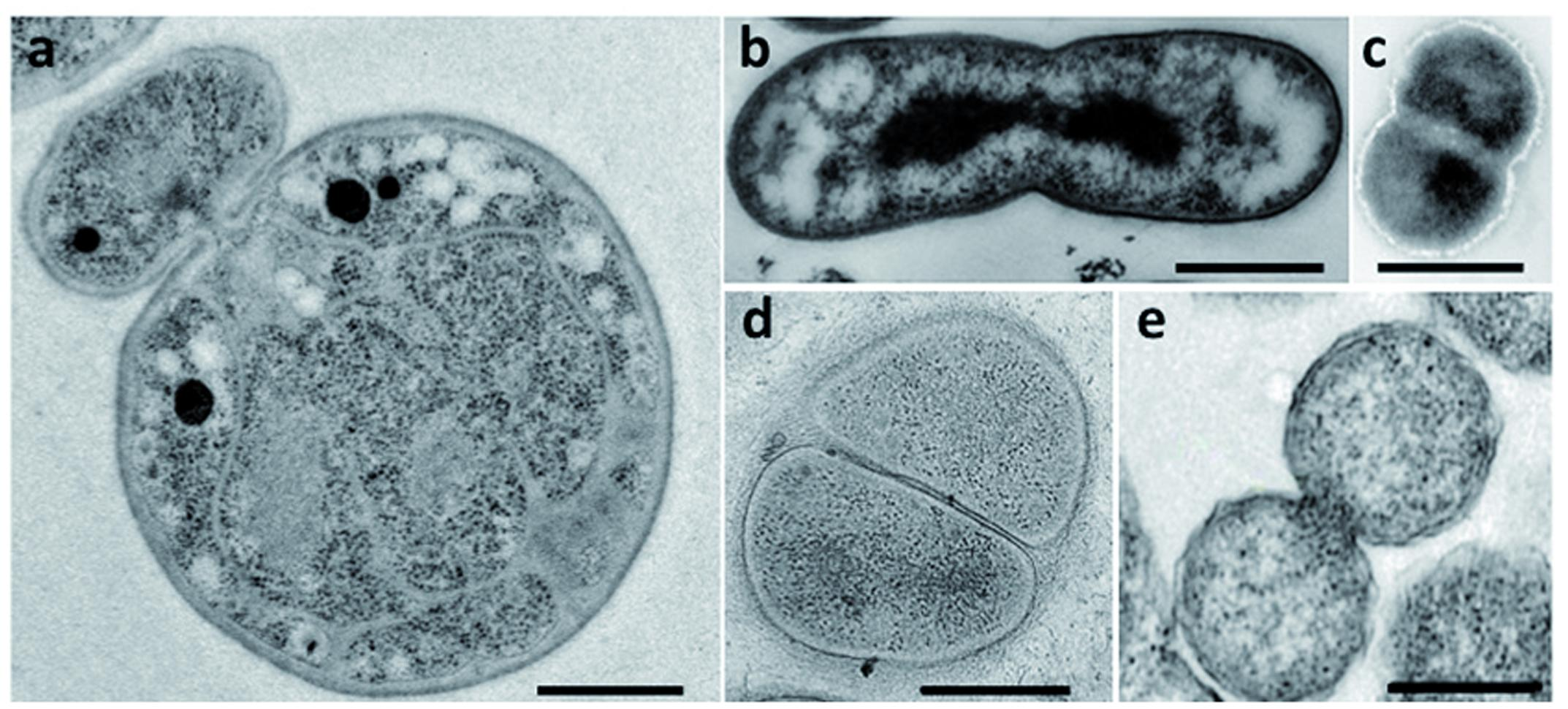
Transmission electron micrographs of dividing cells displaying different cell division modes in the PVC superphylum. (a) Gemmata obscuriglobus (b) Chthoniobacter flavus (c) Lentisphaera araneosa (d) Phycisphaera mikurensis and (e) Chlamydia trachomatis. Scale bars, 0.5 μm.

=== Reproduction ===
The current understanding of bacterial cell division is based on model organisms such as Escherichia coli. The dominant form of reproduction observed in almost all bacteria is cell division by binary fission, which involves the synthesis of both peptidoglycans and proteins known as FtsZ. In contrast, many bacteria in the Planctomycetota divide by budding.

FtsZ proteins are suggested to be similar in structure to that of tubulin, the protein present in eukaryotes, and is essential for septal formation during cell division. The lack of FtsZ proteins is often lethal. Peptidoglycan also play a considerable role in cell division by binary fission.

Planctomycetota is one of the only known phyla whose members lack FtsZ proteins. Bacteria in the Chlamydiales, also a member of the PVC superphylum, also lack FtsZ. Although bacteria in the Planctomycetota lack FtsZ, two distinct modes of cell division have been observed. Most Planctomycetota divide by binary fission, mainly species of the class Phycisphaerae. In contrast, species of the class Planctomycetia divide by budding.

The mechanisms involved in budding have been described extensively for yeast cells. However, bacterial budding observed in Planctomycetota is still poorly understood. Budding has been observed in both radial symmetric cells, such as bacteria in the species P. limnophila, and axially symmetric cells. During cell division in members of P. limnophila, the daughter cells originate from the region opposite to the pole with the holdfast or stalk.

Considerable diversity has been observed in cell division among bacteria in the Planctomycetota. During cell division in Fuerstia marisgermanicae, a tubular structure is connected from the bud to the mother cell. The species Kolteria novifilia forms a distinct clade of Planctomycetota, and is the only known species to divide by lateral budding at the middle of the cell. Lastly, members of the clade Saltatorellus are capable of switching between both binary fission and budding.

== Genetic characteristics ==
=== Molecular signatures ===
Planctomycetota are known for their unusual cellular characteristics, and their distinctness from all other bacteria is additionally supported by the shared presence of two conserved signature indels (CSIs). These CSIs demarcate the group from neighboring phyla within the PVC group. An additional CSI has been found that is shared by all Planctomycetota species, with the exception of Kuenenia stuttgartiensis. This supports the idea that K. stuttgartiensis forms a deep branch within the Planctomycetota phylum.

A CSI has also been found to be shared by the entire PVC superphylum, including the Planctomycetota. Planctomycetota also contain an important conserved signature protein that has been characterized to play an important housekeeping function that is exclusive to members belonging to the PVC superphylum.

=== General characteristics ===
The genome size of Rhodopirellula baltica has been estimated to be over 7 million bases, making it one of the largest prokaryotic genomes sequenced. Extensive genome duplication takes up about 25% of the genome sequence. This may be a way for the organism to adapt to mutations, allowing for redundancy if a part of the genome is damaged. The polymerase chain reaction primer used often mismatches with the genes, creating difficulty when sequencing the genome.

When comparing under a microscope, a defining characteristic for some Planctomycetota is that a single unlinked rRNA operon can be identified near the origin. The changes of genetic material is through internal chromosomal inversion, and not through lateral gene transfer. This creates a way of diversification in the Planctomycetota variants as multiple transposon genes in these regions have reverse orientation that transfers to rearrangements.

Some Planctomycetota thrive in regions containing highly concentrated nitrate, and have genes that are required for heterotactic acid fermentation. The enzyme lactate dehydrogenase plays a key role in this process. The genetic process also has ultraviolet radiation protection response, and is associated with the genes recA, lexA, uvrA, uvrB, and uvrC, in addition to a photolyase gene that is expressed when the environment offers excessive ultraviolet radiation stress. Other stress responses include the decomposition of hydrogen peroxide and oxidation.

Many Planctomycetota also express sulfatase genes. The genome of Pirellula sp. strain 1 incorporates 110 genes that contribute to encoding proteins that produce sulfatase enzymes. In comparison with a different species of prokaryotic, Pseudomonas aeruginosa, only 6 sulfatases occur and the genes that express these proteins are contained as two to five pairs, usually clustered in 22 groups.

=== Molecular evolution ===
Planctomycetota originate from within the Bacteria and these similarities between proteins in Planctomycetales and eukaryotes reflect convergent evolution. Gained protein families in Gemmataceae, a subgroup within Planctomycetota, have low sequence similarity to eukaryotic proteins; however, they show highest sequence similarity to other Gemmataceae protein families.

There is massive emergence of novel protein families within the Gemmataceae. More than one thousand protein families were acquired by duplications and domain rearrangements. The new paralogs function in signal transduction, regulatory systems, and protein interaction pathways. They are related to the functional organisation of the cell, which can be interpreted as an adaptation to a more complex lifestyle. The protein length is longer in the Gemmataceae than in most other bacteria and the genes have linkers. There is an overlap between the longest proteins in Planctomycetales and the shortest proteins in eukaryotes. In the terms of gene paralogy, protein length, and protein domain structures, prokaryotes and eukaryotes do not have sharp boundaries.

== Phylogeny ==
Originally classified as a eukaryote due to morphology, the advent of genetic sequencing allowed researchers to agree that the Planctomycetota belong to the domain Bacteria. Within that domain, Planctomycetota are classified as their own phylum, however, other researchers have argued they could also be categorized as part of a larger superphylum entitled PVC, which would encompass the phyla Verrucomicrobia, Chlamydiae and Lentisphaerae, and the candidate phylum "Candidatus Omnitrophica". Within this superphylum, its members have been found to be closely related through the creation of 16S rRNA trees. Both the Planctomycetota and Chlamydiota encode proteins for nucleotide transporters, and the Verrucomicrobiota have also been found to have features common among eukaryotic cells. Thus, a common ancestor of this superphylum may have been the start of the eukaryotic lineage. While this is one possible explanation, because PVC is not the start of the bacterial tree, the existence of eukaryotic traits and genes is more likely explained through lateral gene transfer, and not a more recent eukaryotic ancestor.

16S rRNA based LTP_10_2024

- - "Phycisphaeria"
    - Sedimentisphaerales
    - - Tepidisphaerales
      - Phycisphaerales
  - Planctomycetia
    - - Gemmatales
      - Isosphaerales
    - - Planctomycetales
      - Pirellulales

120 marker proteins based GTDB 10-RS226

- - - "Uabimicrobiia"
      "Uabimicrobiales"
    - "Brocadiia"
      "Brocadiales"
  - - "Phycisphaeria"
      - Sedimentisphaerales
      - - Tepidisphaerales
        - Phycisphaerales
    - Planctomycetia
      - - Gemmatales
        - Isosphaerales
      - - Planctomycetales
        - Pirellulales

== Ecology ==
=== Distribution and abundance ===
Members of the Planctomycetota are found in a diverse range of environments, both geographically and ecologically, and occur in both aquatic and terrestrial habitats. In aquatic environments, they are found in both freshwater and marine systems. Planctomycetota were originally believed to exist exclusively in aquatic environments, but they are now known to be also abundant in soils and hypersaline environments. They are widespread on five continents, including Antarctica and Australia.

Fluorescence in situ hybridization was used to detect Planctomycetota in various environments, and Planctomycetota are found in abundance in sphagnum bogs. Some Planctomycetota were found in the digestive systems of marine lifeforms, with many tending to live among eukaryotes.

=== Environmental influences on distribution ===
Planctomycetota account for roughly 11% of prokaryotic communities in marine systems, and their vast distribution demonstrates their ability to inhabit many different environments. They can also adapt to both aerobic and anaerobic conditions. Many factors can affect their distribution, such as humidity, oxygen levels, and pH levels. Planctomycetota diversity and abundance are strongly associated with relative humidity. The effects of oxygen levels demonstrate the energy needs of the individual. Many species of Planctomycetota are chemoheterotrophic, including G. obscuriglobus. Thermostilla marina, a thermophilic anaerobic species occupying hydrothermal vent regions, can use elemental sulfur to generate sulfide and respire with nitrate. Planctomycetota can also inhabit regions with ranges in pH levels from 4.2 to 11.6.

=== Ecological impacts and global carbon cycle ===
Planctomycetota have a significant impact on global biogeochemistry and climate, with their ability to mineralize and break down detritus particles in the water column.

Planctomycetota play a considerable role in the global carbon cycle. As both obligate and facultative aerobic chemoheterotrophs, the primary source of carbon used by Planctomycetota is from carbohydrates. Many Planctomycetota have the ability to breakdown extremely complex carbohydrates, making these nutrients available to other organisms. This ability to recycle carbon has been linked to specific C1 metabolism genes observed in many Planctomycetota and are suggested to play a significant role, but this area of research is still poorly understood.

Planctomycetota also display many sulfatase enzymes, which are capable of breaking down sulfated heteropolysaccharides, which are produced by many groups of macroalgae. The breakdown of these sulfated heteropolysaccharides by Planctomycetota are then used as an energy source. Some Planctomycetota are suggested to be capable of breaking down carrageenan.

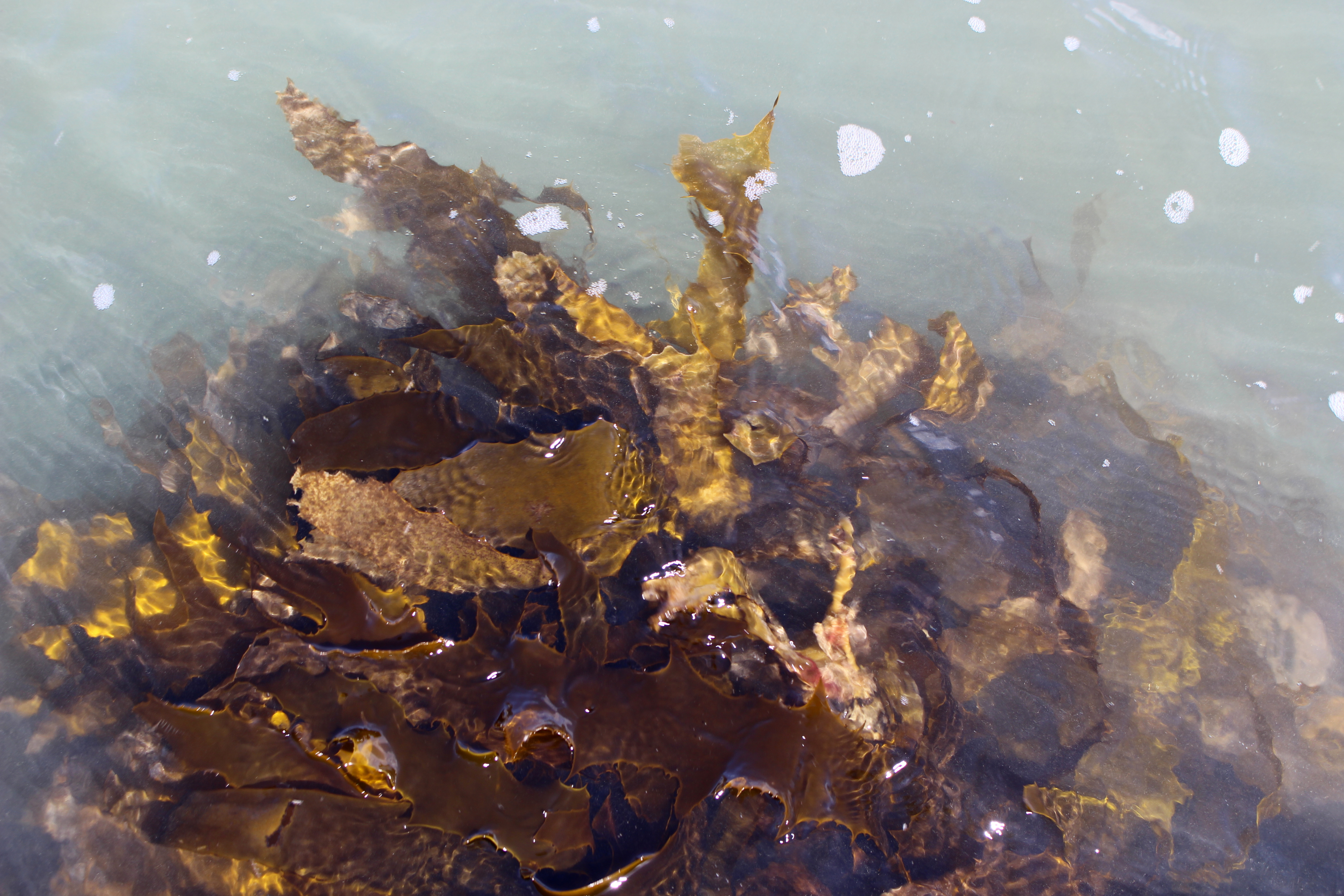
Ecklonia radiata, a species of kelp in the phylum Ochrophyta

=== Association with other organisms ===
Planctomycetota have often been observed in association with many organisms, including, macroalgae, microalgae, marine sponges, and plants such as lichens and bryophytes. They have also been observed inhabiting deep-sea cold seeps, where they are dominant organisms living on tube worms.

=== Macroalgae ===
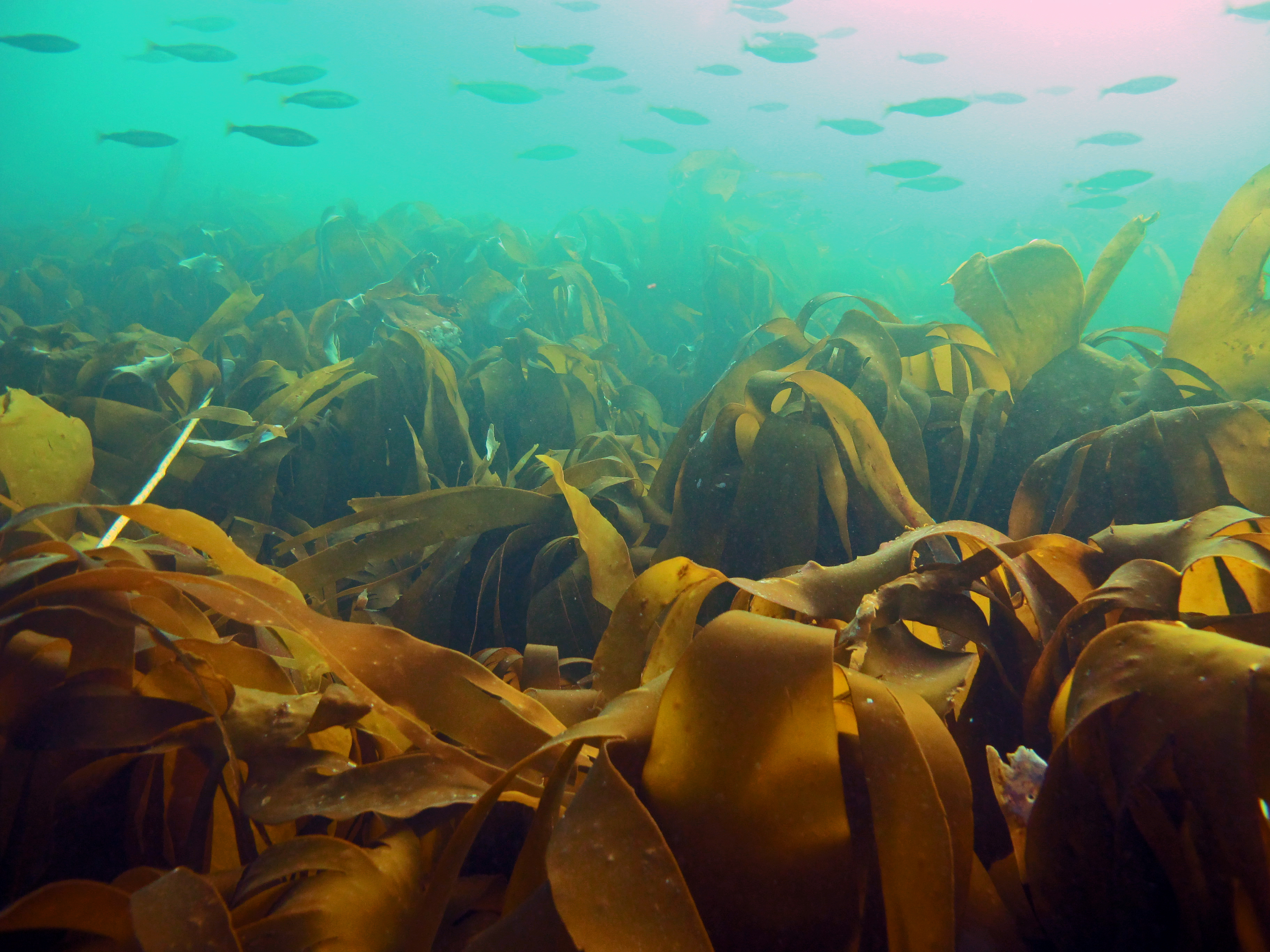
Laminaria hyperborea, a species of kelp in the phylum Ochrophyta

Planctomycetota are often associated with marine surfaces high in nutrients. They occur as biofilms on algal surfaces in relatively high abundance. Macroalgae such as the kelps Laminaria hyperborea and Ecklonia radiata are suggested to be an important habitat for Planctomycetota. Roughly 70% of the bacterial community on Ecklonia radiata were Planctomycetota. Almost 150 Planctomycetota species have been isolated from the biofilms of macroalgae, and these communities associated with macroalgae are mainly independent of changes in geographical distribution. This would suggest a symbiotic relationship.

Kelp forests dominate the rocky coastlines of temperate regions, and provide habitat, shelter, and food for many organisms, including the Planctomycetota. Given the considerable role of kelp forests in coastal primary productivity, the association of the Planctomycetota with kelp could indicate their significant role in coastal habitats. Planctomycetota also play an important role as components of detritus in the water column, also known as marine snow, given their ability to attach to surfaces.

As the climate continues to warm, the abundance of Planctomycetota associated with macroalgae might increase. The seaweed Caulerpa taxifolia was incubated under higher CO_{2} conditions, and the abundance of Planctomycetota increased substantially, as much as 10 times in some species.

=== Microalgae and diatom blooms ===
While macroalgae are well known substrates for Planctomycetota communities, their abundance has also been known to correlate with blooms of microalgae such as diatoms. Blooms of cyanobacteria, diatoms, and dinoflagellates provide nutrients for Planctomycetota, which could explain the association.

=== Marine sponges ===
Planctomycetota species are often associated with the surfaces of marine sponges. They interact with sponges either by attachment with a holdfast, or through a symbiotic relationship. A high diversity of Planctomycetota is present as biofilms on sponges. The symbiotic relationship among sponges and Planctomycetota contributes to the health of the sponge, and the sponge often provides suitable habitat and nutrients to the Planctomycetota.

=== Lichen communities and sphagnum bogs ===
Planctomycetota were found to be highly abundant in lichen communities throughout northwestern Siberia and displayed extremely high diversity. Planctomycetota have also been associated with lichen communities and Sphagnum wetlands. Sphagnum wetlands store large amounts of carbon, contributing to the global carbon cycle. Planctomycetota play a considerable role in the degradation of sphagnum, accounting for roughly 15% of the bacterial community.

=== Other bacterial communities ===
Planctomycetota display associations with other bacterial communities, mainly Alphaproteobacteria, Bacteroidota, Gemmatimonadota, and Verrucomicrobiota. The growth of many Planctomycetota is often supported by the essential nutrients provided by other bacteria within the community, and some Planctomycetota rely strongly on symbiotic relationships with other bacteria.

== Physiology ==
=== Endocytosis ===
The existence of membrane coat proteins near the intracytoplasmic membrane could be used for an endocytosis-like uptake system, which would be the first instance this function has been found outside of the eukaryotic domain. However, now that the existence of a rigid peptidoglycan cell wall has been confirmed, these vesicles to be able to pass through this cell wall seems unlikely. Additionally, deletion of one of these membrane coat proteins within P. limnophila found no decrease in macromolecule uptake. In addition, with the use of cryoelectron tomography-based three-dimensional reconstruction of Planctomycetota has found that what were originally thought to be vesicles being held in the periplasm are actually just folds in the cytoplasmic membrane. Yet it has been demonstrated that the Planctomycetota can survive on high-molecular-weight polysaccharides as their only source of carbon, meaning they must have the ability to incorporate complex carbon substrates into their cytoplasm. Three hypotheses have been put forth: First, the Planctomycetota excrete an enzyme which, outside of the cell wall, degrades the complex substrates into smaller monosaccharides, which can more easily be transported through the different membranes. Second, the complex substrates become anchored to the outside of Planctomycetota, which are then able to slowly break down these substrates into oligosaccharides, which are able to be transported into the periplasm of Planctomycetota by specialized proteins. The third hypothesis involves the crateriform structures found on the outside of Planctomycetota cell walls. These structures have fibers lining their pits that may be able to absorb whole polysaccharides into the periplasm, where they would then be digested.

Candidatus Uabimicrobium amorphum, discovered in 2019, became the first known bacteria that can perform phagocytosis by eating other bacteria. In 2024, another species, Ca. Uabimicrobium helgolandensis, was reported that showed similar cellular faetures including phagocytosis.

=== Osmotic regulation ===
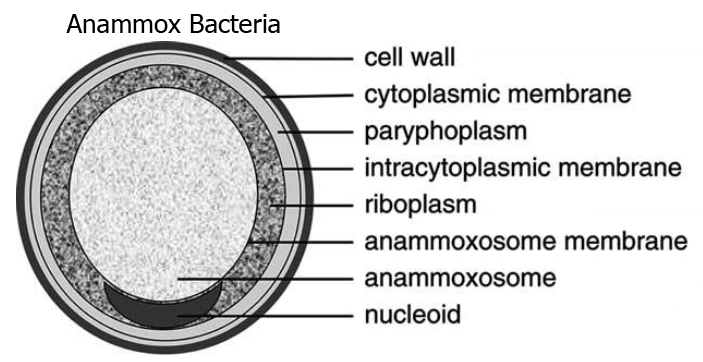
Labeled diagram of an anammox cell.

Almost all bacteria have a cytosol following the outer shape of their peptidoglycan cell wall. Eukaryotes are different in that they have their cytosol divided into multiple compartments to create organelles such as a nucleus. Planctomycetota are unique in that they have large invaginations of their cytoplasmic membrane, pulling away from the peptidoglycan cell wall and leaving room for the periplasm. Traditionally, the cytoplasmic membrane has been thought to be responsible for controlling the osmotic pressure of bacterial cells. Yet due to the folds in the cytoplasmic membrane, and the existence of large spaces of periplasm within Planctomycetota, their peptidoglycan acts as an osmotic barrier with the periplasm being isotonic to the cytosol.

=== Anaerobic ammonium oxidation (anammox) ===
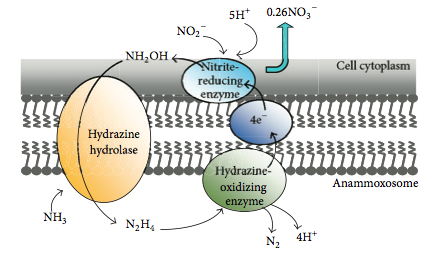
Diagram of the anammox mechanisms

Anammox is the anaerobic oxidation of ammonium where nitrite acts as the electron acceptor. This process creates energy for the organism performing the reaction in the same way humans gain energy from oxidizing glucose. In a marine environment, this ultimately removes nitrogen from the water, as N_{2} gas cannot be used by phytoplankton and is released into the atmosphere. Up to 67% of dinitrogen gas production in the ocean can be attributed to anammox and about 50% of the nitrogen gas in the atmosphere is thought to be produced from anammox. Planctomycetota are the most dominant phylum of bacteria capable of performing anammox, thus the Planctomycetota capable of performing anammox play an important role in the global cycling of nitrogen. Many researchers have designed wastewater treatment bioreactor systems using Planctomycetota as the biological chassis.

=== Sterol synthesis ===
The synthesis of sterols, often observed in eukaryotes and uncommon among bacteria, has been observed very rarely in Planctomycetota. The synthesis of sterols such as lanosterol has been observed in G. obscuriglobus. Lanosterol is common in eukaryotes and two other groups of bacteria, both methylotrophic Pseudomonadota and myxobacteria. The synthesis of sterols observed in G. obscuriglobus is unique within Planctomycetota. Sterol synthesis is suggested to be associated with regulation of membrane fluidity in Planctomycetota, and has been described as essential to the proper growth and reproduction of G. obscuriglobus.

== Biotechnology and human applications ==
Recently, interest has arisen in examining the Planctomycetota regarding their potential roles in biotechnology, mainly as a source of bioactive molecules, of interest mainly to the pharmaceutical industry. Bioactive compounds are mainly present as secondary metabolites, although little is known about Planctomycetota secondary metabolites. This is unexpected, as the Planctomycetota have several key features as other known producers of bioactive molecules, such as the Myxobacteria. However, a number of ongoing studies serve as various first steps in including Planctomycetota in small-molecule drug development for humans.

Planctomycetota species are worthwhile considerations in challenging the current models for the origin of the nucleus, along with other aspects of origin and evolution of the eukaryotic endomembrane system.

=== Climate change ===
The impacts of research on Planctomycetota and their uses might be of global significance with regards to nutrient cycling processes and assist in furthering understanding for global marine biogeochemistry. However, with Planctomycetota's growing influences on metabolic processes involving water and air, it may also have a role in interchanges between oceans and atmosphere, potentially affecting climate change.

=== Planctomycetota as pathogens ===
Planctomycetota species were recently identified as being an opportunistic human pathogen, but a lack of culture media limits studies on the bacteria in the Planctomycetota as pathogens of humans.

== See also ==
- List of bacteria genera
- List of bacterial orders
