= Scalindua =

"Candidatus Scalindua"

Scientific classification (Candidatus)
- Domain: Bacteria
- Kingdom: Pseudomonadati
- Phylum: Planctomycetota
- Class: Brocadiia
- Family: "Brocadiales"
- Genus: "Ca. Scalindua" Schmid et al. 2003

Species
- See text

Genus of bacteria

"Candidatus Scalindua" is a bacterial genus, and a proposed member of the order Planctomycetales. These bacteria lack peptidoglycan in their cell wall and have a compartmentalized cytoplasm. They are ammonium oxidizing bacteria found in marine environments.

== Introduction ==
"Candidatus Scalindua" is a bacterial genus, member of the order Planctomycetales. These bacteria lack peptidoglycan in their cell wall and have a compartmentalized cytoplasm. "Candidatus Scalindua" spp. can be further divided into three species: Scalindua brodae, Scalindua wagneri, and Scalindua sorokinii. They are ammonium oxidising bacteria found in marine environments. The genus "Ca. Scalindua" are the most abundant anammox bacteria in marine environments, so they are vital to the Earth's nitrogen cycle.

== Metabolism ==
Members of the proposed genus Scalindua are anaerobic anammox (ammonium oxidizing) bacteria. The ammonium-oxidizing reaction composes a significant part of the global nitrogen cycle; by some estimates it is the cause of up to 50% of total nitrogen turnover in marine environments. It consists of the oxidization of ammonium using nitrite as an electron acceptor (both are fixed nitrogen) and subsequent generation of nitrogen gas:

“NH_{4}^{+} + NO_{2}^{−} = N_{2} + 2H_{2}O (ΔG° = -357 kj mol-1)”

This reaction uses nitrite (NO_{2}^{−}) as a terminal electron acceptor to produce nitric oxide (NO), which is then combined with ammonium (NH_{4}^{+}) to produce the intermediate hydrazine (N_{2}H_{4}) and water (H_{2}O). Hydrazine, a very reactive molecule also used for rocket fuel, is then oxidized into nitrogen gas (N_{2}). The half reactions may be represented as:

“NO_{2}^{−} + 2H^{+} + e^{−} = NO + H_{2}O (E° = +0.38V)

NO + NH_{4}^{+} + 2H^{+} + 3e^{−} = N_{2}H_{4} + H_{2}O (E° = +0.06V)

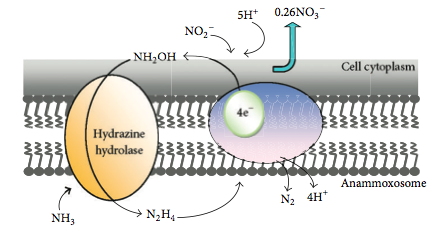
Mechanism of Ammonium Oxidation

N_{2}H_{4} = N_{2} + 4H^{+} + 4e^{−} (E° = -0.75V)”

This metabolic pathway occurs anaerobically, something that was once considered impossible as ammonium was thought to be inert in the absence of oxygen. In fact, the presence of oxygen over 2 μM inhibits the anammox pathway, which is why members of the proposed genus Scalindua respire anaerobically.

These reactions occur in a large membrane-bound cellular organelle called the anammoxosome, which contains an electron transport chain and an ATPase that pumps protons back into the cytoplasm from the anammoxosome lumen. It functions much like a mitochondrion in eukaryotic cells. The anammoxosome membrane is invaginated (folded in upon itself) to increase its surface area. The existence of membrane-bound cellular organelles is very unusual in prokaryotes, and appears to be limited to the members of the phylum Planctomycetota.

Anammox bacteria, including those belonging to Ca. Scalindua, fix carbon using carbon dioxide as a carbon source. Metagenomic analysis has revealed the presence of genes responsible for the “reductive acetyl-CoA pathway (also known as the Wood-Ljungdahl pathway) which allows for the creation of the precursor molecule acetyl CoA from carbon dioxide.

== Discovery and distribution ==
Ammonium and methane are known to be relatively difficult to activate with reactions catalyzed by enzymes that make use of high-potential oxygen radicals, which are unavailable to anaerobic life, leading to the assumption that both compounds were effectively inactive in low oxygen environments. Throughout the 1970s and 80s, results from several independent studies exploring relationships between methane and sulfate concentrations in marine sediments found indications that anaerobic methane oxidation was in fact a widespread occurrence. It was not until 1999 that the existence of anaerobic ammonium oxidation was first discovered in a wastewater treatment plant in The Netherlands and given the name “anammox,” which would later prove to be a key player as part of the marine nitrogen cycle. Some known anammox bacteria include Candidatus Scalindua, Kuenenia, Brocadia, Jettenia and Anammoxoglobus. Of these bacteria, only Candidatus Scalindua spp. can be found in marine ecosystems.

During the past, many microorganisms such as anammox bacteria may have escaped discovery due to their relatively low growth rates requiring very efficient biomass retention absent from classical methods of cultivation. With the use of biofilms to improve the culturability of organisms that naturally occur in biofilms, combined with the use of biomass retention to study slowly growing microorganisms under substrate limitation, a technique using sequencing batch reactors (SBR) was developed for the long-term enrichment, cultivation, and quantitative analysis of a very slowly growing microbial community. Phylogenetic analysis of the first anammox bacteria discovered concluded that the organisms branched deeply in the phylum, Planctomycetota, which was previously considered to be of limited environmental importance. Nitrogen loses that could only be explained by the process of anammox continued to be discovered in freshwater waste-treatment facilities around the world including North America, Asia, and multiple regions throughout Europe. The role of bacteria belonging to Ca. Scalindua in the marine nitrogen cycle has been found to be of important in the reduction of nitrate to atmospheric nitrogen in anoxic regions of the ocean. Since primary productivity in the ocean is often limited by nitrogen availability, the removal of usable nitrogen in sediments through anammox by Ca. Scalindua may significantly affect biogeochemical cycles in anoxic waters. In certain regions, such as the Golfo Dulce in Costa Rica, up to %35 of atmospheric nitrogen production in the water column can be attributed to Ca. Scalindua spp. In other regions such as the Black Sea, the world's largest anoxic basin, characterized by a large gradient in ammonium concentrations (high levels in deep water tapering off to only trace amounts in the suboxic zone), the apparent ammonium sink in the suboxic zone was identified to be the result of anaerobic oxidation by bacteria belonging to Ca. Scalindua spp.

== Morphology ==
Organisms within the genus “Candidatus Scalindua” are classified as gram-negative chemolithoautotrophic bacteria. This means that their carbon and energy largely come from inorganic sources. Furthermore, bacteria in the genus Ca. Scalindua are obligate anaerobes, so they are unable live in oxygen-rich environments.

As with all other organisms within the order Planctomycetota, the cell wall does not contain peptidoglycan. The cells are spherical in shape, with a diameter of roughly one micrometer, and contain compartmentalized cytoplasms. Furthermore, organisms within Ca. Scalindua have two inner membranes instead of one inner and one outer membrane surrounding the cell wall. Cells within Ca. Scalindua wagenri are oriented into compact clusters, whereas Ca. Scalindua brodae's cells are more loosely packed. All cells within Ca. Scalindua spp. contain unique organelles called anammoxosomes, which are membrane bound within the cytoplasm. Anammoxosomes are where anaerobic ammonium oxidation process occurs. The membrane that surrounds anammoxosomes in anammox bacteria contains unique lipids called “ladderane” lipids, which contain a series of cyclobutane ring structures. However, all other membranes within anammox bacteria are similar to organisms within the order Planctomycetales.

== Evolutionary history ==
According to Strous et al., anammox-capability is the result of a singular evolutionary event. All anammox bacteria are descendants of the same ancient Planctomycetota species that first evolved the anammox reaction. Members of the proposed genus Ca. Scalindua are the most widespread of all the genera of anammox bacteria described so far.

Currently, all anammox bacteria are thought to be members of the order Brocadiales.

== Taxonomy ==
Members belonging to Candidatus Scalindua are close genetic relatives to other anammox bacteria within the order Planctomycetales, such as "Candidatus Brocadia" and "Candidatus Kuenenia". Yet, members of Ca. Scalindua are quite different from other proposed genera of anammox bacteria in terms of their 16S ribosomal RNA sequences. For example, Candidatus Scalindua and Candidatus Brocadia only share 85% similarity in their 16S rRNA sequences. "Candidatus Scalindua" can be further divided into the following three species: "Ca. Scalindua brodae", "Ca. Scalindua wagneri", and "Ca. Scalindua sorokinii". Cells belonging to Ca. Scalindua spp. are the most abundant members of Anammox bacteria known to date, making it very important in the world's aquatic environments.

== Phylogeny ==
The currently accepted taxonomy is based on the List of Prokaryotic names with Standing in Nomenclature (LPSN) and National Center for Biotechnology Information (NCBI).

120 marker proteins based GTDB 10-RS226

- "Ca. Scalindua"
  - "Ca. S. sediminis" Zhao et al. 2020
  - - "Ca. S. rubra" Speth et al. 2017
    - - "Ca. S. arabica" Woebken et al. 2008
      - - "Ca. S. brodae" Schmid et al. 2003 ["Ca. S. sorokinii" Kuypers et al. 2003]
        - "Ca. S. japonica" Oshiki et al. 2017

Species incertae sedis:

- "Ca. S. chemeplantae" Litti et al. 2024
- "Ca. S. erythraensis" Ali et al. 2020
- "Ca. S. flavimaris" corrig. Ahmed et al. 2017
- "Ca. S. marina" van de Vossenberg et al. 2007
- "Ca. S. pacifica" Dang et al. 2013
- "Ca. S. profunda" Van De Vossenberg et al. 2008
- "Ca. S. richardsii" Fuchsman et al. 2012
- "Ca. S. sinooilfield" Li et al. 2010
- "Ca. S. wagneri" Schmid et al. 2003
- "Ca. S. zhenghei" Hong et al. 2011

== Ecological role ==
Candidatus Scalindua sp. is the only taxonomic group of ammonium-oxidizing bacteria found in the Black Sea, the Benguela Oxygen minimum zone off the coast of Namibia, and the estuary of the Randers Fjord, Denmark. Globally, members of Candidatus Scalindua spp. have been discovered in all marine environments that have been studied; most other marine bacteria are not this wide spread.

The ideal environmental conditions, with regards to temperature, pH and salinity for “Candidatus Scalindua sp.” are as follows: 10 to 30 °C, 6.0 to 8.5 pH and 0.8% to 4.0% salinity. No ammonium oxidizing activity was observed when salinity was 0%.

Marine sediments located in deep-sea methane seeps contain anammox bacteria associated with Candidatus Scalindua spp.; these bacteria likely have a substantial role in the nitrogen cycle in the sediments.

Two types of anammox bacteria belonging to Ca. Scalindua (59% abundance) and Ca. Kuenenia (41% abundance), have been found in the non-rhizosphere area of the saltmarsh grass Spartina alterniflora while only Ca. Scalindua was present within the rhizosphere. Moreover, it was in 1.5 times greater abundance than for other anammox bacterial in the non-rhizosphere sediments. Changing seasons do not affect the make-up of anammox-capable bacterial communities within the sediments in and around the rhizosphere; however, there was always a greater abundance of anammox bacteria within the rhizosphere that peaked in abundance during July and October when temperatures are warmest. During the warmer parts of the year both communities of anammox bacteria within and outside of the rhizosphere are more active, and produce more N_{2} with the bacteria in the rhizosphere producing almost twice as much N_{2}.

== Applications ==
Bacteria belonging to "Ca. Scalindua wagneri" are often used in wastewater treatment plants to reduce the adverse effects of nitrification and denitrification on the local environment. The use of anammox bacteria in wastewater treatment plants has a drastically reduced cost compared to previous denitrification methods. Furthermore, it is a much more environmentally friendly method.

== Species ==
- Scalindua brodae
- Scalindua wagneri
- List of bacterial orders
- List of bacteria genera
