= Brocadia fulgida =

Candidatus Brocadia fulgida

Scientific classification (Candidatus)
- Domain: Bacteria
- Kingdom: Pseudomonadati
- Phylum: Planctomycetota
- Class: "Ca. Brocadiae"
- Order: "Ca. Brocadiales"
- Family: "Ca. Brocadiaceae"
- Genus: "Ca. Brocadia"
- Species: "Ca. B. fulgida"

Binomial name
- "Candidatus Brocadia fulgida" Kartal et al. 2004

Species of bacterium

Candidatus Brocadia fulgida is an anammox bacterial species commonly found in wastewater sludge. Anaerobic ammonium oxidation, or anammox, is the bacterial metabolic strategy where nitrogen gas is produced in anoxic conditions, meaning no oxygen, through the metabolism of ammonium and nitrate or nitrite. Anammox metabolism is rare in nature and was only discovered in 1995. Though only a few anammox species have been identified, with estimates ranging from 23-27 species, these nitrogen-producing microbes are responsible for over 50% of Earth's atmospheric nitrogen. Ca. B. fulgida is able to be cultured, a property unique to fewer than 1% of microbial species. Candidatus refers to microbes that are well characterized, but have not been maintained in pure culture. Ca. B. fulgida is also the only known anammox species that can fluoresce.

== Phylogeny ==
Within the Planctomyces phylum are the four other genera associated with anammox species: Ca. Kuenenia, Ca. Jettenia, Ca. Anammoxoglobus, and Ca. Scalindua. The Brocadia genus contains seven species: Ca. B. brasiliensis, Ca. B. pituitae, Ca. B. fulgida, Ca. B. caroliniensis, Ca. B. sapporoensis, Ca. B. anammoxidans and Ca. B sinica.16S rRNA sequence comparisons are a common way of determining the relatedness of prokaryotic organisms. The prokaryotic 16S rRNA gene codes for the ribosomal RNA of an organism, which is necessary for building proteins and critical for the viability of the organism. Average Nucleotide Identity (ANI), compares the complete genomes of organisms to study their relatedness. 16S rRNA similarity values tend to be higher than ANI similarity values, because the 16S rRNA sequence is highly conserved in prokaryotes and does not mutate quickly. Ca. B. anammoxidans and Ca. B. fulgida have 16S rRNA similarities of 94%. Ca. B. sinica and Ca. B. fulgida share 80.39% ANI. Ca. B. pituitae and Ca. B. fulgida share 81.14% ANI. Ca. B. sapporoensis and Ca. B. fulgida share 96% of their 16S rRNA and 85.02% ANI. Ca. B. caroliniensis, the most closely related species to Ca. B. fulgida, shares an 86.33% ANI.

== Discovery ==
Anammox refers to anaerobic ammonium oxidation metabolism in which ammonium and nitrite or nitrate are oxidized to form nitrogen gas. Anammox bacteria are identified by ladderane lipids involved in the structure of anammoxosome, intracellular membrane-bound compartments that store the toxic hydrazine and hydroxylamine byproducts of anammox metabolism. Like other anammox species, Ca. Brocadia fulgida is slow growing, so it requires culturing via sequencing batch reactor. This method keeps substrate concentration low to mimic natural concentrations, provides a constant substrate flow, and allows biomass to settle.

The Kartal group at the Max Planck Institute for Marine Microbiology first described the species and was the first to grow Ca. B. fulgida in an enrichment culture in 2008. Specifically, Ca. B. fulgida was upregulated within a mixed culture of other bacterial species grown in a sequencing batch reactor inoculated with wastewater sludge collected from the Dokhaven sewage treatment plant in the Netherlands. The experimental conditions outlined in the paper were 7.0-7.3 pH, anoxic conditions, 33 °C, and two continuous media containing acetate and ammonium, nitrate, and nitrite, respectively. The acetate medium was filled at a flow rate of 0.35mL/min, and the nitrogen-containing medium had a flow rate of 1.4mL/min.

In this study, Ca. B. fulgida had the highest relative biomass and metabolized more substrate compared to the other anammox bacteria present in the mixed culture. Interestingly, it has the greatest rate of acetate oxidation even though acetate does not directly contribute to its biomass. To confirm the presence of Ca. B. fulgida within the culture, two methods were used. Direct viable count was conducted through FISH microscopy (fluorescent in situ hybridization) that fluorescently localizes specific DNA sequences with dyes. The fluorophores included the cyanine fluorophores Cy3 and Cy5 as well as a 5(6)-carboxyfluorescein-N-hydroxysuccinimide ester probe. Ca. B. fulgida genetic material was isolated, and its 16S rRNA was amplified through PCR (polymerase chain reaction) using the Planctomycetes primer set PLA46F/PLA886R. Primers surround the DNA sequences of interest so they are selectively replicated.

To determine that Ca. B. fulgida is an anammox species, the authors confirmed the two main indicators of anammox bacteria: anammoxosome presence and anammox metabolism byproducts. The authors posit that its lipid composition helps determine that Ca. B. fulgida contains anammoxosomes. A sample was centrifuged and dehydrated to isolate lipids for gas chromatography mass spectroscopy (GC-MS) analysis. The results corresponded to typical lipids found in anammox bacteria like ladderane lipids enclosing the anammoxosome. GC-MS identifies and measures the concentration of unknown compounds in a sample. Additionally, in this study, transmission electron microscopy (TEM) of thin slices of the biomass sample confirmed anammoxosome presence. TEM is an imaging technique that visualizes internal structure at high resolution. Anammox activity assays indicated that hydrazine was produced when hydroxylamine was present, hydrazine being an anammox byproduct.

== Morphology ==
Ca. B. fulgida has a doughnut-shaped cell when viewed under FISH and 4',6-diamidino-2-phenylindole (DAPI) stain while most anammox cells have a crest or sickle cell shape under these staining conditions. DAPI is a fluorescent stain that binds to nuclear DNA. Its cellular diameter exists between 0.7-1 um, within the normal range of anammox bacteria.

== Metabolism ==
Ca. B. fulgida is an anaerobic chemolithoautotroph, meaning that it lives in environments without oxygen, generates energy through chemical reactions with inorganic compounds, and uses carbon dioxide as a carbon source. Ca. B. fulgida participates in denitrification, the process of converting nitrate or nitrite to nitrogen gas. Anammox takes place in the anammoxosome and transport of inorganic nitrogen sources into the anammox cell occurs via transporters like nitrate/nitrite antiporter (narK) and ammonium transport protein (amtB). Then, cytochrome cd1-type nitrite reductase (nirS) reduces nitrite into nitric oxide, which reacts with ammonium to synthesize hydrazine, a toxic byproduct, using hydrazine synthase. The final step of denitrification concludes with hydrazine oxidized to nitrogen gas using octa heme cytochrome c proteins HAO and HZO. Overall, this process is exergonic, so it can power and provide electrons for the nitrate reductase complex to fix carbon dioxide via the acetyl-CoA pathway. The acetyl-CoA pathway uses carbon dioxide to synthesize complex molecules in anaerobic conditions.

In the Kartal et al., 2007 paper that conducted the initial characterization of Ca. B. fulgida, three activity assays were performed on samples isolated from the bioreactor. The microbial sample was processed through washing in media without the acetate, ammonium, nitrate, and nitrite substrates, put in an anoxic environment, then the substrates were added back in. In the Kartal paper's methods, anaerobic ammonia oxidation and ammonia were measured in the first four months. Anaerobic ammonium oxidation was quantified by measuring the concentration of nitrate with HPLC, high pressure liquid chromatography. Ammonia was colorimetrically determined with ortho-phthalaldehyde substrate. Nitrate reduction was measured through concentrations of nitrate, formate, and acetate determined through HPLC. Finally, hydrazine levels were assessed through levels of hydroxylamine and ammonium, the reactants of anammox metabolism.

Anammox can also be coupled with the sulfur cycle, called sulfammox, where ammonium and sulfate serve as substrates to produce sulfide, sulfur, and nitrogen gas. Ammonium oxidation to nitrogen gas is powered by nitrite reduction, and sulfate acts as the terminal electron acceptor. The sulfammox process typically occurs in anaerobic marine or freshwater sediment environments.

== Genomics ==
Its genome was characterized through metagenomics, a method that sequences the genomes of all members within the community, due to its long cultivation time. Ca. B. fulgida has a genome size of 2.8 megabases (Mb), 2,488 genes with 2,446 of them coding for proteins, and a GC-content of 45%. However, the GC-content, the proportion of the genome consisting of guanine and cytosine, may be skewed up due to overrepresentation of microbes with rich GC-content in the data set, even when comparing different sequencing technologies like Sanger sequencing and Roche 454 FLX. Sanger sequencing is an accurate method that reads one base at a time using radiolabeled bases. Roche sequencing is capable of reading long stretches of the genome. Similar to other anammox species, Ca. B. fulgida possess anammox-specific genes hzo and hzs, which code for hydrazine oxidase and hydrazine synthase, respectively. Ca. B. fulgida also has a gene similar to nirK which codes for nitrate reductase in other anammox bacteria. As a result of having this gene, Ca. B. fulgida has lower nitrite affinities than many other anammox species.

== Physiology ==
Ca. B. fulgida's nitrite half saturation constant (K_{s}), the nitrite concentration at which the organisms metabolizes it at half of its maximum rate, is 350±90 μM. This is considerably higher than the nitrite K_{s} values of closely related Ca. B. sapporoensis and Ca. B. sinica, meaning Ca. B. fulgida has a lower affinity for nitrite. Brocadia species are growth-rate strategists, meaning they have lower substrate affinities but higher growth rates. Ca. B. fulgida grows at an optimal temperature of 30-33 °C which is similar to other species in the Brocadia genus as well as other anammox species. The activation energy, the energy input required to initiate a reaction, for Ca. B. fulgida to facilitate annamox is 65.7 kJ/mol, higher than the activation energies of Ca. B. sapporoensis and Ca. B. sinica. The nitrite IC_{50}, the nitrite concentration required to inhibit Ca. B. fulgida's metabolism by 50%, is 13.2 mM which is higher than Ca. B. sapporoensis and lower than Ca. B. sinica. A higher IC_{50} means the substrate is a less potent inhibitor.

The Kartal et al., 2007 paper that conducted the initial characterization cultured Ca. B. fulgida in a sequencing batch reactor at 7.0-7.3 pH continuously filled with two media containing acetate and nitrogenous compounds, respectively. Over the first four months of culturing by the Kartal group, the nitrate, ammonium, and acetate concentrations were increased incrementally. Nitrate is used an electron acceptor. Ammonium and acetate were used as the electron donor for redox. It took two months for the Ca. B. fulgida population to reach half of its maximum size. Considering their doubling interval of 10–20 days and low culture yield, 2 months is reasonably fast.

== Density-dependent Autofluorescence ==
Ca. B. fulgida is an autofluorescent species, and this light emission is not seen in other anammox species. In a 2019 paper, Bollmann et al., characterized the autofluorescent behaviors of Ca. B. fulgida and determined that the bacteria's autofluorescence is limited to the outer part of the cell. They also found that Ca. B. fulgida has been shown to have three excitation-emission maxima pairs: 288-330 nm, 288-478 nm, and 417-478 nm. Excitation-emission maxima pairs are the wavelengths at which specific fluorescent molecules are most excited and emit the most light, respectively.

In an exploration of Ca. B. fulgida's maxima pairs, Bollmann et al. found that autofluorescence at each maxima pair has unique behaviors in relation to the optical density (OD) of the enriched culture being measured. Optical density is a measurement of light absorbance and scattering through a sample. It is a common tool for measuring the cell concentration of liquid cultures with higher ODs indicating more concentrated cultures. Bollmann et al. discovered that the intensity of Ca. B. fulgida's 288-330 nm autofluorescence increases with increasing OD and has the highest intensity of all three peaks, the autofluorescence intensity at 288-478 nm slightly decreases with increasing OD, and the intensity of autofluorescence at 417-478 nm peaks at 0.15 OD, rapidly decreasing at higher ODs. Ca. B. fulgida is no longer autofluorescent at 288–478 nm and 417–478 nm when it is co-cultured with Kuenenia stuttgartiensis, another anammox species. The authors of the Bollmann paper reasoned that this could either be due to the different environmental conditions required to grow both organisms or interactions between them.

== Environment ==
In general, anammox bacteria are known to decrease the amount of global fixed nitrogen gas and live in anoxic environments like wastewater treatment plants and marine environments. Ca. B. fulgida is found in ammonium-rich environments like industrial or agricultural wastewater treatment plants, anaerobic river beds, wetlands, estuaries, marine sediment, the subseafloor, and the Atacama Trench. Ca. B. fulgida can also be found in forest soils, contributing to the forest nitrogen cycle. A 2016 paper by Xi et al., found that anammox activity, including the activity of Ca. B. fulgida, is responsible for 1-7% of the nitrogen gas production from temperate forest soil.

== Industrial Applications ==
Ca. B. fulgida has been studied for its role in wastewater treatment by Cui et al. in 2020. The authors of this paper found that anammox bacteria like Ca. B. fulgida can be grown with denitrifying bacteria, bacteria that convert nitrates or nitrites to nitrogen gas, to be used as a biofilter that removes nitrogen from wastewater. In these biofilters, they discovered that Ca. B. fulgida outcompetes the other anammox bacteria and becomes the most abundant anammox species. This increased fitness could be due to Ca. B. fulgida's ability to utilize acetate as acetate is commonly added as a carbon source for microorganisms in wastewater treatment.

However, the activity of anammox bacteria decreases when the ratio of carbon to nitrogen in the water is too high. A 2014 paper by Jenni et al. found that the largest factor that affects anammox efficiency in wastewater treatment is the amount of time the bacteria are exposed to the sludge produced during water treatment. By testing various sludge retention times, the authors of this paper discovered that increased sludge retention time allowed for more complete nitrogen removal by the bacteria. Additionally, methanol was shown to stop bacterial anammox activity. The use of anammox organisms in wastewater treatment improves the process because less aeration and carbon are needed, which reduces cost and sludge production as well as lowers the carbon footprint of this treatment.

Another importance of Ca. B. fulgida is its potential to be used in zinc remediation. A 2022 paper by Wang et al. engineered Escherichia coli cells to express Ca. B. fulgida's hemerythrin, an oxygen transport protein, containing encapsulin proteins. These engineered E. coli cells showed increased zinc tolerance and delayed apoptosis, cell death, at high zinc concentrations. The authors of this paper found that the encapsulin proteins act by accumulating zinc ions in one part of the cell, which protects the rest of the organism. This zinc uptake has a valuable environmental role as zinc is a common and toxic industrial pollutant. The E. coli cells engineered in this 2022 paper also showed increased tolerance to cadmium ions, another pollutant.
