= Anammox for wastewater treatment =

Anammox is a wastewater treatment technique that removes nitrogen using anaerobic ammonium oxidation (anammox). This process is performed by anammox bacteria which are autotrophic, meaning they do not need organic carbon for their metabolism to function. Instead, the metabolism of anammox bacteria convert ammonium and nitrite into dinitrogen gas. Anammox bacteria are a wastewater treatment technique and wastewater treatment facilities are in the process of implementing anammox-based technologies to further enhance ammonia and nitrogen removal.

== Morphology and physiology ==
Anammox bacteria can be found in wastewater treatment plants, lakes, suboxic zones, and coastal sediments. Anammox bacteria are temperature-dependent, requiring temperatures between 30˚C to 40˚C to grow. Anammox bacteria growth is also impacted by pH, growing best at pH ranges of 6.5 to 8.3. Anammox bacteria are made up of an anammoxosome membrane, which takes up 50% to 70% of the cell volume, and a cell membrane surrounded by ladderane lipids.

== Chemical process ==
The two main chemicals needed for the metabolism of anammox bacteria to function are ammonia and nitrite. Nitrate and nitrite are produced by microorganisms within wastewater treatment facilities as a result of sewage treatment. The chemical compound ammonia monooxygenase converts ammonia in wastewater into nitrite during the nitrification process.

Anaerobic ammonium oxidation bacteria (Anammox) reactions, are mediated by the chemoautotrophic bacteria that are from the phylum Planctomycetota. Anammoxosome is the compartment within anammox bacteria where anammox reactions occur. During this process, a proton gradient is produced across the anammoxosome membrane, starting a catabolic reaction. Nitrate is first converted to nitric oxide in the presence of nitrate reductase, which is the first step in this reaction. Anammox oxidizes ammonium into nitrite, which is the reduced to hydroxylamine. Hydroxylamine and ammonia then react to form hydrazine, which is then oxidized into nitrogen gas.

=== Chemical reaction for anammox, conversion of ammonia to nitrogen gas ===
NH^{+}_{4} + 1.32 NO^{−}_{2} + 0.066 HCO^{−}_{3} + 0.13 H^{+} → 1.02 N_{2} + 0.26 NO^{−}_{3} + 0.066 CH_{2}O_{0.5}N_{0.15} + 2.03 H_{2}O

== Impacts on wastewater treatment ==
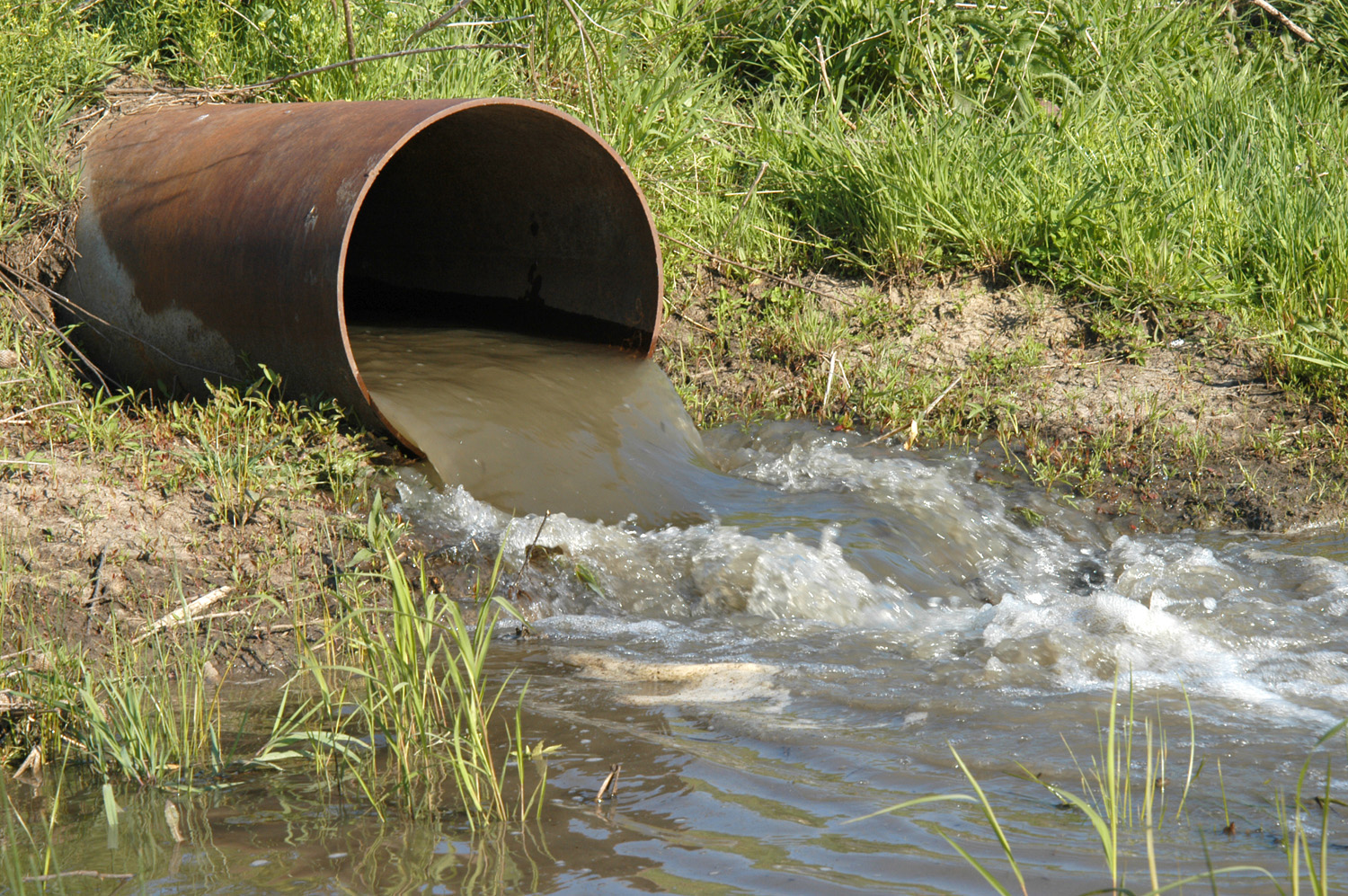
Wastewater

Wastewater usually exists in a mix of solid and liquid forms. The composition of wastewater varies depending on how it has been generated. "Wastewater" may refer to domestic wastewater, wastewater from industry, or surface water runoff. Treatment of wastewater to improve sanitation is a major challenge in developing countries, as untreated wastewater can contaminate drinking water.

Anammox bacteria treatments have been implemented in treatment facilities to help convert sewage wastewater into sludge ash, which is then used as a fertilizer source for agriculture. Sludge ash can be used as fertilizer due to its rich concentration of phosphorus and other nutrients necessary for plant growth. The crystallization of struvite (made up of magnesium, ammonium, and phosphate) during the wastewater treatment process can also be used as a fertilizer. The addition of magnesium to wastewater that already contains ammonium and phosphate allows for a 1:1:1 mole ratio in which all three elements bind to one another, allowing struvite to form as a product according to figure 1. The struvite crystals contain nutrients essential to plant growth that are easy to use and transport. This process also helps to recover nitrogen and phosphorus from wastewater, helping to improve surface water quality as these are two of the primary elements that can cause eutrophication. If eutrophication occurs, an anammox cycle can take place in the absence of oxygen and with high nitrite and ammonia concentrations. These two compounds are needed for the anammox cycle to begin, and are present in wastewater in high concentrations. The anammox bacteria present can help clean up wastewater of excess nitrite and ammonia.
