= Kuenen =

Kuenen is a Dutch surname. Notable people with the surname include:

- Abraham Kuenen (1828–1891), Dutch Protestant theologian
- Philip Henry Kuenen (1902–1976), Dutch geologist
- Gijs Kuenen (born 1940), Dutch microbiologist
- Johannes Petrus Kuenen (1866–1922), Dutch physicist
