= B. fulgida =

B. fulgida may refer to:

- Blackburnia fulgida, a ground beetle
- Brocadia fulgida, a bacterium that performs the anammox process
