= Sulfammox =

Microbial process

Sulfate reduction coupled to ammonium oxidation (anammox), or sulfammox, is a novel multi-step microbial process especially pertinent to industrial wastewater treatment. Microbial species associated with sulfammox include but are not limited to Anammoxoglobus sulfate, Bacillus benzoevorans, Candidatus Anammoxoglobus, and Bacillus cereus SUD-1. This list includes species that may perform sulfammox alongside other microbes, though SUD-1 was shown to perform sulfammox when isolated in an experiment.

== Application to wastewater treatment ==
Wastewater from industrial activities presents a danger to human and aquatic life as present compounds may exacerbate the eutrophication of water bodies, leading to toxic algal blooms, and may poison aquatic organisms and, by extent, humans. High levels of sulfate (SO^{2−}_{4}) and ammonium (NH^{+}_{4}) are present in wastewater, contributing to its dangers and toxicity, and thus facilitating their removal via sulfammox may be important in protecting human and aquatic life. The microbial anaerobic oxidation of ammonium (anammox) has been cultivated at wastewater treatment center for years in order to remove NH^{+}_{4}, but the removal of SO^{2−}_{4} has been typically treated as a separate problem requiring completely different microbial bioreactors – resulting in costly operations attempting to mitigate high SO^{2−}_{4} and NH^{+}_{4} separately. The opportunity to unify both processes into a single system – utilizing sulfammox alongside anammox – may thus be appealing as a cost-efficient alternative to removing both SO^{2−}_{4} and NH^{+}_{4} from wastewater.

One study found that "after 180 days" of facilitating sulfammox and anammox in landfill leachates, "the nitrogen and sulfate removal efficiencies of 95.7% and 24.3%, respectively, were obtained" with sulfammox accounting for "27.5% of total inorganic nitrogen removal" and anammox accounting for "65.6%". Although sulfammox has been estimated to be less metabolically efficient than anammox, it also may consume less energy than other processes; sulfammox enhancement in a bioreactor saved "44%... in aeration energy consumption".

Another study observed that excessively high SO^{2−}_{4} and NH^{+}_{4} – "NH^{+}_{4}-N was 181.62 mg·(L·d)^{−1}, SO^{2−}_{4}-S was 323.18 mg·(L·d)^{−1}" – was toxic to sulfammox microbes and slowed the removal of the compounds from a bioreactor. The study did reach similar removal efficiencies of NH^{+}_{4} and SO^{2−}_{4} as Zhang et al. 2023, with "94.80%" and "52.57%" removed respectively. The experiment also involved the addition of bicarbonate which may have competed with SO^{2−}_{4} to oxidize NH^{+}_{4} and impeded the analysis of nitrogen and sulfur-compound removal rates Artificial neural networks may assist in measuring the efficiency of sulfammox across various wastewater treatment centers and conditions, leading to its future optimization in removing harmful SO^{2−}_{4} and NH^{+}_{4} from industrial wastewater.

== History and possible redox background ==
Sulfammox was first observed by Fdz-Polanco et al. 2001 in industrial wastewater treatment centers utilizing anaerobic bioreactors and it was largely believed to be exclusive to such artificial environments. However, its presence has since been proposed and observed in natural anoxic environments – including marine sediments and anaerobic ocean waters

Though the mechanisms of sulfammox are not entirely clear, multiple studies have attempted to model the process in a series of chemical reactions. According to Liu et al. 2008, the following system of chemical reactions may represent the sulfammox pathway without organic carbon:

SO^{2−}_{4} + NH^{+}_{4} ⇌ SO^{2−}_{4} + NO^{−}_{2} + S + H_{2}O	(1)
NH^{+}_{4} + NO^{−}_{2} ⇌ N_{2} + 2 H_{2}O	(2)
NH^{+}_{4} + 1/2 SO^{2−}_{4} ⇌ 1/2 N_{2} + 1/2 S + 2 H_{2}O	(3)

However, Bi et al. 2020 found that anammox microbes could not perform sulfammox alone under strict anaerobic conditions and that sulfammox was, rather, a combination of aerobic ammonium oxidation, anammox and heterotrophic sulfate reduction processes. Specifically, Bi et al. 2020 postulated that facultatively aerobic ammonia-oxidizing bacteria, found living alongside anammox microbes and protecting them from oxygen leakage, could accomplish Equation (1) in the above system of equations representing sulfammox and provide nitrite to anammox microbes. Subsequent sulfate reduction was found to be attributed to sulfur-reducing bacteria.

Mohammed Madani et al. 2022, on the other hand, found that the SUD-1 strain of Bacillus cereus could perform sulfammox in isolation according to the model proposed by Liu et al. 2008. Liu et al. 2021 delineates sulfammox reactions involving organic carbon and sulfides:

3 SO^{2−}_{4} + 8 NH^{+}_{4} ⇌ 3 HS^{−} + 4 N_{2} + 5 H^{+} + 12 H_{2}O	(4)
CH_{2}O + 4 NH^{+}_{4} + 4 SO^{2−}_{4} ⇌ 5 CO_{2} + 2 N_{2} + 4 HS^{−} + 11 H_{2}O	(5)

Further models exist and multiple may partially or fully reflect present sulfammox processes both in artificial and natural environments.

== Astrobiological ramifications ==
Both Europa and Enceladus – Jupiter's and Saturn's moons respectively – may have a water subsurface ocean beneath their icy surface with ammonia and sulfate. The availability of these and other nutrients, including methane and potentially organics, have made them ideal candidates for plausible life outside of Earth. Considering certain sulfammox microbes' preference for slightly alkaline environments (8), Enceladus' alkaline subsurface ocean (8-11) may exhibit qualities more consistent with an environment capable of supporting sulfammox than Europa's potentially slightly acidic ocean. Extraterrestrial life is completely hypothetical, however, and many generations of work remain until humans may be capable of investigating the plausibility of life on Europa and Enceladus.
