= Scalindua wagneri =

Candidatus Scalindua wagneri

Scientific classification (Candidatus)
- Domain: Bacteria
- Phylum: Planctomycetota
- Class: Planctomycetia
- Order: Planctomycetales
- Family: Brocadiceae
- Genus: Candidatus Scalindua
- Species: "Ca. S. wagneri"

Binomial name
- "Candidatus Scalindua wagneri" Schmid et al. 2003.

Species of bacterium

Candidatus Scalindua wagneri is a Gram-negative coccoid-shaped bacterium that was first isolated from a wastewater treatment plant. This bacterium is an obligate anaerobic chemolithotroph that undergoes anaerobic ammonium oxidation (anammox). It can be used in the wastewater treatment industry in nitrogen reactors to remove nitrogenous wastes from wastewater without contributing to fixed nitrogen loss and greenhouse gas emission.

== Characterization ==
Candidatus Scalindua wagneri is a coccoid-shaped bacterium with a diameter of 1 μm. Like other Planctomycetota, S. wagneri is Gram-negative and does not have peptidoglycan in its cell wall. In addition, the bacterium contains two inner membranes instead of having one inner membrane and one outer membrane that surrounds the cell wall. Some of the near neighbors are other species within the new Scalindua genus, such as "Candidatus S. sorokinii" and "Candidatus S. brodae". Other neighbors include "Candidatus Kuenenia stuttgartiensis" and "Candidatus Brocadia anammoxidans". S. wagneri and its genus share only about 85% similarity with other members in its evolutionary line, which suggests that it is distantly related to other anaerobic ammonium oxidizing (anammox) bacteria.

== Discovery ==
Markus Schmid from the Jetten lab first discovered Ca. S. wagneri in a landfill leachate treatment plant located in Pitsea, UK on August 1, 2001. These bacteria doubled in number about every three weeks in laboratory conditions, which made them very difficult to isolate. Therefore, the researchers used 16S rRNA (ribosomal RNA) gene analysis on the biofilm of wastewater samples to detect the presence of these bacteria. They amplified and isolated the 16S rRNA gene from the biofilm using PCR and gel electrophoresis. Then, they cloned the DNA into TOPO vectors. Once the researchers sequenced the DNA, they aligned the 16S rRNA gene sequences to a genome database and found that the sequences are related to the anammox bacteria. One of the sequences showed a 93% similarity to Candidatus Scalindua sorokinii, which suggests that this sequence belonged to a new species within the genus Scalindua and the researchers named it Candidatus Scalindua wagneri after Michael Wagner, a microbial ecologist.

== Metabolism ==
Ca. S. wagneri is an obligate anaerobic chemolithoautotroph and undergoes anaerobic ammonium oxidation (anammox) in the intracytoplasmic compartment called an anammoxosome. During the anammox process, ammonium is oxidized using nitrite as an electron acceptor and forms dinitrogen gas as a product. It is proposed that this mechanism occurs through the production of a hydrazine intermediate using hydroxylamine, which is derived from nitrite. In addition, Ca. S. wagneri uses nitrite as an electron donor to fix carbon dioxide and forms nitrate as a byproduct. To the test the metabolic properties of Ca. S. wagneri, Nakajima et al. performed anammox activity tests using nitrogen compounds labeled with the ^{15}N isotopes and measured ^{28}N_{2}, ^{29}N_{2}, and ^{30}N_{2} concentrations after 15 days. The researchers found that the concentrations of the ^{28}N_{2} and ^{29}N_{2} gases increased significantly. These results suggest that ammonia and nitrite is used in equal amounts to make ^{29}N_{2}, and denitrification concurrently occurs with anammox metabolism.

== Genome ==
Currently, genomic information about Ca. S. wagneri is very limited. Current genome sequences were collected from DNA isolated from the bacteria growing in a marine anammox bacteria (MAB) reactor. Then, the 16S rRNA genes on the DNA were amplified using a specific oligonucleotide primer for Planctomycetales, separated using gel electrophoresis, and sequenced using a CEQ 2000 DNA Sequencer. Analysis of the 16S rRNA gene sequences was performed using the GENETYX program, and the alignments and phylogenetic trees were made using BLAST, CLUSTALW and neighbor joining, respectively. To have a better understanding of the genome, S. wagneri can be compared to one of its better-known relatives. For example, Candidatus Scalindua profunda has a genome length of 5.14 million base pairs with a GC content of 39.1%. There is no genomic information about the length or % GC content for Ca. S. wagneri. However, there are hundreds of 476 base pair partial sequences for its 16S rRNA gene. Using fluorescent in situ hybridization (FISH) analysis, a technique used to detect specific DNA sequences on chromosomes, researchers were not able to detect hybridization between the chromosome of Ca. S. wagneri and the putative anammox DNA probe. This suggests that Ca. S. wagneri is not very similar to the known anammox bacteria, so the researchers categorized the bacterium into its own genus.

== Ecology ==
Although researchers are unable to isolate pure cultures of Ca. S. wagneri, it is believed to encompass a broad niche. Using 16S rRNA gene analysis, Schmid first found evidence of the bacteria in wastewater treatment plants. Other researchers also found 16S rRNA gene evidence in a petroleum reservoir held at a temperature range between 55 °C and 75 °C in addition to freshwater and marine ecosystems, such as estuaries.

== Importance and useful applications ==
Ca. S. wagneri allows wastewater treatment plants to reduce operation costs while reducing the adverse effects of nitrification and denitrification on the environment. These bacteria contribute to the development of new technologies for wastewater management by aiding in the efficient removal of nitrogenous compounds in wastewater. Usually, nitrogen reactors use both nitrification and denitrification to remove nitrogenous wastes. These processes have high operation costs due to the continuous maintenance of aerobic conditions in the reactor. Denitrification also produces nitrous oxide (N_{2}O), which is a greenhouse gas that is detrimental to the environment. Production of N_{2}O contributes to the loss of fixed nitrogen, which regulates the biological productivity of ecosystems. By inoculating wastewater reactors with the anaerobic Ca. S. wagneri, operation costs can be reduced by about ninety percent without the production of greenhouse gases. This allows for better wastewater management in a more cost-efficient manner without contributing to climate change.
