= Gijs Kuenen =

Dutch microbiologist (born 1940)

Johannes Gijsbrecht Kuenen (born 9 December 1940, Heemstede) is a Dutch microbiologist who is professor emeritus at the Delft University of Technology and a visiting scientist at the University of Southern California. His research is influenced by, and a contribution to, the scientific tradition of the Delft School of Microbiology.

Kuenen studied at the University of Groningen, where he received both his Doctorandus degree and in 1972 his Doctorate (PhD) under the supervision of Professor Dr. Hans Veldkamp. The title of his thesis was ‘‘Colourless sulphur bacteria from Dutch tidal mudflats’’. After a short post-doc at the University of California in Los Angeles (USA), he returned as a senior lecturer to Groningen. In 1980, he moved to Delft to become the 4th Professor of Microbiology (succeeding M.W. Beijerinck and A.J. Kluyver) at Delft University of Technology. Kuenen's initial research interests were (the application of) bacteria involved in the natural sulfur cycle and yeast physiology and metabolism. His later interest in the (eco)physiology of nitrifying and denitrifying bacteria has led a.o. to the discovery of the bacteria within the phylum Planctomycetota that perform the Anammox process. In addition, his research has been focussed on (halo) alkaliphilic sulfur-oxidizing bacteria from soda lakes. Gijs Kuenen retired in 2005 but remains active in science.

== Awards ==
In 2004 Gijs Kuenen became a Knight in the Order of the Netherlands Lion, In 2005 he was elected Fellow of the American Academy of Microbiology. In 2006 he received the Jim Tiedje Award for his outstanding contribution to microbial ecology at the 11th International Symposium on Microbial Ecology in Vienna and in 2007 he was awarded the Procter & Gamble Award in Applied and Environmental Microbiology.

For his contribution to the founding of the education Life Science and Technology (Delft University of Technology and Leiden University) in 2005 he received an honorary membership of Study Association LIFE.

== Named after Kuenen ==
One of the five known anammox genera, with the single member Kuenenia stuttgartiensis, has been named after Kuenen. The Kuenen lab had named the first discovered species Brocadia anammoxidans, after the company Gist-Brocades (now DSM Gist), for which Kuenen did consulting work and in which wastewater the bacteria was discovered.
