= Scalindua brodae =

Scientific classification (Candidatus)
- Domain: Bacteria
- Phylum: Planctomycetota
- Class: Planctomycetia
- Order: Planctomycetales
- Family: Brocadiaceae
- Genus: Candidatus Scalindua
- Species: Ca. S. brodae

Binomial name
- Candidatus Scalindua brodae Schmid et al. 2003

Species of bacterium

"Candidatus Scalindua brodae" is a bacterial member of the order Planctomycetales and therefore lacks peptidoglycan in its cell wall, has a compartmentalized cytoplasm. It is an ammonium oxidising bacteria.
