= Hydrazine oxidoreductase =

Identifiers
- EC no.: 1.7.99.8
- CAS no.: 9075-43-8

Databases
- IntEnz: IntEnz view
- BRENDA: BRENDA entry
- ExPASy: NiceZyme view
- KEGG: KEGG entry
- MetaCyc: metabolic pathway
- PRIAM: profile
- PDB structures: RCSB PDB PDBe PDBsum
Search
- PMC: articles
- PubMed: articles
- NCBI: proteins

Hydrazine oxidoreductase (EC 1.7.99.8, HAO (ambiguous)) is an enzyme with systematic name hydrazine:acceptor oxidoreductase. This enzyme catalyses the following chemical reaction

hydrazine + acceptor $\rightleftharpoons$ N_{2} + reduced acceptor

Hydrazine oxidoreductase is involved in the pathway of anaerobic ammonium oxidation in anammox bacteria.
