= Anammox =

Anaerobic ammonium oxidation, a microbial process of the nitrogen cycle

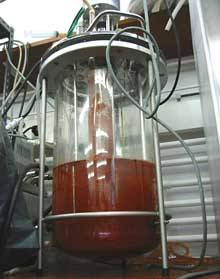
A bioreactor containing the anammox bacterium Kuenenia stuttgartiensis

Anammox, an abbreviation for ‘anaerobic ammonium oxidation’, is a globally important microbial process of the nitrogen cycle that takes place in many natural environments. The bacteria mediating this process were identified in 1999, and were a great surprise for the scientific community. In the anammox reaction, nitrite and ammonium ions are converted directly into diatomic nitrogen and water.

The bacteria that perform the anammox process are genera that belong to the phylum Planctomycetota. The anammox bacteria all possess one anammoxosome, a lipid bilayer membrane-bound compartment inside the cytoplasm in which the anammox process takes place. The anammoxosome membranes are rich in ladderane lipids; the presence of these lipids is so far unique in biology.

"Anammox" is also the trademarked name for an anammox-based ammonium removal technology developed by the Delft University of Technology.

== Process background ==
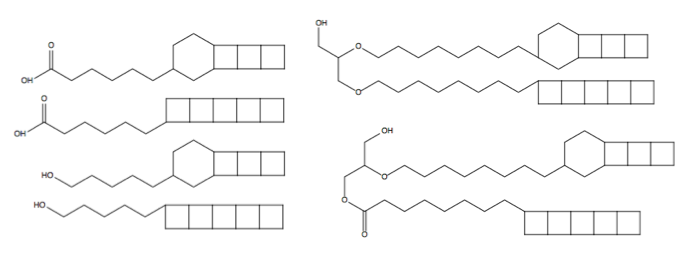
C17-C20 ladderane lipids from anammox bacteria containing either three linearly fused cyclobutane rings and one cyclohexane or five cyclobutane rings. Fatty acids are esterified with methanol or the glycerol backbone, and the ladderane alcohols are ether-linked with glycerol, all in different combinations.

In this biological process, which is a redox comproportionation reaction, nitrite and ammonium ions are converted directly into a diatomic molecule of nitrogen and water.

NH^{+}_{4} + NO^{−}_{2} → N_{2} + 2 H_{2}O (ΔG° = −357 kJ⋅mol^{−1}).

Globally, this process may be responsible for 30–50% of the N_{2} gas produced in the oceans. It is thus a major sink for fixed nitrogen and so limits oceanic primary productivity.

The bacteria that perform the anammox process belong to the bacterial phylum Planctomycetota. Currently, five anammox genera have been discovered: Brocadia, Kuenenia, Anammoxoglobus, Jettenia (all fresh water species), and Scalindua (marine species). The anammox bacteria are characterized by several striking properties:

- They all possess one anammoxosome, a membrane bound compartment inside the cytoplasm which is the locus of anammox catabolism. Further, the membranes of these bacteria mainly consist of ladderane lipids so far unique in biology.
- Of special interest is the conversion to hydrazine (normally used as a high-energy rocket fuel, and poisonous to most living organisms) as an intermediate.
- A final striking feature of the organism is the extremely slow growth rate; the doubling time is anywhere from 7–22 days.

The anammox bacteria are geared towards converting their substrates at very low concentrations; in other words, they have a very high affinity to their substrates ammonium and nitrite (sub-micromolar range). Anammox cells are packed with cytochrome c type proteins (≈30% of the protein complement), including the enzymes that perform the key catabolic reactions of the anammox process, making the cells remarkably red. The anammox process was originally found to occur only from 20 °C to 43 °C but more recently, anammox has been observed at temperatures from 36 °C to 52 °C in hot springs and 60 °C to 85 °C at hydrothermal vents located along the Mid-Atlantic Ridge.

== History ==
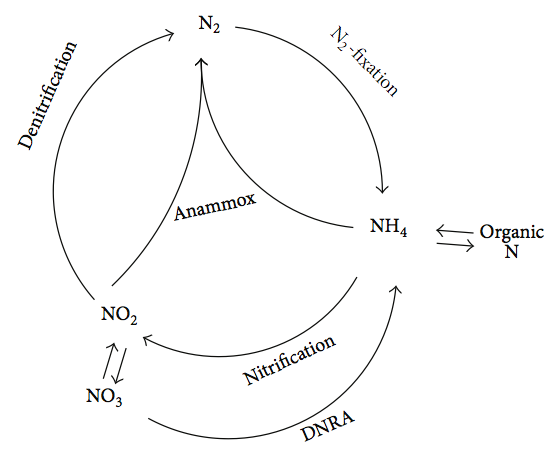
Figure 2. The biological nitrogen cycle, with dissimilatory nitrate reduction to ammonium

In 1932, it was reported that dinitrogen gas was generated via an unknown mechanism during fermentation in the sediments of Lake Mendota, Wisconsin, USA. In 1965, F. A. Richards noticed that most of the ammonium that should be produced during the anaerobic remineralization of organic matter was unaccounted for. As there was no known biological pathway for this transformation, biological anaerobic oxidation of ammonium received little further attention.

In 1977, Engelbert Broda predicted the existence of two chemolithoautotrophic microorganisms capable of oxidizing ammonium to dinitrogen gas on the basis of thermodynamic calculations. It was thought that anaerobic oxidation of ammonium would not be feasible, assuming that the predecessors had tried and failed to establish a biological basis for those reactions. By the 1990s, Arnold Mulder's observations were just consistent with Richard's suggestion. In their anoxic denitrifying pilot reactor, ammonium disappeared at the expense of nitrite with a clear nitrogen production. The reactor used the effluent from a methanogenic pilot reactor, which contained ammonium, sulphide and other compounds, and nitrate from a nitrifying plant as the influent. The process was named "anammox," and was realized to have great significance in the removal of unwanted ammonium.

The discovery of the anammox process was first publicly presented at the 5th European congress on biotechnology. By the mid-1990s, the discovery of anammox in the fluidized bed reactor was published. A maximum ammonium removal rate of 0.4 kg N/m^{3}/d was achieved. It was shown that for every mole of ammonium consumed, 0.6 mol of nitrate was required, resulting in the formation of 0.8 mol of N_{2} gas.

In 1995, the biological nature of anammox was identified. Labeling experiments with ^{15}NH^{+}_{4} in combination with ^{14}NO^{−}_{3} showed that ^{14-15}N_{2} was the dominant product making up 98.2% of the total labeled N_{2}. It was realized that, instead of nitrate, nitrite was assumed as the oxidizing agent of ammonium in anammox reaction. Based on a previous study, Strous et al. calculated the stoichiometry of anammox process by mass balancing, which is widely accepted by other groups. Later, anammox bacteria were identified as Planctomycetota, and the first identified anammox organism was named Candidatus "Brocadia anammoxidans."

Before 2002, anammox was assumed to be a minor player in the nitrogen cycle within natural ecosystems. In 2002 however, anammox was found to play an important part in the biological nitrogen cycle, accounting for 24–67% of the total N_{2} production in the continental shelf sediments that were studied. The discovery of anammox process modified the concept of biological nitrogen cycle, as depicted in Figure 2.

== Possible reaction mechanisms ==
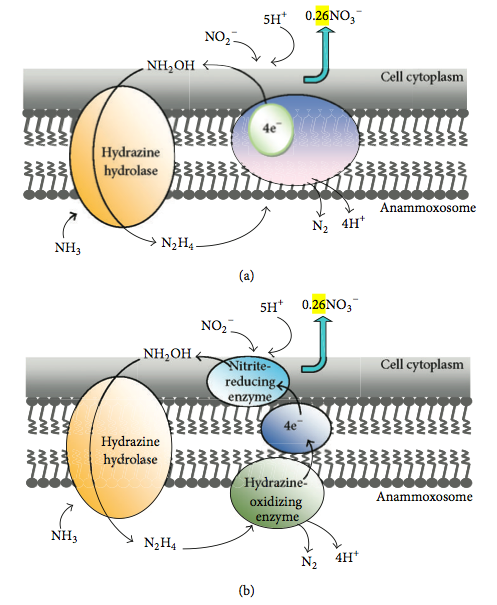
Figure 3. Possible biochemical pathway and cellular localization of the enzyme systems involved in anammox reaction.

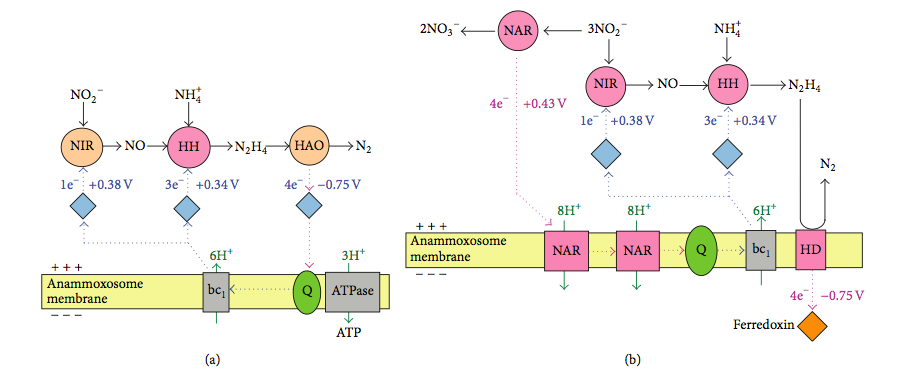
Figure 4. Hypothetical metabolic pathways and reversed electron transport in the anammoxosome. (a) Anammox catabolism that uses nitrite as the electron acceptor for the creation of a proton motive force over the anammoxosomal membrane. (b) Proton motive force- driven reversed electron transport combines central catabolism with nitrate reductase (NAR) to generate ferredoxin for carbon dioxide reduction in the acetyl-CoA pathway. HAO, hydrazine oxidoreductase; HD, hydrazine dehydrogenase; HH, hydrazine hydrolase; NIR, nitrite oxidoreductase; Q, quinine. Light blue diamonds, cytochromes; blue arrows, reductions; pink arrows, oxidations.

According to ^{15}N labeling experiments carried out in 1997, ammonium is biologically oxidized by hydroxylamine, most likely derived from nitrite, as the probable electron acceptor. The conversion of hydrazine to dinitrogen gas is hypothesized to be the reaction that generates the electron equivalents for the reduction of nitrite to hydroxylamine. In general, two possible reaction mechanisms are addressed:

- One mechanism hypothesizes that a membrane-bound enzyme complex converts ammonium and hydroxylamine to hydrazine first, followed by the oxidation of hydrazine to dinitrogen gas in the periplasm. At the same time, nitrite is reduced to hydroxylamine at the cytoplasmic site of the same enzyme complex responsible for hydrazine oxidation with an internal electron transport (Figure 3a).
- The other mechanism postulates the following: ammonium and hydroxylamine are converted to hydrazine by a membrane-bound enzyme complex, hydrazine is oxidized in the periplasm to dinitrogen gas, and the generated electrons are transferred via an electron transport chain to nitrite reducing enzyme in the cytoplasm where nitrite is reduced to hydroxylamine (Figure 3b).

Whether the reduction of nitrite and the oxidation of hydrazine occur at different sites of the same enzyme or the reactions are catalyzed by different enzyme systems connected via an electron transport chain remains to be investigated. In microbial nitrogen metabolism, the occurrence of hydrazine as an intermediate is rare. Hydrazine has been proposed as an enzyme-bound intermediate in the nitrogenase reaction. Recently, using detailed molecular analyses and combining complementary methods, Kartal and coworkers published strong evidence supporting the latter mechanism. Furthermore, the enzyme producing hydrazine, hydrazine synthase was purified and shown to produce hydrazine from NO and ammonium. The production of hydrazine from ammonium and NO was also supported by the resolution of the crystal structure of the enzyme hydrazine synthase.

A possible role of nitric oxide (NO) or nitroxyl (HNO) in anammox was proposed by Hooper et al. by way of condensation of NO or HNO and ammonium on an enzyme related to the ammonium monooxygenase family. The formed hydrazine or imine could subsequently be converted by the enzyme hydroxylamine oxidase to dinitrogen gas, and the reducing equivalents produced in the reaction are required to combine NO or HNO and ammonium or to reduce nitrite to NO. Environmental genomics analysis of the species Candidatus Kuenenia stuttgartiensis, through a slightly different and complementary metabolism mechanism, suggested NO to be the intermediate instead of hydroxylamine (Figure 4). However, this hypothesis also agreed that hydrazine was an important intermediate in the process. In this pathway (Figure 4), there are two enzymes unique to anammox bacteria: hydrazine synthase (hzs) and hydrazine dehydrogenase (hdh). The HZS produces hydrazine from nitric oxide and ammonium, and HDH transfer the electrons from hydrazine to ferredoxin. Few new genes, such as some known fatty acid biosynthesis and S-adenosylmethionine radical enzyme genes, containing domains involved in electron transfer and catalysis have been detected. Anammox microorganisms can also directly couple NO reduction to ammonia oxidation, without the need for nitrite supply.

Another, still unexplored, reaction mechanism involves anaerobic ammonium oxidation on anodes of bio-electrical systems. Such systems can be microbial fuel cells or microbial electrolysis cells. In the absence of dissolved oxygen, nitrite, or nitrate, microbes living in the anode compartment are able to oxidize ammonium to dinitrogen gas (N_{2}) just as in the classical anammox process. At the same time, they unload the liberated electrons onto the anode, producing electrical current. This electrical current can be used either directly in fuel cell mode or for hydrogen and methane gas production in electrolysis mode. While there is no clarity on the reaction mechanism behind, one hypothesis is that nitrite, nitrate, or dinitrogen oxide play a role as intermediates. However, since the process occurs at very low electrochemical potentials, other, more speculative, reaction mechanisms seem possible as well.

== The anammoxosome ==
The anammoxosome, a cellular compartment, is an organelle responsible for containing anammox processes and their associated enzymes. This compartment occupies the majority of the cytoplasm of anammox bacteria and is composed of a single lipid bilayer enriched in a unique combination of ester-linked (mainly found in bacteria and eukarya), ether-linked (mostly found in archaea), and ladderane lipids (unique to anammox bacteria). These lipids modulate the fluidity of the anammoxosome membrane, with the ladderane lipids providing the membrane rigidity, resulting in decreased membrane permeability to hydroxide and hydrogen ions. In addition to these ions, it is thought that increased rigidity prevents all byproducts and intermediates – such as hydrazine, that may be toxic to the cell – from permeating from the compartment, protecting the rest of the cell from damage. When anammox bacteria divide, the anammoxosome is also divided evenly between daughter cells.

The anammoxosome is analogous to eukaryotic mitochondria both structurally and functionally. Structurally speaking, the anammoxosome membrane is highly folded, similar to the cristae found in mitochondria. This feature serves to increase the surface area of the membrane to increase the amount of proteins that can be embedded within it, to maximize its metabolic efficiency. Another function of anammoxosome folding is to create binding sites for proteins that are specific to the topology of the folded membrane. In addition to folds, tubule-like structures have been found protruding into the lumen of the anammoxosome; however, the function of these structures remains unclear. The function of anammoxosomes in metabolism is similar to mitochondria, as both serve as the site of catabolic reactions, an electron transport chain, and ATP synthesis. The compartment is home to the enzymes that perform anammox processes such as a variant of hydroxylamine oxidoreductase, and hydrazine synthase. Oxidation of the different molecules along the process provides electrons to an electron transport chain, mediated by cytochrome C proteins. This chain pumps protons (H^{+}) from the cytoplasm of the cell into the lumen to establish a membrane potential and ultimately pass through an F_{1}F_{O} ATP synthase to synthesize ATP.

One additional feature found within the anammoxosome is the presence of iron storage proteins. While the purpose of these inclusions is unclear, one explanation for their presence suggests that they may have a role in response to an iron-limiting environment. Iron that is stored in these proteins may be used in limiting environments for iron respiration or for use in heme proteins involved in the electron transport chain of the anammoxosome.

== Species diversity ==
Until now, ten anammox species have been described, including seven that are available in laboratory enrichment cultures. All have the taxonomical status of Candidatus, as none were obtained as classical pure cultures. Known species are divided over five genera:

1. Kuenenia, one species: Kuenenia stuttgartiensis.
2. Brocadia, three species: B. anammoxidans, B. fulgida, and B. sinica.
3. Anammoxoglobus, one species: A. propionicus.
4. Jettenia, one species: J. asiatica.
5. Scalindua, four species: S. brodae, S. sorokinii, S. wagneri, and S. profunda.

Representatives of the first four genera were enriched from sludge from wastewater treatment plants; K. stuttgartiensis, B. anammoxidans, B. fulgida, and A. propionicus were even obtained from the same inoculum. Scalindua dominates the marine environment, but is also found in some freshwater ecosystems and wastewater treatment plants.

Together, these 10 species likely only represent a minute fraction of anammox biodiversity. For instance, there are currently over 2000 16S rRNA gene sequences affiliated with anammox bacteria that have been deposited to the Genbank (https://www.ncbi.nlm.nih.gov/genbank/), representing an overlooked continuum of species, subspecies, and strains, each apparently having found its specific niche in the wide variety of habitats where anammox bacteria are encountered. Species microdiversity is particularly impressive for the marine representative Scalindua. A question that remains to be investigated is which environmental factors determine species differentiation among anammox bacteria.

The sequence identities of the anammox 16S rRNA genes range from 87 to 99%, and phylogenetic analysis places them all within the phylum Planctomycetota, which form the PVC superphylum together with Verrucomicrobia and Chlamydiae. Within the Planctomycetota, anammox bacteria deeply branch as a monophyletic clade. Their phylogenetic position together with a broad range of specific physiological, cellular, and molecular traits give anammox bacteria their own order Brocadiales.

== Biogeochemical significance ==
=== Global Nitrogen Budget ===
As explained above, anammox is a crucial process involved in the nitrogen cycle that allows nitrogen to return into the atmosphere as a nitrogen gas (N2). Scientists thought denitrification was the only method in which this could occur. However, now we are aware that anammox can account for an estimated amount of 30-50% of the nitrogen loss in the ocean. Essentially, denitrification needs organic carbon to function. Anammox bacteria does not utilize organic carbon, instead, it directly utilizes ammonium (NH4+) and nitrite (NO2-). By allowing a method for nitrogen removal that does not need carbon-limited regions, the anammox is able to explain how the higher levels of N2 production can occur in carbon-limited regions of the deep ocean. Because of these processes, anammox is essential in environments where nutrients are not as prominent.

=== Oxygen Minimum Zones (OMZ's) ===
Anammox is more crucial in areas of the ocean that are known to have very low oxygen. These areas are known as Oxygen Minimum Zones (OMZ's). These zones can include the Arabian Sea and the Eastern Tropical South Pacific Sea. In these specific areas, anammox can be more crucial than denitrification. As the oceans begin to warm and lose oxygen, these zones tend to increase. Thus, the anammox activity also increases. The suitability of habitat for the anammox bacteria expands because of the ocean deoxygenation. This shift has shown significant issues in the primary productivity of the Earth since removing fixed nitrogen is able to limit the growth of phytoplankton, which is known as the base of the marine food web.

=== Benthic and terrestrial ecosystems ===
While most studies on anammox focuses on the ocean, it is also crucial to consider the seafloor sediments that are on the land. In the deeper levels of the sea floor, anammox bacteria is able to help permanently remove nitrogen prior to its burial in the Earth's crust. Anammox has also been in found in other different environments and ecosystems including freshwater lakes, riverbanks, and agricultural soils (like rice paddies). From a climate based perspective, anammox is seen as a cleaner way of removing nitrogen in comparison to denitrification since it is able to produce a lesser amount of nitrous oxide (N2O) which is known to be a powerful greenhouse gas.

== Application in wastewater treatment ==
The application of the anammox process lies in the removal of ammonium in the wastewater treatment and consists of two separate processes.
The first step is the partial nitrification (nitritation) of half of the ammonium to nitrite by ammonia oxidizing bacteria:

2 NH^{+}_{4} + 3 O_{2} → 2 NO^{−}_{2} + 4 H^{+} + 2 H_{2}O

The remaining half of the ammonium and the newly formed nitrite are converted in the anammox process to diatomic nitrogen gas and ~15 % nitrate (not shown) by anammox bacteria:

NH^{+}_{4} + NO^{−}_{2} → N_{2} + 2 H_{2}O

Both processes can take place in 1 reactor where two guilds of bacteria form compact granules.

For the enrichment of the anammox organisms a granular biomass or biofilm system seems to be especially suited in which the necessary sludge age of more than 20 days can be ensured. Possible reactors are sequencing batch reactors (SBR), moving bed reactors or gas-lift-loop reactors. The cost reduction compared to conventional nitrogen removal is considerable; the technique is still young but proven in several fullscale installations.

The first full scale reactor intended for the application of anammox bacteria was built in the Netherlands in 2002. In other wastewater treatment plants, such as the one in Germany (Hattingen), anammox activity is coincidentally observed though were not built for that purpose. As of 2006, there are three full scale processes in The Netherlands: one in a municipal wastewater treatment plant (in Rotterdam), and two on industrial effluent. One is a tannery, the other a potato processing plant.

=== Advantages ===
Conventional nitrogen removal from ammonium-rich wastewater is accomplished in two separate steps: nitrification, which is mediated by aerobic ammonia- and nitrite-oxidizing bacteria and denitrification carried out by denitrifiers, which reduce nitrate to N_{2} with the input of suitable electron donors. Aeration and input of organic substrates (typically methanol) show that these two processes are:

1. Highly energy consuming: Plant energy use is largely accounted for through aeration in its traditional form.
2. Associated with the production of excess sludge: Further handling and removal is necessary.
3. Produce significant amounts of green-house gases such as CO_{2} and N_{2}O and ozone-depleting NO: These specific systems are able to produce copious amounts of greenhouse gases. These gases include CO2, N2O, and NO. Studies show that anammox is a cleaner method in comparison to denitrification since it produces a lesser amount of N2O.

Because anammox bacteria convert ammonium and nitrite directly to N_{2} anaerobically, this process does not require aeration and other electron donors. Nevertheless, oxygen is still required for the production of nitrite by ammonia-oxidizing bacteria. However, in partial nitritation/anammox systems, oxygen demand is greatly reduced because only half of the ammonium needs to be oxidized to nitrite instead of full conversion to nitrate. The autotrophic nature of anammox bacteria and ammonia-oxidizing bacteria guarantee a low yield and thus less sludge production. Additionally, anammox bacteria easily form stable self-aggregated biofilm (granules) allowing reliable operation of compact systems characterized by high biomass concentration and conversion rate up to 5–10 kg N m^{−3}. Overall, it has been shown that efficient application of the anammox process in wastewater treatment results in a cost reduction of up to 60% as well as lower CO_{2} emissions.

=== Disadvantages ===
The doubling time is slow, between 10 days to 2 weeks. This makes it difficult to grow enough sludge for a wastewater treatment reactor. Also the recovery time after the loss of sludge by accident is longer than in conventional nitrogen removal systems. On the other hand, this slow growing rate is an advantage due to the reduction of surplus sludge that needs to be removed and treated. Depending on the exact species, the optimum pH level is 8. Therefore, it can be necessary to adjust the pH of the wastewater by adding caustic.
