= Dinitrogen oxide =

Dinitrogen oxide can potentially refer to any of at least four compounds:

- Dinitrogen monoxide (nitrous oxide), N_{2}O
- Dinitrogen dioxide, N_{2}O_{2}, an unstable dimer of nitric oxide
- Dinitrogen trioxide, N_{2}O_{3}
- Dinitrogen tetroxide, N_{2}O_{4}
- Dinitrogen pentoxide, N_{2}O_{5}
