= Brocadia =

Scientific classification (Candidatus)
- Domain: Bacteria
- Kingdom: Pseudomonadati
- Phylum: Planctomycetota
- Class: Brocadiia
- Family: "Brocadiales"
- Genus: "Ca. Brocadia"; Jetten et al. 2001

Type species
- "Ca. Brocadia anammoxidans" Jetten et al. 2001

Species
- "Ca. B. anammoxidans"; "Ca. B. brasiliensis"; "Ca. B. carolinensis"; "Ca. B. fulgida"; "Ca. B. pituitae"; "Ca. B. sapporoensis"; "Ca. B. sinica"; "Ca. B. thermoanammoxidans"; "Ca. B. thermophilus"

Genus of bacteria

"Candidatus Brocadia" is a candidatus genus of bacteria, meaning that while it is well-characterized, it has not been grown as a pure culture yet. Due to this, much of what is known about Candidatus species (including Brocadia) has been discovered using culture-independent techniques such as metagenomic sequence analysis.

Some notable species within this genus include the type species, Candidatus Brocadia anammoxidans, along with Candidatus Brocadia sinica and Candidatus Brocadia fulgida. Many of the species in this genus, including those already listed, are capable of anaerobic ammonium oxidation, also known as anammox, an important part of the global nitrogen cycle. Anammox works by converting fixed nitrogen back into N_{2} gas in the atmosphere. Anammox bacteria have a unique, membrane-bound organelle where this anammox process takes place—it is called the anammoxosome.

== Phylogeny ==
The currently accepted taxonomy is based on the List of Prokaryotic names with Standing in Nomenclature (LPSN) and National Center for Biotechnology Information (NCBI). Phylogeny based on 120 marker proteins GTDB 10-RS226.

- "Ca. Brocadia"
  - "Ca. B. sinica" Hu et al. 2010
  - - "Ca. B. sapporoensis" Narita et al. 2017
    - - "Ca. B. carolinensis" corrig. Magrí et al. 2012
      - - "Ca. B. fulgida" Kartal et al. 2004
        - "Ca. B. pituitae" Okubo et al. 2021

== Structure ==
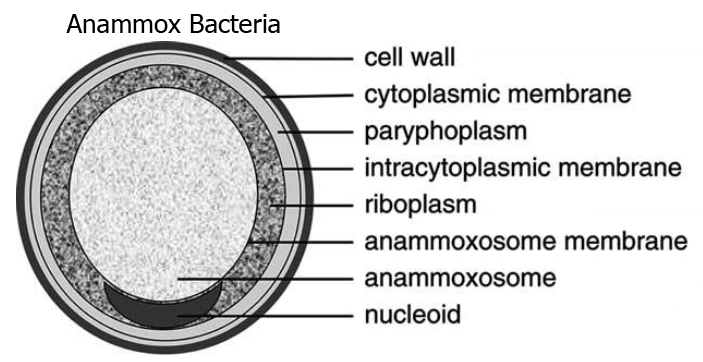
Figure 1. Candidatus Brocadia anammoxidans. This image represents the types species of the Brocadia genus, Candidatus Brocadia anammoxidans. The physical structures and barriers are clearly defined, including the paryphoplasm, riboplasm, and anammoxosome.

Candidatus Brocadia falls under the phylum of Planctomycetota. These bacteria are known for a few distinguishing phenotypic features including cell surface pits (crateriform structures), no present peptidoglycan in the cell wall, compartmentalization, and even budding reproduction rather than binary fission.

Compartmentalization of Ca. Brocadia and anammox bacteria in general are of great interest. They are known to have three main compartments: (1) the paryphoplasm, (2) the riboplasm, and (3) the anammoxosome, as seen in Figure 1.

The paryphoplasm is the outermost compartment of the cell, while the inner most compartment is the riboplasm, which holds the ribosomes and DNA of the cell. The anammoxosome is a membrane-bound component of the cell that does not contain DNA or ribosomes, and it is where the anammox process takes place. This is something that makes anammox bacteria unique, as prokaryotes typically do not have membrane-bound organelles.

Ca. Brocadia, like other anammox bacteria, have integral ladderane lipids embedded in the membranes of their anammoxosome. This helps keep any toxic intermediates from the anammox process—such as hydrazine—from contaminating and damaging the rest of the cell.

== Natural and industrial environments ==
=== Natural ===
These bacteria are found in many natural environments that the anammox process takes place in, and are a major part of the conversion of fixed nitrogen to gaseous nitrogen (N_{2}) that is released into the atmosphere. Anammox bacteria like those falling within Ca. Brocadia were first found in the Black Sea, and subsequently the Arabian Sea, both bodies of water being mostly anoxic and ideal conditions for the anammox process.

=== Industrial ===
The genus, Ca. Brocadia and others are used in industrial waste water treatment plants using sequencing batch reactors, rotating biological contactors, membrane bioreactors, and many others. These reactors are ideal for industrial waste water treatment due to their high sludge retention.

== Notable species ==
Many studies have been performed regarding the physiological attributes of the different anammox bacteria, including their role in the anammox process, how they perform in the anammox process, and other key features that differentiate them from each other. Comparisons between important and notable species are listed here.

=== Candidatus Brocadia anammoxidans ===
Ca. B. anammoxidans is the type species for the genera of Ca. Brocadia, and the first known anammox bacteria. Its name was chosen based on where the bacteria was discovered: 'Brocadia' for the pilot plant it was found in at Gist-brocades, and 'anammoxidans' due to its ability to perform anammox. This was determined after its 16S ribosomal DNA was extracted, amplified, and sequenced, and it was seen to fall within the phylum of Planctomycetota.

=== Candidatus Brocadia sinica ===
Ca. B. sinica was directly compared against its type species in both natural and man-made environments where anammox was performed. Ca. B. sinica was found to have slightly higher growth temperatures, while Ca. B. anammoxidans had slightly lower temperatures, but a wider range. Growth pHs remained similar, with Ca. B. sinica having slightly higher pH requirements. Ca. B. sinica was also shown to have higher resistance to dissolved oxygen in growth media, comparatively. Ca. B. sinica outcompetes Ca. B. anammoxidans in man-made environments with high ammonium and nitrite, but it would be outcompeted in natural environments due to limited ammonium and nitrite availability.

=== Candidatus Brocadia fulgida ===
Ca. B. fulgida has been found to autofluoresce in the right concentrations and aggregations, but not as a single cell. More specifically, an autofluorescent substance has been found surrounding its cells, but has not yet been further identified. Two excitation and emission values were found associated with this autofluorescence, which could suggest more than one compound contributes to this unique trait.

This species is noted to have higher formate and acetate oxidation rates than its type species Ca. B. anammoxidans. It's proposed that Ca. B. fulgida converts acetate to CO_{2} first, and then incorporates the CO_{2} into acetyl-CoA. This is unique because it is much more difficult than the pathway that converts acetate to acetyl-CoA.
