= Anammoxoglobus =

Scientific classification (Candidatus)
- Domain: Bacteria
- Kingdom: Pseudomonadati
- Superphylum: "PVC"
- Phylum: Planctomycetota
- Genus: Anammoxoglobus Kartal et al. 2006

Species
- Anammoxoglobus propionicus

Species of bacterium

Candidatus Anammoxoglobus propionicus is an anammox (anaerobic ammonium oxidation) bacteria that is taxonomically in the phylum of Planctomycetota. Ca. A. propionicus is an interest to many researchers due to its ability to reduce nitrite and oxidize ammonium into nitrogen gas and water.

== Energy source ==
Ca. A. propionicus obtain their energy from chemolithoautotrophic processes. A unique cellular structure that characterizes this species is its anammoxosome. This is where the anaerobic ammonium oxidation reaction occurs. With the following intracellular reaction, they are able to obtain energy and function:

NH_{_{4}}^{^{+}} + NO_{_{2}}^{^{−}} → N_{_{2}} + 2 H_{_{2}}O

== Habitat ==
Anammox bacteria can be found in a wide range of habitats including: soils, hot springs, aquifers, lakes, marshes, and low oxygen zones. Ca. A. propionicus was first identified in laboratory-scale bioreactor in the presence of ammonium and propionate during an experiment in 2006. Since then it has been enriched in other experiments.

== Research and interactions with humans and the environment ==
Anammox processes are used in wastewater treatment applications and can help with the removal of ammonium in wastewater. Ca. A. propionicus has a competitive advantage in ammonium-limited natural ecosystems since they can reduce nitrate and/or nitrite to ammonium. Although anammox bacteria are found in a wide variety of environments, it is not common that multiple anammox bacteria co-exist.

Anammox bacteria are believed to be responsible for up to 50% loss of inorganic nitrogen in the oceans. This makes them of interest to researchers to better understand global nutrient cycling.

A 2014 experiment enriched Ca, A. propionicus within a sample of sludge from a landfill leachate anaerobic treatment system. Researchers started with an enrichment amount of 1.8 ± 0.6% Ca. A. propionicus, and after 481 days the observed fluorescence in situ hybridization results showed an enrichment amount of 65 ± 5%. During the process Ca. A. propionicus removed ammonium (70 mg-N/L) and nitrite (90 mg-N/L) at a stable rate, and the total nitrogen removal efficiency was 95%.
