= Ladderane =

Organic molecule containing two or more fused cyclobutane rings

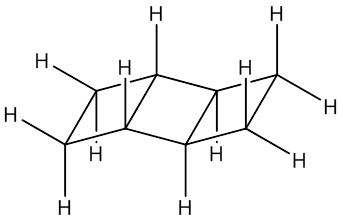
Simple ladderane structure

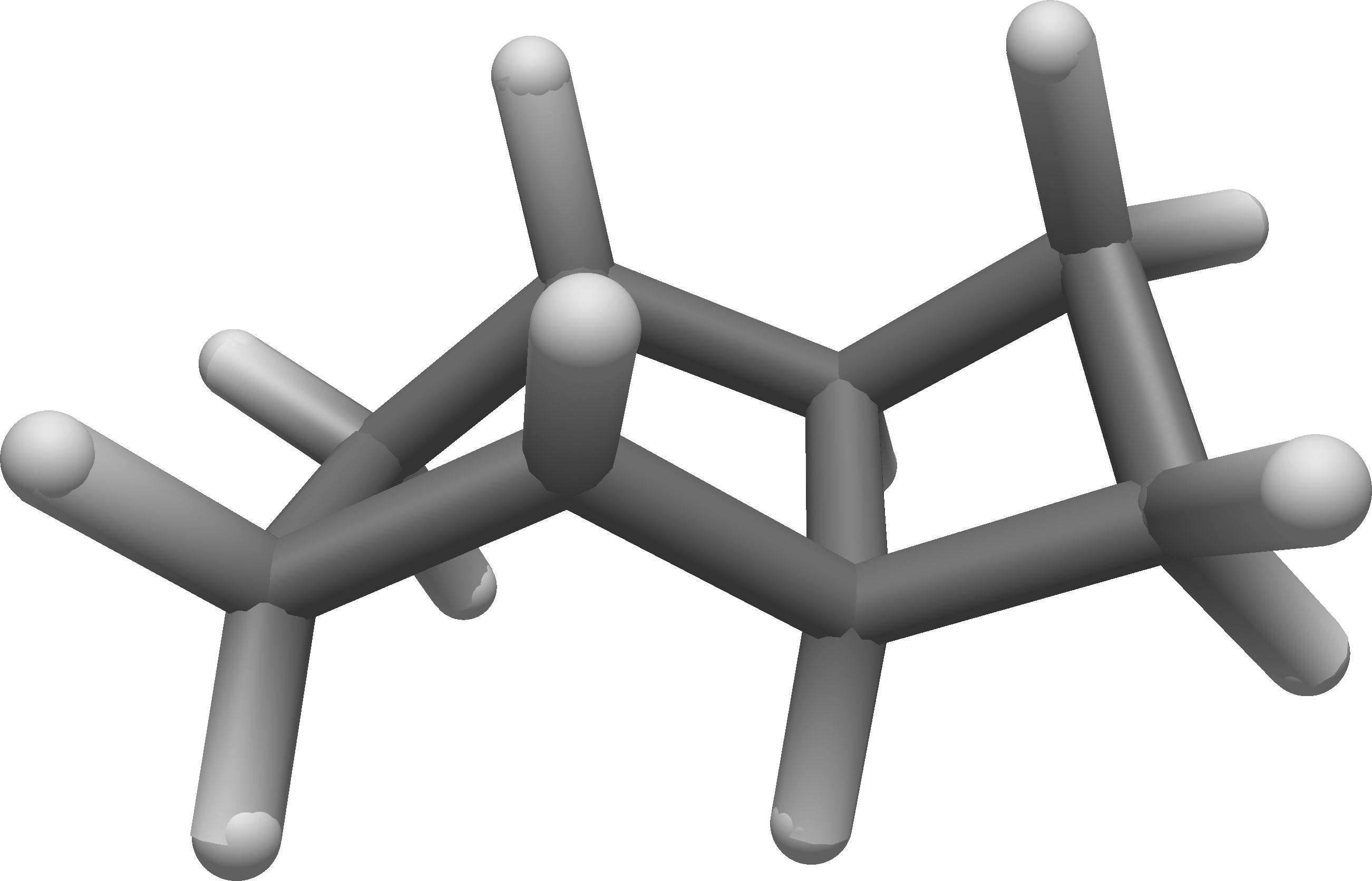
A licorice model of the chemical structure of the 3-ladderane molecule

In chemistry, a ladderane is an organic molecule containing two or more fused cyclobutane rings. The name arises from the resemblance of a series of fused cyclobutane rings to a ladder. Numerous synthetic approaches have been developed for the synthesis of ladderane compounds of various lengths. The mechanisms often involve [2 + 2] photocycloadditions, a useful reaction for creating strained 4-membered rings. Naturally occurring ladderanes have been identified as major components of the anammoxosome membrane of the anammox bacteria, phylum Planctomycetota.

== Nomenclature ==
=== Chain length ===
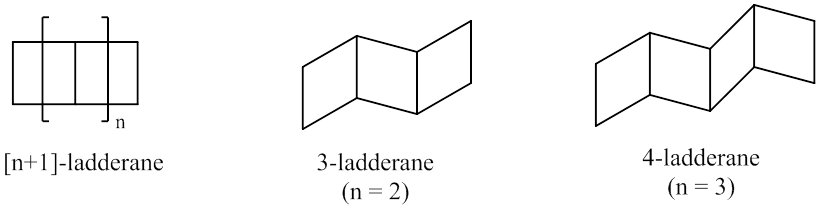
Ladderane nomenclature

Synthetic approaches have yielded ladderanes of varying lengths. A classification system has been developed to describe ladderanes based on the number of consecutive rings. The length of the ladderane is described by the number in brackets that precedes the word "ladderane". This is equal to the number of bonds shared by two cyclobutanes (n) plus 1.

A ladderane of 3 or more units can connect in a circle, forming a band, which can also be considered to be two interconnected parallel cycloalkane rings. These are called prismanes.

=== Stereochemistry ===
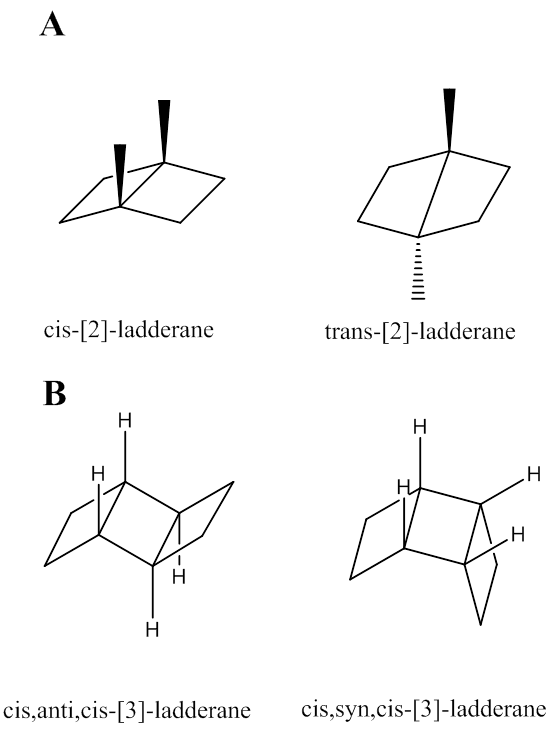
A: cis- and trans-[2]-ladderane B: anti- and syn-[3]-ladderane

Ladderanes have two types of stereochemical relationships. One describes the relative arrangement of hydrogen atoms at the fusion between two cyclobutane rings. These hydrogen atoms can be in either the cis- or trans- configuration. Trans-ladderanes have not been synthesized due to the ring strain in these compounds.

The second stereochemical relationship describes the orientation of three consecutive cyclobutane rings, and therefore is only relevant to ladderanes of n ≥ 2. The two outer rings can be on the same face (syn-) or on the opposite face (anti-) of the center ring.

== Synthesis ==
Various synthetic methods have been used for the laboratory synthesis of ladderane compounds. The three major approaches are (1) dimerization of polyene precursors, (2) the stepwise addition, one or two rings at a time, (3) and oligomerization. Several examples of ladderane synthesis are outlined below.

=== Dimerization of cyclobutadiene ===
The dimerization of two cyclobutadienes can generate both the syn and anti ladderane products depending on the reaction conditions. The first step in forming the syn product involves the generation of 1,3-cyclobutadiene by treatment of cis-3,4-dichlorocyclobutene with sodium amalgam. The reactant passes through a metalated intermediate before forming 1,3-cyclobutadiene, which can then dimerize to form the syn-diene. Hydrogenation of the double bonds will form the saturated syn-[3]-ladderane.

To generate the anti product, cis-3,4-dichlorocyclobutene is treated with lithium amalgam. The lithium derivative undergoes a C-C coupling reaction to produce the open dimeric structure. This intermediate reacts to form the anti-diene, which can be hydrogenated to form the final anti-[3]-ladderane product.

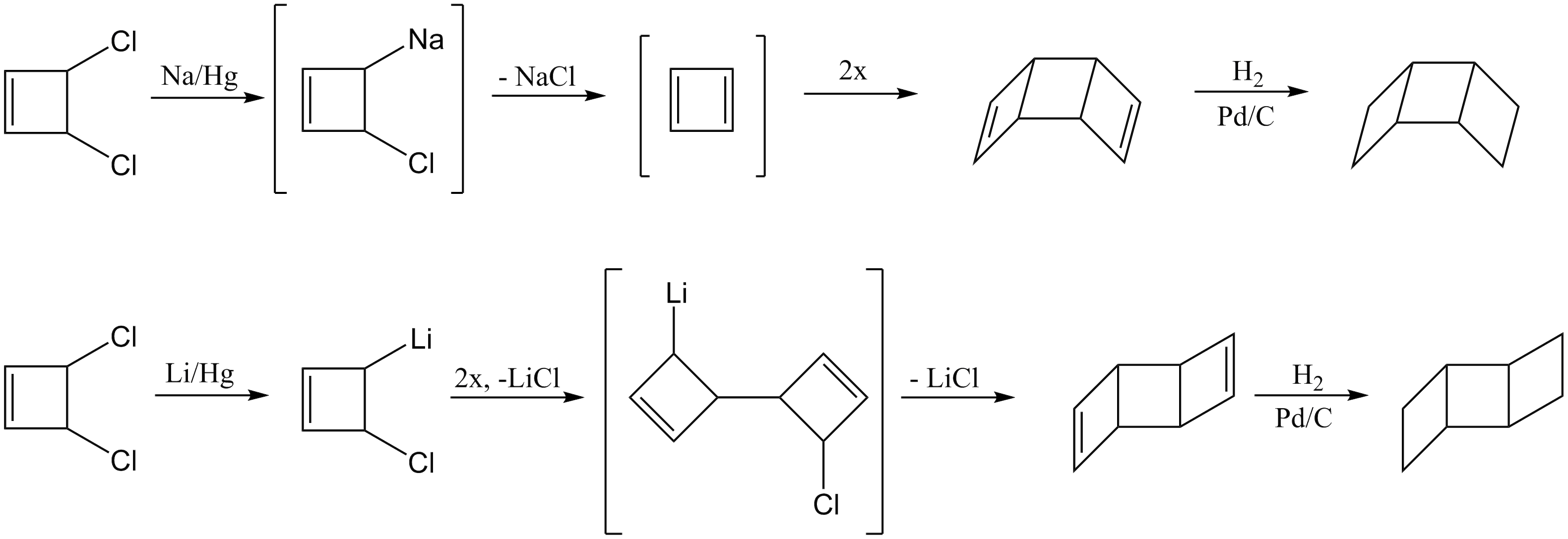
Syntheses of ladderanes through cyclization

=== Synthesis of a [4]-ladderdiene ===
A different synthetic approach developed by Martin and coworkers has allowed for the synthesis of [4]-ladderanes. The initial step involves the formation of a [2]-ladderane from the addition of two equivalents of maleic anhydride with acetylene. The remaining two rings are formed from the Ramberg–Bäcklund ring contraction.

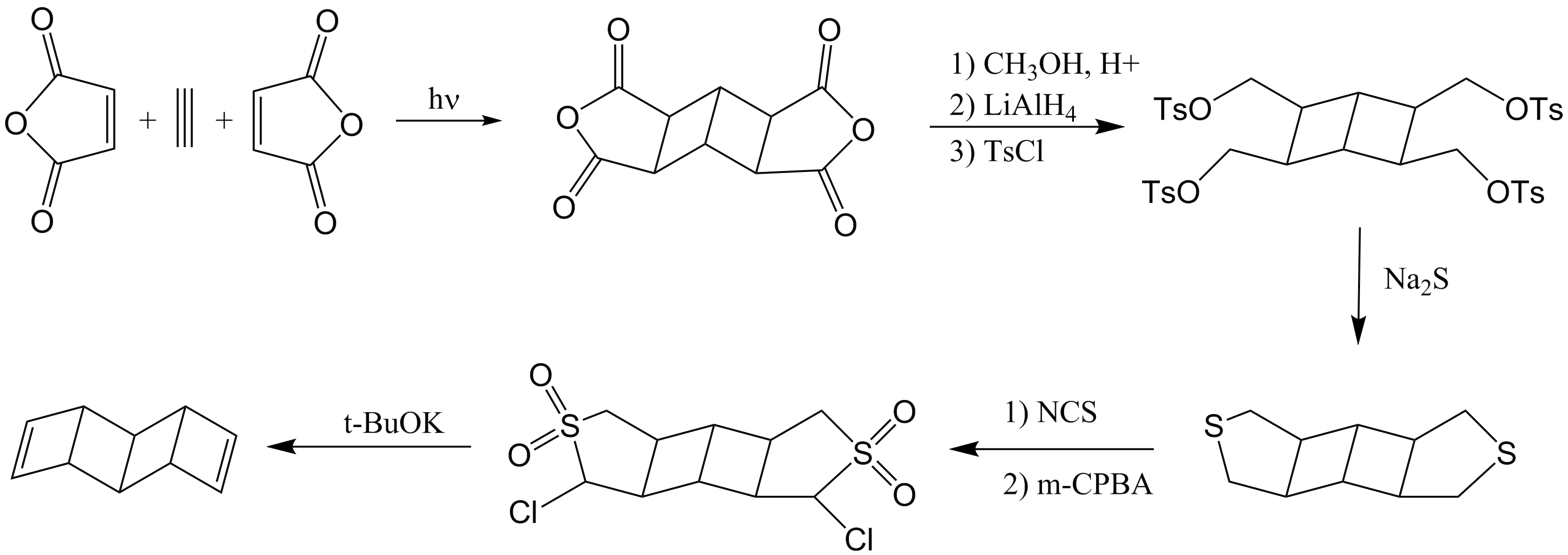
Synthetic pathway to a [4]-ladderane

=== Synthesis of long-chain ladderanes ===
Ladderanes with lengths up to 13 cyclobutane rings have been synthesized by Mehta and coworkers. This process involves the in situ generation of dicarbomethoxycyclobutadiene from its Fe(CO)_{3} complex at low temperatures with the addition of ceric(IV) ammonium nitrate (CAN). Generation of the butadiene rapidly forms a mixture of [n]-ladderanes of lengths up to n = 13 with an overall yield of 55%. All of the ladderanes synthesized through this method have one cis,syn,cis structure. This may be a result of the initial dimerization of two cyclobutadienes which preferably forms the syn product, shown below. The further dimerization only produces the anti product due to steric factors.

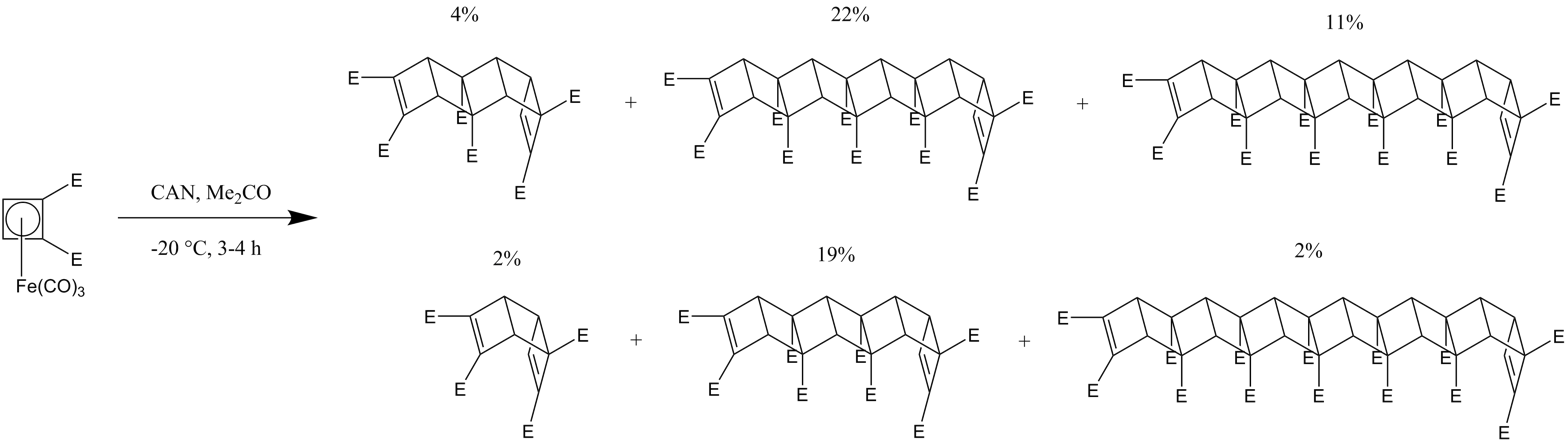
Synthesis of long-chain ladderanes. E = CO_{2}Me

=== Dimerization of polyene precursors ===
In these reactions, ladderanes are formed from multiple [2 + 2] photocycloadditions between the double bonds of two polyenes. A complication that arises from this approach is the reaction of the precursors through alternative, more favorable photoexcitation routes. These side reactions are prevented by the addition of a chemical spacer unit that holds the two polyenes parallel to each other, only allowing [2 + 2] cycloadditions to occur.

A common spacer used in these reactions is the [2.2]paracyclophane system. This is sufficiently rigid and can hold the polyene tails in close enough proximity for the cycloadditions to occur.

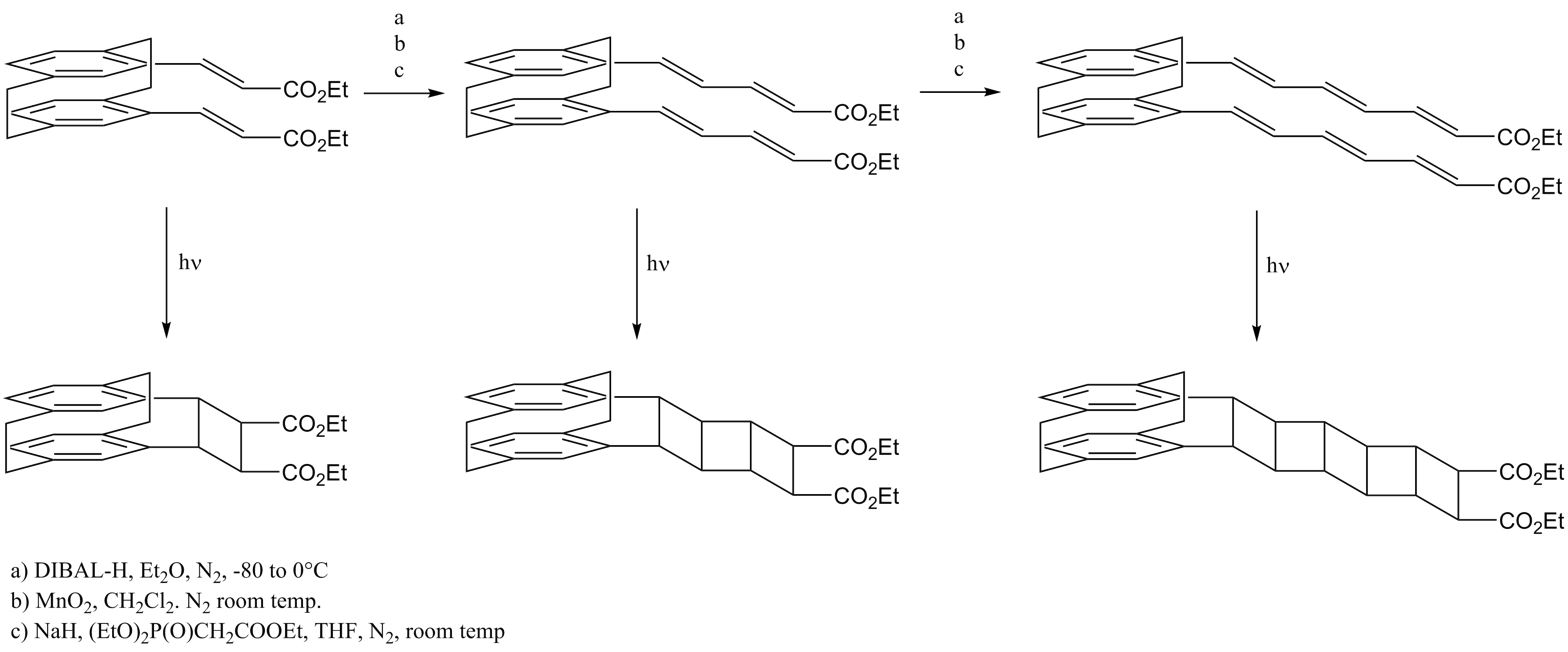
Synthesis of ladderanes through the dimerization of polyene precursors

MacGillivray and colleagues have demonstrated that a supramolecular approach to covalent synthesis in the organized, solvent-free environment of the solid state can provide a solution to the problem of organizing two polyenes for an intramolecular reaction to give a ladderane. Specifically, by taking an approach to control reactivity in solids by using molecules that serve as linear templates, they have demonstrated the utility of cocrystallization of resorcinol (1,3-benzenediol), or a derivative, with an all-trans-bis(4-pyridyl)poly-m-ene (4-pyr-poly-m-ene) produces a four-component molecular assembly, 2(resorcinol)·2(4-pyr-poly-m-ene), in which each resorcinol preorganizes, through two O—H···N hydrogen-bonding interactions, two poly-m-enes for [2+2] photoaddition. The two polyenes are positioned by the templates such that the C=C bonds of the olefins lie parallel and separated by < 4.2 Å, a position suitable for the photoreaction. UV irradiation of the solid produces the targeted [n]ladderane, with the C=C bonds reacting to form the fused cyclobutane framework. Broadband UV-irradiation of two such hydrogen-bonded, four-component supramolecular assemblies furnishes the corresponding ladderanes stereospecifically and in quantitative yield in gram quantities.

== Biological background ==
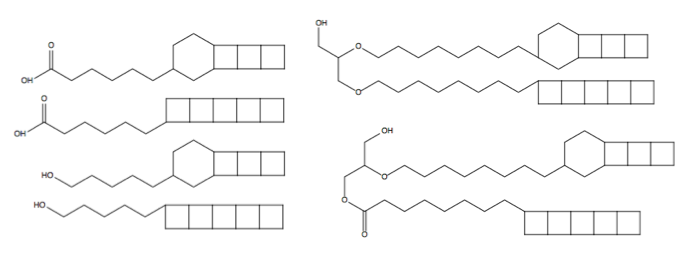
Ladderane lipids present in anammoxosomes

Ladderanes were first identified in a rare group of anaerobic ammonium oxidizing (anammox) bacteria belonging to the phylum Planctomycetota. These bacteria sequester the catabolic anammox reactions to intracellular compartments called anammoxosomes. The anammox process involves the oxidation of ammonium to nitrogen gas with nitrite as the final electron acceptor. Intermediates in this process are two highly toxic compounds, hydrazine (N_{2}H_{4}) and hydroxylamine (NH_{2}OH). The oxidation process involves the generation of a proton gradient on the intracytoplasmic face of the anammoxosome. Dissipation of the proton gradient is coupled to the phosphorylation of ADP through membrane-bound ATPases.

Anammoxosomes are enriched in the ladderane lipids shown at right. Analysis of the anammoxosome membranes from the bacterial species Brocadia anammoxidans and Kuenenia stuttgartiensis has revealed that ladderanes constitute more than 50% of membrane lipids. The high abundance of ladderane lipids in the anammoxosome results in an exceptionally dense membrane with reduced permeability. The reduced permeability may decrease the passive diffusion of protons across the membrane that would dissipate the electrochemical gradient. This would be especially detrimental to anammox bacteria, due to the relatively slow anammox metabolism. The decreased permeability has also been hypothesized to sequester the highly toxic and mutagenic intermediates, hydrazine and hydroxylamine, which can readily diffuse through biomembranes. The loss of these key intermediates would damage key cellular components such as DNA, as well as reduce the catabolic efficiency of the cell.

=== Synthesis of ladderane lipids ===
A naturally occurring [5]-ladderane lipid, named pentacycloanammoxic acid, has been synthesized by Corey and coworkers. The first step in this reaction involves bromination followed by cyclization of cyclooctatetraene to form a cyclohexadiene. This cyclohexadiene is trapped by dibenzyl azodicarboxylate. Functional group modifications are made to produce a cyclobutane which is elaborated through a [2+2] photocycloaddition with a cyclopentenone to produce a second cyclobutane ring. Protection of the carbonyl group, followed by a N_{2} extrusion reaction, yields two more fused cyclobutane rings. The final cyclobutane is formed by a Wolff rearrangement, and the alkyl chain is installed by a Wittig olefination.

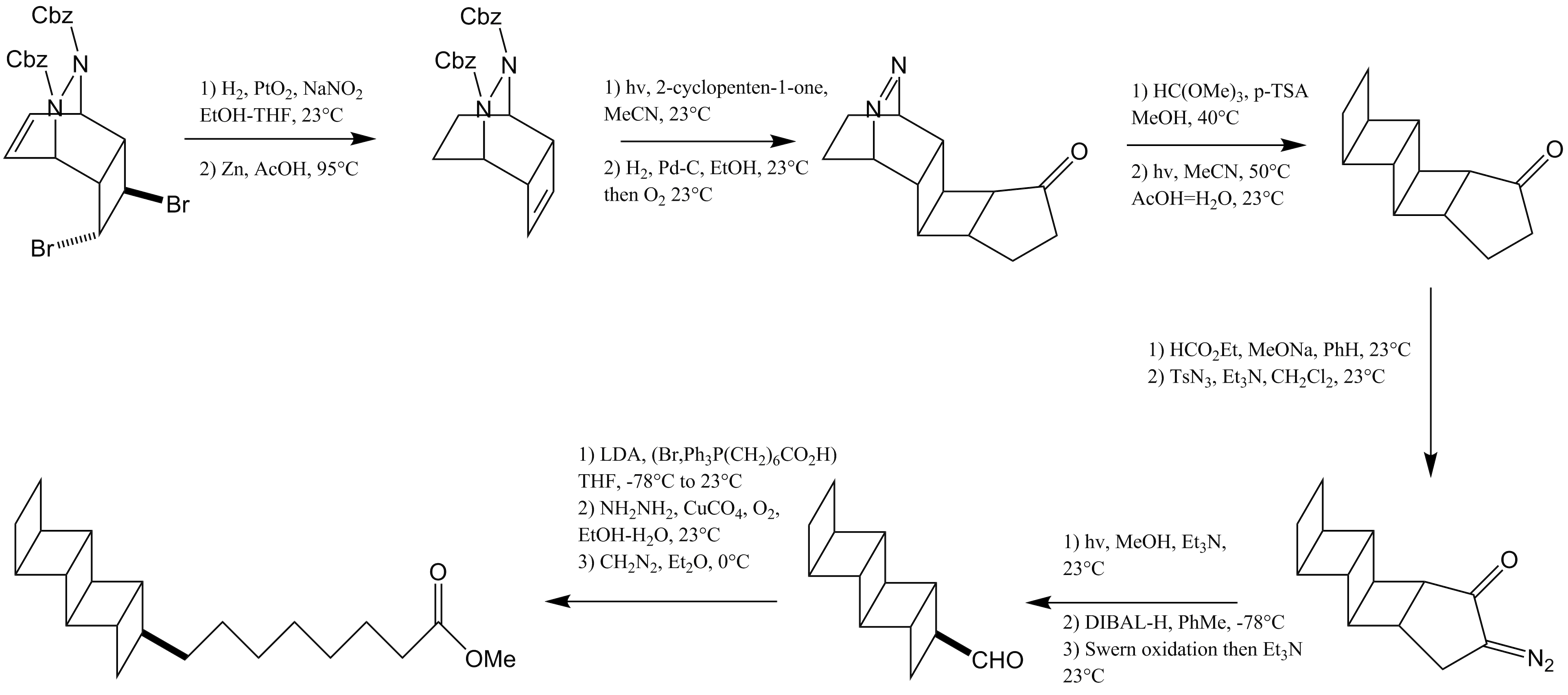
Synthesis of [5]-ladderane lipid pentacycloannamoxic acid

In 2016, Burns and co-workers at Stanford University reported an enantioselective synthesis of both the [3]- and [5]-ladderane lipid tails and their incorporation into a full phosphatidylcholine lipid. Both routes leverage a small [2]-ladderene building block bicyclo[2.2.0]hexene prepared by a Ramberg–Bäcklund reaction. The route to a [5]-ladderane-containing fatty acid involves dimerization of this intermediate to form an all-anti [5]-ladderane hydrocarbon. C–H chlorination by a manganese porphyrin catalyst and subsequent elimination introduces unsaturation to produce a [5]-ladderene. Hydroboration and a Zweifel reaction install the linear alkyl group.

The route to a [3]-ladderane fatty alcohol begins with a [2+2] photocycloaddition between a brominated benzoquinone and bicyclo[2.2.0]hexene. Elimination of H–Br and addition of an organozinc compound installs the alkyl alcohol. A hydrazine-mediated deoxygenation reaction followed by hydrogenation with Crabtree's catalyst effects reduction to the cyclohexane ring.

== See also ==
- Dewar benzene, parent compound of a class of 2-ladderane-like molecules containing cyclobutenes
