= Atabeyarchaeia =

Scientific classification (Candidatus)
- Domain: Archaea
- Kingdom: Promethearchaeati
- Phylum: Promethearchaeota
- Class: "Atabeyarchaeia" Valentin-Alvarado et al., 2024
- Order: "Atabeyarchaeales" Valentin-Alvarado et al., 2024
- Family: "Atabeyarchaeaceae" Valentin-Alvarado et al., 2024
- Genus: "Ca. Atabeyarchaeum" Valentin-Alvarado et al., 2024
- Species: "Ca. A. deiterrae"

Binomial name
- "Candidatus Atabeyarchaeum deiterrae" Valentin-Alvarado et al., 2024

Candidate class of archaea

Atabeyarchaeia is a class of Asgard archaea that consists of only one named species, Ca. Atabeyarchaeum deiterrae.

== Phylogeny ==
Phylogeny of Asgard archaea (per GTDB release 11-RS232):

- Promethearchaeota
  - - "Asgardarchaeia"
    - "Thorarchaeia"
  - - "Atabeyarchaeia"
    - - - - "Baldrarchaeia"
          - "Jordiarchaeia"
        - - "Odinarchaeia"
          - - "Hermodarchaeia"
            - "Promethearchaeia"
      - - "Borrarchaeia"
        - - "Wukongarchaeia"
          - - "Njordarchaeia"
            - "Heimdallarchaeia" (incl. eukaryotes)
