= Njordarchaeia =

Scientific classification (Candidatus)
- Domain: Archaea
- Kingdom: Promethearchaeati
- Phylum: Promethearchaeota
- Class: "Njordarchaeia"; Xie et al., 2022
- Order: "Njordarchaeales"; Xie et al., 2022

Families
- "Njordarchaeaceae"; "Panguiarchaeaceae"

Candidate class of Asgard archea

Njordarchaeia is a class of Asgard archaea that consists of two named species, Ca. Njordarchaeum guaymasense and Ca. Panguiarchaeum symbiosum.

== Classification ==
Phylogeny of Asgard archaea (per GTDB release 11-RS232):

- Promethearchaeota
  - - "Asgardarchaeia"
    - "Thorarchaeia"
  - - "Atabeyarchaeia"
    - - - - "Baldrarchaeia"
          - "Jordiarchaeia"
        - - "Odinarchaeia"
          - - "Hermodarchaeia"
            - "Promethearchaeia"
      - - "Borrarchaeia"
        - - "Wukongarchaeia"
          - - "Njordarchaeia"
            - "Heimdallarchaeia" (incl. eukaryotes)

Internal taxonomy:

- Class "Njordarchaeia" Xie et al., 2022
  - Order "Njordarchaeales" Xie et al., 2022
    - Family "Njordarchaeaceae" Xie et al., 2022
      - Genus "Ca. Njordarchaeum" Xie et al., 2022
        - Species "Ca. N. guaymasense" Xie et al., 2022
    - Family "Panguiarchaeaceae" Qu et al., 2023
      - Genus "Ca. Panguiarchaeum" Qu et al., 2023
        - Species "Ca. P. symbiosum" Qu et al., 2023
