= Wukongarchaeia =

Scientific classification (Candidatus)
- Domain: Archaea
- Kingdom: Promethearchaeati
- Phylum: Promethearchaeota
- Class: "Wukongarchaeia"; Liu et al., 2021
- Order: "Wukongarchaeales"; Liu et al., 2021
- Family: "Wukongarchaeaceae"; Liu et al., 2021
- Genus: "Ca. Wukongarchaeum"; Liu et al., 2021
- Species: "Ca. W. yapense"

Binomial name
- "Candidatus Wukongarchaeum yapense" corrig. Liu et al., 2021

Synonyms
- "Ca. Wukongarchaeum yapensis" (sic) Liu et al., 2021

Candidate class of archaea

Wukongarchaeia (named after Sun Wukong) is a class of Asgard archaea that consists of only one named species, Ca. Wukongarchaeum yapense.

Phylogeny of Asgard archaea (per GTDB release 11-RS232):

- Promethearchaeota
  - - "Asgardarchaeia"
    - "Thorarchaeia"
  - - "Atabeyarchaeia"
    - - - - "Baldrarchaeia"
          - "Jordiarchaeia"
        - - "Odinarchaeia"
          - - "Hermodarchaeia"
            - "Promethearchaeia"
      - - "Borrarchaeia"
        - - "Wukongarchaeia"
          - - "Njordarchaeia"
            - "Heimdallarchaeia" (incl. eukaryotes)
