= Hermodarchaeia =

Scientific classification (Candidatus)
- Domain: Archaea
- Kingdom: Promethearchaeati
- Phylum: Promethearchaeota
- Class: "Hermodarchaeia"
- Order: "Hermodarchaeales"
- Family: "Hermodarchaeaceae"
- Genus: "Ca. Hermodarchaeum"
- Species: "Ca. H. yapense"

Binomial name
- "Candidatus Hermodarchaeum yapense" corrig. Liu et al., 2021

Synonyms
- "Ca. Hermodarchaeum yapensis" Liu et al., 2021

Candidate class of archaea

Hermodarchaeia is a class of Asgard archaea that consists of only one named species, Ca. Hermodarchaeum yapense.

Phylogeny of Asgard archaea (per GTDB release 11-RS232):

- Promethearchaeota
  - - "Asgardarchaeia"
    - "Thorarchaeia"
  - - "Atabeyarchaeia"
    - - - - "Baldrarchaeia"
          - "Jordiarchaeia"
        - - "Odinarchaeia"
          - - "Hermodarchaeia"
            - "Promethearchaeia"
      - - "Borrarchaeia"
        - - "Wukongarchaeia"
          - - "Njordarchaeia"
            - "Heimdallarchaeia" (incl. eukaryotes)
