= Borrarchaeia =

Scientific classification
- Domain: Archaea
- Kingdom: Promethearchaeati
- Phylum: Promethearchaeota
- Class: "Borrarchaeia"; Liu et al., 2021

Orders
- "Sifarchaeales"; "Borrarchaeales"

Synonyms
- "Sifarchaeia" Sun et al., 2021

Class of Asgard archea

Borrarchaeia (or Sifarchaeia) is a class of Asgard archaea.

== Classification ==
Phylogeny of Asgard archaea (per GTDB release 11-RS232):

- Promethearchaeota
  - - "Asgardarchaeia"
    - "Thorarchaeia"
  - - "Atabeyarchaeia"
    - - - - "Baldrarchaeia"
          - "Jordiarchaeia"
        - - "Odinarchaeia"
          - - "Hermodarchaeia"
            - "Promethearchaeia"
      - - "Borrarchaeia"
        - - "Wukongarchaeia"
          - - "Njordarchaeia"
            - "Heimdallarchaeia" (incl. eukaryotes)

Internal taxonomy according to GTDB release 11-RS232 (15th April 2026):

- Class "Sifarchaeia" Sun et al., 2021 (syn. "Borrarchaeia" Liu et al., 2021)
  - Order "Sifarchaeales" Sun et al., 2021
    - Family "Sifarchaeaceae" Sun et al., 2021
      - Genus "Ca. Sifarchaeum" corrig. Farag et al. 2021
        - Species "Ca. S. subterraneum" corrig. Farag et al. 2021
  - Order "Borrarchaeales" Liu et al., 2021
    - Family "Borrarchaeaceae" Liu et al., 2021
      - Genus "Ca. Borrarchaeum" Liu et al., 2021
        - Species "Ca. B. weybense" Sun et al., 2021
        - Species "Ca. B. yapensis" (syn. "Ca. Borrarchaeum yapense" corrig. Liu et al. 2021)
        - Species "Ca. B. marinoarchaea" (syn. "Ca. Sifarchaeum marinarchaeum" corrig. Farag et al. 2021)
