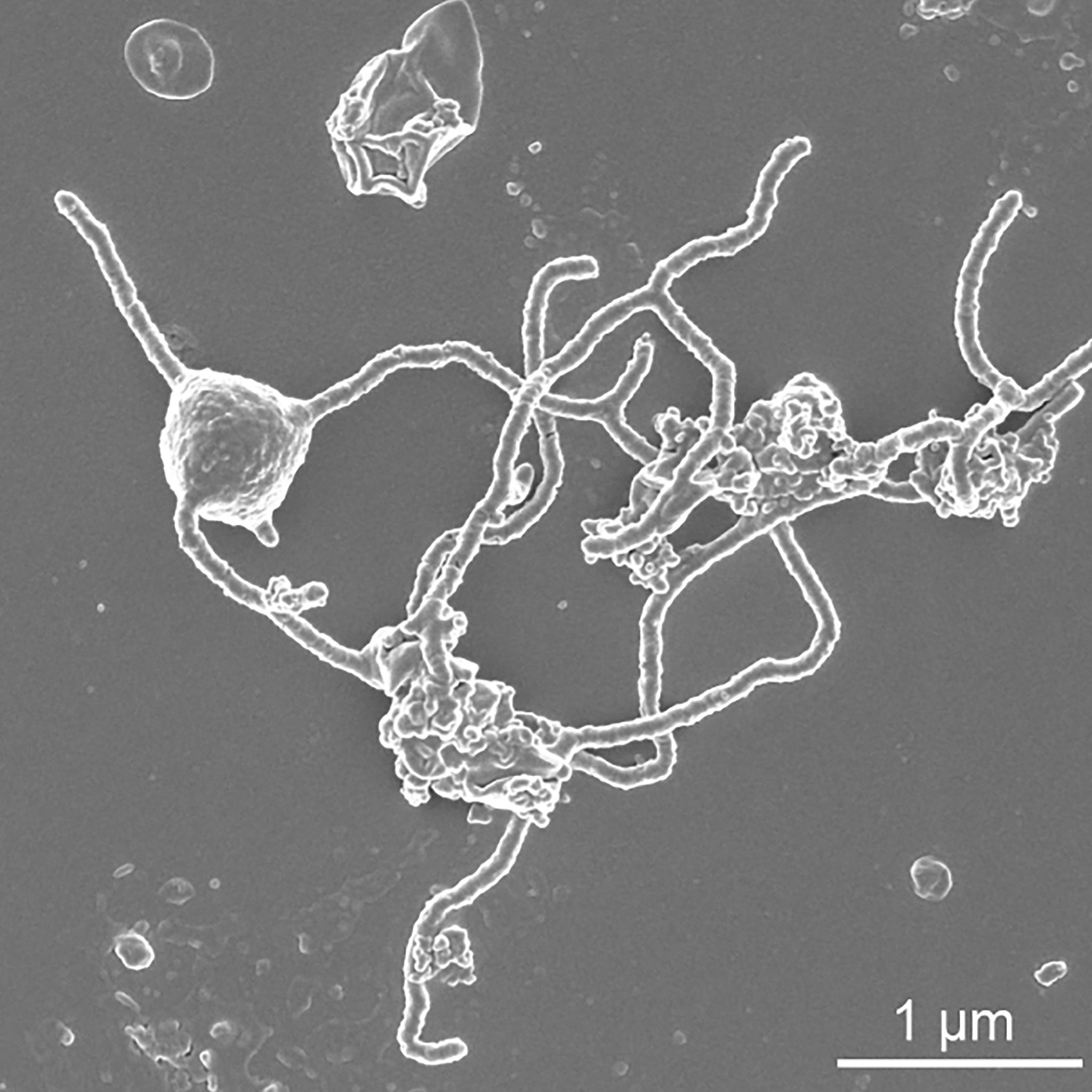
- Promethearchaeum syntrophicum seen under scanning electron microscope.

Scientific classification
- Domain: Archaea
- Kingdom: Promethearchaeati
- Phylum: Promethearchaeota
- Class: Promethearchaeia
- Order: Promethearchaeales
- Family: Promethearchaeaceae
- Genus: Promethearchaeum; Imachi et al., 2024
- Species: P. syntrophicum

Binomial name
- Promethearchaeum syntrophicum Imachi et al., 2024

Synonyms
- "Ca. Prometheoarchaeum" Imachi et al., 2020; "Ca. Prometheoarchaeum syntrophicum" Imachi et al., 2020; "Prometheoarchaeales" Pallen, Rodriguez-R and Alikhan, 2022; "Prometheoarchaeaceae" Pallen, Rodriguez-R and Alikhan, 2022

= Promethearchaeum =

Genus of archaea

Species-level cladogram of all named species within the order Promethearchaeales (topology based on Nobs et al.,2026).

Promethearchaeum is a genus of archaea discovered from the deep-sea sediments of the Pacific Ocean at the coast of Japan. Described in 2020 as a single species, "Candidatus Prometheoarchaeum syntrophicum", it took 12 years for the archeal samples to be successfully cultured (grown in laboratory). Named after the Greek mythological god, Prometheus, the correct scientific name became Promethearchaeum (dropping the "o" according to the rules of the International Code of Nomenclature of Prokaryotes) and the species, Promethearchaeum syntrophicum.

Discovered by a team of Japanese biologists led by Hiroyuki Imachi and Masaru Konishi Nobu, the archaea were found to constitute a distinct group from other recognised groups so that a new kingdom Promethearchaeati was created. Another archaeon "Ca. Lokiarchaeum", which was described in 2015 and originally assigned to the phylum "Lokiarchaeota", was reassigned to the kingdom Promethearchaeati alongside P. syntrophicum. P. syntrophicum became the first successfully laboratory-cultured Asgard archaea.

For its simple cellular structure and function, and dependency on other organisms by symbiosis, P. syntrophicum is described (by the discoverer Hiroyuki Imachi) as "the least complete living thing ever found." With its symbiotic lifestyle with other archaea and bacteria, P. syntrophicum is taken as an example of syntrophic process of symbiogenesis in the early stages of eukaryogenesis and evolutionary root of eukaryotes. The discovery was lauded as "moon landing for microbial ecology."

== Discovery ==
Japanese researchers at the Japan Agency for Marine-Earth Science and Technology (JAMSTEC) in Yokosuka started a project of exploring microbes of the Pacific Ocean in 2006. A team led by Hiroyuki Imachi was hoping to find methane-metabolising microbes that could potentially be used to degrade sewage. They first explored the sediments at about 2,500 metres (8,200 ft) depths off the south coast of Shikoku island, called the Nankai Trench. The trench had methane vents that suited their plan. Using submersible research vessel, they kept on collecting and analysing the oceanic muds for 10 years, and identified different types of microbes.

In 2015, Swedish biologists at Uppsala University, led by Thijs Ettema reported a discovery of a new group of archaea from the Arctic Ocean. They gave the name "Ca. Lokiarchaeum" (as a phylum "Lokiarchaeota") as they were found at a hydrothermal vent called Loki's castle. Genetic studies indicate that these archaea are at the core of the origin and evolution of eukaryotes. Subsequent discoveries of "Ca. Lokiarchaeum"-like archaea followed the Norse god-naming pattern, such that "Thorarchaeota", "Odinarchaeota" and "Heimdallarchaeota" which led to creation of the superphylum "Asgard", and the common collective name "Asgard archaea". It was then that Nobu and his team realised some of their microbes were very similar to the Asgard archaea.

The AIST team knew that it was important to identify their microbes by growing and microscopically examining in the laboratory, as it became a general rule that prokaryotic (bacteria and archaea) species must be grown (in pure culture) and sampled in a laboratory for complete acceptance as a correct identification. Masaru Konishi Nobu and his colleagues at National Institute of Advanced Industrial Science and Technology (AIST) joined in. Archaea are difficult to grow under normal laboratory conditions, as they live only in extreme environments, such as in toxic, acidic, salty, and hot spring environments. The Japanese archaea also died the moment they were isolated from the sediments, while other microbes multiplied.

=== Identification ===
It took five years to successfully isolate live archaea from the sediments, another five-and-half years to complete the culture, and another three years to analyse the culture. In January 2020, Nobu and Imachi teams published their experiment in Nature as "Isolation of an archaeon at the prokaryote–eukaryote interface", giving the name of the archaea "Ca. Prometheoarchaeum syntrophicum". Even before it was published, scientists remarked the discovery as "paper of the year" and the "moon landing for microbial ecology." It became the first Asgard archaea isolated and grown in pure culture. The origin of the name was explained as:

"Prometheoarchaeum, Prometheus (Greek): a Greek god who shaped humans out of mud and gave them the ability to create fire; archaeum from archaea (Greek): an ancient life. The genus name is an analogy between the evolutionary relationship this organism and the origin of eukaryotes, and the involvement of Prometheus in the origin of humans from sediments and the acquisition of an unprecedented oxygen-driven energy-harnessing ability. The species name, syntrophicum, syn (Greek): together with; trephein (Greek) nourish; icus (Latin) pertaining to. The species name refers to the syntrophic substrate utilization property of this strain."

By then, the International Code of Nomenclature of Prokaryotes developed specific rules, such as the use of Latin and Greek alphabets in compound words, such combining Greek words with -o- and Latin with -i-. However, if the second word starts with a vowel, the connecting vowel should be omitted. Thus, the connecting -o- in "Ca. Prometheoarchaeum" was not correct and the correction, "Promethearchaeum" was made in 2021. The complete correct name Promethearchaeum syntrophicum, along with the full classification from kingdom to genus, was published in 2024 in the International Journal of Systematic and Evolutionary Microbiology, an official publication of the International Committee on Systematics of Prokaryotes.

== Culture method ==
Microbes from the Nankai Trench consisted of different organisms capable of living in a methane-rich environment. The Japanese scientists created a separate bioreactor chamber that injected a continuous flow of methane. The complete technique was published in 2022. Oxygen was removed from the chamber and the samples were incubated along with polyurethane sponges at 10°C. The microbes were fed anaerobic artificial seawater and methane. The archaea survived under these conditions, but so did many bacteria. After one year, a faint turbid mass developed that contained a mixture of microbes, including bacteria. To remove unwanted bacteria, different antibiotics were added so that the remaining microbes were mostly archaea. After antibiotic treatment, the sample was genetically screened for the small subunit (SSU) rRNA gene, which indicated the presence of different archaea species including "Ca. Lokiarchaeum".

One group of archaea, designated MK-D1, stood out. Although genetically related to the Asgard archaea, it was distinct. The filtered sample containing it was grown separately using different amino acids and powdered milk, which increased its growth rate. After several months, a pure culture was produced. Still, MK-D1 was not alone; it could grow only with its partner archaea, Methanogenium, and a bacterium, Halodesulfovibrio. These microbes share their nutrients and survive in syntrophy, the etymology of the species name for MK-D1, P. syntrophicum.

== Structure ==
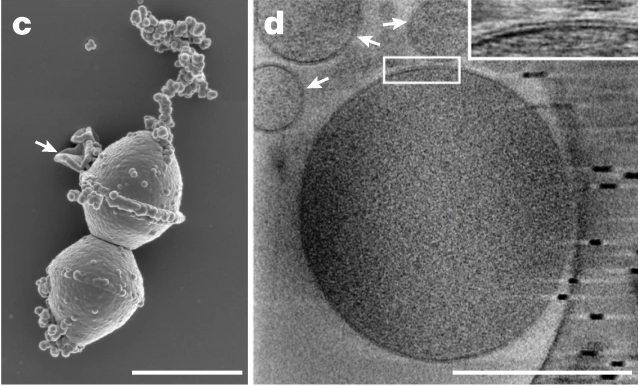
Promethearchaeum (MK-D1) cells. Left: Dividing cell. Right: Membrane vesicles associated with the cell membrane.

P. syntrophicum is one of a few archaea whose structures are known in detail and with extraordinary features, so different from previously known archaea that Ettema, on first seeing the report, perceived it as a "sort of an organism from outer space." It has no complex structural components for which Imachi remarked it as "the least complete living thing ever found." The main cell is rounded in shape but gives off multiple thread-like projections, much like tentacles on marine invertebrates, some of them highly branched. Yet, like other archaea, it has no visible nucleus or any membrane-bound organelle. Its main cell measures about 550 nanometres (0.55 μm) in diameter. Its tentacle-like arms constantly change sizes depending on their activity, and on average are 95 nanometres (0.095 μm) thick and 5,000 nanometres (5.0 μm) long. It is generally associated with free and attached membrane vesicles on its surface that could be used for transferring nutrients and cell metabolites to other microbes. While it has weak metabolic systems, it exhibits high heterotrophic amino acid catabolism. It is strictly anaerobic (oxygenless) and requires reducing agents such as sodium sulphide and cysteine–hydrochloride.

=== Genome ===
The genome of P. syntrophicum contains eukaryotic signature genes that are absent in bacteria, indicating its close relationship with eukaryotes. With a size of 4.46 Mbp, it encodes 3831 predicted proteins, one copy of each of the 5S, 16S, and 23S rRNA genes, and 46 tRNAs. It has 80 eukaryotic signature genes, some of which codes for highly specific proteins such as cytoskeleton- and membrane-remodeling proteins (like actin, ESCRTIII, small GTP-binding domain proteins). It also encodes common bacterial-eukaryotic enzymes like one hydrogenase (nickel-iron hydrogenase MvhADG–HdrABC) and formate dehydrogenase (molybdopterin-dependent FdhA), which are key but partial components in hydrogen and formate (involved in methane metabolism) synthesis. There are also genes that encode for proteins used in the degradation of ten amino acids. The genes and proteins in N-linked glycosylation pathway was revealed in a separate experiment that showed several unique features not seen in other organisms.

== Importance ==
=== Symbiosis ===
One unusual feature of P. syntrophicum is its lack of energy synthesis by itself, while other archaea normally metabolise external nutrients to produce energy. By lacking an energy-producing system, it cannot grow or reproduce on its own. In culture, the archaea always mingled with other microbes like methane-producing archaea (Methanogenium) and sulfur-reducing bacterium, Halodesulfovibrio. It was then found that P. syntrophicum depends on these microbes for cellular energy production, and in return it supplies hydrogen for the microbes which required the gas for energetic metabolism. The amino acid (food) is provided by the neighbouring microbes.

Specifically P. syntrophicum can metabolise only ten different amino acids and small peptides, but only in the presence of the other microbes. Thus, the microbes form a network of symbiosis. Even though, the exact function of the tentacle-like protrusions are yet unknown, it is most likely that they are used for making contact with the other microbes for symbiotic exchange of energy and hydrogen.

=== Symbiogenesis and eukaryogenesis ===
Its ability to form permanent symbiosis indicates that P. syntrophicum or similar archaea could serve as a host cell that incorporated the surrounding microbes. Such a process of symbiogenesis resulted in the formation of the first eukaryotic cells. The associated microbes acted as power houses (such as mitochondria) of the cell and completely lost their independent cellular lives. In this way, the first eukaryotic cells could be formed by something like P. syntrophicum by engulfing their symbiotic microbes as their organelles. The extendable protrusions and their ability to make cell-to-cell contact is evidence for such an ability.

Eukaryogenesis is explained by the entangle-engulf-endogenize (E^{3}) model, which states that the archaeal host first contacted an adjacent cell using the extendable protrusions, then ingested the cell and contained in its cytoplasm as a functional organelle. Eukaryogenesis is estimated to have occurred around two billion years ago, when oxygen accumulated in the atmosphere. Due to changing atmospheric gases, exchange of nutrients by syntrophy was essential. The symbiosis between Promethearchaeum and Halodesulfovibrio supports such conditions. Archaea are not efficient cell eaters (phagocytosis), and would require unique cell appendages that would slowly trap and absorb the bacterial cell without destroying it. The energy-supplying bacterium would then be fully ingested, becoming the energy-producing endosymbiotic organelle, such as mitochondria, the main role of which in an eukaryotic cell is to produce the energy-rich molecule, ATP.

A special feature of P. syntrophicum of its ability to perform intracellular metabolism in hydrogen- or oxygen-rich environments by switching 2-oxoacid hydrolysis and oxidation processes depending on the partner endosymbionts, which further support the symbiogenesis. The switching ability is supported by an experimental replacement of Methanogenium with a different archaea, Methanobacterium, with which it survived normally. In this way, P. syntrophicum has been used as strong evidence for the hypothesis of syntrophic symbiogenesis. Ettema remarked that the archaea was "primed to become eukaryotes."

== See also ==
List of Archaea genera
