= White oak (disambiguation) =

The white oaks are species of trees in the genus Quercus section Quercus.

White oak, White Oak or Whiteoak may also refer to:

== Tree species ==
- Quercus alba, the species most commonly known as the white oak
- Quercus bicolor, swamp white oak
- Quercus arizonica, Arizona white oak
- Quercus garryana, Oregon white oak or Garry oak
- Quercus lobata, California white oak or valley oak
- Quercus polymorpha, Mexican white oak or Monterrey oak
- Lagunaria patersonia, the Queensland white oak

== Places in the United States ==
- White Oak, Georgia
- Whiteoak, Indiana
- White Oak, Kentucky
- White Oak, Maryland
- White Oak, Mississippi
- White Oak, Smith County, Mississippi
- White Oak, Missouri
- White Oak, North Carolina
- White Oak, Ohio (in Hamilton County)
- White Oak, Brown County, Ohio
- White Oak, Fayette County, Ohio
- White Oak, Oklahoma
- White Oak, Pennsylvania
- White Oak, Texas
- White Oak, Virginia
- White Oak, Raleigh County, West Virginia
- White Oak, Wisconsin
- White Oaks, New Mexico

== Bodies of water or wetlands ==
- White Oak Bayou in Texas
- White Oak Lake in White Oak Lake State Park, Arkansas
- White Oak Pocosin in North Carolina
- White Oak Pond in New Hampshire
- White Oak River in North Carolina
- Whiteoak Creek Falls in North Carolina

== Other uses ==
- White Oaks, London in London, Ontario
- White Oak Church in Virginia
- White Oak Dance Project
- White Oak Conservation, a wildlife and conservation center outside Yulee, Florida
- White Oak mill
- Whiteoaks Communications Group, a broadcasting company that owns several radio stations in Golden Horseshoe region of southern Ontario, Canada.
- White Oak (film), a 1921 silent western starring William S. Hart
- Whiteoak High School, Mowrystown, Ohio

== See also ==
- White Oak Township (disambiguation)
