= Yangjianarchaeales =

"Yangjianarchaeales" Temporal range: Paleozoic–Present

Scientific classification (Candidatus)
- Domain: Archaea
- Kingdom: Promethearchaeati
- Phylum: Promethearchaeota
- Class: "Odinarchaeia"
- Order: "Yangjianarchaeales"; Zhang et al., 2025

Order of Asgard archaea

"Yangjianarchaeales" is an order of Asgard archaea that belongs to the class "Odinarchaeia".
