= Wenzhongarchaeales =

Scientific classification (Candidatus)
- Domain: Archaea
- Kingdom: Promethearchaeati
- Phylum: Promethearchaeota
- Class: "Heimdallarchaeia"
- Order: "Wenzhongarchaeales"; Zhang et al., 2025

Order of Asgard archaea

"Wenzhongarchaeales" is an order of Asgard archaea that belongs to the class "Heimdallarchaeia".
