= White Township =

White Township may refer to the following places:

== In Canada ==
- White Township, Nipissing District, Ontario (geographic / historical)

== In the United States ==
=== Arkansas ===
- White Township, Ashley County, Arkansas
- White Township, Newton County, Arkansas
- White Township, Pike County, Arkansas
- White Township, Polk County, Arkansas

=== Kansas ===
- White Township, Kingman County, Kansas

=== Minnesota ===
- White Township, St. Louis County, Minnesota

=== Missouri ===
- White Township, Macon County, Missouri
- White Township, Benton County, Missouri

=== New Jersey ===
- White Township, Warren County, New Jersey

=== North Dakota ===
- White Township, Pierce County, North Dakota

=== Oklahoma ===
- White Township, McCurtain County, Oklahoma

=== Pennsylvania ===
- White Township, Beaver County, Pennsylvania
- White Township, Cambria County, Pennsylvania
- White Township, Indiana County, Pennsylvania

=== South Dakota ===
- White Township, Marshall County, South Dakota

== See also ==
- White Oak Township (disambiguation)
- White River Township (disambiguation)
- White Rock Township (disambiguation)
