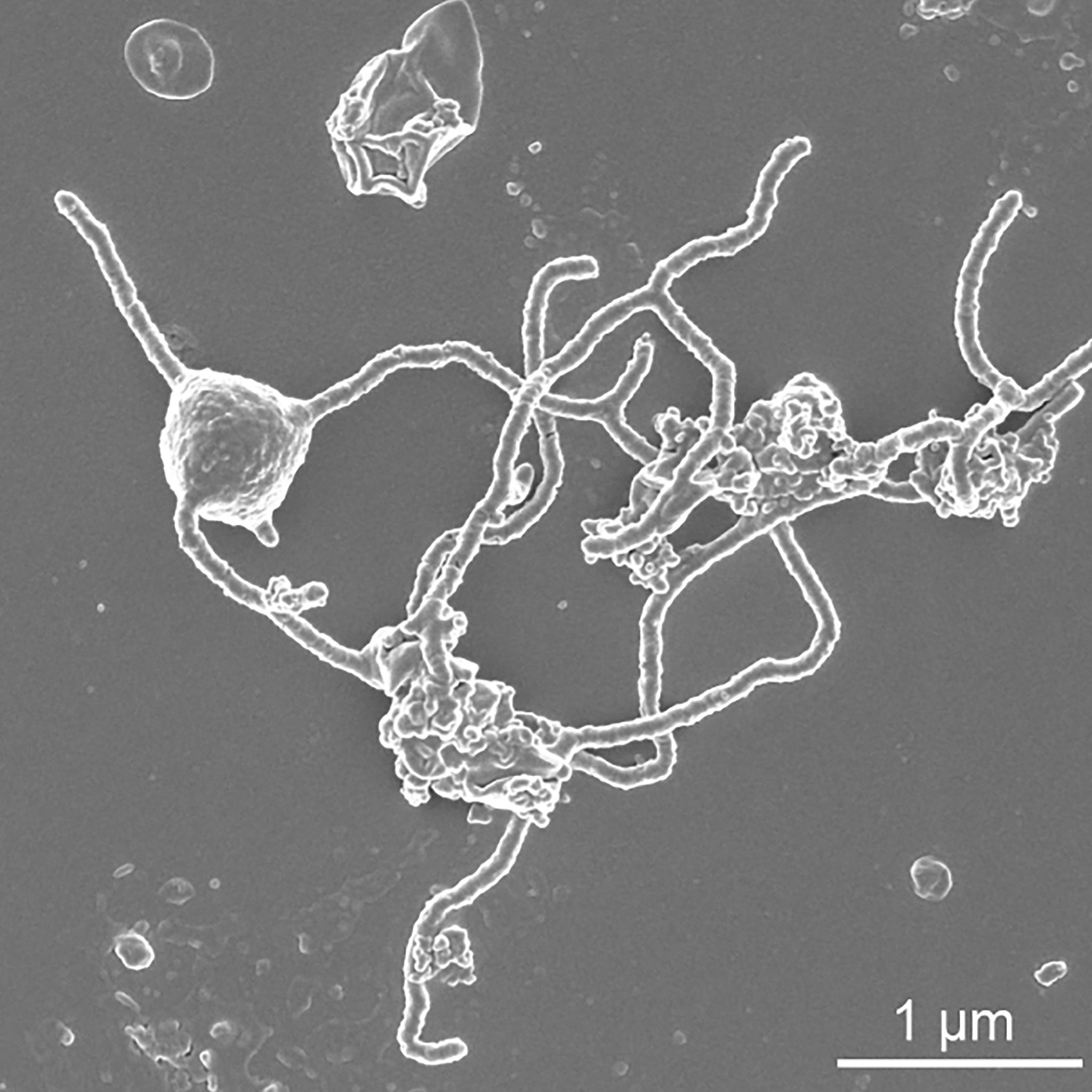
- SEM image of Promethearchaeum syntrophicum

Scientific classification
- Domain: Archaea
- Kingdom: Promethearchaeati; Imachi et al. 2024
- Phylum: Promethearchaeota; Imachi et al. 2024

Type genus
- Promethearchaeum Imachi et al., 2024

Classes
- "Asgardarchaeia"; "Atabeyarchaeia"; "Baldrarchaeia"; "Borrarchaeia"; "Freyarchaeia"; "Heimdallarchaeia"; "Hermodarchaeia"; "Jordarchaeia"; "Odinarchaeia"; Promethearchaeia; "Sifarchaeia"; "Sleipnirarchaeota"; "Thorarchaeia"; "Wukongarchaeia"
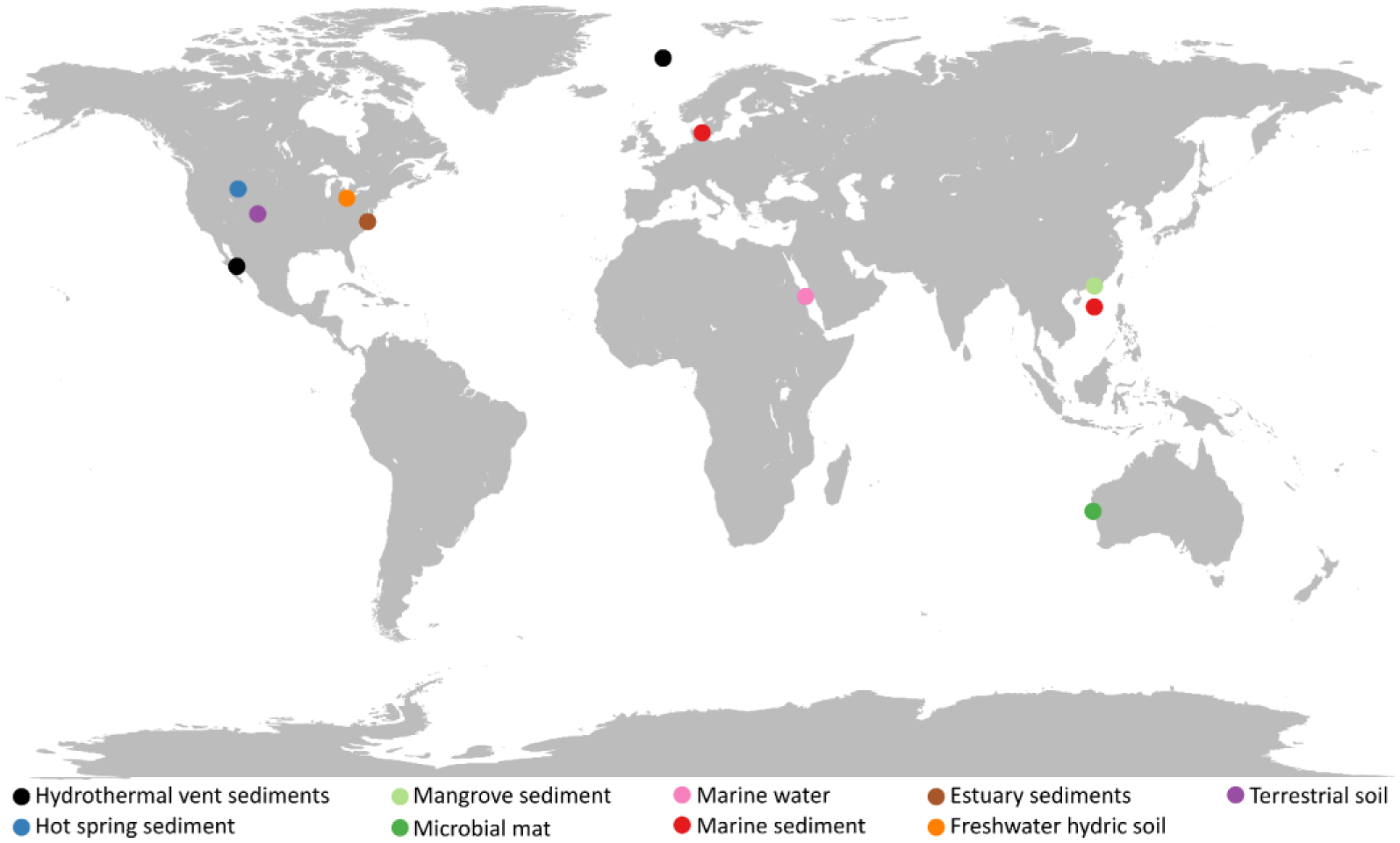

Synonyms
- "Asgard" Zaremba-Niedzwiedzka et al. 2017; "Asgardarchaeota" Da Cunha et al. 2017; "Asgardarchaeota" Bulzu et al. 2019; "Asgardarchaeota" Rinke et al. 2021; "Asgardaeota" Kirkpatrick, Walsh & D'Hondt 2019; "Asgardia" Cavalier-Smith & Chao 2020 (subphylum); "Asgardia" Cavalier-Smith & Chao 2020 (class)

= Asgard archaea =

Asgard archaea Temporal range: Paleoarchean–Present 3380–0 Ma

Kingdom of archaea

Asgard archaea, or Promethearchaeati (previously known as superphylum "Asgard" or phylum "Asgardarchaeota"), are a kingdom belonging to the domain Archaea that contain eukaryotic signature proteins. It appears that the eukaryotes, the domain that contains the animals, plants, fungi and protists, emerged within the Promethearchaeati, in a branch containing the "Heimdallarchaeia". This supports the two-domain system of classification over the three-domain system.

After including the kingdom category into ICNP, the only validly published name of this group is kingdom Promethearchaeati. All formerly proposed "phyla" would be de-ranked to classes in this framework.

== Discovery and nomenclature ==
In the summer of 2010, sediments were analysed from a gravity core taken in the rift valley on the Knipovich ridge in the Arctic Ocean, near the Loki's Castle hydrothermal vent site. Specific sediment horizons previously shown to contain high abundances of novel archaeal lineages were subjected to metagenomic analysis. In 2015, an Uppsala University-led team proposed the "Lokiarchaeota" phylum based on phylogenetic analyses using a set of highly conserved protein-coding genes. The group was named for the shape-shifting Norse god Loki, in an allusion to the hydrothermal vent complex from which the first genome sample originated. The Loki of mythology has been described as "a staggeringly complex, confusing, and ambivalent figure who has been the catalyst of countless unresolved scholarly controversies", analogous to the role of "Lokiarchaeota" in the debates about the origin of eukaryotes.

In 2016, a University of Texas-led team discovered "Thorarchaeia" from samples taken from the White Oak River in North Carolina, named in reference to Thor, another Norse god. Samples from Loki's Castle, Yellowstone National Park, Aarhus Bay, an aquifer near the Colorado River, New Zealand's Radiata Pool, hydrothermal vents near Taketomi Island, Japan, and the White Oak River estuary in the United States contained "Odinarchaeia" and "Heimdallarchaeia"; following the Norse deity naming convention, these groups were named for Odin and Heimdall respectively. Researchers therefore named the group containing these microbes "Asgard", after the home of the gods in Norse mythology. Two "Lokiarchaeota" specimens have been cultured, enabling a detailed insight into their morphology. Superphylum "Asgard" was renamed to kingdom Promethearchaeati and phylum "Lokiarchaeota" was renamed to class Promethearchaeia.

== Description ==
=== Proteins ===
Asgard archaea encode many eukaryotic signature proteins, including novel GTPases, membrane-remodelling proteins like ESCRT and SNF7, a ubiquitin modifier system, and N-glycosylation pathway homologs.

Asgard archaea have a regulated actin cytoskeleton, and the profilins and gelsolins they use can interact with eukaryotic actins. In addition, Asgard archaea tubulin from hydrothermal-living "Odinarchaeia" (OdinTubulin) was identified as a genuine tubulin. OdinTubulin forms protomers and protofilaments most similar to eukaryotic microtubules, yet assembles into ring systems more similar to FtsZ, indicating that OdinTubulin may represent an evolution intermediate between FtsZ and microtubule-forming tubulins. They also seem to form vesicles under cryogenic electron microscopy. Some may have a PKD domain S-layer. They also share the three-way ES39 expansion in LSU rRNA with eukaryotes. Gene clusters or operons encoding ribosomal proteins are often less conserved in their organization in the Asgard archaea than in other archaea, suggesting that the order of ribosomal protein coding genes may follow the phylogeny.

=== Metabolism ===
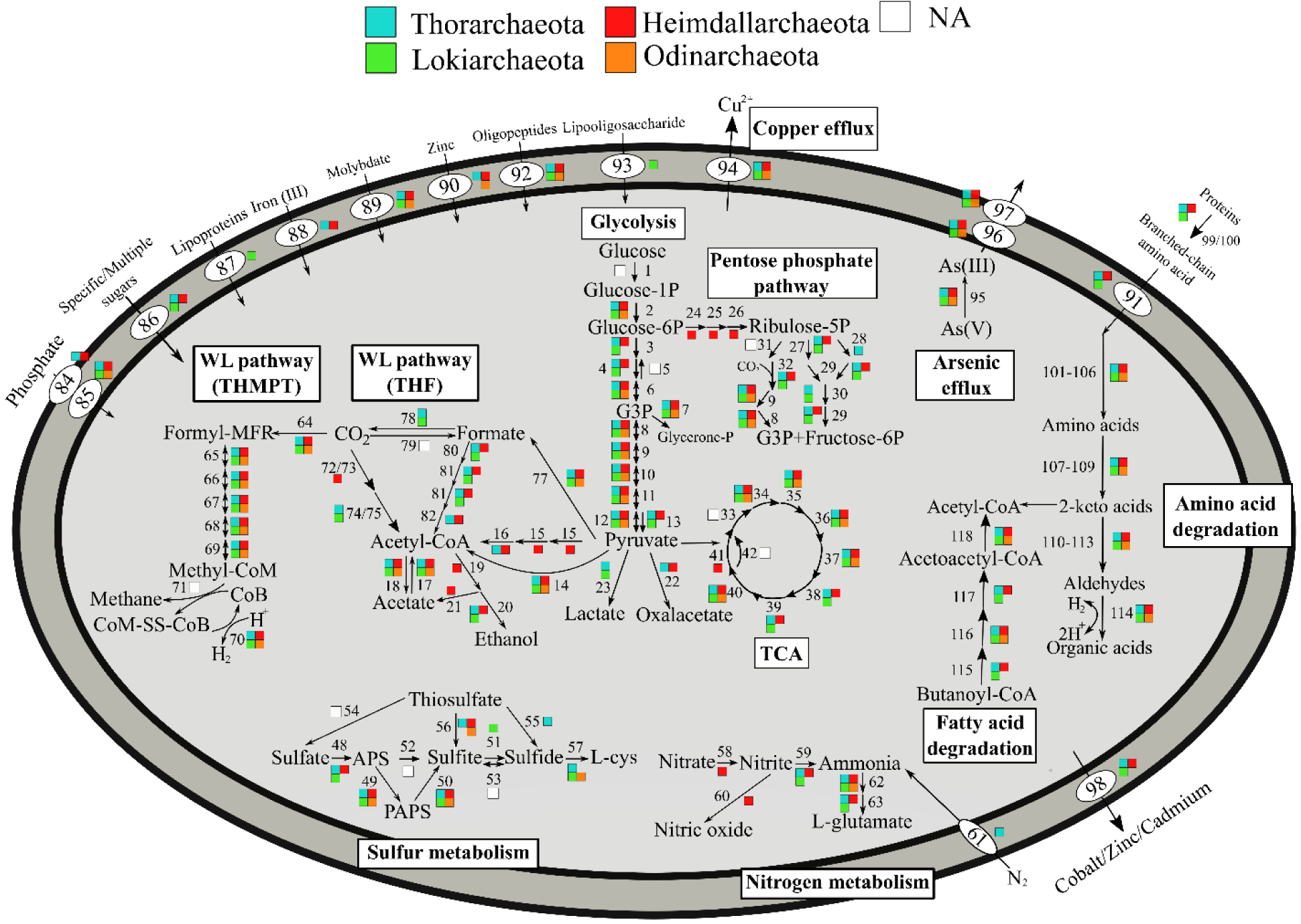
Metabolic pathways of Asgard archaea, varying by phyla, now de-ranked

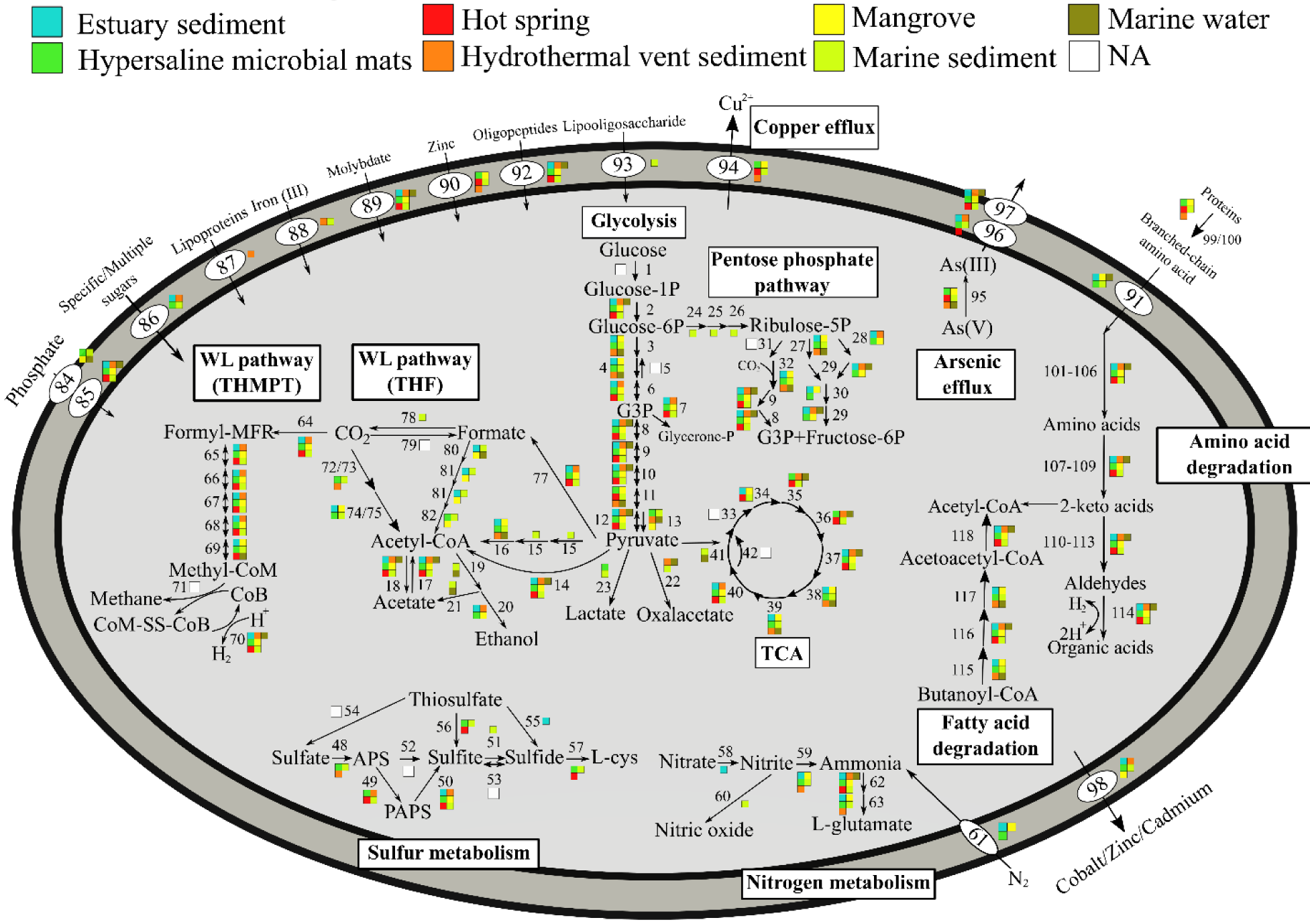
Metabolic pathways of Asgard archaea, varying by environment

Asgard archaea are generally obligate anaerobes, though "Kariarchaeaceae", "Gerdarchaeales" and "Hodarchaeales" may be facultative aerobes. They have a Wood–Ljungdahl pathway and perform glycolysis. Members can be autotrophs, heterotrophs, or phototrophs using heliorhodopsin. One member, Promethearchaeum syntrophicum, is syntrophic with a sulfur-reducing proteobacteria and a methanogenic archaea.

The RuBisCO they have is not carbon-fixing, but likely used for nucleoside salvaging.

=== Ecology ===
Asgard archaea are widely distributed around the world, both geographically and by habitat. Many of the known clades are restricted to sediments, whereas Promethearchaeia, "Thorarchaeia" and another clade occupy many different habitats. Salinity and depth are important ecological drivers for most Asgard archaea. Other habitats include the bodies of animals, the rhizosphere of plants, non-saline sediments and soils, the sea surface, and freshwater. In addition, Asgard archaea are associated with several other microorganisms.

=== Eukaryote-like features in subdivisions ===
The class "Heimdallarchaeia" was found in 2017 to have N-terminal core histone tails, a feature previously thought to be exclusively eukaryotic. Two other archaeal phyla, both non-Asgard archaea, were found to also have tails in 2018.

In January 2020, scientists found Promethearchaeum syntrophicum, a member of the Promethearchaeia, engaging in cross-feeding with two bacterial species. Drawing an analogy to symbiogenesis, they consider this relationship a possible link between the simple prokaryotic microorganisms and the complex eukaryotic microorganisms occurring approximately two billion years ago.

== Phylogeny ==
The phylogenetic relationships of the Asgard archaea have been studied by several teams in the 21st century. Varying results have been obtained, for instance using 53 marker proteins from the Genome Taxonomy Database. In 2023, Eme, Tamarit, Caceres and colleagues reported that the Eukaryota are deep within Asgard archaea, as sister of "Hodarchaeales" within the "Heimdallarchaeia".

Valentin-Alvarado et al. 2024, Kioukis et al. and Zhang et al. 2025

- Promethearchaeati Promethearchaeota
  - "Sleipnirarchaeota"
  - - "Asgardarchaeia"
    - - "Baldrarchaeia"
      - - - "Freyarchaeia"
          - "Atabeyarchaeia"
        - - "Thorarchaeia"
          - "Hermodarchaeia"
        - - - Promethearchaeia
              - "Helarchaeales"
              - Promethearchaeales
          - - - "Jordarchaeia"
              - - "Odinarchaeia"
                  - "Odinarchaeales"
                  - "Yangjianarchaeales"
            - - "Sifarchaeia"
              - - "Wukongarchaeia"
                - - - Eukaryota
                    - - "Wenzhongarchaeales"
                      - "Hodarchaeales"
                  - - "Gerdarchaeales"
                    - - "Heimdallarchaeales"
                        - "Heimdallarchaeaceae"
                        - "Kariarchaeaceae"

11-RS232 (15th April 2026)

- Promethearchaeati Promethearchaeota
  - - "Thorarchaeia"
      - "Thorarchaeales"
        "Thorarchaeaceae"
    - "Asgardarchaeia"
      - "Asgardarchaeales"
        "Asgardarchaeaceae"
  - - - "Atabeyarchaeia"
        - "Atabeyarchaeales"
          "Atabeyarchaeaceae"
    - - - - "Baldrarchaeia"
            - "Baldrarchaeales"
              "Baldrarchaeaceae"
          - "Jordiarchaeia"
            - "Jordiarchaeia"
              - "Freyrarchaeaceae"
              - "Jordarchaeaceae"
        - - - "Odinarchaeia"
              - "Odinarchaeales"
                "Odinarchaeaceae"
          - - "Hermodarchaeia"
              - "Hermodarchaeales"
                "Hermodarchaeaceae"
            - Promethearchaeia
              - "Helarchaeales"
              - - Promethearchaeales
                  - "Sigynarchaeaceae"
                  - Promethearchaeaceae
      - - - "Borrarchaeia"
            - "Sifarchaeales"
              "Sifarchaeaceae"
            - "Borrarchaeales"
              "Borrarchaeaceae"
        - - - "Wukongarchaeia"
              - "Wukongarchaeales"
                "Wukongarchaeaceae"
          - - "Njordarchaeia"
              - "Njordarchaeales"
                - "Panguiarchaeaceae"
                - "Njordarchaeaceae"
            - "Heimdallarchaeia"
              - - "Hodarchaeales"
                  "Hodarchaeaceae"
              - - "Gerdarchaeales" (JABLTI01)
                - - "Heimdallarchaeales"
                    - "Kariarchaeaceae"
                    - "Heimdallarchaeaceae"

=== Taxonomy ===
In the theory of symbiogenesis, a merger of an archaean and an aerobic bacterium created the eukaryotes, with aerobic mitochondria; a second merger added chloroplasts, creating the green plants.

In the depicted scenario, the Eukaryota are deep in the Asgard archaeal tree. A favored scenario is syntrophy, where one organism depends on the feeding of the other. An α-proteobacterium was incorporated to become the mitochondrion. In culture, extant Asgard archaea form various syntrophic dependencies. Gregory Fournier and Anthony Poole have proposed that Asgard archaea is part of "the Eukaryote tree", forming a taxon they call "Eukaryomorpha" defined by "shared derived characters" (eukaryote signature proteins). The kingdom contains one phylum, Promethearchaeota.

== Genomic elements ==
=== Viruses ===
Several family-level groups of viruses associated with Asgard archaea have been discovered using metagenomics. The viruses were assigned to Promethearchaeia, "Thorarchaeia", "Odinarchaeia" and "Helarchaeia" hosts using CRISPR spacer matching to the corresponding protospacers within the viral genomes. Two groups of viruses (called 'verdandiviruses') are related to archaeal and bacterial viruses of the class Caudoviricetes, i.e., viruses with icosahedral capsids and helical tails; two other distinct groups (called 'skuldviruses') are distantly related to tailless archaeal and bacterial viruses with icosahedral capsids of the realm Varidnaviria; and the third group of viruses (called wyrdviruses) is related to archaea-specific viruses with lemon-shaped virus particles (family Halspiviridae). The viruses have been identified in deep-sea sediments and a terrestrial hot spring of the Yellowstone National Park. All these viruses display very low sequence similarity to other known viruses but are generally related to the previously described prokaryotic viruses, with no meaningful affinity to viruses of eukaryotes.

=== Mobile genetic elements ===
In addition to viruses, several groups of cryptic mobile genetic elements have been discovered through CRISPR spacer matching to be associated with Asgard archaea of the Promethearchaeia, "Thorarchaeia" and "Heimdallarchaeia" lineages. These mobile elements do not encode recognizable viral hallmark proteins and could represent either novel types of viruses or plasmids.

== See also ==
- List of Archaea genera
