= White River Township, Indiana =

White River Township, Indiana may refer to one of the following places:

- White River Township, Gibson County, Indiana
- White River Township, Hamilton County, Indiana
- White River Township, Johnson County, Indiana
- White River Township, Randolph County, Indiana

See also

- White River Township (disambiguation)
