= White Oak Township =

White Oak Township may refer to the following places:

== Arkansas ==
- White Oak Township, Cleveland County, Arkansas
- White Oak Township, Franklin County, Arkansas
- White Oak Township, Sebastian County, Arkansas

== Illinois ==
- White Oak Township, McLean County, Illinois

== Iowa ==
- White Oak Township, Mahaska County, Iowa
- White Oak Township, Warren County, Iowa

== Michigan ==
- White Oak Township, Ingham County, Michigan

== Minnesota ==
- White Oak Township, Hubbard County, Minnesota

== Missouri ==
- White Oak Township, Henry County, Missouri
- White Oak Township, Harrison County, Missouri

== North Carolina ==
- White Oak Township, Bladen County, North Carolina
- White Oak Township, Carteret County, North Carolina
- White Oak Township, Haywood County, North Carolina
- White Oak Township, Onslow County, North Carolina
- White Oak Township, Polk County, North Carolina
- White Oak Township, Wake County, North Carolina

== Ohio ==
- White Oak Township, Highland County, Ohio

== See also ==
- White Township (disambiguation)
- White River Township (disambiguation)
- White Rock Township (disambiguation)
- White Oak (disambiguation)
