= Hodarchaeum =

"Candidatus Hodarchaeum" Temporal range: Paleoproterozoic–Present

Scientific classification (Candidatus)
- Domain: Archaea
- Kingdom: Promethearchaeati
- Phylum: Promethearchaeota
- Class: "Heimdallarchaeia"
- Order: "Hodarchaeales"; Liu et al. 2021
- Family: "Hodarchaeaceae"; Liu et al. 2021
- Genus: "Ca. Hodarchaeum" Liu et al. 2021
- Species: "Ca. Hodarchaeum mangrovi"

Binomial name
- "Ca. Hodarchaeum mangrovi" Liu et al. 2021

Genus of Asgard archaea

"Candidatus Hodarchaeum" is a monotypic genus of Promethearchaeati archaea. It contains the sole species "Ca. Hodarchaeum mangrovi". It is in the monotypic family "Hodarchaeaceae", monotypic order "Hodarchaeales" and class "Heimdallarchaeia".
