= White River Township =

White River Township may refer to:

== Canada ==
- White River, Ontario

== United States ==
=== Arkansas ===
- White River Township, Independence County, Arkansas, in Independence County, Arkansas
- White River Township, Izard County, Arkansas, in Izard County, Arkansas
- White River Township, Madison County, Arkansas
- White River Township, Marion County, Arkansas, in Marion County, Arkansas
- White River Township, Prairie County, Arkansas, in Prairie County, Arkansas
- White River Township, Washington County, Arkansas, in Washington County, Arkansas
- White River Township, Woodruff County, Arkansas, in Woodruff County, Arkansas

=== Indiana ===
- White River Township, Gibson County, Indiana
- White River Township, Hamilton County, Indiana
- White River Township, Johnson County, Indiana
- White River Township, Randolph County, Indiana

=== Michigan ===
- White River Township, Michigan

=== Missouri ===
- White River Township, Barry County, Missouri

== See also ==
- White Township (disambiguation)
- White Oak Township (disambiguation)
- White Rock Township (disambiguation)
- White River (disambiguation)
