= Eukaryogenesis =

Process of forming the first eukaryotic cell

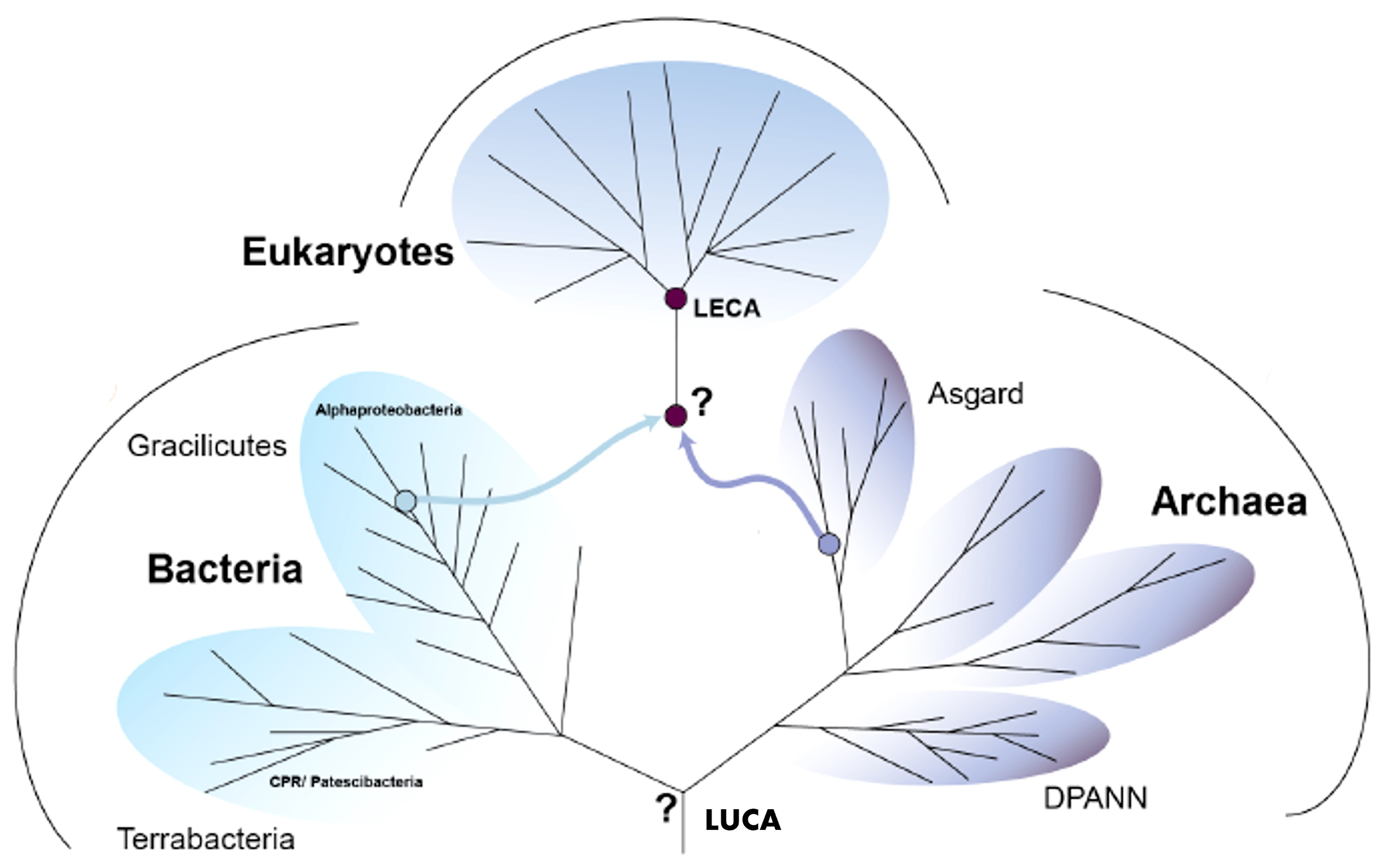
LUCA and LECA: the origins of the eukaryotes. The point of fusion (marked "?") below LECA is the FECA, the first eukaryotic common ancestor, some 2.2 billion years ago. Much earlier, some 4 billion years ago, the LUCA gave rise to the two domains of prokaryotes, the bacteria and the archaea. After the LECA, some 2 billion years ago, the eukaryotes diversified into a crown group, which gave rise to fungi, animals, plants, and diverse protists.

Eukaryogenesis, the process which created the eukaryotic cell and lineage, is a milestone in the evolution of life, since eukaryotes include all complex cells and almost all multicellular organisms. The process is widely agreed to have involved symbiogenesis, in which an archaean and one or more bacteria contributed to the lineage leading to the last eukaryotic common ancestor (LECA). It appears also to have involved horizontal gene transfers from other groups of bacteria, with some of these transfers mediated by giant viruses. The LECA had a new level of complexity and capability, with a nucleus, facultatively aerobic mitochondria, sex (meiosis and syngamy), flagella, a dormant cyst with a cell wall of chitin and/or cellulose and peroxisomes.

The sequence of steps involved in eukaryogenesis has been disputed; mitochondria, an endomembrane system, and the nucleus arose in an unknown sequence. Another possibility is viral eukaryogenesis, in which a viral infection of an archaean enabled a bacterium to enter the cell. Other microbes than the archaean and the bacterium that became the mitochondrion may well have been involved, most likely by horizontal gene transfer. In turn, the LECA gave rise to the eukaryotes' crown group, containing the ancestors of fungi, animals, plants, and diverse protists.

== Context ==
Life arose on Earth once it had cooled enough for oceans to form. That developed into the last universal common ancestor (LUCA), an organism which had ribosomes and the genetic code, around 4 billion years ago. It gave rise to two domains of life, the bacteria and the archaea. From among these small-celled ancestors arose the eukaryotes, with a much wider range of cell sizes, and more complex cells with nuclei, a cytoskeleton, and an endomembrane system. The eukaryotes form a third domain that contains all complex cells and most types of multicellular organisms, including the animals, plants, and fungi.

It is not known how the bacteria and archaea gave rise to eukaryotes, as the fossil record of ancient single-celled organisms is fragmentary. Instead biologists have focused on reconstructing the properties of the last eukaryotic common ancestor (LECA) from what is known of the genomes of different lineages of modern eukaryotes.

== Last eukaryotic common ancestor ==
Reconstruction of LECA. Key: 1) Nucleus with nucleolus and eu/heterochromatin 2) Endoplasmic reticulum 3) Peroxisome 4) Endo/lysosome, ESCRT system 5) Golgi apparatus 6) Endo/exocytosis, actin-based 7) Pseudo/Filopodium 8) Sterol-based membrane; G3P + ester bond phospholipids 9) Microtubule-based cytoskeleton and organising centre 10) Basal bodies 11) Vacuoles 12) Iron-sulphur cluster biosynthesis via the CIA system 13) Mitochondria 14) Flagella, microtubule-based

=== Organelles ===
The last eukaryotic common ancestor (LECA) is the hypothetical most recent common ancestor of all living eukaryotes, around 2 billion years ago, and was most likely a biological population. It is believed, on the basis of study of the genomes of different lineages of modern eukaryotes, to have been a single cell with a nucleus, facultatively aerobic mitochondria, sex (meiosis and syngamy), flagella, a dormant cyst with a cell wall of chitin and/or cellulose, and peroxisomes.

It has been proposed that the LECA fed by phagocytosis, engulfing other organisms. The LECA has been described as having "spectacular cellular complexity". Its cell was divided into compartments such as the Golgi apparatus, the endoplasmic reticulum, and the nuclear envelope. It appears to have inherited a set of endosomal sorting complex proteins that enable membranes to be remodelled, including pinching off vesicles to form endosomes.

=== Genetic mechanisms ===
In eukaryotes, unlike in prokaryotes, the mechanisms for transcribing DNA into RNA, and then for translating the RNA into proteins, were separated, permitting extensive RNA processing and allowing the expression of genes to become more complex. It had mechanisms for reshuffling its genetic material, and possibly for manipulating its own evolvability. All of these gave the LECA "a compelling cohort of selective advantages".

=== Eukaryotic sex ===
Sex in eukaryotes is a composite process, consisting of meiosis and fertilisation, which can be coupled to reproduction. Dacks and Roger proposed on the basis of a phylogenetic analysis that facultative sex was likely present in the LECA. Early in eukaryotic evolution, about 2 billion years ago, organisms needed a solution to the major problem that oxidative metabolism releases reactive oxygen species that damage the genetic material, DNA. Eukaryotic sex provides a process, homologous recombination during meiosis, for using informational redundancy to repair such DNA damage.

== Symbiogenesis ==
In the theory of symbiogenesis, a merger of an archaean and an aerobic bacterium created the eukaryotes, with aerobic mitochondria, some 2.2 billion years ago. A second merger, 1.6 billion years ago, added chloroplasts, creating the green plants.

According to the theory of symbiogenesis (the endosymbiotic theory) championed by Lynn Margulis, the eukaryotic cell originated from an archaeal cell that gained a bacterial cell as a component or symbiont. The archaeal cell was a member of the Asgard archaea (more recently identified as one of the "Heimdallarchaeia" within Promethearchaeota. The bacterium was one of the alphaproteobacteria, which had the ability to use oxygen in its respiration. This enabled it – and the archaeal cells that included it – to survive in the presence of oxygen, which was poisonous to other organisms adapted to reducing conditions. The endosymbiotic bacteria became the eukaryotic cell's mitochondria, providing most of the energy of the cell. (Note: Margulis and colleagues also suggested that the cell acquired a spirochaete bacterium as a symbiont, providing the cell skeleton of microtubules and the ability to move, including the ability to pull chromosomes into two sets during mitosis, cell division, but that hypothesis never had significant data in its support and has been consistently rejected by the scientific community.) Endosymbiosis is broadly accepted in the origin of eukaryotes, though the scenarios involved continue to be debated.

== Scenarios ==
=== Competing sequences of mitochondria, membranes, and nucleus ===
Biologists have proposed multiple scenarios for the creation of the eukaryotes. While there is broad agreement that the LECA must have had a nucleus, mitochondria, and internal membranes, the order in which these were acquired has been disputed. In the syntrophic model, the first eukaryotic common ancestor (FECA, around 2.2 gya) gained mitochondria, then membranes, then a nucleus. In the phagotrophic model, it gained a nucleus, then membranes, then mitochondria. In a more complex model, it gained all three in short order, and then other capabilities. Other models have been proposed. Whatever happened, many lineages must have been created, but the LECA either out-competed or came together with the other lineages to form a single point of origin for the eukaryotes.

Nick Lane and William Martin have argued that mitochondria came first, on the grounds that energy had been the limiting factor on the size of the prokaryotic cell. Enrique M. Muro et al. have argued, however, that the genetic system needed to reach a critical point that led to a new regulatory system (with introns and the spliceosome), which enabled coordination between genetic networks. The phagotrophic model presupposes the ability to engulf food, enabling the cell to engulf the aerobic bacterium that became the mitochondrion.

Eugene Koonin and others, noting that the archaea share many features with eukaryotes, argue that rudimentary eukaryotic traits such as membrane-lined compartments were acquired before endosymbiosis added mitochondria to the early eukaryotic cell, while the cell wall was lost. In the same way, mitochondrial acquisition must not be regarded as the end of the process, for still new complex families of genes had to be developed after or during the endosymbiotic exchange. In this way, from FECA to LECA, the organisms can be considered as proto-eukaryotes. At the end of the process, LECA was already a complex organism with protein families involved in cellular compartmentalization.

Nico Bremer and others confirmed that the LECA had mitochondria, and stated that it had multiple nuclei, but disputed that it was phagotrophic. This would mean that the ability found in many eukaryotes to engulf materials developed later, rather than being acquired first and used to engulf the alphaproteobacteria that became mitochondria.

Eukaryogenesis involved symbiogenesis to form mitochondria, evolution of membrane-lined compartments like the nucleus, and multiple horizontal gene transfers; but the order of events is disputed.

=== Viral eukaryogenesis ===
Another scenario is viral eukaryogenesis, which proposes that the eukaryotes arose as an emergent superorganism, with the nucleus deriving from a "viral factory" alongside the alphaproteobacterium mitochondrion, hosted by an archaeal cell. In this scenario, eukaryogenesis began when a virus colonised an archaeal cell, making it support the production of viruses. The virus may later have assisted the bacterium's entry into the reprogrammed cell. Eukaryotes share genes for several DNA synthesis and transcription enzymes with DNA viruses (Nucleocytoviricota). Those viruses may thus be older than the LECA and may have exchanged DNA with proto-eukaryotes.

=== Associations of microbes ===
Biologists have long speculated that eukaryogenesis might have involved associations with other microbes. In 2026, Moisès Bernabeu and colleagues stated in Nature on the basis of phylogenomics, across the full range of cellular organisms and viruses, that LECA had derived its proteins from multiple types of bacteria. They suggest that this occurred in repeated horizontal gene transfers, and that some of these most likely took place before the endosymbiosis that created mitochondria. The lead researcher, Toni Gabaldón, commented that the explanation of the origin of eukaryotes as a symbiosis of an archaeon with a bacterium is incomplete, as other bacteria and giant viruses had been involved. The bacteria included Planctomycetota and later the Myxococcota, while the giant viruses belonged to the Nucleocytoviricota. The viruses appear to have served to transfer genes between different microbes and hence to construct the genome of the LECA.

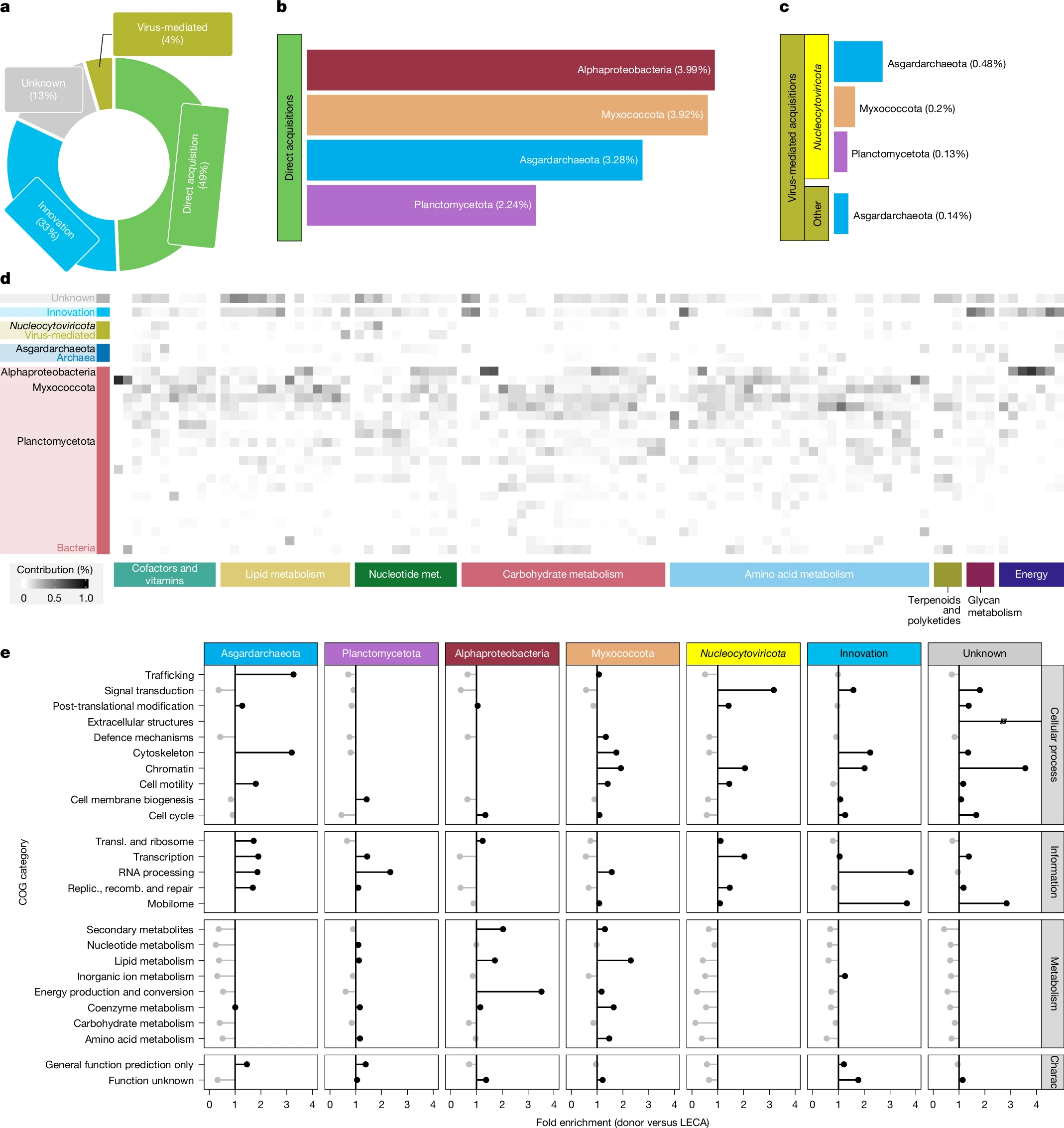
Summary of the ancestries of LECA's proteins. Ancestral lineages: Brown: Alphaproteobacteria; Light brown: Myxococcota; Blue: Promethearchaeota (Note: "Asgardarchaeota" used in Bernabeu 2026 is a synonym of Promethearchaeota.)); Purple: Planctomycetota.

== Diversification: crown eukaryotes ==
In turn, the LECA gave rise to the eukaryotes' crown group, containing the ancestors of animals, fungi, plants, and a diverse range of single-celled organisms with the new capabilities and complexity of the eukaryotic cell. Single cells without cell walls are fragile and have a low probability of being fossilised. If fossils do form, they have few features to distinguish them clearly from prokaryotes: size, morphological complexity, and (eventually) multicellularity. Early eukaryote fossils, from the late Paleoproterozoic, include Tappania from 1.63 gya and Shuiyousphaeridium from 1.8 gya, both microscopic acritarchs with ornate and relatively robust carbonaceous vesicles, but no resolved assignment to any specific group of modern eukaryotes. As such, they are occasionally considered possible stem group eukaryotes, prior to LECA. The earliest fossils confidently assigned to crown eukaryotes appear at around 1.00 gya, such as the putative algae Bangiomorpha and Proterocladus, the fungus Ourasphaira and the holozoan Bicellum.

The LECA's position (i.e. the root) on the eukaryotic tree of life remains controversial. Stechmann and Cavalier-Smith 2003 suggested that the first split after the LECA happened between the Unikonta and the Bikonta, while Adl et al. 2012, and Derelle and Lang 2012 proposed a split between Amorphea and all other eukaryotes. Al Jewari and Baldauf 2023 argued instead that the first split happened within Excavata, while Cerón-Romero et al. 2024 favoured a first split between the Opisthokonta and all the others. Derelle et al 2015 place the first split as between the Opimoda and the Diphoda (corresponding roughly to the former Unikonta and Bikonta), while Williamson et al 2025 suggest possible extensions to the two new clades.
