= Radiata Pool =

Hot spring in New Zealand

Coordinates: 36.92570°S 174.83550°E

Radiata Pool is a 60°C hot spring in the Ngatamariki geothermic field in Waikato, New Zealand. It has an acidity of 7.72 pH (slightly basic), and is surrounded by dense vegetation. Inside the pool, there are dead branches and a wide diversity of micro-organisms. It is approximately 10 by 5 metres. The composition of the pool includes chlorides, sodium, bicarbonates, silicon and sulfates.

In 2016 Radiata Pool was sampled, and found Odinarchaeota and Heimdallarchaeota.
