= PKD domain =

Identifiers
- Symbol: PKD
- Pfam: PF00801
- InterPro: IPR000601
- SMART: PKD
- SCOP2: 1b4r / SCOPe / SUPFAM
- CDD: cd00146
Available protein structures:
- Pfam: structures / ECOD
- PDB: RCSB PDB; PDBe; PDBj
- PDBsum: structure summary
- PDB: 1l0qB:353–424 2c26A:1363–1442 2c4xA:1363–1442 1b4rA:277–352 1wgoA:787–869

PKD (Polycystic Kidney Disease) domain was first identified in the polycystic kidney disease protein, polycystin-1 (PKD1 gene), and contains an Ig-like fold consisting of a beta-sandwich of seven strands in two sheets with a Greek key topology, although some members have additional strands. Polycystin-1 is a large cell-surface glycoprotein involved in adhesive protein–protein and protein–carbohydrate interactions; however it is not clear if the PKD domain mediates any of these interactions.

PKD domains are also found in other proteins, usually in the extracellular parts of proteins involved in interactions with other proteins. For example, domains with a PKD-type fold are found in archaeal S-layer proteins that protect the cell from extreme environments, and in the human receptor SorCS2.

== Human proteins containing this domain ==
GPNMB; PKD1; PKD1L1; PMEL; SORCS1; SORCS2; SORCS3
