= SorCS2 =

Gene is found on chromosome 4

SORCS2

Identifiers
- Aliases: SORCS2, sortilin related VPS10 domain containing receptor 2
- External IDs: OMIM: 606284; MGI: 1932289; GeneCards: SORCS2
Available structures
PDB	Ortholog search: PDBe RCSB
PDB	List of PDB id codes 1WGO

Gene location (Human)
Chr.	Chromosome 4 (human)
Band	4p16.1	Start	7,192,538 bp
Band	4p16.1	End	7,742,836 bp

Gene location (Mouse)
Chr.	Chromosome 5 (mouse)
Band	5|5 B3	Start	36,174,524 bp
Band	5|5 B3	End	36,555,483 bp
RNA expression pattern
Bgee	Human / Mouse (ortholog); Top expressed in: corpus callosum; tibial nerve; sural nerve; nucleus accumbens; caudate nucleus; putamen; Brodmann area 23; right frontal lobe; primary visual cortex; Brodmann area 9 / Top expressed in: Region II of hippocampus proper; saccule; CA3 field; efferent ductule; internal carotid artery; otic vesicle; habenula; external carotid artery; Gonadal ridge; vas deferens; More reference expression data
BioGPS	n/a
Gene ontology
Molecular function	neuropeptide receptor activity
Cellular component	membrane; integral component of membrane; integral component of plasma membrane; postsynaptic density; early endosome membrane; recycling endosome membrane
Biological process	neuropeptide signaling pathway; intracellular protein transport; long-term depression
Sources:Amigo / QuickGO
Orthologs
Databases	NCBI: entry; OMA: entry
Species	Human	Mouse
Entrez	57537	81840
Ensembl	ENSG00000184985	ENSMUSG00000029093
UniProt	Q96PQ0	Q9EPR5
RefSeq (mRNA)	NM_020777	NM_030889
RefSeq (protein)	NP_065828	NP_112151
Location (UCSC)	Chr 4: 7.19 – 7.74 Mb	Chr 5: 36.17 – 36.56 Mb
PubMed search
- Wikidata
View/Edit Human	View/Edit Mouse

The SorCS2 (sortilin-related Vps10p domain containing receptor 2) gene is found on chromosome 4 (4p16.1), and is composed of 28 exons. The N-terminal exons which encode the Vps10p domain are spaced by large introns. The functional receptor protein is largely present in the brain. It is 1109 amino acids long, largely neutral, and has a single transmembrane pass....

SorCS2 is a member of the mammalian Vps10p (vacuolar protein sorting 10 protein) domain family consisting of five transmembrane proteins with structural similarities: SorCS1, SorCS2, SorCS3, SorLA (sorting protein-related receptor with A-type repeats), and sortilin. SorCS2 specifically has critical roles in neuronal viability and function. Single nucleotide polymorphisms (SNPs) in the protein has been associated with a range of diseases including attention-deficit hyperactivity disorder (ADHD), bipolar disorders, and schizophrenia, and the receptor family has also been associated with Alzheimer's disease and type 2 diabetes.

== Discovery ==
The Vps10p domain receptor family was based on the discovery of SorLA in 1996 and sortilin in 1997, and has since been expanded with the SorCS subfamily with SorCS2 being described in 2001

SorCS2 was first found from isolated cDNA in murine floor plate samples of the central nervous system (CNS) as well as in regions of the brain. The cDNA contained the characteristic Vps10p domain enabling its classification as a SorCS protein. Not long after, a corresponding partial cDNA was found in human samples, and it was possible to determine the missing N-terminal by homology to murine SorCS2.

== Structure ==
SorCS2 is composed of a small intracellular region making a single pass into the extracellular environment where the large Vps10p domain make up a beta-propeller structure consisting of 10 propeller blade-like beta sheet regions. The Vps10p domain contains at least 2 unspecific ligand binding sites. The domain also contains a furin cleavage site. The extracellular region of SorCS proteins also include a LR (leucine rich domain) containing imperfect LR repeats (LRRs) which are known to serve as interaction and adhesion domains

Modifications in Vps10p-type receptors include glycosylations. and they also contain a propeptide which is proteolytically cleaved off to make them active

In the non-neuronal glia cells, SorCS2 is cleaved and a linkage forms a two-chained product distinct from that in neurons which is a single chained. The processing in glia cells have been linked to proapoptotic properties not found in neuronal SorCS2. This differential processing is thought to be common in Vps10p domain proteins where it regulates receptor functionality

=== Dimerization ===
Efforts have been made to elucidate the structure of SorCS2, and this has allowed determination of dimerization of SorCS2 and the other two SorCS proteins with only few monomeric structures found. This dimerization is promoted by deglycosylation at least in SorCS1. Structurally, the Vps10p domains in SorCS proteins can be found next to each other, but uniquely for SorCS2 it is prevalently found in a dimer where the domains are located away from each other and connected at a two-fold rotation axis for the dimer. The different types of dimers could explain correspondingly different functions of SorCS2 found in different tissues. In addition to the homodimers described, the SorCS proteins also forms heterodimers within this subfamily. Crystal structures of the full extracellular portion of SorCS2 have uncovered that SorCS2 consists of six domains. Five domains contribute to the dimerization of SorCS2. Despite the extensive dimerization interface, SorCS2 has substantial conformational plasticity.

== Localization ==
SorCS2 and related proteins in the Vps10p domain family are predominantly found in neurons in the brain, but are also present in other tissues. In terms of brain localization SorCS2 has been found predominantly in thalamus, floor plate of the midbrain and spinal cord, ventricular zones of hippocampal and accumbens areas, meninges, and Schwann cells. The localization is distinct from the other Vps10p receptor sortilin

SorCS2 has further been found in tissues that are not brain related in smaller amounts e.g. in structures of mesodermal origin such as adipose tissue, striated muscle tissues, and developing bone as well as connective tissue such as the dermis, submucosal, and submesothelial tissues in the gut, and the bronchial system. Although the presence in these tissues are largely uninvestigated, they still form the basis for further specific functions in non-brain tissue.

== Function ==
All members of the Vps10p protein family are multiligand receptors. They can take part in cellular trafficking and signaling through ligand binding in response to cellular conditions. Examples of ligands are neurotrophic factors, amyloid precursor protein (APP), lipoproteins, and cytokines. In addition to depending on the cellular context, the affinity for specific ligands can also be modulated by the monomer/dimer ratio.

=== BDNF-dependent plasticity ===
Hippocampal N-methyl-D-aspartate (NMDA) receptor-dependent synaptic plasticity is found to be deficient at least in SorCS2 mutant mice, strongly suggesting a link between the two. SorCS2 deficient mice also show decreased long-term memory, higher tendency to take risks, and to have a more stimuli seeking behaviour than corresponding SorCS2 normal mice.

The decrease in plasticity is attributed to the fact that SorCS2 forms a complex with p75^{NTR}, a neurotrophin receptor which interacts with proBDNF (brain-derived neurotrophic factor) and TrkB (BDNF receptor tyrosine kinase) inside neurons in the hippocampal region of the brain to modulate synapse depression and potentiation respectively. Thus, SorCS2 could be the link between BDNF/proBDNF signaling and mental disorders. Deficiency in this signaling can affect the strengthening and weakening of synapses, that is, neuronal plasticity.

== Clinical significance ==
=== Alcohol withdrawal ===
When trying to stop excessive alcohol consumption alcohol withdrawal (AW) is physiological responses that in some cases can cause life-threatening seizures. SorCS2 has been associated with the severity of AW in genome analysis of European American test subjects, although no such connection could be made in African American samples

A specific SorCS2 risk haplotype disrupts a transcription factor (TF) binding site in a stress hormone-modulated regulatory enhancer element with activity in human hippocampus. This region of the brain is already known for its association with AW. This increases the severity of AW in patients with alcoholism. Exposure to ethanol and glucocorticoids have been found to act as up-regulators of SorCS2, causing worsening of the problems if the risk variant of SorCS2 is present.

== See also ==
- SorCS1
- SorCS3
- Sortilin
- SorLA
- Vps10p domain
