= White Oak Pocosin =

Swamp in North Carolina, United States of America

Coordinates: 34°56′02″N 77°25′58″W

The White Oak Pocosin is a large swamp in northern Onslow County and southern Jones County, North Carolina in the United States. It provides the headwaters of the White Oak River. The word pocosin is a Native American word meaning "swamp".
