= White Oak River =

Location
- Country: United States

Physical characteristics
- Source
  - location: North Carolina
- Mouth
  - location: Atlantic Ocean
- Length: 48 mi (77 km)

Basin features
- River system: White Oak River

The White Oak River is a blackwater river, close to 48 mi (77 km) long, on the coastal plain of southeast North Carolina in the United States. It empties in the Atlantic Ocean.

== Course ==
It rises in the White Oak Pocosin in northern Onslow County and southern Jones County approximately 15 mi (24 km) north of Jacksonville. It flows east, then SSE, along the border between Onslow, Jones and Carteret counties, and forming the western boundary of Croatan National Forest. The lower 10 mi (16 km) of the river is a tidal estuary, approximately 1.6 km wide. It enters the Atlantic at Bogue Sound, then passes between two barrier islands (Bogue Banks and Bear Island) through Bogue Inlet into the open Atlantic at Onslow Bay.

== Habitat ==
The White Oak River runs through a variety of habitats including swamps, hardwood forests, and salt marsh flats. A wide variety of wildlife can be found in and around the river and its smaller river feeders. These creeks provide safe havens for many small animals such as, fish, snakes, frogs and many more animal as well as plant life. Along the river, there are reports of bald cypress trees over one thousand years of age. Many alligators can be found along the river.

In 2016, scientists from Uppsala University reported a new class of archaean microbes with rare chemosynthetic properties, Hadesarchaea, living in hot, low-oxygen environments near White Oak River. In the same year, a University of Texas-led team discovered a new archaen phylum, Thorarchaeota, from samples taken from the White Oak River estuary.

== See also ==
- List of North Carolina rivers
