= International Committee on Systematics of Prokaryotes =

The International Committee on Systematics of Prokaryotes (ICSP), formerly the International Committee on Systematic Bacteriology (ICSB), is the body that oversees the nomenclature of prokaryotes and determines the rules by which prokaryotes are named. The ICSP does not regulate taxonomy, it at most makes taxonomic recommendations. The Judicial Commission of the ICSP issues Opinions concerning matters of nomenclature, and the ICSP members vote on proposed revisions to the Prokaryotic Code, etc.

== Composition ==
The ICSP consists of members appointed by member societies of the International Union of Microbiological Societies (IUMS). They elect an Executive Board and the members of a judicial branch (Judicial Commission). In addition, the ICSP has a number of subcommittees on taxonomy dealing with issues regarding the nomenclature and taxonomy of specific groups of prokaryotes.

=== Subcommittees ===
The ICSP has a number of subcommittees dealing with issues regarding the nomenclature and taxonomy of specific groups of prokaryotes. These include (or included) the following:

- Aeromonadaceae, Vibrionaceae and related organisms
- Genera Agrobacterium and Rhizobium
- Bacillus and related organisms
- Bifidobacterium, Lactobacillus and related organisms
- Genus Brucella; Burkholderia, Ralstonia and related organisms
- Campylobacter and related bacteria
- Clostridia and Clostridium-like organisms
- Comamonadaceae and related organisms
- Family Enterobacteriaceae
- Flavobacterium- and Cytophaga-like bacteria
- Gram-negative anaerobic rods
- Family Halobacteriaceae
- Family Halomonadaceae
- Genus Leptospira
- Genus Listeria
- Methanogens
- Suborder Micrococcineae
- Families Micromonosporaceae, Streptosporangiaceae and Thermomonosporaceae
- Class Mollicutes
- Genus Mycobacterium
- Nocardia and related organisms
- Family Pasteurellaceae
- Photosynthetic prokaryotes
- Pseudomonas, Xanthomonas and related organisms
- Suborder Pseudonocardineae
- Staphylococci and streptococci
- Family Streptomycetaceae

Not all of these subcommittees may be active at present. They are overseen by the ICSP Secretary for Subcommittees.

== Publications ==
The ICSP is also integral to the production of the publication of the International Code of Nomenclature of Prokaryotes (Prokaryotic Code; formerly the International Code of Nomenclature of Bacteria, Bacteriological Code) and the International Journal of Systematic and Evolutionary Microbiology (IJSEM) (formerly the International Journal of Systematic Bacteriology, IJSB). IUMS had transferred the copyright for future versions of the International Code of Nomenclature of Bacteria (before it was renamed the International Code of Nomenclature of Prokaryotes) to the ICSP.
