= International Journal of Systematic and Evolutionary Microbiology =

- Discipline: Microbiology, systematics, evolutionary biology
- Language: English
- Edited by: Martha Trujillo

Publication details
- Former names: International Bulletin of Bacteriological Nomenclature and Taxonomy, International Journal of Systematic Bacteriology
- History: 1951–present
- Publisher: Microbiology Society
- Frequency: Monthly
- Open access: Delayed, after 12 months
- Impact factor: 2.0 (2024)

Standard abbreviations
- ISO 4: Int. J. Syst. Evol. Microbiol.

Indexing
- CODEN: ISEMF5
- ISSN: 1466-5026 (print); 1466-5034 (web)
- LCCN: 00252051
- OCLC no.: 807119723

Links
- Journal homepage; Online access; Online archive

The International Journal of Systematic and Evolutionary Microbiology is a peer-reviewed scientific journal covering research in the field of microbial systematics that was established in 1951. Its scope covers the taxonomy, nomenclature, identification, characterisation, culture preservation, phylogeny, evolution, and biodiversity of all microorganisms, including prokaryotes, yeasts and yeast-like organisms, protozoa and algae. The journal is currently published monthly by the Microbiology Society.

An official publication of the International Committee on Systematics of Prokaryotes (ICSP) and International Union of Microbiological Societies (Bacteriology and Applied Microbiology Division), the journal is the single official international forum for the publication of new species names for prokaryotes. In addition to research papers, the journal also publishes the minutes of meetings of the ICSP and its various subcommittees.

== Background and history ==
From the first identification of a bacterial species in 1872, microbial species were named according to the binomial nomenclature, based on largely subjective descriptive characteristics. By the end of the 19th century, however, it was clear that this nomenclature and classification system required reform. Although several different comprehensive nomenclature systems were invented (most notably, that described in Bergey's Manual of Determinative Bacteriology, first published in 1923), none gained international recognition. In 1930, a single international body, now named the International Committee on Systematics of Prokaryotes (ICSP), was established to oversee all aspects of prokaryotic nomenclature. Work began in 1936 on drafting a Code of Bacteriological Nomenclature, the first version of which was approved in 1947.

In 1950, at the 5th International Congress for Microbiology, a journal was established to disseminate the committee's conclusions to the microbiological community. It first appeared the following year under the title of International Bulletin of Bacteriological Nomenclature and Taxonomy. In 1980, the ICSP published an exhaustive list of all existing bacterial species considered valid in the Approved Lists of Bacterial Names. Thereafter, the committee's Code required all new names to be either published or indexed in its journal to be deemed valid.

The journal was at first published quarterly by Iowa State College Press, which later increased to bimonthly. In 1966, the journal was renamed the International Journal of Systematic Bacteriology. For decades, the journal's cover quoted Dutch naturalist Otto Friedrich Müller: "the sure and definite determination (of species of bacteria) requires so much time, so much acumen of eye and judgement, so much of perseverance and patience that there is hardly anything else so difficult." Between 1971 and the end of 1997, the journal was published by the American Society for Microbiology.

Publication moved to the United Kingdom in 1998, the journal being taken over by the Society for General Microbiology, in conjunction with Cambridge University Press. The title was changed to International Journal of Systematic and Evolutionary Microbiology in 2000, to reflect the broadened focus of the journal. A major redesign brought the journal into line with the three other society journals in 2003, and at the same date the printer/typesetter changed to the Charlesworth Group. The frequency increased to monthly in 2006.

== Role in nomenclature validation ==
The journal publishes research papers establishing novel prokaryotic names, which are summarized in a notification list. Each monthly issue also contains a compilation of validated new names (the validation list) that have been previously published in other scientific journals or books. Since August 2002, publications relating to new bacterial taxa and validation of publication elsewhere have both required type strains to have been deposited at two recognised public collections in different countries.

As of 2007, the journal has officially validated around 6500 species and 1500 genera. It was estimated in 2004 that over 300 new names had been published but not validated.

== Modern journal ==
As of 2017, the editor-in-chief is Martha E. Trujillo (University of Salamanca).

According to the Journal Citation Reports, the journal has a 2024 impact factor of 2.0.
