= White Rock Township =

White Rock Township may refer to:

- White Rock Township, Franklin County, Arkansas
- White Rock Township, Ogle County, Illinois
- White Rock Township, Lane County, Kansas
- White Rock Township, Republic County, Kansas
- White Rock Township, Smith County, Kansas
- White Rock Township, McDonald County, Missouri
- White Rock Township, Noble County, Oklahoma
- White Rock Township, Roberts County, South Dakota
