= Thorarchaeia =

"Thorarchaeia" Temporal range: Paleoproterozoic–Present

Scientific classification (Candidatus)
- Domain: Archaea
- Kingdom: Promethearchaeati
- Phylum: Promethearchaeota
- Class: "Thorarchaeia"

Class of Asgard archaea

"Thorarchaeia" is a class within the kingdom Promethearchaeati. The kingdom Promethearchaeati represents the closest prokaryotic relatives of eukaryotes. Since there is such a close relation between the two different domains, it provides further evidence for the two-domain tree of life theory which states that eukaryotes branched from the archaeal domain. Kingdom Promethearchaeati are single cell marine microbes that contain branch-like appendages and have genes that are similar to Eukarya. The kingdom Promethearchaeati is composed of "Thorarchaeia", Promethearchaeia, "Odinarchaeia", and "Heimdallarchaeia". "Thorarchaeia" were first identified from the sulfate-methane transition zone in tidewater sediments. "Thorarchaeia" are widely distributed in marine and freshwater sediments.

== Discovery ==
"Thorarchaeia" were discovered by analyzing estuary sediments obtained from the White Oak River in North Carolina. Estuaries are brackish bodies of water where fresh and marine water meet, providing a rich and unique area of nutrients. A PhD student at the University of Texas discovered new characteristics of "Thorarchaeia" that live under sediment and with anoxic properties. The graduate students further proved that the archaea aided in the degradation of organic matter, carbon fixation, and sulfur reduction. "Thorarchaeia" genomes that were obtained from the marine appeared to have diversity in metabolic pathways with the potential of degrading and uptaking proteins and carbohydrates.

== Description ==
"Thorarchaeia" have not been cultured in a laboratory. What is known about "Thorarchaeia" has come from analyzing partial and near complete genomes. 3,029 proteins have been sequenced from the partial genomes. These genomes contain genes that suggest that "Thorarchaeia" may have the ability to degrade organic matter, suggesting a role in the carbon cycle and an intermediate role in the sulfur cycle. Genes have been found for a near complete Wood-Ljungdahl pathway but lacked the genes for formate dehydrogenase. This could be due to having incomplete genomes. "Thorarchaeia" may use the tetrahydromethanopterin Wood-Ljungdahl pathway to reduce carbon dioxide. "Thorarchaeia" have genes for protein degradation and assimilation which include the genes clostripain and gingipain. They also have genes for extracellular peptidases. These genes may suggest that the main carbon source for "Thorarchaeia" is proteins and peptides. "Thorarchaeia" sequenced partial genomes also have the genes for glycolysis present. They are missing the genes for hexokinases; however, they have the genes for pyruvate kinases and phosphoenolpyruvate synthase. The presence of the genes for these enzymes may play a role in the ability to adapt to different environmental conditions. Genes have been found for nitrogen fixation in most samples containing the partial genomes; however, no genes for the nitrite reduction catalyzing enzymes have been found. Some of the sequenced partial genomes have near complete Calvin-Benson-Bassham pathways and have been found to use type IV RuBisCO. While other classes within the Promethearchaeati kingdom use type III and type IV RuBisCO, none have the Calvin-Benson-Bassham pathway.

== See also ==
- List of Archaea genera
