= Freyarchaeum =

"Candidatus Freyarchaeum"

Scientific classification (Candidatus)
- Domain: Archaea
- Kingdom: Promethearchaeati
- Phylum: Promethearchaeota
- Class: "Freyarchaeia"; Valentin-Alvarado et al. 2024
- Order: "Freyarchaeales"; Valentin-Alvarado et al. 2024
- Family: "Freyarchaeaceae"; Valentin-Alvarado et al. 2024
- Genus: "Ca. Freyarchaeum" Valentin-Alvarado et al. 2024
- Species: "Ca. Freyarchaeum deiterrae"

Binomial name
- "Ca. Freyarchaeum deiterrae" Valentin-Alvarado et al. 2024

Genus of Asgard archaea

"Candidatus Freyarchaeum" is a genus of Asgard archaea.
