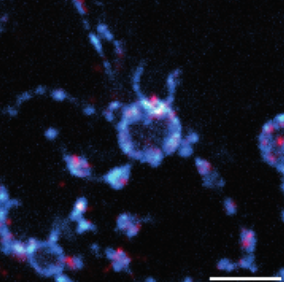
- HCR-FISH image of a Heimdallarchaeia cell, displaying distinct protrusions

Scientific classification (Candidatus)
- Domain: Archaea
- Kingdom: Promethearchaeati
- Phylum: Promethearchaeota
- Class: "Candidatus Heimdallarchaeia"; Zaremba-Niedzwiedzka et al., 2017

Orders
- "Candidatus Hodarchaeales" Liu et al., 2021; "Candidatus Heimdallarchaeales" Wu et al., 2022; "Candidatus Gerdarchaeales" Cai et al., 2020; "Candidatus Wenzhongarchaeales" Zhang et al., 2025

Synonyms
- "Candidatus Heimdallarchaeota" Zaremba-Niedzwiedzka et al., 2017

= Heimdallarchaeia =

"Candidatus Heimdallarchaeia"

Class of archaea related to eukaryotes

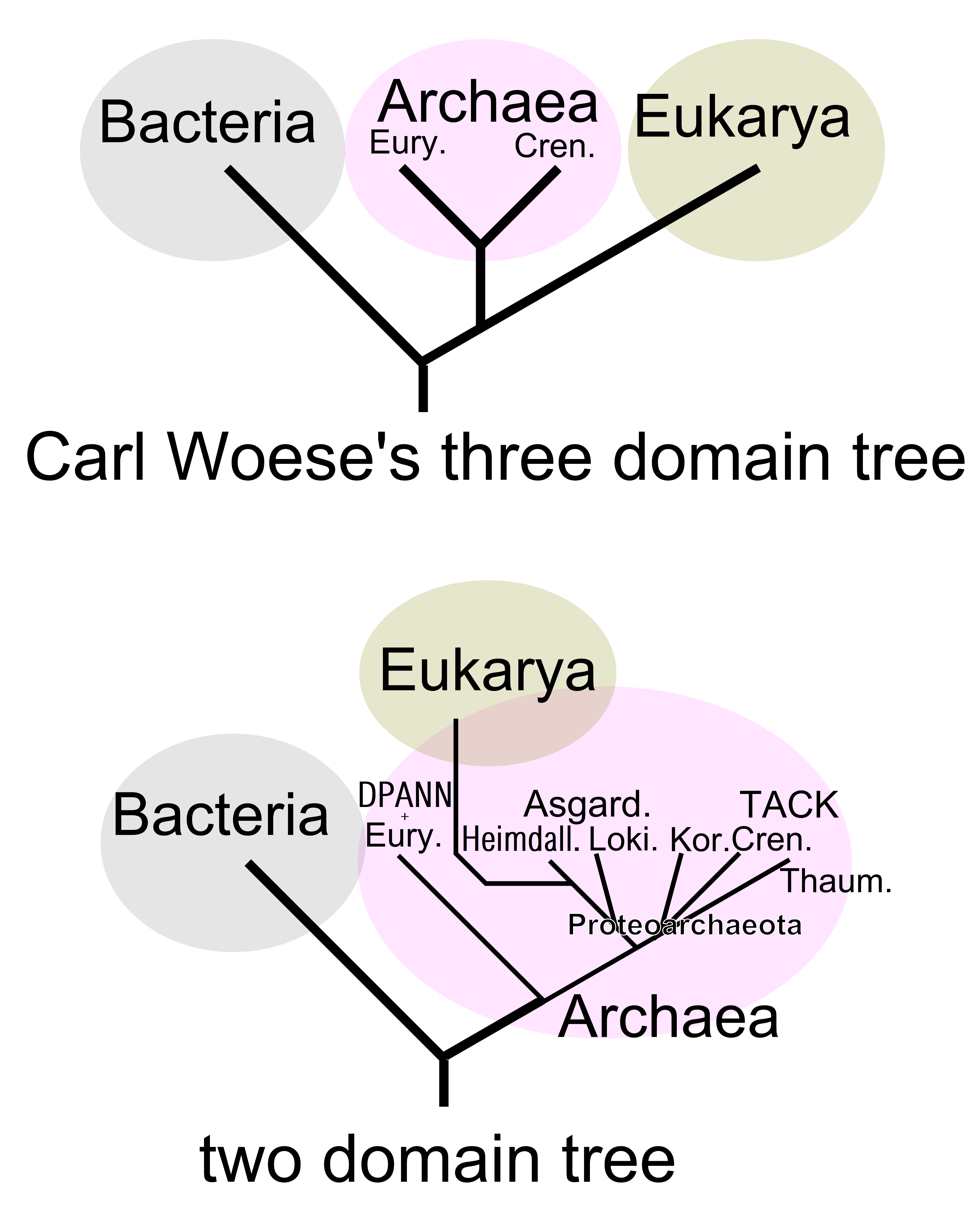
Two-domain system

Heimdallarchaeia (also known as "Candidatus Heimdallarchaeota") is a class of archaea within the phylum Promethearchaeota. Heimdallarchaeia are thought to be the closest relative of eukaryotes, making it a focus of research into eukaryogenesis. Knowledge of the group derives primarily from metagenome-assembled genomes (MAGs) and environmental sequencing.

== Discovery ==
Heimdallarchaeia was described in 2017 by Uppsala University researchers, alongside three other new archaeal lineages, Odinarchaeia, Thorarchaeia, and Lokiarchaeia, establishing the Asgard superphylum. The genomic sequences were recovered from metagenomic samples collected at multiple sites, including sediments from Loki's Castle hydrothermal vent. The class is named after Heimdall, the Norse god who guards the Bifrost bridge between realms.

Two of three original Lokiarchaeum metagenome bins from the 2015 study by Spang et al. (designated Loki2 and Loki3) were subsequently reclassified as "Heimdallarchaeote LC_2" and "Heimdallarchaeote LC_3".

== Taxonomy and classification ==
Heimdallarchaeia holds Candidatus status because no member has been isolated in pure culture, meaning the group cannot be formally described under the International Code of Nomenclature of Prokaryotes. The original publication proposed it at the phylum level as "Candidatus Heimdallarchaeota", but subsequent taxonomic revisions reclassified it as a class within the phylum Asgardarchaeota. Within the Genome Taxonomy Database, several orders are recognised within Heimdallarchaeia, including Hodarchaeales, Heimdallarchaeales, Kariarchaeales, and the informally designated Gerdarchaeales. The placement of a further lineage, Njordarchaeales, within Heimdallarchaeia is uncertain, as some associate it more closely with TACK, and there may be substantial horizontal gene transfer in Njordarchaeales.

The precise relationship of Heimdallarchaeia to eukaryotes is debated, and eukarya may be contained within the Heimdallarchaeia, with some taxonomies placing them as a sister taxon of Hodarchaelas. Another, more recent possibility is that eukarya are a sister taxon of Heimdallarchaeia itself.

Examples of proposed taxonomies
Eme et al., 2023.

- Heimdallarchaeia
  - - - - Heimdallarchaeaceae
        - Kariarchaeaceae
      - Gerdarchaeales
    - Njordarchaeales
  - - Eukarya
    - Hodarchaeales

Zhang et al., 2025.

- Asgard archaea
  - Eukarya
  - Heimdallarchaeia
    - - Wenzhongarchaeales
      - Hodarchaeales
    - - Wukongarchaeales
      - - Gerdarchaeales
        - - Kariarchaeaceae
          - Heimdallarchaeaceae

GTDB release 11-RS232 (15th April 2026).

- - - "Wukongarchaeia"
      - "Wukongarchaeales"
        "Wukongarchaeaceae"
  - - "Njordarchaeia"
      - "Njordarchaeales"
        - "Njordarchaeaceae"
        - "Panguiarchaeaceae"
    - "Heimdallarchaeia"
      - - "Hodarchaeales"
          "Hodarchaeaceae"
      - - "Gerdarchaeales" (JABLTI01)
        - - "Heimdallarchaeales"
            - "Kariarchaeaceae"
            - "Heimdallarchaeaceae"

== Biology ==
Heimdallarchaeia are less abundant than Odinarchaeia or Promethearchaeaceae, but nonetheless can be found in many habitats including estuaries, marine sediments, hydrothermal vents, and the water column of the open ocean. Heimdallarchaeia seem to thrive in microxic environments, and both aerobic and nitrate respiration are present.

Heimdallarchaeia have complex internal structures for prokaryotes, like other Asgard archaea. Hodoarchaeles sampled from the Aarhus Bay show unusually large and elongate cell morphologies, exceeding 5 μm in length. Heimdallarchaeia from Australia contain numerous intracellular vesicles, possibly relevant in nutrient exchange. Such vesicles may be precursors of the membrane-bound organelles of eukaryotes.

Long protrusions, similar to those in Promethearchaeum, have been recorded in at least three species. Formed by cytoskeletal filaments, these structures facilitate a syntrophic relationship with other prokaryotes, namely methanogens. Syntrophy has been long hypothesized to be relevant to eukaryogenesis, and similar syntrophy with an Alphaproteobacteria may have led to symbiogenesis.

Heimdallarchaeia encode numerous eukaryotic signature proteins, including homologues of ESCRT and proteins involved in the ubiquitin modifier system. Among all Asgard lineages, Heimdallarchaeia encode the highest count of signature proteins, with 31 identified (compared to 28 for Lokiarchaeia, 25 for Thorarchaeia and Odinarchaeia) from a reference set of 38 eukaryote-specific protein families.

The 2017 description reported that Heimdallarchaeia possess histones with N-terminal tails resembling eukaryotic core histone tails, at the time thought to be unique to eukaryotes. Structural characterisation of a profilin encoded by Heimdallarchaeota LC3 demonstrated that it adopts a canonical profilin fold, binds polyproline motifs, and that its activity is regulated by phosphoinositides, closely paralleling the behaviour of eukaryotic profilins.

== See also ==
- Asgardarchaeota
- Eukaryogenesis
- List of Archaea genera
- Lokiarchaeia
- Two-domain system
