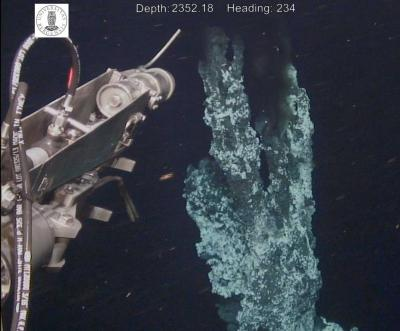
- Loki's Castle

Scientific classification (Candidatus)
- Domain: Archaea
- Kingdom: Promethearchaeati
- Phylum: Promethearchaeota
- Class: "Candidatus Odinarchaeia"; Tamarit et al. 2022

Orders
- "Odinarchaeales"; "Yangjianarchaeales"

= Odinarchaeia =

"Candidatus Odinarchaeia"

Class of thermophilic Asgard archaea

"Candidatus Odinarchaeia" (informally Odinarchaeia) is a class of uncultured archaea within the phylum Promethearchaeota, itself within the kingdom Promethearchaeati or Asgard archaea. All known members still remain known exclusively from metagenome-assembled genomes.

== Taxonomy ==
Odinarchaeia was described in 2017 Uppsala University researchers as a founding lineage of the Asgard superphylum, alongside Candidatus Lokiarchaeia, Candidatus Thorarchaeia, and Candidatus Heimdallarchaeia, discovered in genomes assembled from samples from Loki's Castle. The class is named after Odin, as with the rest of the Norse-themed nomenclature across Asgard lineages. Phylogenomic analyses using the Genome Taxonomy Database supported the assignment of Odinarchaeia to the rank of class. As of 2026 Odinarchaeia is listed as a class. The Asgard superphylum has since been reclassified as the kingdom Promethearchaeati.

- Order "Odinarchaeales" Tamarit et al. 2022 and National Center for Biotechnology Information (NCBI).
  - Family "Odinarchaeaceae" Tamarit et al. 2022
    - Genus "Candidatus Odinarchaeum" Tamarit et al. 2022
      - Species "Ca. O. yellowstonii" Tamarit et al. 2022

== Ecology ==
Odinarchaeia are thermophiles. In the study that established the class, metagenomic contigs assigned to Odinarchaeota were recovered exclusively from hot spring environments, Yellowstone National Park and the Radiata Pool in New Zealand. This distinguishes Odinarchaeia from other Asgard classes. Subsequent broader surveys have additionally reported Odinarchaeia-affiliated sequences from subsurface coastal and marine habitats.

== Analysis ==
The type is Candidatus Odinarchaeum yellowstonii, named after its sampling site in Yellowstone. Its genome was originally assembled from a MAG as a single circular chromosome of 1.46 Mbp in 9 contigs.

Like other Asgard archaea, the Ca. Odinarchaeum LCB_4 genome encodes eukaryotic signature proteins, consistent with the proposed close evolutionary relationship between Asgard archaea and eukaryotes. The LCB_4 genome encodes both a tubulin-like gene and two FtsZ homologues simultaneously, a combination not identified in other Asgardarchaeota.

== Viruses ==
Analysis of CRISPR spacers in the closed yellowstonii genome identified targets in putative viral contigs recovered from the same metagenomic assembly, enabling characterization of the first Asgard archaeal viruses. Additional viruses inferred to infect Odinarchaeia have been identified through broader metagenomic CRISPR spacer matching, including members distantly related to Caudoviricetes and to tailless capsid viruses of the realm Varidnaviria.

== See also ==
- List of Archaea genera
- Lokiarchaea
- Heimdallarchaeia
- Asgardareia
