= Candidatus =

Indication in bacteriological nomenclature

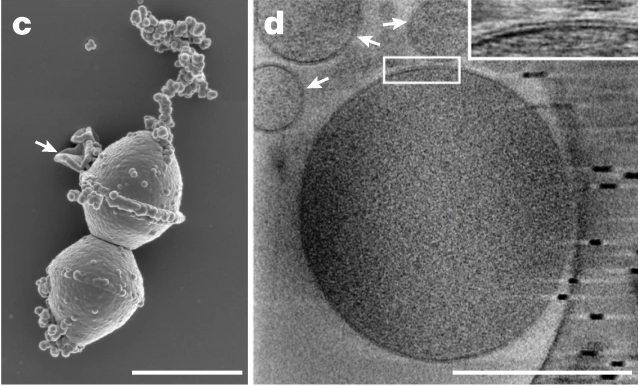
Promethearchaeum syntrophicum cells dividing under SEM (c). Cryo-electron tomography image of a single cell (d). White arrows indicate large membrane vesicles. Scale bar = 1 μm (c) and 500 μm (d)

In prokaryote nomenclature, Candidatus (abbreviated Ca.; Latin for 'candidate of Roman office') is used to name prokaryotic taxa that are well characterized but yet-uncultured. Contemporary sequencing approaches, such as 16S ribosomal RNA sequencing or metagenomics, provide much information about the analyzed organisms and thus allow identification and characterization of individual species. However, the majority of prokaryotic species remain uncultivable and hence inaccessible for further characterization in in vitro study. The recent discoveries of a multitude of candidate taxa has led to candidate phyla radiation expanding the tree of life through the new insights in bacterial diversity.

Candidatus species' full names are conventionally written inside of double quotation marks (e.g., "Ca. M. multicellularis").

== Nomenclature ==
=== History ===
The initial International Code of Nomenclature of Prokaryotes (ICNP) as well as early revisions did not account for the possibility of identifying prokaryotes which were not yet cultivable. This was in apparent conflict with the ICNP's stated scope, which was to be "prokaryotes", not just cultivated ones. Therefore, the term Candidatus was proposed in the context of a conference of the International Committee on Systematics of Prokaryotes, (ICSP, formerly International Committee on Systematic Bacteriology) in 1994 to initiate code revision. Owing to rising numbers of Candidatus taxa associated with ongoing advances of sequencing technologies, the ICSP adopted the International Code of Nomenclature of Prokaryotes in 1996 by adding an appendix for Candidatus taxa (Appendix 11 in the most recent version). However, until 2024, the nomenclature of Candidatus taxa was not covered by the general rules of the Prokaryotic Code, leading to ongoing discussions and proposals for changing the current code in order to grant priority to Candidatus taxa.

Another way through which a prokaryotic name cannot be validly published under the ICNP, since 2001, is that it does not meet the Rule 30 requirement of "viable cultures of the type strain, in two culture collections, in different countries". This ensures the quality and accessibility of the type strain, but it can be difficult to follow in practice: for example, moving cultures across national borders requires interacting with Nagoya Protocol regulations. In addition, a few names have been found to be invalid after the fact due to violation of Rule 30. The 2024 change to the ICNP expands the scope of Candidatus to includes this kind of cases: a pro-validly published name can be typified by a live culture not meeting Rule 30 or a preserved culture.

=== Naming ===
Currently, the provisional status "Candidatus" may be used if the following information is provided:

1. Genomic information [...] to determine the phylogenetic position of the organism.
2. All information so far available on:
  1. structure and morphology
  2. physiology and metabolism
  3. reproductive features
  4. the natural environment in which the organism can be identified and
  5. any other available and suitable information.

The species name of an organism in the status of Candidatus consists of the word Candidatus, followed by an either a genus name with a specific epithet, or only a genus name, or only a specific epithet. Examples include "Candidatus Liberobacter asiaticum"; "Candidatus Magnetobacterium". A list of all Candidatus taxa (a Candidatus List) is kept by the Judicial Commission of the ICSP in cooperation with the editorial board of the IJSEM and is updated at appropriate intervals. Once a Candidatus taxon has been cultivated successfully, the name has to be removed from this list and a new name has to be proposed in accordance with the International Code of Nomenclature of Prokaryotes.

Although the 1994 proposal and the later Code call for a Candidatus List to be maintained, work on curating names did not start until 2017, when a "No. 0" trial is published. The author found that 120 of the ~400 collected names would breach the Code should they become formally proposed. Common reasons are Latin errors, duplicate names, and non-Latin names. As a result, Candidatus Lists now also offer corrections for such names. Corrected names are given corrig. (for corrigendum) in the authority field, with some sources going further to cite the correction (e.g. "Ca. Karelsulcia" corrig. Moran et al. 2005 in Ogen et al. 2020). Each published list, starting from No. 1, covers all known Candidatus names proposed in a given time period, plus any addendum for previous periods. As of December 2022, the latest is Candidatus List No. 4, published November 2022, covering names proposed in 2021. An unnumbered list was published in 2023 to deal with Candidatus phyla; future numbered lists will include phyla.

=== SeqCode ===
The Code of Nomenclature of Prokaryotes Described from Sequence Data (SeqCode) of 2022 standardizes the publication of names in a system separate from the ICNP. Instead of requiring a type culture, the SeqCode requires a high-quality genome as the nomenclatural type, in effect offering a route to formalizing Candidatus names. It is produced by the International Society for Microbial Ecology (ISME), which is unrelated to the ICSP. The SeqCode recognizes the priority of names, including Candidatus ones, published under ICNP before 2023.

The SeqCode team initially wished to simply amend the ICNP to add such a system, but ICSP rejected the petition, necessitating the creation of a separate code.

The use of a genome sequence as the type material is useful not only for not-yet-cultured prokaryotes. A genome sequence is more stable than a cell culture, which can be (and has been) lost and are subject to genetic drift under the different selective pressure of the lab. In addition, the ICNP requires a type strain to be stored in two separate culture collections if a name is to be proposed (including new combinations, i.e. renames), which makes it hard to correct the name of some wrongly-categorized species.

=== Pro-valid publication ===
Bacteriologists from several different institutions wrote a new proposal for the ICNP to govern Candidatus names using genome sequences in 2024, providing a detailed analysis of the incompatibility of the Whitman proposal and SeqCode with the ICNP followed by a plan that avoids the reasons for the rejection of Whitman's proposal but satisfies his goals.

The ICSP accepted the proposal in the same year. With this change, Candidatus names can be "pro-validly published" and become "pro-legitimate" and "pro-correct". This requires the name to meet most existing requirements for valid publication (and analogously for legitimacy and correctness), except the culture deposition in Rule 30 can be replaced by a living culture not meeting the requirements of Rule 30, a preserved specimen, a sequenced genome deposited on the INSDC, or a single-gene sequence deposited to the INSDC. Pro-legitimate Candidatus names compete with each other for priority, but do not compete with legitimate names.

== Uncultivability ==
=== Environmental factors ===
There are several reasons for why many prokaryotic species do not grow in the lab, many of which remain poorly understood. One of these reasons is the environment the species are recovered from, which can be difficult to simulate in laboratory conditions. Many prokaryotes have highly specific growth requirements including the need for a specific nutrient composition, specific pH conditions, temperatures, atmospheric pressure or levels of oxygen. Most commercially available growth media and incubation protocols poorly met these requirements making a comprehensive habitat assessment necessary in order to successfully isolate the bacteria of interest from environmental samples.

=== Species interaction ===
Most prokaryotic species do not live alone but rather in complex communities with other species from all kingdoms of life. As a consequence, many species depend on metabolites or signaling compounds of their neighboring species for their own cell growth. The identification of the required substances can be challenging, but once identified a co-cultivation or addition of the specific compound can be used to potentially cultivate the species of interest.

=== Genome reduction ===
Many instances of species interaction are of symbiotic nature which is defined as an intimate, long-term relationship between two or more species which can be either mutualistic, neutral or harmful. Depending on the location of the symbiont, the symbionts can be either ectosymbionts or endosymbionts. Drastic genome reduction through gene deletions has been observed in endosymbiotic bacteria, which is thought to be because many genes become unnecessary in the sheltered host environment. This frequently affects genes for DNA repair and transcriptional regulation which makes it difficult to cultivate these organisms outside their host.

== Typography ==
Candidatus or Ca. is italicized. The name that follows is not italicized. The whole name is wrapped in double quotation marks. Example: "Candidatus Phytoplasma", "Ca. Phytoplasma allocasuarinae".

== See also ==
- Candidate division
- Glossary of scientific naming
- International Code of Nomenclature of Bacteria
- List of taxa with candidatus status
- Undescribed taxon
