= Geology of Jan Mayen =

The geology of Jan Mayen is part of the larger Jan Mayen Ridge — an undersea volcanic ridge that forms the boundary of the Iceland Plateau to the northeast — at the junction of the Mohns Ridge section with the Jan Mayen Fracture Zone that crosses it at approximately 90 degrees. North of the island, the sea floor slopes steeply, plunging a depth of greater than two kilometers in the vicinity of Jan Mayen Rift Zone. The region is highly tectonically active, at the junction of the European and American plates. This activity produces volcanism and earthquakes on the island itself. Beerenberg, a 2,277-meter-tall (7,470 ft) volcano rises on the north end of the island, covered in more than 20 glaciers.

Jan Mayen is made up of basalt flows and pyroclastic flow related mafic deposits. The two most recent eruptions were in 1970 and 1985, although the Central Crater and Egg Island craters on the southern side of the mountain have continuous fumarole activity. Tectonic geologists have identified Jan Mayen as a microcontinent, which has experienced significant deformation around its boundaries due to sea-floor spreading and the formation of new plate boundaries since the Paleocene, with full separation as a microcontinent in the Oligocene. A model published in 2009 suggests a failed ridge offshore oriented toward the Faroe Islands and the Aegir Ridge extending northeast of Jan Mayen.
