= Lokiarchaeum primum =

Candidatus Lokiarchaeum primum

Scientific classification (Candidatus)
- Domain: Archaea
- Kingdom: Promethearchaeati
- Phylum: Promethearchaeota
- Class: Promethearchaeia
- Order: Promethearchaeales
- Family: Promethearchaeaceae
- Genus: Candidatus Lokiarchaeum
- Species: Ca. L. primum

Binomial name
- Candidatus Lokiarchaeum primum Spang et al. 2015

Currently uncultured deep-sea archaeal species

Species-level cladogram of all named species within the order Promethearchaeales (topology based on Nobs et al.,2026).

Candidatus Lokiarchaeum primum, synonym Lokiarchaeon, is a currently uncultured deep-sea archaeal species. Discovered in marine sediment near the Loki's Castle deep-sea vent, Lokiarchaeon is believed to be a close ancestor of eukaryotes. An anaerobic lithoautotroph, it is believed to share key traits with eukaryotes, forming the basis for the Asgard archaea systematic grouping.

== Taxonomic classification ==
Initial metagenomic analysis found Lokiarchaeon most closely related to eukaryotic lineages. Large-scale metagenomic analysis further categorized Lokiarchaeon as Asgard archaea, a grouping of archaeal lineages possessing key eukaryotic proteins, suggesting that eukaryotes diverged from Asgard archaea. Lokiarchaeum is believed to share a common ancestor with eukaryotes. More specifically, Lokiarchaeon is a member of the Deep-Sea Archaeal Group within the Asgard archaea, a sister group to the TACK (Thaumarchaeota, Aigarchaeota, Crenarchaeota, and Korarchaeota) archaeal superphylum. As determined from phylogenies built on conserved ribosomal proteins, Candidatus Lokiarchaeum ossiferum is considered the closest known species relative of Lokiarchaeon.

== Discovery ==
Lokiarchaeon was discovered by researchers Aja Spang, Jimmy H. Saw, Steffen L. Jørgensen, Katarzyna Zaremba-Niedzwiedzka, Joran Martjin, Anders E. Lind, Roel Van Eijk, Christa Schleper, Lionel Guy, and Thijs J. G. Ettema. While investigating the microbial diversity of deep-sea sediments near the Arctic Mid-Ocean Ridge, researchers extracted 16S rRNA gene sequences from an unknown species of Deep-Sea Archaea. Sequences were gathered from a gravity core sample, a geological sampling technique used to extract a "core" of deep-sea sediment, located about 15 km from the active hydrothermal vent site, Loki's Castle. Acquired in the summer of 2010, samples were immediately collected for analysis, with the core stored for later use once the team reached port. The researchers used methods such as metagenomic sequencing, single-gene phylogenies, and binning of selected metagenomes to discover Lokiarchaeon.

== Physiology and morphology ==
Although uncultured in a laboratory setting, the Lokiarchaeon metagenome encodes eukaryotic signature proteins (ESPs) that have been traditionally associated with eukaryotes. Upon its discovery, Lokiarchaeon was predicted to possess enzymes of the broad class of GTPases, membrane-bound transport vesicles, and an actin-based cytoskeleton, necessary for intracellular nutrient transport, movement, and structural integrity. While the exact morphology of Lokiarchaeon is unknown, isolated cultures of close Asgard archaea relatives Ca. L. ossiferum, Promethearchaeum syntrophicum, and Nerearchaeum marumarumayae have small, coccoid cell bodies with extracellular protrusions and vesicle formation, traits that the uncultured Lokiarchaeon can potentially share.

== Genomics ==
The Lokiarchaeon genome has only been sequenced from metagenomic analysis, not from pure culture. Thus, the "composite" genome sequence is not considered "complete" and contains some genetic information from related strains. The genome is 5.1 megabase pairs with 5413 genes, of which 5384 encode proteins. About 30% of each of the two Lokiarchaeon lineage genome sequences determined from the metagenomic analysis were either G or C nucleotide bases. Of all Lokiarchaeon proteins, 26% were similar to other archaeal proteins and 29% were similar to other bacterial proteins. 32% of proteins were unique to Lokiarchaeon, while 3.3% were related to eukaryotic proteins such as ubiquitin, GTPases, and proteins required for endosome formation.

== Metabolism ==
Organisms in the Lokiarchaeum family are considered organoheterotrophs that extract energy from carbohydrates. Lokiarchaeon in deep-sea samples were found to be lithoautotrophic anaerobes, using hydrogen and carbon dioxide to synthesize acetate for energy production. This finding supports previous evidence suggesting that Lokiarchaeon uses hydrogen to reduce CO_{2} to CH_{3} in early stages of acetate synthesis. According to metagenome assemblies of Asgard phyla, Lokiarchaeon is suggested to synthesize lipids. Based on observed co-cultures of other Asgard archaea with bacteria, it is possible Lokiarchaeon engages in syntrophic relationships with bacteria, potentially allowing it to degrade amino acids and exchange metabolites such as H_{2} (a product of fermentative metabolism).

== Ecology ==
Discovered in Arctic deep-sea vent sediment, Lokiarchaeon is one of the most common Asgard archaea in high-salinity marine sediment environments. Aside from the deep-sea environment of Loki's Castle, the Lokiarchaeon family has been found in salt lagoons in Baja California, in a wide pH range of 5-9. As part of the Asgards, Lokiarchaeon likely co-occurs with other microbes. The Lokiarchaeon family's proliferation in subsurface sediment has been attributed to the physical protection the niche provides, favoring slow growth and cell division, and protecting the structures of cell protrusions.

== Significance for eukaryogenesis ==
The discovery of Ca. L. primum implicates a highly complex archaeon as the eukaryotic ancestor. Supported by the identification of Lokiarchaeon ESPs, phylogenetic studies of Lokiarchaeon have clearly established that eukaryotes originated from an Asgard archaeal ancestor within the Archaea domain. This new phylogeny presents a paradigm shift away from the three-domain model of life (Eukarya, Archaea, and Bacteria) towards the two-domain model that eliminates Eukarya as a unique domain, given its Asgard archaeal ancestor. Based on the discovery of Lokiarchaeon and Asgard archaea, models for eukaryogenesis fundamentally involve an Asgard archaeon engulfing an alphaproteobacterium that evolved into modern mitochondria. Asgard ESPs, particularly the actin cytoskeleton, might have been necessary for the mechanism of endosymbiosis of the mitochondrial ancestor, thus paving the way for the acquisition of key eukaryotic traits. Current discourse centers on the timeline of eukaryogenesis, i.e., whether an archaeon acquired the mitochondrial ancestor early or late in eukaryote evolution. Despite general consensus on the two-domain model, there is some debate that the Lokiarchaeon phylogeny suffers from tree-building errors as a result of missing taxa, supporting the three-domain model.
