= List of volcanoes in Norway =

This is a list of active and extinct (or non-active) volcanoes in Norway.

Name	Elevation		Location	Last eruption
Name	meters	feet	Coordinates	Last eruption
Bouvet Island
Olavtoppen	780	2600	54.42°S 3.39°E	-
Wilhelmplatået	-	-	-	-
Jan Mayen
Beerenberg	2277	7470	71.08°N 8.17°W	1985
Sør-Jan	-	-	-	-
Mainland Norway
Fen (extinct)	-	-	59.26°N 9.27°E	-
Peter I Island
Lars Christensen Peak	1640	5380	68°50′S 90°37′W	-
Svalbard
Sverrefjellet	506	1660	79.43°N 13.3°E	-
