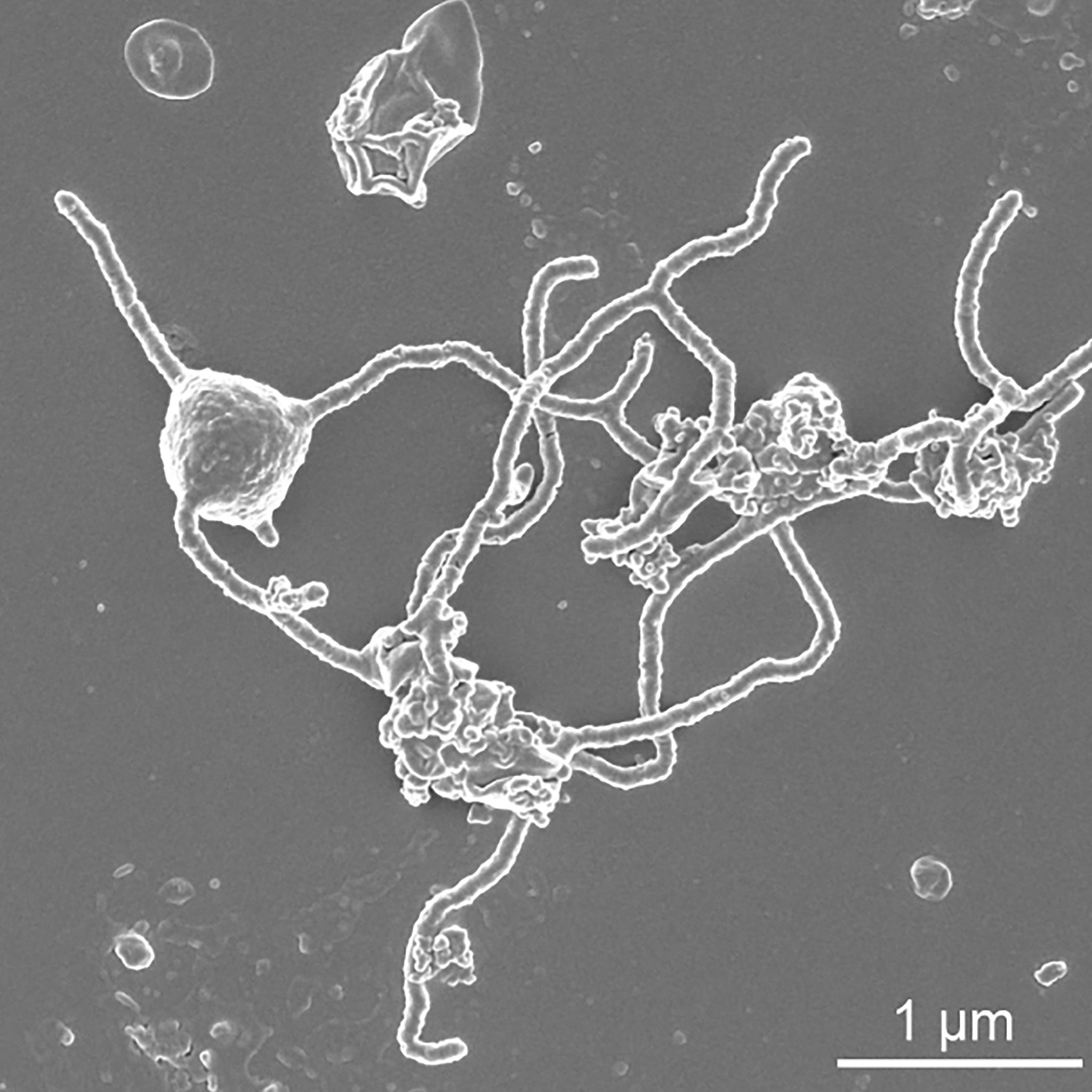
- SEM image of Promethearchaeum syntrophicum

Scientific classification
- Domain: Archaea
- Kingdom: Promethearchaeati
- Phylum: Promethearchaeota
- Class: Promethearchaeia
- Order: Promethearchaeales; Imachi et al., 2024
- Family: Promethearchaeaceae; Imachi et al., 2024

Genera
- "Ca. Harpocratesius"; "Ca. Lokiarchaeum"; "Ca. Nerearchaeum"; Promethearchaeum

Synonyms
- "Lokiarchaeaceae" Vanwonterghem et al. 2016

= Promethearchaeaceae =

Promethearchaeaceae Temporal range: Neoarchean–Present

Family of Asgard archaea

Promethearchaeaceae (previously called "Lokiarchaeota") is a family of the kingdom Promethearchaeati, the kingdom from which the eukaryotes emerged. The family includes all members of the group previously named Deep Sea Archaeal Group, also known as Marine Benthic Group B. A phylogenetic analysis disclosed a monophyletic grouping of the Promethearchaeaceae with the eukaryotes. The analysis revealed several genes with cell membrane-related functions. The presence of such genes support the hypothesis of an archaeal host for the emergence of the eukaryotes: the eocyte-like scenarios.

Promethearchaeaceae was introduced in 2015 after the identification of a candidate genome in a metagenomic analysis of a mid-oceanic sediment sample. This analysis suggests the existence of a genus of unicellular life dubbed "Candidatus Lokiarchaeum". The sample was taken near a hydrothermal vent at a vent field known as Loki's Castle located at the bend between Mohns/Knipovich ridge in the Arctic Ocean.

== Discovery ==
Sediments from a gravity core taken in 2010 in the rift valley on the Knipovich ridge in the Arctic Ocean, near the so-called Loki's Castle hydrothermal vent site, were analysed. Specific sediment horizons, previously shown to contain high abundances of novel archaeal lineages were subjected to metagenomic analysis. Due to the low density of cells in the sediment, the resulting genetic sequence does not come from an isolated cell, as would be the case in conventional analysis, but is rather a combination of genetic fragments. The result was a 92% complete, 1.4 fold-redundant composite genome named "Ca. Lokiarchaeum".

The metagenomic analysis determined the presence of an organism's genome in the sample. However, the organism itself was not cultured until years later, with a Japanese group first reporting isolation and cultivation of a Promethearchaeaceae strain in 2019. Since this initial cultivation of Promethearchaeaceae, members of the family have been reported in a diverse range of habitats. Advances in both long and short-read technologies for DNA sequencing have also aided in the recovery and identification of Promethearchaeaceae from microbial samples.

The Promethearchaeaceae family was proposed based on phylogenetic analyses using a set of highly conserved protein-coding genes. Through a reference to the hydrothermal vent complex from which the first genome sample originated, the name refers to Loki, the Norse shape-shifting god. The Loki of literature has been described as "a staggeringly complex, confusing, and ambivalent figure who has been the catalyst of countless unresolved scholarly controversies", a coincidental analogy to the role of Promethearchaeaceae in debates about the origin of eukaryotes.

== Description ==
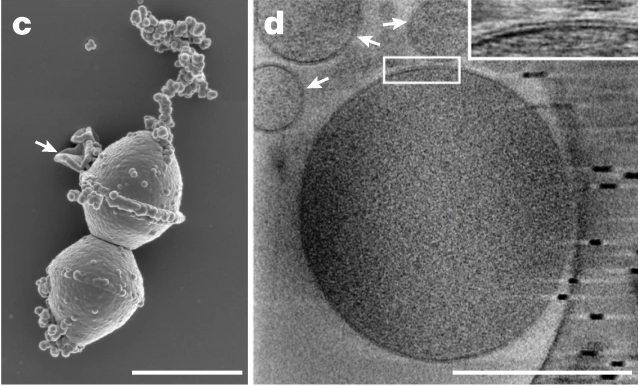
Promethearchaeum syntrophicum. (c) SEM of a dividing cell. Scale bar = 1 μm. (d) Cryo-EM of a single cell. Scale bar = 500 nm. White arrows indicate large membrane vesicles.

The "Ca. Lokiarchaeum" composite genome consists of 5,381 protein coding genes. Of these, roughly 32% do not correspond to any known protein, 26% closely resemble archaeal proteins, and 29% correspond to bacterial proteins.

A small, but significant portion of the proteins (175, 3.3%) that the recovered genes code for are very similar to eukaryotic proteins. These proteins included homologs of cytoskeleton proteins, GTPases, and the oligosaccharyltransferase (OST) protein complex. Homologues for components of the endosomal sorting complex required for transport and the ubiquitin protein modifier system were also identified in Promethearchaeaceae genome analysis. Sample contamination is an unlikely explanation for the unusual proteins because the recovered genes were always flanked by prokaryotic genes and no genes of known eukaryotic origin were detected in the metagenome from which the composite genome was extracted. Further, previous phylogenetic analysis suggested the genes in question had their origin at the base of the eukaryotic clades.

In eukaryotes, the function of these shared proteins include cell membrane deformation, cell shape formation, and a dynamic protein cytoskeleton. Eukaryotic protein functions found in Promethearchaeaceae also include intracellular transport mechanisms. It is inferred then that "Ca. Lokiarchaeum" may have some of these abilities. Another shared protein, actin, is essential for phagocytosis in eukaryotes. Phagocytosis is the ability to engulf and consume another particle; such ability would facilitate the endosymbiotic origin of mitochondria and chloroplasts, which is a key difference between prokaryotes and eukaryotes. The formation of the mitochondria is believed to be a key factor for the evolution of multicellularity. The presence of actin proteins and intracellular transport mechanisms provides evidence for the common ancestry between ancient Promethearchaeaceae and Eukarya.

== Evolutionary significance ==
A schematic evolutionary tree of the archaea including Promethearchaeaceae and the root of eukaryotes

53 marker proteins based GTDB 11-RS232

- Promethearchaeaceae
  - Promethearchaeum syntrophicum Imachi et al. 2024
  - - "Ca. Harpocratesius repetitus" Wu et al. 2022
    - - "Ca. Lokiarchaeum"
        - "Ca. L. primum" Spang et al. 2015
        - "Ca. L. ossiferum" Rodrigues-Oliveira et al. 2023

Species-level cladogram of all named species within the order Promethearchaeales (topology based on Nobs et al.,2026).

A comparative analysis of the "Ca. Lokiarchaeum" genome against known genomes resulted in a phylogenetic tree that showed a monophyletic group composed of the Promethearchaeaceae and the eukaryotes, supporting an archaeal host or eocyte-like scenarios for the emergence of the eukaryotes. The repertoire of membrane-related functions of "Ca. Lokiarchaeum" suggests that the common ancestor to the eukaryotes might be an intermediate step between the prokaryotic cells, devoid of subcellular structures, and the eukaryotic cells, which harbor many organelles.

Carl Woese's three-domain system classifies cellular life into three domains: archaea, bacteria, and eukaryotes; the last being characterised by large, highly evolved cells, containing mitochondria, which help the cells produce ATP (adenosine triphosphate, the energy currency of the cell), and a membrane-bound nucleus containing nucleic acids. Protozoa and all multicellular organisms such as animals, fungi, and plants are eukaryotes.

The bacteria and archaea are thought to be the most ancient of lineages, as fossil strata bearing the chemical signature of archaeal lipids have been dated back to 3.8 billion years ago. The eukaryotes include all complex cells and almost all multicellular organisms. They are thought to have evolved between 1.6 and 2.1 billion years ago. While the evolution of eukaryotes is considered to be an event of great evolutionary significance, no intermediate forms or "missing links" had been discovered previously. In this context, the discovery of "Ca. Lokiarchaeum", with some but not all of the characteristics of eukaryotes, provides evidence on the transition from archaea to eukaryotes. Promethearchaeaceae and the eukaryotes probably share a common ancestor, and if so, diverged roughly two billion years ago. Evidence for common ancestry, rather than an evolutionary shift from Promethearchaeaceae to eukaryotes, is found in analysis of fold superfamilies (FSFs). Fold superfamilies are evolutionarily defined domains of protein structure. It is estimated that there are around 2500 total FSFs found in nature. Utilization of Venn diagrams allowed researchers to depict distributions of FSFs of those that were shared by Archaea and Eukarya, as well as those unique to their respective kingdoms. The addition of "Ca. Lokiarchaeum" into the Venn groups created from an initial genomic census only added 10 FSFs to Archaea. The addition of "Ca. Lokiarchaeum" also only contributed to a decrease of two FSFs previously unique to Eukarya. There were still 284 FSFs found exclusively in Eukarya. Promethearchaeaceae’s limited impact in changing the Venn distribution of FSFs demonstrates the lack of genes that could be traced to a common ancestor with Eukaryotes. Rather, Eukaryotic genes present in bacterial and archaeal organisms are hypothesized to be from horizontal transfer from an early ancestor of modern eukaryotes. This putative ancestor possessed crucial "starter" genes that enabled increased cellular complexity. This common ancestor, or a relative, eventually led to the evolution of eukaryotes.

In 2020, a Japanese research group reported culturing a strain of Promethearchaeaceae in the laboratory. This strain, currently named Promethearchaeum syntrophicum strain MK-D1, was observed in syntrophic association with two hydrogen-consuming microbes: a sulfate-reducing bacteria of the genus Halodesulfovibrio and a methanogen of the genus Methanogenium. The MK-D1 organism produces hydrogen as a metabolic byproduct, which is then consumed by the symbiotic syntrophs. MK-D1 also seems to organize its external membrane into complex structures using genes shared with eukaryotes. While association with alphaproteobacteria (from which mitochondria are thought to descend) was not observed, these features suggest that MK-D1 and its syntrophs may represent an extant example of archaea-bacteria symbiosis similar to that which gave rise to eukaryotes. In 2024, the research group published their description of the cultured strain, proposing the name Promethearchaeum syntrophicum (the genus of which differs from the earlier candidate name by dropping the second "o").

In 2022, the second cultured example of Promethearchaeaceae was reported and the strain was named "Ca. Lokiarchaeum ossiferum".

== Physiological traits ==
Promethearchaeaceae is known to have a tetrahydromethanopterin-dependent Wood–Ljungdahl pathway. This pathway contains a series of biochemical reactions aiding in inorganic carbon utilization. In Promethearchaeaceae, the WLP is thought to be acetogenic, due to lacking the gene methyl-CoM reductase necessary for methanogenesis.

Analysis of "Ca. Lokiarchaeum" genes also showed the expression of protein-encoding open reading frames (ORFs) involving the metabolism of sugars and proteins. However, these metabolic activities vary between subgroups of Promethearchaeaceae. While Promethearchaeaceae subgroups have similar genetic information, differences in metabolic abilities explain their respective ecological niches.

Two major subgroups of the Promethearchaeaceae family are Loki-2 and Loki-3. Incubations of these two subgroups from Helgoland mud sediments were analyzed through RNA and DNA stable isotope probing to understand their respective carbon metabolisms. Loki-3 were found to be active in both organic carbon utilization and the degradation of aromatic compounds. The Loki-3 subgroup was not found to utilize proteins or short chain fatty acids, even though genes for amino acid degradation were present in both subgroups. Loki-2 was found to utilize protein, as seen through activity in when proteins were provided in Loki-2 incubations. Due to the greater carbon utilization pathways of Loki-3, the subgroup is found in a more diverse range of marine sediments than Loki-2.

== See also ==
- List of Archaea genera
