= Abyssivirga =

Scientific classification
- Domain: Bacteria
- Kingdom: Bacillati
- Phylum: Bacillota
- Class: Clostridia
- Order: Eubacteriales
- Family: Vallitaleaceae
- Genus: Abyssivirga; Schouw et al. 2016
- Species: A. alkaniphila

Binomial name
- Abyssivirga alkaniphila Schouw et al. 2016

Type strain
- DSM 29592, JCM 30920, L81

Synonyms
- Alkanivorax lokii

Genus of bacteria

Abyssivirga is a bacterial genus from the family Vallitaleaceae with one known species, Abyssivirga alkaniphila.

Abyssivirga alkaniphila is a Gram-positive, rod-shaped, strictly anaerobic, mesophilic, syntrophic, alkane-degrading and motile bacterium which has been isolated from biofilm from a black smoker chimney from the Loki's Castle vent field near Norway.
