= Harpocratesius =

Scientific classification (Candidatus)
- Domain: Archaea
- Kingdom: Promethearchaeati
- Phylum: Promethearchaeota
- Class: Promethearchaeia
- Order: Promethearchaeales
- Family: Promethearchaeaceae
- Genus: Ca. Harpocratesius
- Species: Ca. H. repetitus

Binomial name
- Candidatus Harpocratesius repetitus Wu et al., 2022

Candidate genus of archaea

Candidatus Harpocratesius is a genus of Asgard archaea part of the taxonomic family Promethearchaeaceae. The only species is Ca. H. repetitus.

Phylogeny based on Nobs et al. (2026):

- Promethearchaeia
  - "Helarchaeales"
  - - Promethearchaeales
      - "Sigyniarchaeaceae"
      - - Promethearchaeaceae
          - "Ca. Nerearchaeum" Nobs et al., 2026
          - - "Ca. Harpocratesius" Wu et al., 2022
            - - "Ca. Lokiarchaeum" Spang et al., 2015
              - Promethearchaeum Imachi et al., 2024
