= Jan Mayen hotspot =

Coordinates: 71°0′35″N 8°35′29″W

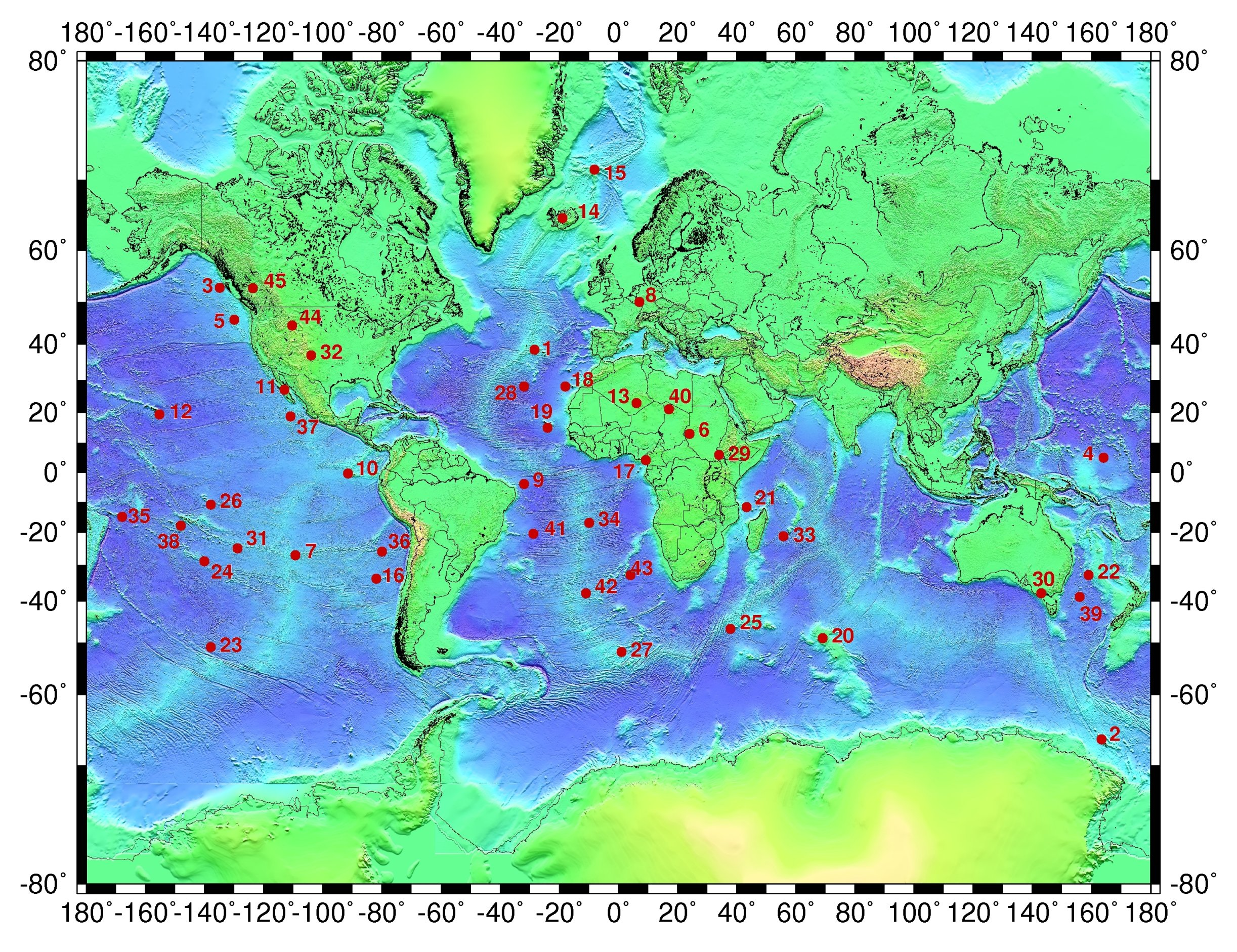
The Jan Mayen hotspot is marked 15 on the map.

The Jan Mayen hotspot is a postulated volcanic feature responsible for the volcanic activity that has formed the island of Jan Mayen in the northern Atlantic Ocean, but does not have all the characteristics to meet the standard definition of a volcanic hotspot.

== See also ==
- Geology of Jan Mayen
- Beerenberg volcano
