= Bockfjorden =

Fjord in Svalbard, Norway

Coordinates: 79.4690°N 13.3287°E

Bockfjorden is a fjord in Haakon VII Land at Spitsbergen, Svalbard, at the western side of Woodfjorden. Bockfjorden is named after Arctic explorer Franz-Karl von Bock. At the western side of the fjord is the inactive volcano Sverrefjellet.
