= Jan Mayen Microcontinent =

Atlantic fragment of continental crust

Coordinates: 69.6°N 8.2°W

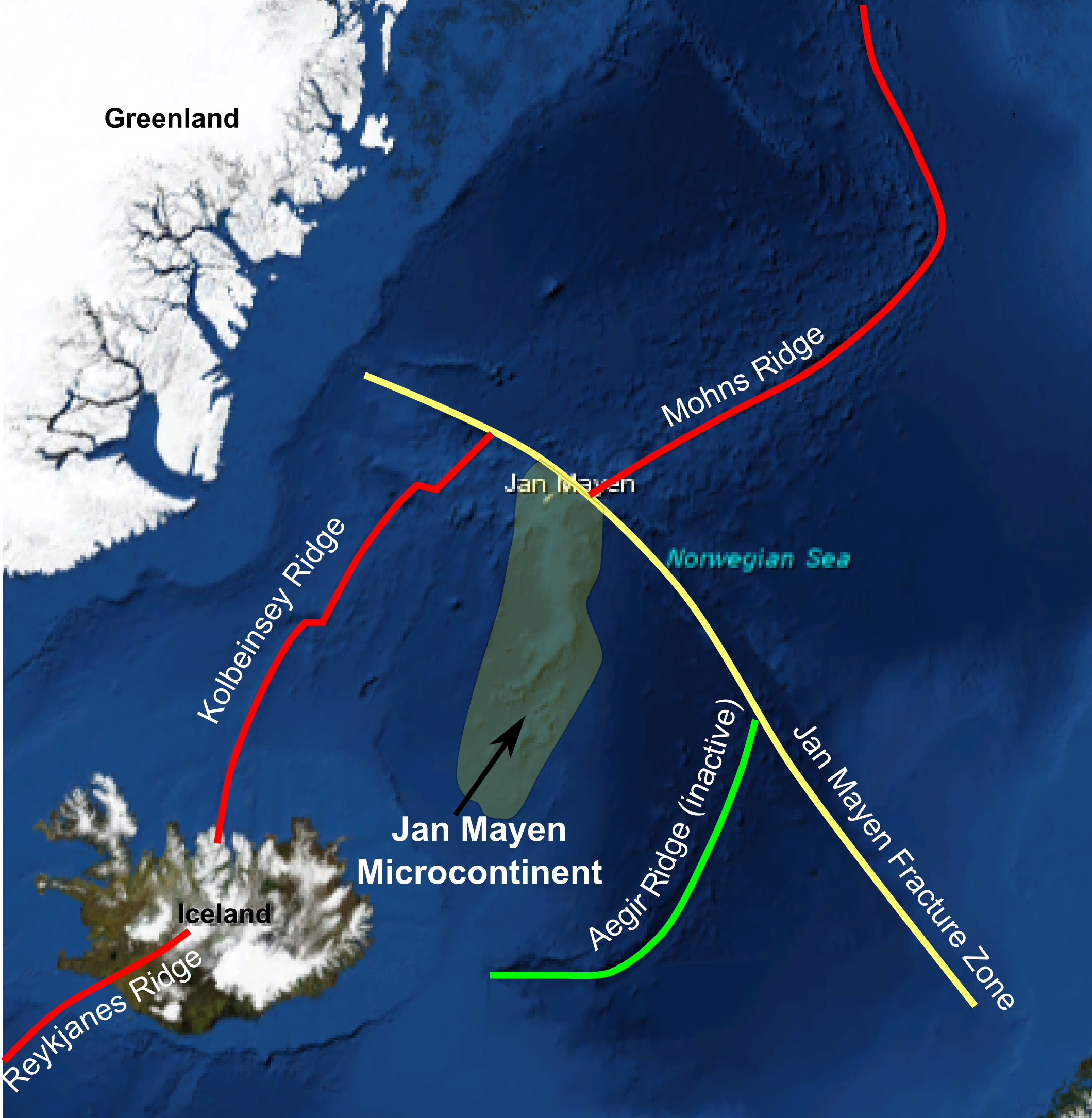
Location of the Jan Mayen Microcontinent between the active Kolbeinsey Ridge, the inactive Aegir Ridge and the Jan Mayen Fracture zone

The Jan Mayen Microcontinent is a fragment of continental crust within the oceanic part of the western Eurasian Plate lying northeast of Iceland. At the onset of separation between the Greenland and Eurasian plates 55 million years ago, it formed part of the eastern margin of the Greenland Plate. Propagation of a new spreading center from the Reykjanes Ridge separated this microcontinent from the Greenland Plate. For a short period it formed a microplate, until the Aegir Ridge became inactive, after which it formed part of the Eurasian Plate. The island of Jan Mayen is a much younger feature, formed of volcanic rock, built up at the northernmost tip of the microcontinent.

== Extent ==
The microcontinent extends about 500 km (310 mi) southwards from the Jan Mayen fracture zone. It is up to 160 km (99 mi) wide. The Jan Mayen Ridge separates the Norwegian Sea (the Norway Basin) from the Greenland Sea.

== Identification ==
The microcontinent was identified originally on the basis of being a bathymetric high, a positive free-air gravity anomaly and due to the lack of magnetic anomalies, all indicating that it consisted of continental crust. This interpretation has been confirmed using wide-angle seismic reflection and refraction data, coupled with standard normal incidence seismic reflection data.

== Make-up ==
The microcontinent consists of the prominent bathymetric high, the Jan Mayen Ridge and several subsidiary ridges and intervening basins towards the south and west. Investigations using seismic reflection and refraction data have identified two passive margin sequences on the two sides of the microcontinent. Faults mapped on seismic reflection data are roughly N-S trending in the northern part becoming SW-NE trending to the south. The crustal thickness reaches a maximum of 16 km (9.9 mi) on the eastern side of the main ridge.

== History ==
At the time of the initial break-up along the North Atlantic margin (Aegir Ridge in this area), the Jan Mayen Microcontinent formed part of the passive margin developed along the East Greenland margin.

Towards the end of the Eocene period, at about the time marked by chron 17 (Middle to Late Eocene) a new spreading centre began to propagate northeastwards from the Reykjanes Ridge, forming the Kolbeinsey Ridge. During the period when both the Kolbeinsey and Aegir ridges were active, the microcontinent underwent a 30°–50° anti-clockwise rotation. This was caused by the northeastward propagation of the Kolbeinsey Ridge, with simultaneous reduction in the rate of spreading at the southwestern end of the Aegir Ridge. An alternative but challenged model involves no rotation but the development of several short-lived fracture zones cutting through the microcontinent. With both ridges active the microcontinent was also temporarily a microplate.

The Kolbeinsey Ridge reached the Jan Mayen Fracture Zone and therefore linked up to the Mohns Ridge, at about chron 6 (Late Oligocene to Early Miocene). At this time activity on the Aegir Ridge died away and the microcontinent became part of the Eurasian Plate. The northern end of the microcontinent was affected by renewed displacement on the Jan Mayen Fracture Zone. The volcanic island of Jan Mayen only formed in the Pleistocene, possibly related to a hotspot, known as the Jan Mayen hotspot, at the triple junction at the end of the Mohns Ridge.

== Economic resources ==
The area around the microcontinent has recently become open for licensing for hydrocarbon exploration. Licenses in the southern part, known as the northern Dreki area, have been offered by the National Energy Authority for the Icelandic government and the northern area is being assessed for future petroleum activity by the Norwegian Petroleum Directorate.
