= Weyprecht Glacier =

Glacier on Jan Mayen, Norway

- Weyprechtbreen
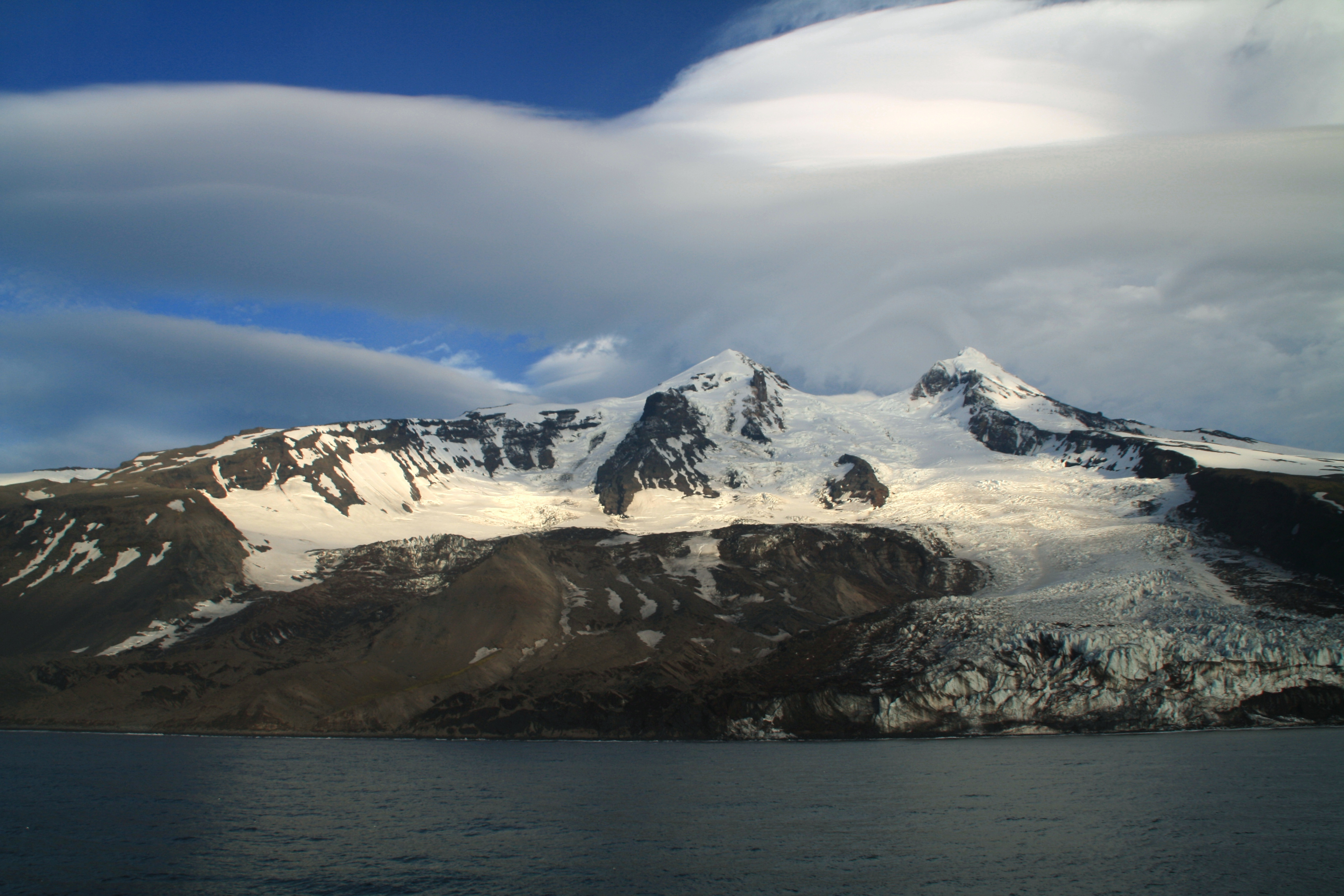
- The Weyprecht Glacier in the Beerenberg

- Location within North Atlantic
- Type: Piedmont glacier
- Location: Jan Mayen
- Coordinates: 71°06′52″N 8°11′13″W
- Area: 8.9 km^{2} (3.4 sq mi)
- Length: 6.8 km (4.2 mi)
- Terminus: North Atlantic Ocean

Weyprecht Glacier (Norwegian: Weyprechtbreen) is a glacier in Jan Mayen. It is the longest glacier located in the Beerenberg area.

The glacier is named after Austro-Hungarian Arctic explorer Karl Weyprecht.

== See also ==
- List of glaciers in Norway
- Svalbard and Jan Mayen
