= Nerearchaeum marumarumayae =

- 3D segmentation analysis of a cryo-electron tomography (cryo-ET) showing a cell of Ca. N. marismarmayae. Inner membrane: blue, the outer layer: turquoise, putative ribosomes: gray; arrows: extracellular fibers: light orange, intracellular filaments: light green. Scale bar: 100 nm.

Scientific classification (Candidatus)
- Domain: Archaea
- Kingdom: Promethearchaeati
- Phylum: Promethearchaeota
- Class: Promethearchaeia
- Order: Promethearchaeales
- Family: Promethearchaeaceae
- Genus: "Ca. Nerearchaeum" Nobs et al., 2026
- Species: "Ca. N. marumarumayae"

Binomial name
- "Candidatus Nerearchaeum marumarumayae" Nobs et al., 2026

Species of archaeon

Species-level cladogram of all named species within the order Promethearchaeales (topology based on Nobs et al.,2026).

Proposed syntrophic interactions between Ca. Nerearchaeum marumarumayae and Stromatodesulfovibrio nilemahensis based on genome sequence prediction.

Candidatus Nerearchaeum marumarumayae is a species of non-eukaryotic archaeon described in 2026, and a member of the taxonomic family Promethearchaeaceae. The species has a symbiotic relationship with another microorganism, the bacterium Stromatodesulfovibrio nilemahensis.

Phylogeny based on Nobs et al. (2026):

- Promethearchaeia
  - "Helarchaeales"
  - - Promethearchaeales
      - "Sigyniarchaeaceae"
      - - Promethearchaeaceae
          - "Ca. Nerearchaeum" Nobs et al., 2026
          - - "Ca. Harpocratesius" Wu et al., 2022
            - - "Ca. Lokiarchaeum" Spang et al., 2015
              - Promethearchaeum Imachi et al., 2024
