= Beerenberg =

Volcano on Jan Mayen island

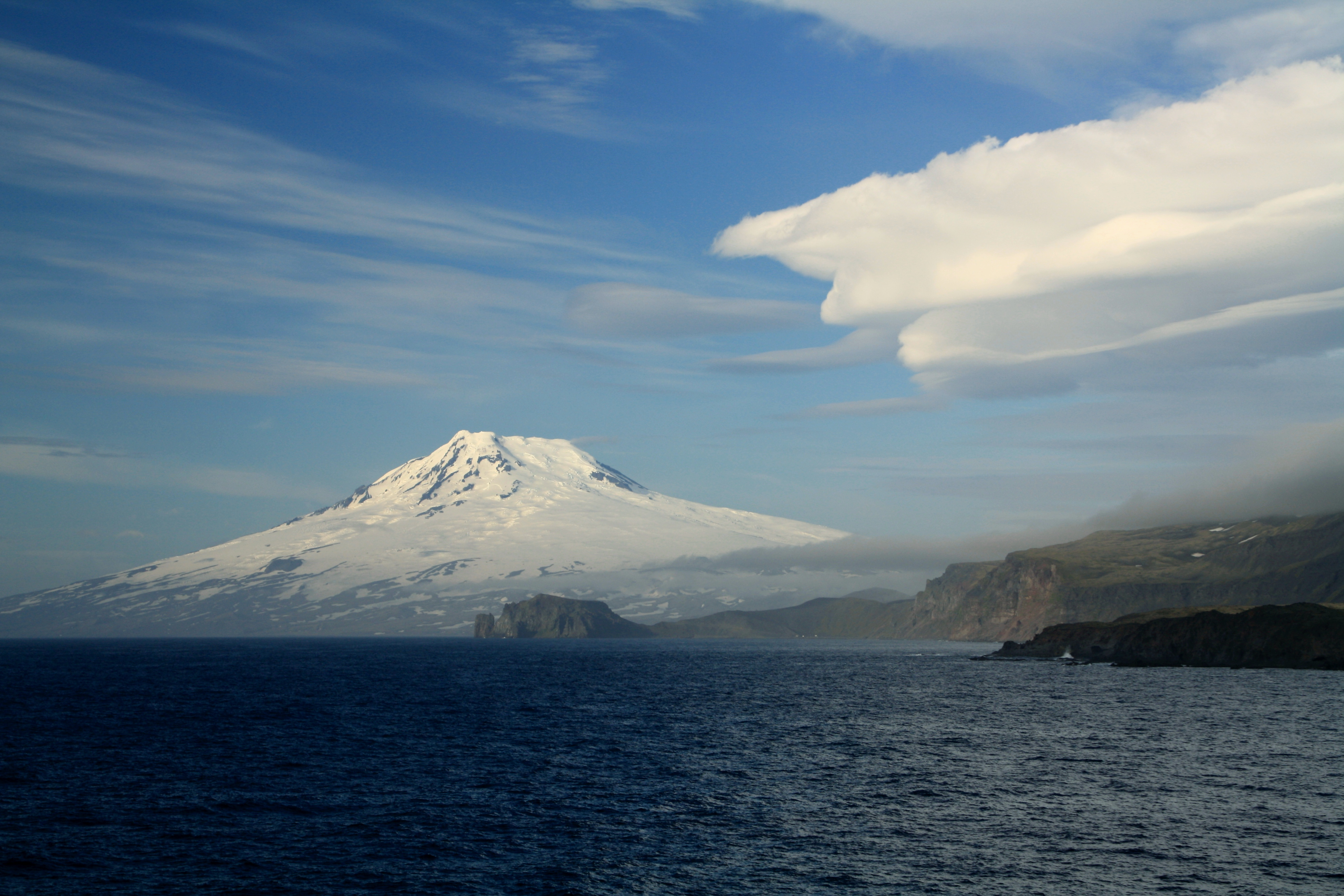
- Beerenberg, July 2011

Highest point
- Elevation: 2,277 m (7,470 ft)
- Prominence: 2,277 m (7,470 ft)
- Isolation: 596.44 km (370.61 mi)
- Listing: Ultra
- Coordinates: 71°4′36″N 8°9′52″W

Naming
- Language of name: Dutch

Geography
- Location within North Atlantic
- Jan Mayen island with Beerenberg crater (red outline) and named peaks (gray) and inactive vent (brown) – click for interactive zoom
- Location: Jan Mayen, Norway

Geology
- Mountain type: Stratovolcano
- Last eruption: January 1985

Climbing
- First ascent: 1921 Wordie, Mercanton and Lethbridge

Beerenberg is a stratovolcano dominating the northeastern end of the Norwegian island of Jan Mayen. It is 2,277 m (7,470 ft) high and is the world's northernmost subaerial active volcano and the only active volcano in Norway. The volcano is topped by a mostly ice-filled crater about 1 kilometre (0.62 miles) wide, with numerous peaks along its rim, including the highest summit, Haakon VII Toppen, on its western side.

== Name ==
Its name is Dutch for "Bear Mountain" and comes from the polar bears seen there by Dutch whalers in the early 17th century.

== Description ==
The upper slopes of the volcano are largely ice-covered, with several major glaciers, including five which reach the sea. The longest of the glaciers is the Weyprecht Glacier, which flows from the summit crater via a breach through the northwestern portion of the crater rim, and extends about 6 km (4 mi) down to the sea.

== Geology ==
Jan Mayen island is a younger surface feature of a 400-kilometre-long (250-mile) undersea ridge from the Jan Mayen Microcontinent that rifted off the east Greenland continental margin about 36 million years ago during the Paleocene/Eocene transition. The volcanic island of Jan Mayen formed in the Pleistocene, and is without all the characteristics of a volcanic hotspot, although the Jan Mayen hotspot has been postulated.

Beerenberg itself is composed primarily of alkali basaltic lava flows with minor amounts of tephra. Numerous cinder cones have been formed along slope fissures.

=== Eruptions ===
Its most recent eruptions took place in 1970 and 1985, both of which were flank eruptions from fissures on the northeast side of the mountain. Other eruptions with historical records occurred in 1732, 1818, and 1851.

Summary of confirmed well dated recent eruptions
Start Date	End Date	VEI	Comment
6 January 1985	9 January 1985	2	Eruption from fissures on the northern slope.
15 January 1973	-	1	Only timed within ± 45 days
2 July 1970	18 September 1970	3	The eruption end is uncertain ± 182 days
2 July 1851	-	-	Eruption period is only dated within ± 30 years but definitely erupting on date given
16 April 1818	-	3	Eruption period is only dated within ± 15 days but definitely erupting on date given; VEI size has uncertainty
17 May 1732	18 May 1732	4	
1558	-	-	Eruption was in 1558 or before
1350	-	-	Radiocarbon dating ± 300 years

=== Risks ===
The main risk is disruption to aviation from a large eruption. There are funded proposals to increase the relevant monitoring capacity.

== History ==
There was an Austrian attempt to reach the summit of Beerenberg, presumably whilst the Austrians had a weather station on the island in 1882–83, but the attempt failed due to poor weather. The first recorded ascent was in the summer of 1921, by an expedition led by Dr. Paul Louis Mercanton, joined by James Wordie, T.C. Lethbridge, and three others. The British expedition was taken to the island by the Norwegian meteorological service, which was establishing a wireless station on the island.

== See also ==
- List of volcanoes in Norway
- List of mountains in Norway by prominence
