= Sverrefjellet =

Mountain in Haakon VII Land at Spitsbergen, Svalbard

Coordinates: 79.431656°N 13.304977°E

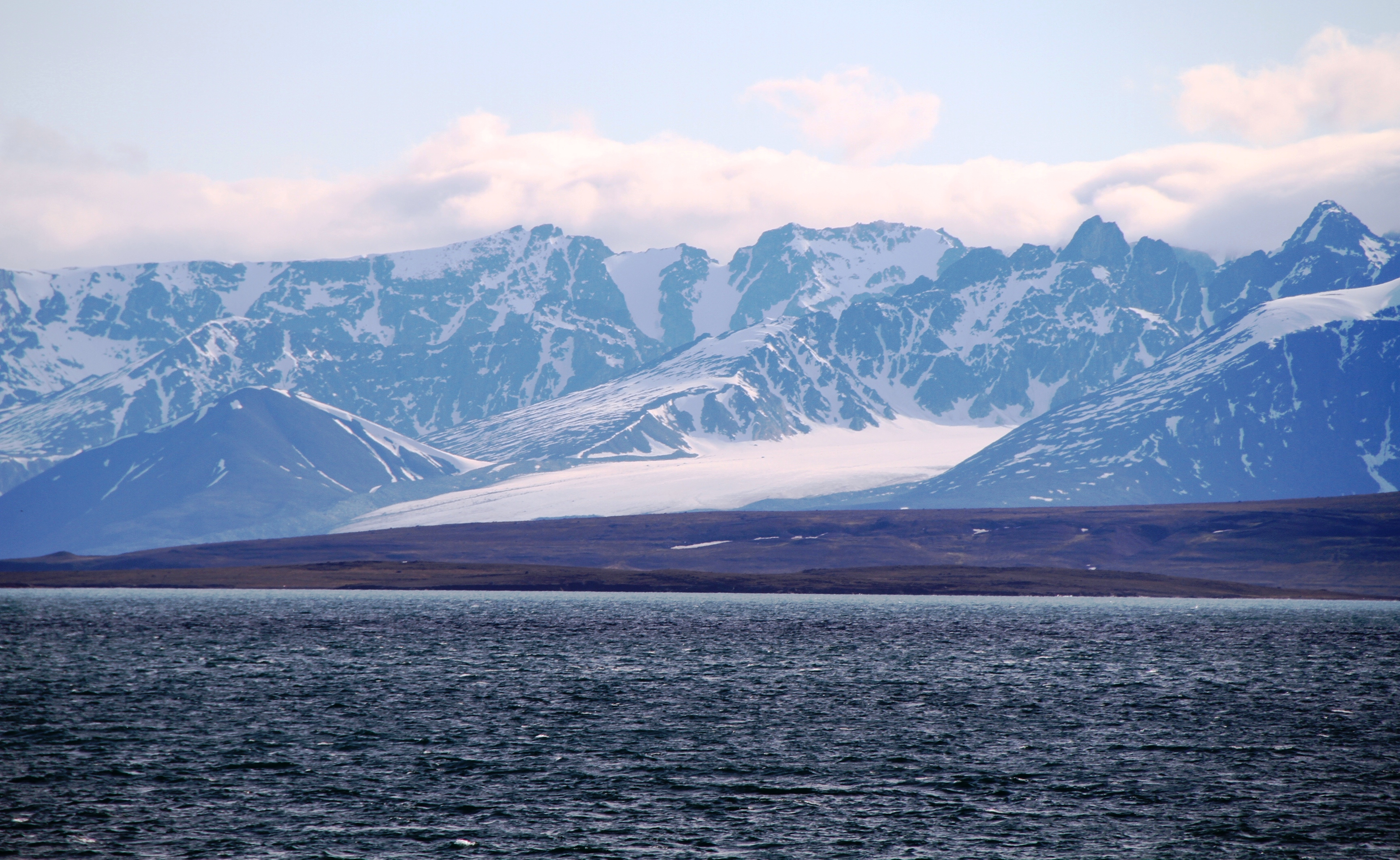
View of Sverrefjellet among other mountain tops

Sverrefjellet is a mountain in Haakon VII Land at Spitsbergen, Svalbard, at the western side of Bockfjorden. It has a height of 507 m.a.s.l., and is an extinct volcano. Sverrefjellet is named after Sverre Sigurdsson.

The Sverrefjellet volcano is a fascinating natural formation that has been studied only recently to understand its age and eruption history. Due to its uniqueness, the Sverrefjellet volcano is also being used by researchers as a simulation of Mars's surface to understand how water and therefore life would interact with the cold dry climate.

The Sverrefjellet volcano was created during the Pleistocene-age, which was about 2.6 million years ago. The currently accepted range for the last time it erupted is between 6000 years and 1 million years ago. This was found using radiogenic argon gas, a form of radiometric dating that measures the rate of radioactive decay of potassium to argon.

The Sverrefjellet volcano is positioned with the Jotun springs to its north and the Troll springs to its south. They are both thermal springs that are created by a major fault line and can get up to 25.6 °C. The Sverrefjellet volcano exists along the Breibogen - Bockfjorden fault system. On the East side of Sverrefjellet are glacial streams and wave cut platforms. These streams run into the valley called Vulkanbekken, which empties into the Bockfjorden fjord. On the north side lies the Adolfbreen glacier. Lastly, on the south side, there is a slope until just north of the Nygaardbreen glacier.

Pollen spores were used to understand how specifically the base of the Sverrefjellet volcano evolved over time, this is difficult to do because the Sverrefjellet volcano ash around the profile there are no other objects that can be used for radiocarbon dating. The pollen was identified to come mostly from the following plants surrounding the Sverrefjellet volcano; willow (Salix), sedges (Cyperaceae), and common cottongrass (Eriophorum scheuchzeri). The lifetime of the Sverrefjellet volcano can be broken down into 4 phases that are reflected in the amount of growth in the glaciers. Phase 1 had a higher percentage of willow pollen found, indicating that there was more snowfall. Phase 2 was a period of warming, which caused the glaciers to begin to melt. Phase 3 saw climatic cooling through the higher presence of sedges found. Lastly, Phase 4 saw the willow pollen increase along with pollen that was not identified to be found locally and was therefore brought by fishermen in the 16th or 17th century, implying that this stage was one of warming. In the younger layers of the mountain, eggs from the phylum Tardigrada were found. Tardigrada are commonly called "water bears" because they are microscopic organisms that are found in water but are able to survive extreme environments and resemble bears.

The center of the Sverrefjellet volcano is on the same fault line as the springs. The fault line lead to the right chemicals and temperature conditions to exist in the Sverrefjellet volcano for it to produce the mineral Olivine. Olivine is an important mineral that has been studied as an indicator for liquid water on Mars due to its unique characteristics. The conditions experienced by the Sverrefjellet volcano are similar to those experienced by the surface of Mars, providing an experimental setup that scientists can analyze to predict the evolution of Mars' environment. This parallel is due to the fact that they both undergo weathering not only through a freezing and thawing process but also through wetting and drying the surface. Because Olivine has been found on both Mars and at the Sverrefjellet volcano, therefore it has been used to develop and test equipment for detecting Olivine. At both locations, the rocks are basalts that have similar compositions of minerals and volcanic rocks. Another similarity between Mars and Sverrefjellet is that they don't have much contact with water, as evident by the rock layer of Olivine. Finding liquid water is incredibly important for finding evidence of life on other planets. Sverrefjellet has been found to have allophane, a unique crystal, in the volcanic soil, providing evidence that allophane may also be found on Mars, due to the similarity in the conditions experienced.
