= Aegir Ridge =

Extinct mid-ocean ridge in the far-northern Atlantic Ocean

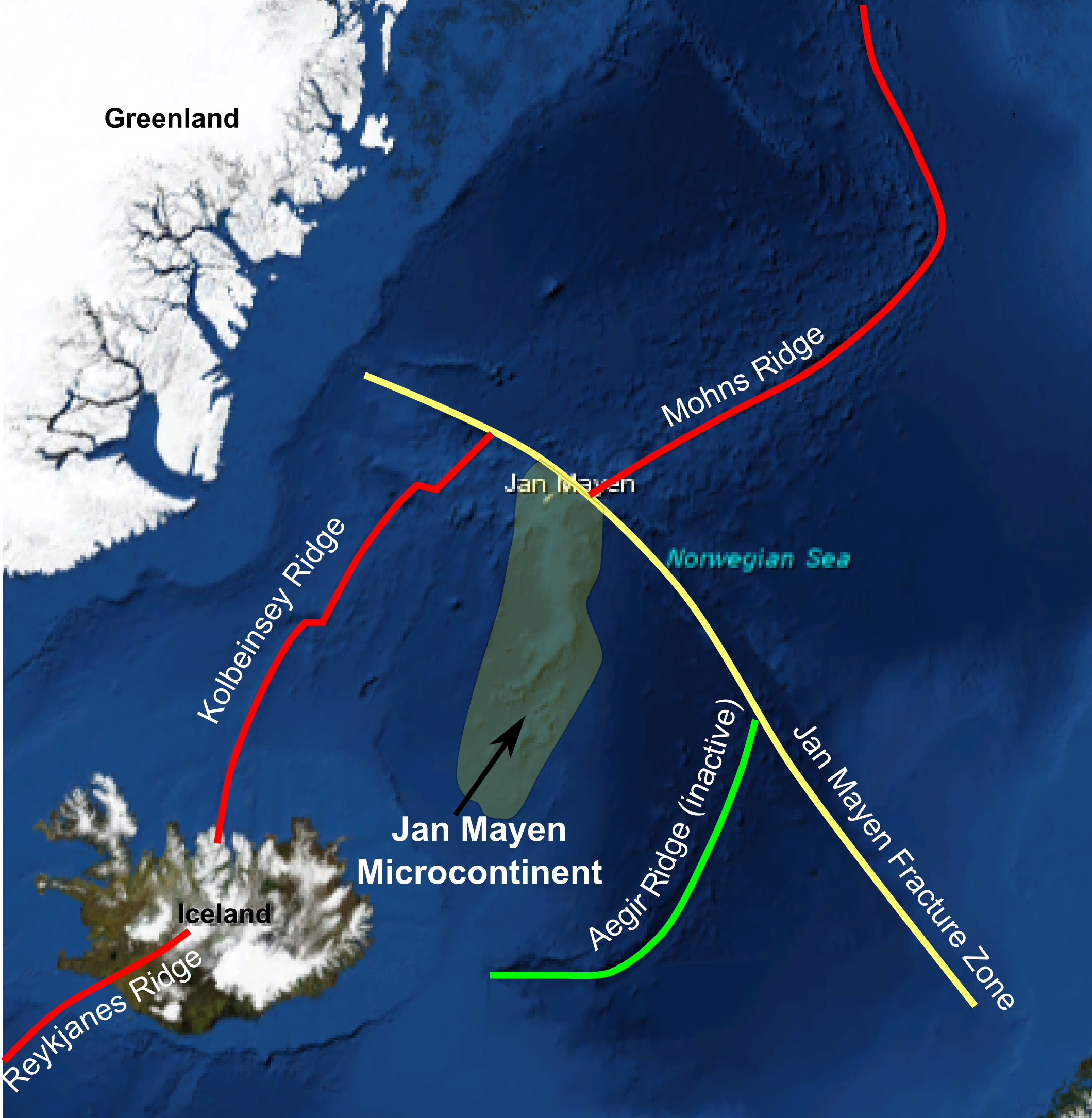
Map showing the location of the Aegir Ridge and other major geological features of the northernmost Atlantic

The Aegir Ridge is an extinct segment of the Mid-Atlantic Ridge in the far-northern Atlantic Ocean. It marks the initial break-up boundary between Greenland and Norway, along which seafloor spreading was initiated at the beginning of the Eocene epoch to form the northern Atlantic Ocean. Towards the end of the Eocene, the newly forming Kolbeinsey Ridge propagated northwards from Iceland, splitting the Jan Mayen Microcontinent away from the Greenland plate. As the Kolbeinsey Ridge formed, so activity on the Aegir Ridge reduced, ceasing completely at the end of the Oligocene epoch when the Kolbeinsey Ridge reached the Jan Mayen fracture zone.

The relatively thin crust and short lifespan of the Aegir Ridge is anomalous given its proximity to the Iceland hotspot. Mantle hotspots deliver warm, actively-upwelling material to mid-ocean ridges, increasing mantle melting and crustal production. Likely, the stresses associated with plate tectonics and the mechanical structure of the lithosphere created a situation in which spreading at the Kolbeinsey Ridge was energetically favorable to spreading at the Aegir Ridge. As the Kolbeinsey Ridge began rifting, hotspot material would then draw out of the Aegir Ridge and flow preferentially towards the Kolbeinsey Ridge, leading to the ultimate extinction of the spreading center.

== See also ==
- Kula-Farallon Ridge
