= Lokiarchaeum =

"Candidatus Lokiarchaeum"

Scientific classification (Candidatus)
- Domain: Archaea
- Kingdom: Promethearchaeati
- Phylum: Promethearchaeota
- Class: Promethearchaeia
- Order: Promethearchaeales
- Family: Promethearchaeaceae
- Genus: "Ca. Lokiarchaeum" corrig. Spang et al. 2015

Type species
- "Ca. Lokiarchaeum primum" Spang et al. 2015

Other species
- "Ca. Lokiarchaeum ossiferum" Rodrigues-Oliveira et al. 2023

Synonyms
- "Ca. Lokiarchaeon" Sousa et al. 2016

Genus of archaea

"Candidatus Lokiarchaeum" is the first discovered genus of Promethearchaeati, the kingdom from which eukaryotes emerged. It belongs to the family Promethearchaeaceae and contains the species "Ca. Lokiarchaeum primum" and "Ca. Lokiarchaeum ossiferum".

== Taxonomy ==
Species-level cladogram of all named species within the order Promethearchaeales (topology based on Nobs et al.,2026).

"Ca. Lokiarchaeum" was described in 2015 and was assigned to the phylum "Lokiarchaeota". In 2017, "Lokiarchaeota" was assigned to the superphylum "Asgard", as well as other phyla. Later, the superphylum "Asgard" was de-ranked to the phylum "Asgardarchaeota". In 2023, the species "Ca. Lokiarchaeum ossiferum" was described. In 2024, "Asgardarchaeota" was renamed to Promethearchaeota. In 2025, the unclassified species GC14_75 was pro-validly published as a type species "Ca. Lokiarchaeum primum" in Candidatus List No. 7, with the authority "Spang et al. 2015".

== See also ==
List of Archaea genera
