= Mohns Ridge =

Geographical region in the Atlantic basin

Coordinates: 71.91375225°N 1.20254893°W

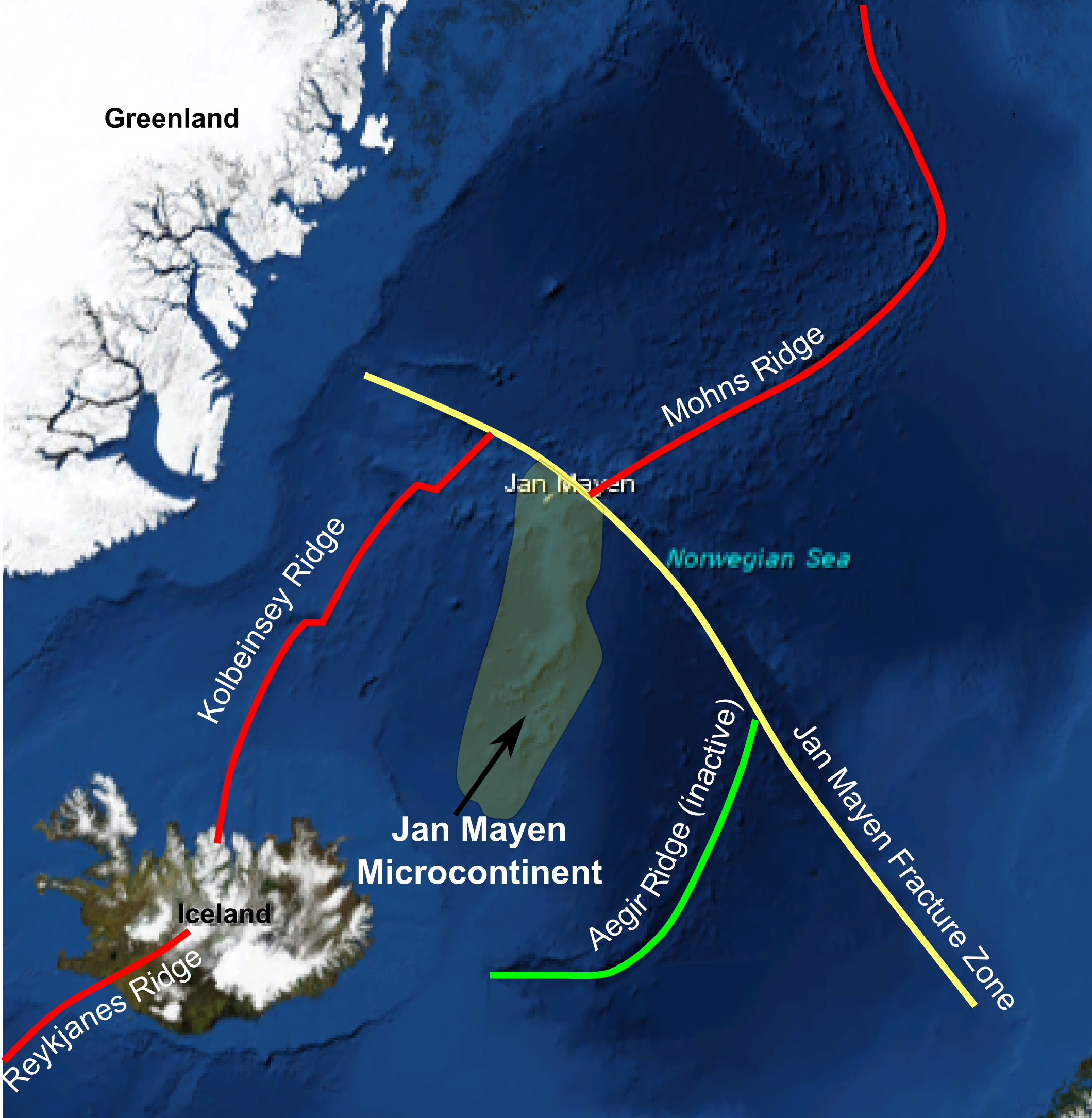
Map showing the location of the Mohns Ridge and other major geological features of the northernmost Atlantic

The Mohns Ridge is an ultraslow-spreading segment of the Mid-Atlantic Ridge located to the north of Jan Mayen in the Arctic Ocean. It is bounded to the south by the Jan Mayen fracture zone, and transitions to Knipovich Ridge in the north-east.

== Geology ==
The ridge started forming 53 My ago, as the Greenland Plate and Eurasian Plate started separating. Four separate axial volcanic ridges have been discovered along Mohns Ridge.

== Notable features ==
Several active and non-active hydrothermal vent fields have been located along Mohns Ridge. In 2008, a black smoker vent field named Loki's Castle was discovered along one of the axial volcanic ridges in the area.

The Schulz Bank seamount is located on the northern part of the ridge, as Mohns Ridge transitions into the Knipovich Ridge.
