= Loki's Castle =

Active vents in the Atlantic Ocean

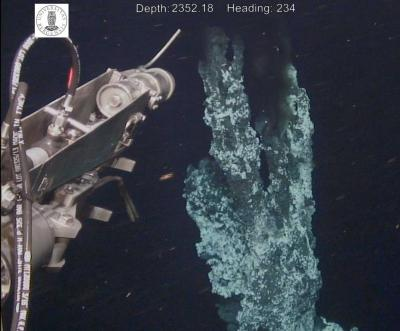
- The top three feet of a 40-foot (12-meter)-tall vent chimney at Loki's Castle, mid-July 2008

- Location within Earth
- Location: Mid-Atlantic Ridge
- Coordinates: 73°33′00″N 08°09′00″E
- Min. elevation: −2,352 metres (−7,717 ft)

Loki's Castle is a field of five active hydrothermal vents in the mid-Atlantic Ocean, located at 73 degrees north on the Mid-Atlantic Ridge between Iceland and Svalbard at a depth of 2,352 metres (7,717 ft). When they were discovered in mid-July 2008, they were the most northerly black smoker vents known to science.

They are of geological interest as they occur in a relatively stable region of the Earth's crust with diminished tectonic forces and consequently fewer hydrothermal vents. They are the site where a biologically distinct class of archaea, the Lokiarchaeota, were discovered.

== Geography ==
Loki's Castle is located on the Gakkel Ridge (previously the Arctic Mid-Ocean Ridge), where the Mohns and Knipovich ridges converge. Ocean core complexes are found to the northwest. The field resides approximately 2,300 metres (7,500 ft) deep at the boundary of the Greenland and Norwegian Sea.

== History ==
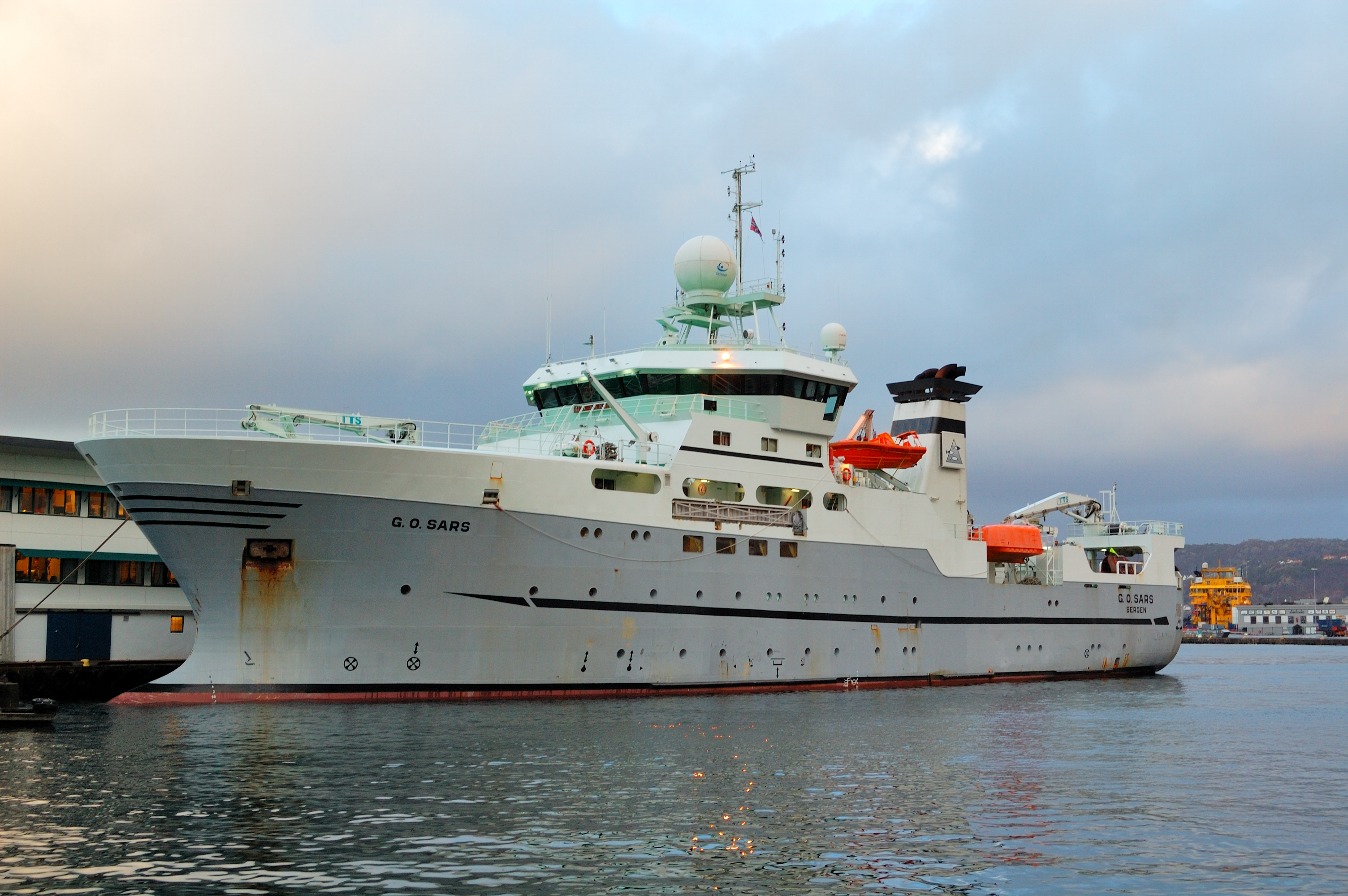
Norwegian research vessel the G.O. Sars in Bergen, Norway.

=== Discovery ===
The vents were discovered in 2008 by a 25-person multinational scientific expedition of the University of Bergen, Norway. The vents are located more than 120 nautical miles (220 km) north of what were previously the northernmost known vents, discovered in 2005. The high-latitude 2005 and 2008 expeditions were both led by geologist Rolf Pedersen of the university's Centre for Geobiology, aboard the research vessel G.O. Sars (named after the Norwegian marine biologist Georg Ossian Sars and launched in May 2003). The vents were located using a remotely controlled underwater vehicle.

The vent field was given the name Loki's Castle as its shape reminded its discoverers of a fantasy castle. The reference is to the ancient Norse god of trickery, Loki. It was felt to be "an appropriate name for a field that was so difficult to locate".

=== Recent expeditions ===
Loki's Castle continued to be sampled by CTDs and Niskin rosettes following the discovery in 2008.

2 metres (6.6 ft) gravity cores were collected from the vent field in 2010.

The field was revisited by the G.O. Sars in 2018 and 2019 by the United States Geological Survey and the University of Bergen to take sediment push cores. For 11 months, a ocean bottom seismometer was placed at Loki's Castle from August 2019 to July 2020, revealing an emerging detachment fault to the west of the field and approximately 7.5 low-magnitude seismic events per day.

== Geology ==
Loki's Castle is described in literature as a sediment-influenced basalt-hosted hydrothermal field. Due to boron isotopic composition of hydrothermal fluids, it is suggested that vent fluid is recharged (or percolates into the seafloor) in regions densely concentrated with oceanic sediments, rather than unsedimented igneous rock of ridge flanks.

21 types of minerals have been identified at the vent field. When cores were collected in 2018 and 2019, talc was found in samples.

Carbon-14 dating estimates the oldest hydrothermal material at the field to be over 9,100 years old.

=== Mounds and chimneys ===
The vent field is composed of two 20–30 metres (66–98 ft) sulfide mounds, each 150–200 metres (490–660 ft) across, and join into a single composite mound. The size is comparable to that of the TAG field on the Mid-Atlantic Ridge, one of the largest known hydrothermal fields as of 2010. A member of the 2008 expedition, oceanographer Marvin Lilley, has speculated that this may be the largest such deposit ever seen on the sea floor.

The five active chimneys of Loki's Castle are venting water as hot as 320 °C (608 °F) and sit on a vast mound of sulfide minerals that is about 251 metres (825 ft) in diameter at its base and some 90 m (300 ft) across its top. The active chimneys are mostly black in colour but are covered with mats of white bacteria that are living on minerals and materials emitted by the vents. The older chimneys are mottled red in colour due to the presence of deposits of oxidised iron.

Four distinct high-temperature chimneys were sampled between 2008 and 2009: João, Menorah, Camel, and Sleepy. The chimneys are predominantly sphalerite, pyrite, and pyrrhotite, and small amounts of chalcopyrite. Small barite chimneys (height of <1 metre (3 ft 3 in)) are located east of the main field, where venting is less pronounced. This section of the system is nicknamed the Barite Field.

=== Fluid chemistry ===
Loki's Castle fluids are rich in volatile gases, namely hydrogen sulfide, hydrogen, and methane. The field is also associated with high concentrations of hydrocarbons, ammonium, and alkalinity while being depleted of dissolved iron and manganese. Fluid pH from high-temperature locations are acidic, ranging from 5.5 - 6.1.

== Ecology ==
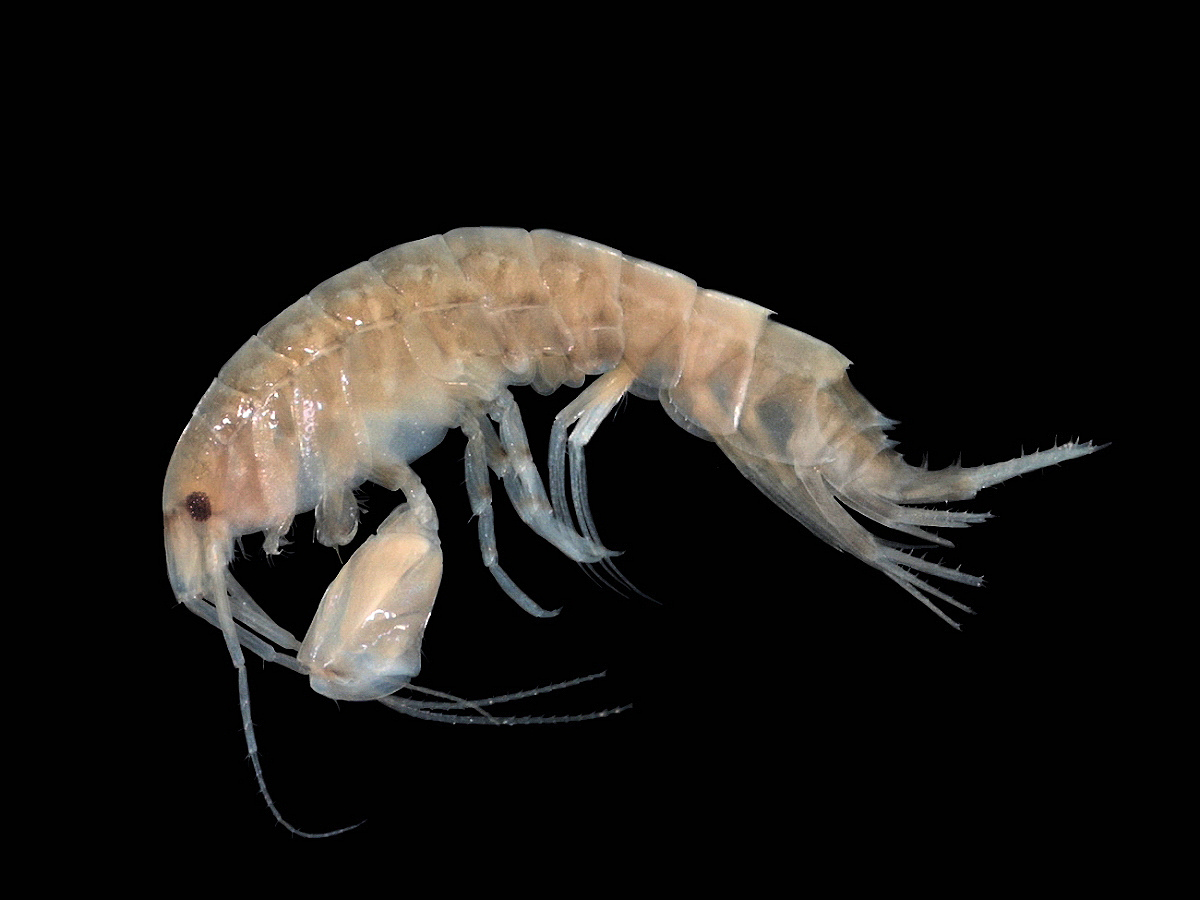
Melitidae amphipods, found around Loki's Castle

The bristleworm Nicomache lokii (Maldanidae) is thought to be a key species in the fauna surrounding the hydrothermal vents in the area. This species is one of the more than ten species that were newly discovered here.

Sclerolinum contortum tube worms are located at the field on the largest sulfide mounds. Melitidae amphipods are found amongst the tube worms and are common in chimney crevices.

=== Microbiology ===
Loki's Castle has dense mats of bacteria on and around vents that use the minerals and compounds expelled by the vents. Common among these are Epsilonproteobacteria and Gammaproteobacteria, which oxidize the abundant hydrogen and hydrogen sulfide and form biofilms on active chimney surfaces. Thaumarchaeota have been found at less active chimney sites. Sulfurovum dominate microbial mats. Samples from 2008 and 2010 contained a diversity of Chlamydiae.

Preliminary observations have indicated that the warm area around the vents of Loki's Castle is a marine ecotope populated with apparently unique and diverse microorganisms, unlike other observed marine hydrothermal vent ecosystems. One of these, an archaeal phylum named Lokiarchaeota, was discovered and named after Loki's Castle. Lokiarchaeota is renowned as a potential linkage between prokaryotes and eukaryotes in the three-domain system of life.

Metagenome analyses by Bäckström et al. in 2019 showed that there must be a whole series of previously unknown viruses that are known as LCVs or Loki's Castle Viruses. These are primarily giant viruses of the Megaviricetes class in the phylum Nucleocytoviricota (NCLDV) in the area of Loki's Castle. Of the 23 high-quality NCLDV genomic bins:

- 15 are related to pithoviruses,
- 5 are related to Marseille viruses,
- 1 are related to iridoviruses, and
- 2 are related to klosneuviruses

The iridovirus-like gene sequence has been named "LCIVAC01".

== See also ==
- Asgard (archaea)
- Lokiarchaeota
