= Haloarculaceae =

Scientific classification
- Domain: Archaea
- Kingdom: Methanobacteriati
- Phylum: Methanobacteriota
- Class: Halobacteria
- Order: Halobacteriales
- Family: Haloarculaceae; Gupta et al. 2016

Genera
- See text

Synonyms
- "Halomicrobiaceae" McGonigle et al. 2019

Family of archaea

Haloarculaceae is a family of halophilic and mostly chemoorganotrophic archaea within the order Halobacteriales. The type genus of this family is Haloarcula. Its biochemical characteristics are the same as the order Halobacteriales.

The name Haloarculaceae is derived from the Latin term Haloarcula, referring to the type genus of the family and the suffix "-ceae," an ending used to denote a family. Together, Haloarculaceae refers to a family whose nomenclatural type is the genus Haloarcula.

== Current taxonomy and molecular signatures ==
As of 2021, Haloarculaceae contains 10 validly published genera. This family can be molecularly distinguished from other Halobacteria by the presence of 19 conserved signature proteins (CSPs) and seven conserved signature indels (CSIs) present in the following proteins: acetylglutamate kinase, ribonuclease R, metallo-beta-lactamase, tRNA modifying enzyme, carbamoyl phosphate synthase large subunit and hypothetical proteins.

== Specific genera ==
=== Halocatena ===
Halocatena is a genus in this family. One of the species, Halocatena halophila (=Actinoarchaeum halophilum), is known for displaying "hyphae and spores" structure akin to the Actinomycetales. The operon responsible for such structural differentation appears to be homologous to the Streptomycetes one and can compensate for the deletion of the bacterial version.

== Phylogeny ==
The currently accepted taxonomy is based on the List of Prokaryotic names with Standing in Nomenclature (LPSN) and National Center for Biotechnology Information (NCBI).

16S rRNA based LTP_07_2026

- - - Halobacteriaceae *
      - - Halanaeroarchaeum
        - Halodesulfurarchaeum
      - - Salarchaeum
        - - - Halocalculus
            - Halospeciosus
          - - Halarchaeum
            - Halobacterium
    - "Natronomonadaceae" *
      - - Halomarina
        - Halocatena [incl. Actinarchaeum]
      - - Haloglomus
        - - Salinirubellus
          - - - Halorarius halobius
              - - Halorarius litoreus
                - Halosegnis [incl. Salella]
            - Natronomonas
  - - Haloarculaceae
      - - - Halosiccatus [incl. [Halomicrobium salinisoli]
          - - - Haloglomus litoreum
              - Halosimplex
            - - Halarchaeoglobus
              - - Halovenus *
                - Salinibaculum
        - Haloarcula
      - - Halosimplex 2
        - - - Halomicrobium zhouii
            - - Halomicrobium mukohataei
              - Haloarcula~1
          - - Halorientalis
            - - - Salinibaculum *
                - - Salinirussus
                  - Halovenus~1
              - - Halorhabdus
                - - Halococcoides
                  - Halapricum

53 marker proteins based GTDB 11-RS232

- - - Haladaptataceae
    - - Halobacteriaceae *
        - - Halanaeroarchaeum
          - Halodesulfurarchaeum
        - - - - Halospeciosus
              - Salarchaeum
            - - Halocalculus
              - Halarchaeum
          - Halobacterium
  - - - Natronoarchaeaceae
      - Natrialbaceae
    - - - Halococcaceae
        - - Haloarculaceae
            - - - Halocatena * Verma et al. 2020
                  [incl. Actinarchaeum corrig. Tang et al. 2024]
                - Halomarina * Inoue et al. 2011
              - - Natronomonas * Kamekura et al. 1997
                - - - Halorarius Sun et al. 2023
                    - Halosegnis Duran-Viseras et al. 2022 [incl.
                      Salella Deshmukh & Oren 2023]
                  - - Salinirubellus * Hou et al. 2018
                    - Haloglomus Duran-Viseras, Sanchez-Porro & Ventosa 2020
            - - Halorientalis Cui et al. 2011
              - - - Halococcoides Sorokin et al. 2019
                  - - Halapricum Song et al. 2014
                    - Halorhabdus Waino et al. 2000
                - - - - Salinirussus Cui et al. 2017
                      - - Salinibaculum * Han & Cui 2020
                        - Halovenus * Makhdoumi-Kakhki et al. 2012
                    - Halosimplex Vreeland et al. 2003
                  - - Halomicrobium Oren et al. 2002 [incl. Halosiccatus]
                    - Haloarcula Torreblanca et al. 1986 em. Ma et al. 2024 [incl. Halomicroarcula]
      - Haloferacaceae

Note: * polyphyletic Halobacteriaceae

== See also ==
- List of Archaea genera
