= List of Archaea genera =

This article lists the genera of the Archaea and also shows taxa of archaea that do not contain genera. The currently accepted taxonomy is based on the List of Prokaryotic names with Standing in Nomenclature (LPSN) and National Center for Biotechnology Information (NCBI) unless otherwise noted.

== Phylogeny ==
For the GTDB phylogeny, National Center for Biotechnology Information (NCBI) taxonomy was initially used to decorate the genome tree via tax2tree. The 16S rRNA-based Greengenes taxonomy is used to supplement the taxonomy particularly in regions of the tree with no cultured representatives. List of Prokaryotic names with Standing in Nomenclature (LPSN) is used as the primary taxonomic authority for establishing naming priorities. Taxonomic ranks are normalised using Phylorank and the taxonomy manually curated to remove polyphyletic groups.

Cladogram was taken from the GTDB release 11-RS232 (15th April 2026).

- Archaea
  - "Undinarchaeota"
  - - - - "Huberarchaeaota"
        - - "Aenigmarchaeota"
          - - "Terrarchaeota"
            - "Nanohalarchaeota"
      - Nanobdellota
    - - - - "Altarchaeota"
          - - "Iainarchaeota"
            - "Micrarchaeota"
      - - "Methanococcia" {AGJL01}
        - - - - "Methanopyria" {JAADCQ01}
              - "Hydrothermarchaeota"
            - - - "Hadarchaeota"
                - "Thermococcia" {"Methanobacteriota B"}
              - Methanobacteriota
          - - - Thermoplasmatota
              - Halobacteriota
            - - "Korarchaeota"
              - - Thermoproteota
                - - Promethearchaeati
                    Promethearchaeota

== Phylum Microcaldota ==
=== Class Microcaldia ===
==== Order Microcaldales ====
- Family Microcaldaceae Sakai et al. 2023
  - Microcaldus Sakai et al. 2023

== Phylum "Undinarchaeota" ==
Phylogeny of "Undinarchaeota"

- "Undinarchaeia"
  - "Undinarchaeales"
    - "Naiadarchaeaceae"
      "Ca. Naiadarchaeum"
    - "Undinarchaeaceae"
      "Ca. Undinarchaeum"

=== Class "Undinarchaeia" ===
==== Order "Undinarchaeales" ====
- Family "Naiadarchaeaceae" Dombrowski et al. 2020
  - "Candidatus Naiadarchaeum" Dombrowski et al. 2020
- Family "Undinarchaeaceae" Dombrowski et al. 2020
  - "Candidatus Undinarchaeum" Dombrowski et al. 2020

== Phylum "Huberarchaeaota" ==
=== Class "Huberarchaeia" ===
==== Order "Huberarchaeales" ====
- Family "Huberarchaeaceae" Rinke et al. 2020
  - "Candidatus Huberarchaeum" corrig. Schwank et al. 2019

== Phylum "Aenigmatarchaeota" ==
Phylogeny of "Aenigmatarchaeota"

- "Aenigmatarchaeia"
  - "Aenigmatarchaeaceae"
    "Ca. Aenigmatarchaeum"
  - PWEA01
    "Ca. Haloaenigmatarchaeum"

=== Class "Aenigmatarchaeia" ===
==== Order "Aenigmatarchaeales" ====
- Family "Aenigmatarchaeaceae" corrig. Rinke et al. 2020
  - "Candidatus Aenigmatarchaeum" corrig. Rinke et al. 2013

==== Order PWEA01 ====
- Family "Haloaenigmatarchaeaceae" Gutiérrez-Preciado et al. 2024 [PWEA01]
  - "Candidatus Haloaenigmatarchaeum" Gutiérrez-Preciado et al. 2024

== Phylum "Terrarchaeota" ==
Phylogeny of "Terrarchaeota"

- "Terrarchaeia"
  - "Terrarchaeales"
    - - "Terrarchaeaceae"
        "Ca. Terrarchaeum"
    - - "Lutivulcanarchaeaceae"
        "Ca. Lutivulcanarchaeum"
      - "Marinivulcanaceae"
        "Ca. Marinivulcanus"

=== Class "Terrarchaeia" ===
==== Order "Terrarchaeales" ====
- Family "Lutivulcanarchaeaceae" Kadnikov et al. 2026 ["Gunesarchaceae" Pallen, Rodriguez-R & Alikhan 2022; B79-G9]
  - "Candidatus Lutivulcanarchaeum" Kadnikov et al. 2026 ["Ca. Frasaxarcha" Pallen, Rodriguez-R & Alikhan 2022; GLR112]
- Family "Marinivulcanaceae" Hamm et al. 2026 [WAPT01]
  - "Candidatus Marinivulcanus" Hamm et al. 2026 [WAPT01]
- Family "Terrarchaeaceae" Hamm et al. 2026 ["Caliditerrarchaeaceae" Hamm et al. 2025; GLR71]
  - "Candidatus Terrarchaeum" Hamm et al. 2026 ["Ca. Caliditerrarchaeum" Hamm et al. 2025; GLR71]

== Phylum "Nanohalarchaeota" ==
Phylogeny of "Nanohalarchaeota"

- "Nanohalobiia"
  - "Nanohalobiales"
    - - "Nanohalalkaliarchaeaceae"
        "Ca. Nanohalalkaliarchaeum"
      - "Nanoanaerosalinaceae"
        - "Ca. Asbonarchaeum"
        - "Ca. Nanoanaerosalina"
    - - "Nanohalobiaceae"
        - "Ca. Nanosalinicola"
        - - "Ca. Nanohalococcus"
          - - "Ca. Nanosalina"
            - - "Ca. Nanohalobium"
              - "Ca. Nanohalovita"

=== Class "Nanohalarchaeia" ===
==== Order "Nanohalarchaeales" ====
- Family "Nanohalarchaeaceae"
  - ?"Candidatus Nanohalarchaeum" corrig. Hamm et al. 2019
  - ?"Candidatus Nanopetraeus" corrig. Crits‐Christoph et al. 2016

==== Order "Nanohydrothermales" ====
- Family "Nanohydrothermaceae" Xie et al. 2022
  - ?"Candidatus Nanohydrothermus" Xie et al. 2022

==== Order "Nucleotidisoterales" ====
- Family "Nanosalenecaceae" Xie et al. 2022
  - ?"Candidatus Nanosalenecus" Xie et al. 2022
- Family "Nucleotidisoteraceae" Xie et al. 2022
  - ?"Candidatus Nucleotidisoter" Xie et al. 2022
- Family "Nucleotidivindicaceae" Xie et al. 2022
  - ?"Nucleotidivindex" Xie et al. 2022

=== Class "Nanohalobiia" ===
==== Order "Nanohalobiales" ====
- Family "Nanohalalkaliarchaeaceae" La Cono et al. 2020
  - "Candidatus Nanohalalkaliarchaeum" Ghai et al. 2011
- Family "Nanoanaerosalinaceae" Zhao et al. 2022
  - "Candidatus Asbonarchaeum" Baker et al. 2024
  - "Candidatus Nanoanaerosalina" Zhao et al. 2022
- Family "Nanohalobiaceae" La Cono et al. 2020
  - ?"Candidatus Haloredivivus" Ghai et al. 2011
  - "Candidatus Nanohalobium" La Cono et al. 2020
  - "Candidatus Nanohalococcus" Reva et al. 2023
  - "Candidatus Nanosalina" Narasingarao et al. 2012
  - "Candidatus Nanosalinicola" corrig. Narasingarao et al. 2012
  - "Candidatus Nanohalovita" Reva et al. 2023

== Phylum Nanobdellota ==
Phylogeny of Nanobdellota

- Nanobdellia
  - - - "Tiddalikarchaeales"
        - "Tiddalikarchaeaceae"
          "Ca. Tiddalikarchaeum"
    - - - "JAPDLS01"
          - "Haiyanarchaeaceae"
            "Ca. Haiyanarchaeum"
        - "Jingweiarchaeales"
          - "Jingweiarchaeaceae"
            "Ca. Jingweiarchaeum"
      - - "Parvarchaeales"
          - "Parvarchaeaceae"
            - "Ca. Rehaiarchaeum"
            - - "Ca. Acidifodinimicrobium"
              - "Ca. Parvarchaeum"
  - - - "Pacearchaeales"
      - "Woesearchaeales"
    - - Nanobdellales
        - "Nanoarchaeaceae"
          "Nanoarchaeum"
        - Nanobdellaceae
          - "Ca. Nanoclepta"
          - Nanobdella

=== Class Nanobdellia ===
Order "Pacearchaeales"

Order "Woesearchaeales"

==== Order Nanobdellales ====
- Family "Nanoarchaeaceae" Huber et al. 2011
  - "Nanoarchaeum" Huber et al. 2002
- Family Nanobdellaceae Kato et al. 2022 ["Nanopusillaceae" Huber et al. 2011]
  - Nanobdella Kato et al. 2022 ["Ca. Nanobsidianus" Castelle et al. 2015; "Ca. Nanopusillus" Wurch et al. 2016]
  - "Candidatus Nanoclepta" St. John et al. 2019

==== Order "Tiddalikarchaeales" ====
- Family "Tiddalikarchaeaceae" Vázquez-Campos et al. 2021
  - "Candidatus Tiddalikarchaeum" Vázquez-Campos et al. 2021

==== Order JAPDLS01 ====
- Family "Haiyanarchaeaceae" Rao et al. 2023
  - "Candidatus Haiyanarchaeum" Rao et al. 2023 ["Ca. Tinosarcha" Pallen, Rodriguez-R & Alikhan 2022]

==== Order "Jingweiarchaeales" ====
- Family "Jingweiarchaeaceae" Rao et al. 2023
  - "Candidatus Jingweiarchaeum" Rao et al. 2023

==== Order "Parvarchaeales" ====
- Family "Parvarchaeaceae" Rinke et al. 2020
  - "Candidatus Acidifodinimicrobium" Luo et al. 2020
  - "Candidatus Parvarchaeum" Baker et al. 2010 (ARMAN 4 & 5)
  - "Candidatus Rehaiarchaeum" Rao et al. 2023

== Phylum "Altarchaeota" ==
=== Class "Altarchaeia" ===
==== Order "Altarchaeales" ====
- Family "Altarchaeaceae" corrig. Probst et al. 2014
  - "Candidatus Altarchaeum" corrig. Probst et al. 2014

== Phylum "Iainarchaeota" ==
Phylogeny of "Iainarchaeota"

- "Iainarchaeia"
  - "Forterreales"
    - "Forterreaceae"
      "Ca. Forterrea"
  - "Iainarchaeales"
    - "Iainarchaeaceae"
      "Ca. Iainarchaeum"

=== Class "Iainarchaeia" ===
==== Order "Forterreales" ====
- Family "Forterreaceae" Pallen, Rodriguez-R & Alikhan 2022 [CSSED10-239]
  - "Candidatus Forterrea" Probst & Banfield 2017

==== Order "Iainarchaeales" ====
- Family "Iainarchaeaceae" Rinke et al. 2020
  - "Candidatus Iainarchaeum" Rinke et al. 2013

== Phylum "Micrarchaeota" ==
Phylogeny of "Micrarchaeota"

- "Micrarchaeia"
  - - "Norongarragalinales"
      - "Norongarragalinaceae"
        "Ca. Norongarragalina"
  - - - "Micrarchaeales"
        - "Micrarchaeaceae"
          - "Ca. Mancarchaeum"
          - "Ca. Micrarchaeum"
    - - "Anstonellales"
        - "Anstonellaceae"
          "Ca. Anstonella"
        - "Bilamarchaeaceae"
          "Ca. Bilamarchaeum"
      - "Burarchaeales"
        - - "Gugararchaeaceae"
            "Ca. Gugararchaeum"
        - - "Burarchaeaceae"
            "Ca. Burarchaeum"
          - "Fermentimicrarchaeaceae"
            "Ca. Fermentimicrarchaeum"

=== Class "Micrarchaeia" ===
==== Order "Norongarragalinales" ====
- Family "Norongarragalinaceae" Vázquez-Campos et al. 2021
  - "Candidatus Norongarragalina" Vázquez-Campos et al. 2021

==== Order "Micrarchaeales" ====
- Family "Micrarchaeaceae" Vázquez-Campos et al. 2021
  - "Candidatus Mancarchaeum" Golyshina et al. 2017
  - "Candidatus Micrarchaeum" Baker et al. 2010

==== Order "Anstonellales" ====
- Family "Anstonellaceae" Vázquez-Campos et al. 2021
  - "Candidatus Anstonella" Vázquez-Campos et al. 2021
- Family "Bilamarchaeaceae" Vázquez-Campos et al. 2021
  - "Candidatus Bilamarchaeum" Vázquez-Campos et al. 2021

==== Order "Burarchaeales" ====
- Family "Gugararchaeaceae" Vázquez-Campos et al. 2021
  - "Candidatus Gugararchaeum" Vázquez-Campos et al. 2021
- Family "Burarchaeaceae" Vázquez-Campos et al. 2021
  - "Candidatus Burarchaeum" Vázquez-Campos et al. 2021
- Family "Fermentimicrarchaeaceae" Kadnikov et al. 2020 (Sv326)
  - "Candidatus Fermentimicrarchaeum" Kadnikov et al. 2020

== Phylum Promethearchaeota ==
Taxonomy of this group is based on LPSN, and also these works:

Phylogeny of Promethearchaeota

- - - "Asgardarchaeia"
      "Asgardarchaeales"
    - "Thorarchaeia"
      "Thorarchaeales"
  - - - "Atabeyarchaeia"
        "Atabeyarchaeales"
    - - - - "Baldrarchaeia"
            "Baldrarchaeales"
          - "Jordiarchaeia"
            "Jordiarchaeales"
        - - - "Odinarchaeia"
              "Odinarchaeales"
          - - "Hermodarchaeia"
              "Hermodarchaeales"
            - Promethearchaeia
              - "Helarchaeales"
              - Promethearchaeales
      - - - "Borrarchaeia"
            - "Borrarchaeales"
            - "Sifarchaeales"
        - - - "Wukongarchaeia"
              "Wukongarchaeales"
          - - "Njordarchaeia"
              "Njordarchaeales"
            - "Heimdallarchaeia"
              - "Hodarchaeales"
              - - "Gerdarchaeales" (JABLTI01)
                - "Heimdallarchaeales"

=== Promethearchaeota incertae sedis ===
- ?"Friggarchaeota" Caceres 2019
- ?"Gefionarchaeota" Caceres 2019
- ?"Idunnarchaeota" Caceres 2019
- ?"Kexuearchaeota" Cai et al. 2021
- ?"Sleipnirarchaeota" Kioukis et al. 2025
- ?"Candidatus Balderarchaeum" Xie et al. 2022
- ?"Candidatus Ranarchaeum" Appler et al. 2026
- ?"Candidatus Sukunaarchaeum" Harada et al. 2025
- ?"Candidatus Tyrarchaeum" Xie et al. 2022

=== Class "Asgardarchaeia" ===
==== Order "Asgardarchaeales" ====
- Family "Asgardarchaeaceae" Eme et al. 2023 ex Tamarit et al. 2024
  - "Candidatus Asgardarchaeum" Eme et al. 2023 ex Tamarit et al. 2024

=== Class "Thorarchaeia" ===
==== Order "Thorarchaeales" ====
- Family "Thorarchaeaceae" (MBG-B)

=== Class "Atabeyarchaeia" ===
==== Order "Atabeyarchaeales" ====
- Family "Atabeyarchaeaceae" Valentin-Alvaradoet al. 2024
  - "Candidatus Atabeyarchaeum" Valentin-Alvarado et al. 2024

=== Class "Baldrarchaeia" ===
==== Order "Baldrarchaeales" ====
- Family "Baldrarchaeaceae" corrig. Liu et al. 2021
  - "Candidatus Baldrarchaeum" Liu et al. 2021

=== Class "Jordarchaeia" ===
==== Order "Jordarchaeales" ====
- Family "Freyrarchaeaceae" Xie et al. 2022
  - "Candidatus Freyrarchaeum" Xie et al. 2022
- Family "Jordarchaeaceae" Sun et al. 2021
  - "Candidatus Jordarchaeum" Sun et al. 2021 ["Ca. Freyarchaeum" (sic) Valentin-Alvarado et al. 2024]

=== Class "Odinarchaeia" ===
==== Order "Odinarchaeales" ====
- Family "Odinarchaeaceae" Tamarit et al. 2022
  - "Candidatus Odinarchaeum" Tamarit et al. 2022

=== Class "Hermodarchaeia" ===
==== Order "Hermodarchaeales" ====
- Family "Hermodarchaeaceae" corrig. Liu et al. 2021
  - "Candidatus Hermodarchaeum" Liu et al. 2021

=== Class Promethearchaeia ===
==== Order Promethearchaeales ====
Phylogeny of "Promethearchaeales"

- - "Sigynarchaeaceae"
    "Ca. Sigynarchaeum"
  - Promethearchaeaceae
    - Prometheoarchaeum
    - - "Ca. Harpocratesius"
      - "Ca. Lokiarchaeum"

- Family "Sigynarchaeaceae" Xie et al. 2022
  - "Candidatus Sigynarchaeum" Xie et al. 2022
- Family Promethearchaeaceae Imachi et al. 2024
  - "Candidatus Harpocratesius" Wu et al. 2022
  - "Candidatus Lokiarchaeum" corrig. Spang et al. 2015 (MBGB, DSAG)
  - "Candidatus Nerearchaeum" Nobs et al. 2026
  - Promethearchaeum Imachi et al. 2024

=== Class "Borrarchaeia" ===
==== Order "Sifarchaeales" ====
- Family "Sifarchaeaceae" Sun et al. 2021
  - "Candidatus Sifarchaeum" corrig. Farag, Zhao & Biddle 2020

==== Order "Borrarchaeales" ====
- Family "Borrarchaeaceae" Liu et al. 2021
  - "Candidatus Borrarchaeum" Liu et al. 2021

=== Class "Wukongarchaeia" ===
==== Order "Wukongarchaeales" ====
- Family "Wukongarchaeaceae" Liu et al. 2021
  - "Candidatus Wukongarchaeum" Liu et al. 2021

=== Class "Njordarchaeia" ===
==== Order "Njordarchaeales" ====
- Family "Panguiarchaeaceae" Qu et al. 2023
  - "Panguiarchaeum" Qu et al. 2023
- Family "Njordarchaeaceae" Xie et al. 2022
  - "Candidatus Njordarchaeum" Xie et al. 2022

=== Class "Heimdallarchaeia" ===
- ?"Candidatus Ymjarchaeum" MacLeod et al. 2025 ["Ca. Yibarchaeum" MacLeod et al. 2025]

==== Order "Hodarchaeales" ====
- Family "Hodarchaeaceae" Liu et al. 2021
  - "Candidatus Hodarchaeum" Liu et al. 2021
- Family "Margulisarchaeaceae" Imachi et al. 2025
  - ?"Candidatus Flexarchaeum" Imachi et al. 2025
  - ?"Candidatus Margulisarchaeum" Imachi et al. 2025

==== Order "Heimdallarchaeales" ====
- Family "Kariarchaeaceae" Liu et al. 2021
  - "Candidatus Kariarchaeum" Liu et al. 2021
- Family "Heimdallarchaeaceae" Wu et al. 2022
  - "Candidatus Heimdallarchaeum" Wu et al. 2022

== Phylum "Korarchaeota" ==
Phylogeny of "Korarchaeota"

- "Korarchaeia"
  - "Korarchaeaceae"
    - "Ca. Korarchaeum"
    - "Ca. Methanodesulfokora"

=== Class "Korarchaeia" ===
==== Order "Korarchaeales" ====
- Family "Korarchaeaceae" Rinke et al. 2020
  - "Candidatus Korarchaeum" Elkins et al. 2008
  - "Candidatus Methanodesulfokora" McKay et al. 2019

== Phylum Thermoproteota ==
Phylogeny of Thermoproteota

- - "BAT"
    - - CALKCG01
        "Bifangarchaeales"
      - "Bathyarchaeia"
        - - "Xuanwuarculales"
          - - "Hecatellales"
            - "Houtuarculales"
        - - "Wuzhiqiibiales"
          - - "Zhuquarculales"
            - "Bathyarchaeales"
    - - "Caldarchaeia"
        "Caldarchaeales"
      - Nitrososphaeria
        - "Geothermarchaeales"
        - - PSMU01
          - - Conexivisphaerales
            - Nitrososphaerales
  - "Sulfobacteria"
    - - Methanosuratincolia
        - Methanosuratincolales
        - - "Methanonezhaarchaeales"
          - "Culexarchaeales"
    - - "Thermoproteia"
        - "Gearchaeales"
        - - Thermofilales
          - Thermoproteales
      - "Sulfolobia"
        - "Tardisphaerales"
        - Sulfolobales

=== Class CALKCG01 ===
==== Order "Bifangarchaeales" ====
- Family "Bifangicolaceae" Hou et al. 2023
  - ?"Candidatus Bifangicola" Hou et al. 2023 [3300025546_26]
- Family "Bifangarchaeaceae" Hou et al. 2023 [B24]
  - "Candidatus Bifangarchaeum" corrig. Hou et al. 2023 [DTBU01 sp011374155]
- Family "Bifangistellaceae" Hou et al. 2023 [DRYS01]
  - "Candidatus Bifangistella" Hou et al. 2023 [DRYS01 sp011367275]

=== Class "Bathyarchaeia" ===
==== Order "Xuanwuarculales" ====
- Family "Mazuisomaceae" Hou et al. 2023
  - ?"Candidatus Mazuisoma" Hou et al. 2023
- Family "Mazuicellaceae" Hou et al. 2023
  - ?"Candidatus Mazuibellus" Hou et al. 2023
  - ?"Candidatus Mazuicella" Hou et al. 2023
- Family "Mazuousiaecae" Hou et al. 2023
  - ?"Candidatus Mazuarcula" Hou et al. 2023
  - ?"Candidatus Mazuousia" Hou et al. 2023
- Family "Xuanwuarculaceae" Hou et al. 2023
  - "Candidatus Xuanwuarcula" Hou et al. 2023 [RBG-16-48-13 sp001775995]

==== Order "Hecatellales" ====
Phylogeny of "Hecatellales"

- "Hecatellaceae"
  - - "Ca. Hecatella"
    - "Ca. Jinwuarcula"
  - - "Ca. Jinwuicola"
    - "Ca. Jinwuimorpha"

- Family "Hecatellaceae" Rinke et al. 2020 ["Jinwuarculaceae" Hou et al. 2023; "Jinwuicolaceae" Hou et al. 2023; "Jinwuimonadaceae" Hou et al. 2023; "Jinwuiprofundaceae" Hou et al. 2023; "Jinwuousiaceae" Hou et al. 2023]
  - "Candidatus Hecatella" Adam et al. 2022
  - "Candidatus Jinwuarcula" Hou et al. 2023 [B25]
  - "Candidatus Jinwuicola" Hou et al. 2023 [EX4484-218 sp002254975]
  - ?"Candidatus Jinwuimonas" Hou et al. 2023
  - "Candidatus Jinwuimorpha" Hou et al. 2023 [EX4484-218 sp003661965]
  - ?"Candidatus Jinwuiprofundus" Hou et al. 2023
  - ?"Candidatus Jinwuousia" Hou et al. 2023 [JdFR-11 sp002011035]

==== Order "Houtuarculales" ====
Phylogeny of "Houtuarculales"

- - - "Crenohoutuithermaceae"
      "Ca. Crenohoutuithermus"
    - "Fontihoutuithermaceae"
      "Ca. Fontihoutuithermus"
  - - "Aphrohoutuibellaceae"
      - "Ca. Aphrohoutuibellus"
      - "Ca. Hydrohoutuibellus"
    - "Houtuousiaceae"
      - "Ca. Houtuousia"
      - "Ca. Houtuarcula"

- Family "Houtuithermaceae" Hou et al. 2023
  - ?"Candidatus Houtuithermus" Hou et al. 2023
- Family "Marihoutuimonadaceae" Hou et al. 2023
  - ?"Candidatus Houtuibellus" Hou et al. 2023
  - ?"Candidatus Marihoutuimonas" Hou et al. 2023
- Family "Crenohoutuithermaceae" Hou et al. 2023
  - "Candidatus Crenohoutuithermus" Hou et al. 2023 [DTDX01]
- Family "Fontihoutuithermaceae" Hou et al. 2023 ["Fluxihoutuithermaceae" Hou et al. 2023; DTGE01]
  - ?"Candidatus Fluxihoutuithermus" Hou et al. 2023 [DTOY01 sp011358085]
  - "Candidatus Fontihoutuithermus" Hou et al. 2023 [DTGE01 sp011389385]
- Family "Aphrohoutuibellaceae" Hou et al. 2023 [RBG-13-38-9]
  - "Candidatus Aphrohoutuibellus" Hou et al. 2023 [RBG-13-38-9]
  - "Candidatus Hydrohoutuibellus" Hou et al. 2023 [DTMT01 sp011355205]
- Family "Houtuousiaceae" Hou et al. 2023 ["Houtuarculaceae" Hou et al. 2023; "Limnohoutuiplasmataceae" corrig. Hou et al. 2023; 40CM-2-53-6]
  - "Candidatus Houtuousia" Hou et al. 2023 [40CM-2-53-6]
  - "Candidatus Houtuarcula" Hou et al. 2023 [FEN-987]
  - ?"Candidatus Limnohoutuiplasma" Hou et al. 2023

==== Order "Wuzhiqiibiales" ====
Phylogeny of "Wuzhiqiibiales"

- - - "Wuzhiqiimorphaceae"
      "Ca. Wuzhiqiimorpha"
  - - "Wuzhiqiimonadaceae"
      "Ca. Wuzhiqiimonas"
    - "Wuzhiqiibiaceae"
      "Ca. Wuzhiqiibium"

- Family "Wuzhiqiithermaceae" Hou et al. 2023
  - ?"Candidatus Wuzhiqiithermus" Hou et al. 2023
- Family "Wuzhiqiitorraceae" Hou et al. 2023
  - ?"Candidatus Wuzhiqiitorris" Hou et al. 2023
- Family "Wuzhiqiimorphaceae" Hou et al. 2023 [PIYN01]
  - "Candidatus Wuzhiqiimorpha" Hou et al. 2023 [PIYN01 sp003601775]
- Family "Wuzhiqiimonadaceae" Hou et al. 2023 [B23]
  - "Candidatus Wuzhiqiimonas" Hou et al. 2023 [B23]
- Family "Wuzhiqiibiaceae" Hou et al. 2023
  - "Candidatus Wuzhiqiibium" Hou et al. 2023 [TCS64]

==== Order "Zhuquarculales" ====
- Family "Zhuquarculaceae" Hou et al. 2023
  - "Candidatus Zhuquarcula" Hou et al. 2023 [EX4484-135]
- Family "Zhuquomorphaceae" Hou et al. 2023 [B24-G1]
  - "Candidatus Zhuquomorpha" Hou et al. 2023

==== Order "Bathyarchaeales" ====
Phylogeny of "Bathyarchaeales"

- - - "Pontizhurongicolaceae"
      "Ca. Pontizhurongicola"
  - - - "Hanbarchaeaceae"
        - "Ca. Hanbarchaeum"
        - - "Ca. Fufeiimorpha"
          - "Ca. Zhurongicella"
      - "Marizhurongicellaceae"
        - "Ca. Marizhurongibium"
        - "Ca. Marizhurongicella"
    - - - "Hanbopyraceae"
          "Ca. Hanbopyrus"
      - - - "Jingweiiplasmataceae"
            "Ca. Jingweiiplasma"
          - "Bathyarchaeaceae"
            - "Ca. Baizosoma"
            - - "Ca. Halozhurongicella"
              - - "Ca. Baizobellus"
                - "Ca. Bathyarchaeum"
        - - "Baizomorphaceae"
            "Ca. Baizomorpha"
          - "Bathycorpusculaceae"
            - - "Ca. Buyanhuyuitorris"
              - "Ca. Buyanhuyuicella"
            - - - "Ca. Hanbocola"
                - "Ca. Hanbothermus"
              - - "Ca. Yanziithermus"
                - - "Ca. Yuguotorris"
                  - "Ca. Bathycorpusculum"

- Family "Actozhurongousiaceae" Hou et al. 2023
  - ?"Candidatus Actozhurongousia" Hou et al. 2023
- Family "Yuguousiaceae" Hou et al. 2023
  - ?"Candidatus Yuguousia" Hou et al. 2023
- Family "Pontizhurongicolaceae" Hou et al. 2023
  - "Candidatus Pontizhurongicola" Hou et al. 2023 [B24-2 sp002490245]
- Family "Hanbarchaeaceae" Hou et al. 2023 ["Zhurongicellaceae" Hou et al. 2023; DTEX01]
  - "Candidatus Fufeiimorpha" Hou et al. 2023 [PIYB01]
  - "Candidatus Hanbarchaeum" Hou et al. 2023 [DTEX01]
  - "Candidatus Zhurongicella" Hou et al. 2023 [B63]
- Family "Marizhurongicellaceae" Hou et al. 2023 [B26-1]
  - ?"Candidatus Aoguangisoma" Hou et al. 2023
  - "Candidatus Marizhurongibium" Hou et al. 2023 [B17-G17 sp003662645]
  - "Candidatus Marizhurongicella" Hou et al. 2023 [B26-1]
  - ?"Candidatus Yanziimonas" Hou et al. 2023
  - ?"Candidatus Zhurongibium" Hou et al. 2023
- Family "Hanbopyraceae" Hou et al. 2023
  - "Candidatus Hanbopyrus" Hou et al. 2023 [WUQV01 sp009889585]
- Family "Jingweiiplasmataceae" Hou et al. 2023 [SOJC01]
  - "Candidatus Jingweiiplasma" Hou et al. 2023 [SOJC01]
- Family "Bathyarchaeaceae" Khomyakova et al. 2023 ["Baizosomaceae" Hou et al. 2023; "Baizostellaceae" Hou et al. 2023; "Halozhurongicellaceae" Hou et al. 2023]
  - "Candidatus Baizobellus" Hou et al. 2023 [SOJZ01]
  - ?"Candidatus Baizosediminiarchaeum" Yu et al. 2023 [BIN-L-1]
  - "Candidatus Baizosoma" Hou et al. 2023 [BA1 sp001399805]
  - ?"Candidatus Baizostella" Hou et al. 2023
  - "Candidatus Bathyarchaeum" Khomyakova et al. 2023
  - "Candidatus Halozhurongicella" Hou et al. 2023 [B1-G15]
- Family "Baizomorphaceae" Hou et al. 2023 [UBA233]
  - "Candidatus Baizomorpha" Hou et al. 2023
- Family "Bathycorpusculaceae" Loh & Brune 2023 ["Aoshunithermaceae" Hou et al. 2023; "Baizomonadaceae" Hou et al. 2023; "Buyanhuyuicellaceae" Hou et al. 2023; "Hanbothermaceae" Hou et al. 2023; "Yanziithermaceae" Hou et al. 2023; "Yuguotorraceae" corrig. Hou et al. 2023]
  - ?"Candidatus Aoshunithermus" Hou et al. 2023
  - ?"Candidatus Baizomonas" Hou et al. 2023
  - "Candidatus Bathycorpusculum" Loh & Brune 2023 ["Ca. Hafrusarcha" Pallen, Rodriguez-R & Alikhan 2022]
  - "Candidatus Buyanhuyuicella" Hou et al. 2023 [SOJA01]
  - "Candidatus Buyanhuyuitorris" Hou et al. 2023 [PIYA01]
  - "Candidatus Hanbocola" Hou et al. 2023 [DSZD01]
  - "Candidatus Hanbothermus" Hou et al. 2023 [DRVP01]
  - "Candidatus Yanziithermus" Hou et al. 2023 [JdFR-07]
  - "Candidatus Yuguotorris" Hou et al. 2023 [DSLH01]

=== Class "Caldarchaeia" ===
==== Order "Caldarchaeales" ====
Phylogeny of "Caldarchaeales"

- - - "Calditenuaceae"
      - "Ca. Caldarincola"
      - - "Ca. Candentenecus"
        - "Ca. Calditenuis"
  - - "Caldarchaeaceae"
      - "Ca. Caldarchaeum"
      - "Ca. Pelearchaeum"
    - "Wolframiiraptoraceae"
      - "Ca. Terraquivivens"
      - - "Ca. Geocrenenecus"
        - - "Ca. Benthortus"
          - "Ca. Wolframiiraptor"

- Family "Calditenuaceae" Balbay et al. 2023
  - ?"Candidatus Ardentivivens" Lai et al. 2026
  - "Candidatus Caldarincola " Lai et al. 2016 [JANXDH01 ]
  - "Candidatus Candentenecus" Lai et al. 2016 [HRBIN02]
  - ?"Candidatus Kaftiomonas" Lai et al. 2016
  - "Candidatus Calditenuis" Beam et al. 2016
- Family "Caldarchaeaceae" Rinke et al. 2020
  - "Candidatus Caldarchaeum" corrig. Nunoura et al. 2011
  - "Candidatus Pelearchaeum" Balbay et al. 2023 ["Ca. Cadrafarcha" Pallen, Rodriguez-R & Alikhan 2022]
- Family "Wolframiiraptoraceae" Buessecker et al. 2022
  - "Candidatus Benthortus" Buessecker et al. 2022
  - "Candidatus Geocrenenecus" Buessecker et al. 2022
  - "Candidatus Terraquivivens" Buessecker et al. 2022
  - "Candidatus Wolframiiraptor" Buessecker et al. 2022

=== Class Nitrososphaeria ===
==== Nitrososphaeria incertae sedis ====
- ?"Candidatus Cenoporarchaeum" corrig. Zhang et al. 2019
- ?"Candidatus Gigantothauma" corrig. Muller et al. 2010
- ?"Candidatus Nitrosodeserticola" Hwang et al. 2021

==== Order "Geothermarchaeales" ====
- Family "Geothermarchaeaceae" Adam et al. 2022
  - "Candidatus Geothermarchaeum" Adam et al. 2022
  - "Candidatus Scotarchaeum" Adam et al. 2022

==== Order PSMU01 ====
- Family PSMU01
  - "Candidatus Australarchaeum" Herbold et al. 2024

==== Order Conexivisphaerales ====
- Family Conexivisphaeraceae Kato et al. 2021 (THSC Group)
  - Conexivisphaera Kato et al. 2021
- Family "Thermosulfuridaceae" Chang et al. 2026
  - "Acidarchaeum" Chang et al. 2026 [JAJZYL01]
  - ?"Thermosulfuris" Chang et al. 2026

==== Order Nitrososphaerales ====
Phylogeny of Nitrososphaerales

- - - "Gagatemarchaeaceae"
      "Ca. Gagatemarchaeum"
  - - - "Nitrosomiraceae"
        "Ca. Nitrosomirus"
      - "Nitrosocaldaceae"
        - "Ca. Nitrosothermus"
        - "Ca. Nitrosocaldus"
    - - Nitrososphaeraceae
        - "Ca. Nitrosobungeria"
        - - - Nitrososphaera_A
            - "Ca. Nitrosopolaris"
          - - Nitrososphaera
            - - "Ca. Nitrosomicrobium"
              - "Ca. Nitrosocosmicus"
      - Nitrosopumilaceae
        - Nitrosotalea
        - - "Ca. Nitrosotenuis"
          - - "Ca. Nitrosopelagicus"
            - - "Ca. Nitrosoabyssus"
              - - "Ca. Cenarchaeum"
                - - Nitrosarchaeum
                  - - "Ca. Nitrosomaritimum"
                    - Nitrosopumilus

- Family "Methylarchaceae" Hua et al. 2019
  - ?"Candidatus Methylarchaeum" Hua et al. 2019
  - ?"Candidatus Methanotowutia" Ou et al. 2022
- Family "Gagatemarchaeaceae" Sheridan et al. 2023 [UBA183]
  - "Candidatus Gagatemarchaeum" Sheridan et al. 2023 [Bog-1369; GCA_003164815.1]
  - ?"Candidatus Subgagatemarchaeum" Sheridan et al. 2023 [Fn1; IMG2558309099]
- Family "Nitrosomiraceae" Zheng et al. 2024 [UBA213]
  - "Candidatus Nitrosomirus" Zheng et al. 2024
- Family "Nitrosocaldaceae" Qin et al. 2016
  - "Candidatus Nitrosocaldus" de la Torre et al. 2008
  - "Candidatus Nitrosothermus" Luo et al. 2021
- Family Nitrososphaeraceae Stieglmeier et al. 2014
  - "Candidatus Nitrosobungeria" Tan et al. 2026 [TH5893]
  - "Candidatus Nitrosocosmicus" corrig. Lehtovirta-Morley et al. 2016
  - "Candidatus Nitrosomicrobium" Tan et al. 2026 [TA-21]
  - "Candidatus Nitrosopolaris" Pessi, Rutanen & Hultman 2022 ["Ca. Flebogarcha" Pallen, Rodriguez-R & Alikhan 2022]
  - ?"Candidatus Nitrososappho" Singleton et al. 2025
  - Nitrososphaera Stieglmeier et al. 2014
- Family Nitrosopumilaceae Qin et al. 2017
  - "Ca. Cenarchaeum" DeLong & Preston 1996
  - Nitrosarchaeum corrig. Jung et al. 2018
  - "Candidatus Nitrosoabyssus" Garritano et al. 2024
  - ?"Candidatus Nitrosokoinonia" Glasl et al. 2023
  - "Candidatus Nitrosomaritimum" Zhao et al. 2024
  - "Candidatus Nitrosopelagicus" Santoro et al. 2015
  - Nitrosopumilus Qin et al. 2017 ["Ca. Nitrosomarinus" Ahlgren et al. 2017]
  - ?"Candidatus Nitrosospongia" Moeller et al. 2019
  - Nitrosotalea Lehtovirta 2024
  - "Candidatus Nitrosotenuis" Lebedeva et al. 2013

=== Class Methanosuratincolia ===
==== Order "Methanohydrogenicales" ====
- Family "Methanohydrogenicaceae" Berghuis et al. 2019
  - ?"Candidatus Methanohydrogenicus" Berghuis et al. 2019

==== Order "Methanomethylarchaeales" ====
- Family "Methanomethylarchaeceae" corrig. Hua et al. 2019
  - ?"Candidatus Methanomethylarchaeum" corrig. Hua et al. 2019

==== Order "Methanomethylovorales" ====
- Family "Methanomethylovoraceae" Hua et al. 2019
  - ?"Candidatus Methanomethylovorus" Hua et al. 2019

==== Order "Methanonezhaarchaeales" ====
- Family "Methanohydrogenotrophicaceae" Hua et al. 2019
  - ?"Candidatus Methanogearchaeum" corrig. Hua et al. 2019
  - ?"Candidatus Methanohydrogenotrophicum" Hua et al. 2019
- Family "Methanonezhaarchaeceae" Kohtz, Nupp & Hatzenpichler 2025 [WYZ-LMO8]
  - "Candidatus Methanonezhaarchaeum" Kohtz, Nupp & Hatzenpichler 2025 [WYZ-LMO8]
- Family "Muzhaarchaeaceae" [B40-G2: B40-G2]

==== Order "Culexarchaeales" ====
Phylogeny of "Culexarchaeales"

- - - "Culexarchaeaceae"
      "Ca. Culexarchaeum"
  - - B10‑G16
      "Ca. Culexmicrobium_B"
    - "Culexmicrobiaceae"
      "Ca. Culexmicrobium"

- Family "Culexarchaeaceae" Kohtz et al. 2022 ["Methanomediaceae" Berghuis et al. 2019]
  - "Candidatus Culexarchaeum" Kohtz et al. 2022 ["Ca. Methanomedium" Berghuis et al. 2019]
- Family "Culexmicrobiaceae" Kohtz et al. 2022
  - "Candidatus Culexmicrobium" Kohtz et al. 2022
- Family B10-G16
  - "Candidatus Culexmicrobium_B"

==== Order Methanosuratincolales ====
- Family Methanosuratincolaceae Wu et al. 2025
  - ?"Candidatus Methanoluiimicrobium" Wu et al. 2024
  - "Candidatus Methanomethylicus" Vanwonterghem et al. 2016
  - ?"Candidatus Methanostamsia" Wu et al. 2024
  - Methanosuratinicola Wu et al. 2025

=== Class Thermoproteia ===
==== Order "Gearchaeales" ====
- Family "Gearchaeaceae" corrig.
  - ?Geoarchaeum (sic) Hunt et al. 2016

==== Order Thermofilales ====
- Family Thermofilaceae Burggraf, Huber & Stetter 1997
  - Infirmifilum Zayulina et al. 2021
  - Thermofilum Zillig & Gierl 1983

==== Order Thermoproteales ====
Phylogeny of Thermoproteales

- - Thermocladiaceae
    - - Caldivirga
      - Thermocladium
    - Vulcanisaeta
  - Thermoproteaceae
    - Thermoproteus
    - Pyrobaculum

- Family Thermocladiaceae Chuvochina et al. 2024
  - Caldivirga Itoh et al. 1999
  - Thermocladium Itoh, Suzuki & Nakase 1998
  - Vulcanisaeta Itoh, Suzuki & Nakase 2002
- Family Thermoproteaceae Zillig & Stetter 1982
  - Pyrobaculum Huber, Kristjansson & Stetter 1988
  - Thermoproteus Zillig & Stetter 1982

=== Class "Sulfolobia" ===
==== Order "Tardisphaerales" ====
- Family "Marsarchaeaceae" (sic) (NAG2, NCGII)
- Family "Tardisphaerace" Prokofeva et al. 2025
  - ?"Tardisphaera" Prokofeva et al. 2025

==== Order Sulfolobales ====
Phylogeny of Sulfolobales

- - - - Desulfurococcaceae
        - Staphylothermus
        - - Thermogladius
          - - Thermosphaera
            - Desulfurococcus
    - - - Fervidicoccaceae
          Fervidicoccus
      - - - Ignicoccaceae
            Ignicoccus
          - Pyrodictiaceae
            - Pyrolobus
            - - Hyperthermus
              - - Pyrofollis
                - Pyrodictium
        - - Acidilobaceae
            - "Ca. Tiamatella"
            - - "Ca. Calypsonella"
              - - - Thermodiscus
                  - Aeropyrum
                - - Caldisphaera
                  - Acidilobus
  - - - Ignisphaeraceae
        Ignisphaera
      - "Zestosphaeraceae"
        Zestosphaera
    - - Sulfolobaceae
        - Sulfodiicoccus
        - - - Sulfurisphaera
            - - Stygiolobus
              - Sulfolobus
          - - - Sulfuracidifex
              - Saccharolobus
            - - Metallosphaera
              - - "Ca. Aramenus"
                - Acidianus

- Family Desulfurococcaceae Zillig & Stetter 1983
  - Desulfurococcus Zillig & Stetter 1983
  - Staphylothermus Stetter & Fiala 1986
  - ?Sulfophobococcus Hensel et al. 1997
  - Thermogladius Osburn & Amend 2011 ex Kochetkova et al. 2016
  - Thermosphaera Huber et al. 1998
  - ?"Candidatus Zestomicrobium" Dzhuraeva, Bobodzhanova & Birkeland 2024
- Family Fervidicoccaceae Perevalova et al. 2010
  - Fervidicoccus Perevalova et al. 2010
- Family Pyrodictiaceae Burggraf, Huber & Stetter 1997
  - ?Geogemma Kashefi, Holmes & Lovley 2006
  - Hyperthermus Zillig, Holz & Wunderl 1991
  - ?"Candidatus Pyroantarcticum " de Araújo Butarelli et al. 2026
  - Pyrodictium Stetter, König & Stackebrandt 1984
  - "Pyrofollis" Miyazaki et al. 2023
  - Pyrolobus Blochl et al. 1999
- Family Acidilobaceae Prokofeva et al. 2009
  - Aeropyrum Sako et al. 1996
  - Acidilobus Prokofeva et al. 2000
  - Caldisphaera Itoh et al. 2003 ["Ca. Hestiella" St-John and Reysenbach 2024]
  - "Candidatus Calypsonella" St John and Reysenbach 2024
  - ?Stetteria Jochimsen, Peinemann-Simon & Thomm 1998
  - Thermodiscus Stetter 2003
  - "Candidatus Tiamatella" St John and Reysenbach 2024
- Family Ignisphaeraceae RChuvochina et al. 2024
  - Ignisphaera Niederberger et al. 2006
- Family "Zestosphaeraceae" Pallen, Rodriguez-R & Alikhan 2022
  - Zestosphaera St. John et al. 2021
- Family Ignicoccaceae Chuvochina et al. 2024
  - Ignicoccus Huber, Burggraf & Stetter 2000
- Family Sulfolobaceae Stetter 1989
  - Acidianus Segerer et al. 1986 ["Sulfosphaerellus" Zhong et al. 1982; Desulfurolobus Zillig & Böck 1987]
  - "Candidatus Aramenus" Servín-Garcidueñas & Martínez-Romero 2014
  - ?"Caldariella" de Rosa, Gambacorta & Bu'lock 1975
  - Metallosphaera Huber et al. 1989
  - Saccharolobus Sakai & Kurosawa 2018
  - Stygiolobus Segerer et al. 1991
  - Sulfodiicoccus Sakai & Kurosawa 2017
  - Sulfolobus Brock et al. 1972
  - Sulfuracidifex Itoh et al. 2020
  - Sulfurisphaera Kurosawa et al. 1998
  - ?Sulfurococcus Golovacheva, Vale’kho & Troitskii 1995

== Phylum AGJL01 ==
Phylogeny of Methanobacteriota

- "Methanococcia"
  - Methanococcales
    - Methanocaldococcaceae
      Methanocaldococcus
    - Methanococcaceae
      - Methanotorris
      - - Methanofervidicoccus
        - - Methanothermococcus
          - Methanococcus

=== Class "Methanococcia" ===
==== Order Methanococcales ====
- Family Methanocaldococcaceae Whitman 2002
  - Methanocaldococcus Whitman 2002
- Family Methanococcaceae Balch & Wolfe 1981
  - Methanococcus Kluyver & van Niel 1936
  - Methanofervidicoccus Sakai et al. 2019
  - Methanothermococcus Whitman 2002
  - Methanotorris Whitman 2002 ["Methanoignis" Boone, Whitman & Rouviére 1993]

== Phylum JAADCQ01 ==
=== Class "Methanopyria" ===
==== Order Methanopyrales ====
- Family Methanopyraceae Huber & Stetter 2002
  - Methanopyrus Kurr et al. 1992

== Phylum "Hydrothermarchaeota" ==
=== Class "Hydrothermarchaeia" ===
==== Order "Hydrothermarchaeales" ====
- Family "Hydrothermarchaeaceae" Chuvochina et al. 2019
  - "Candidatus Hydrothermarchaeum" Chuvochina et al. 2019
- Family BMS3B
  - "Candidatus Pyrohabitans" Adam et al. 2022

== Phylum "Hadarchaeota" ==
=== Class "Hadarchaeia" ===
==== Order "Hadarchaeales" ====
- Family "Cerberiarchaeaceae" Benito Merino et al. 2024
  - ?"Candidatus Cerberiarchaeum" Benito Merino et al. 2024
  - ?"Candidatus Melinoarchaeum" Yu et al. 2024
- Family "Hadarchaeaceae" Chuvochina et al. 2019 ex Chuvochina et al. 2023
  - "Candidatus Hadarchaeum" Chuvochina et al. 2019
  - ?"Candidatus Hadesarchaeum" Hua et al. 2019
  - ?"Candidatus Methanourarchaeum" Hua et al. 2019

== Phylum Methanobacteriota_B ==
=== Class "Thermococcia" ===
Phylogeny of "Thermococcia"

- - "Thermococcia"
    - "Methanofastidiosales" "Methanofastidiosaceae"
      "Ca. Methanofastidiosum"
    - Thermococcales Thermococcaceae
      - Palaeococcus
      - - Thermococcus_A
        - - - Thermococcus_B
            - Pyrococcus
          - Thermococcus

==== Order "Methanofastidiosales" ====
- Family "Methanofastidiosaceae" Rinke et al. 2020
  - "Candidatus Methanofastidiosum" Nobu et al. 2016

==== Order Thermococcales ====
- Family Thermococcaceae Zillig et al. 1988
  - Palaeococcus Takai et al. 2000
  - Pyrococcus Fiala & Stetter 1986
  - Thermococcus Zillig 1983 ["Caldococcus" Svetlichny et al. 1987]

== Phylum Methanobacteriota ==
Phylogeny of Methanobacteriota

- "Methanobacteriia"
  - DSM‑2088
    - Methanothermaceae
      Methanothermus
  - Methanobacteriales
    - - DSM‑23052
        Methanothermobacter_A
    - - Methanothermobacteraceae
        Methanothermobacter
      - Methanobacteriaceae
        - - - "Methanacia"
            - - Methanoflexus
              - "Methanovirga"
          - - - "Methanorudis"
              - - Methanobaculum
                - Methanobinarius
            - - Methanocatella
              - - Methanobrevibacter_A
                - - Methanarmilla
                  - Methanobrevibacter
        - - - Methanobacterium_E
            - Methanobacterium_F
          - - Methanobacterium_D
            - - Methanosphaera
              - Methanobacterium

=== Class "Methanobacteriia" ===
==== Order DSM-2088 ====
- Family Methanothermaceae Stetter et al. 1982
  - Methanothermus Stetter et al. 1982

==== Order Methanobacteriales ====
- Family Methanothermobacteraceae Chuvochina et al. 2024
  - Methanothermobacter Wasserfallen et al. 2000
- Family Methanobacteriaceae Barker 1956
  - "Methanacia" Protasov & Brune 2023
  - Methanarmilla Protasov & Brune 2026
  - Methanobacterium Kluyver & van Niel 1936
  - Methanobaculum Protasov & Brune 2026
  - Methanobinarius Protasov & Brune 2026
  - Methanobrevibacter Balch & Wolfe 1981
  - Methanocatella Protasov & Brune 2026
  - Methanoflexus Protasov & Brune 2026
  - "Methanorudis" Protasov & Brune 2023
  - Methanosphaera Miller & Wolin 1985
  - "Methanovirga" Protasov & Brune 2023

== Phylum Thermoplasmatota ==
Phylogeny of Thermoplasmatota

- - - "Izemarchaea"
      "Thermoprofundales"
  - - - "Poseidoniia"
        - MGIII
        - "Poseidoniales"
    - - "Penumbrarchaeia"
        "Penumbrarchaeales"
      - "Thermoplasmatia"
        - - - "Proteinoplasmatales"
            - "Yaplasmatales"
          - - "Sysuiplasmatales"
            - - "Gimiplasmatales"
              - Methanomassiliicoccales
        - - "Halarchaeoplasmatales"
          - - "Lutacidiplasmatales"
            - "Thermoplasmatales"

=== Class "Izemarchaea" ===
==== Order "Thermoprofundales" ====
- (MBG-D, E2)

=== Class "Poseidoniia" ===
==== Order "Poseidoniales" ====
- Family "Poseidoniaceae" Rinke et al. 2019
  - "Candidatus Poseidonia" Rinke et al. 2019
- Family "Thalassarchaeaceae" Rinke et al. 2019
  - "Candidatus Thalassarchaeum" corrig. Martin-Cuadrado et al. 2015

=== Class "Penumbrarchaeia" ===
==== Order "Penumbrarchaeales" ====
- Family "Penumbrarchaeaceae" Maeke et al. 2025
  - "Candidatus Penumbrarchaeum" Maeke et al. 2025

=== Class "Thermoplasmatia" ===
==== Order "Luniplasmatales" ====
- Family "Lunaplasmataceae" (sic) Zinke et al. 2021
  - ?"Candidatus Lunaplasma" (sic) Zinke et al. 2021

==== Order "Proteinoplasmatales" ====
- (SG8-5)

==== Order "Yaplasmatales" ====
- (RBG-16-68-12) [incl. "Detorarchales" Pallen & Alikhan 2021; "Limitiplasmatales" corrig. Zheng et al. 2022]

==== Order "Sysuiplasmatales" ====
- Family "Sysuiplasmataceae" Yuan et al. 2021
  - "Candidatus Sysuiplasma" Yuan et al. 2021

==== Order "Gimiplasmatales" ====
- Family "Gimiplasmataceae" Hu et al. 2020
  - "Candidatus Gimiplasma" Hu et al. 2020 (UA10834)

==== Order Methanomassiliicoccales ====
Phylogeny of Methanomassiliicoccales

- - Methanomassiliicoccaceae
    Methanomassiliicoccus
  - Methanomethylophilaceae
    - "Ca. Methanomicula"
    - - "Methanarcanum"
      - - "Methanoprimaticola"
        - - Methanomethylophilus
          - - "Methanogranum"
            - "Methanoplasma"

- Family "Methanomixtatrophicaceae" Hua et al. 2019
  - ?"Candidatus Methanomixtatrophicum" Hua et al. 2019
- Family Methanomassiliicoccaceae Iino et al. 2013
  - Methanomassiliicoccus Dridi et al. 2012
- Family Methanomethylophilaceae Gaci et al. 2014 ex Borrel et al. 2024
  - "Methanarcanum" Chibani et al. 2023
  - "Methanogranum" Iino et al. 2023
  - Methanomethylophilus Borrel et al. 2024
  - "Candidatus Methanomicula" Protasov & Brune 2023 ["Ca. Cribefarcha" Pallen, Rodriguez-R & Alikhan 2022]
  - "Methanoplasma" Lang & Brune 2023
  - "Methanoprimaticola" Chibani et al. 2023
  - ?"Candidatus Methanospyradousia" Gilroy et al. 2021

==== Order "Halarchaeoplasmatales" ====
Phylogeny of "Halarchaeoplasmatales"

- "Halarchaeoplasmataceae"
  - "Ca. Natronoplasma"
  - - "Ca. Saliniplasma"
    - - "Ca. Haladaptiplasma"
      - "Ca. Halarchaeoplasma"

- Family "Halarchaeoplasmataceae" Zhou et al. 2023 (PWKY01)
  - "Candidatus Haladaptiplasma" corrig. Zhou et al. 2022
  - "Candidatus Halarchaeoplasma" Zhou et al. 2023 ["Ca. Haloplasma" Zhou et al. 2022 non Antunes et al. 2008]
  - "Candidatus Natronoplasma" Zhou et al. 2022
  - "Candidatus Saliniplasma" Zhou et al. 2022

==== Order "Lutacidiplasmatales" ====
- Family "Lutacidiplasmataceae" Sheridan et al. 2022
  - "Candidatus Lutacidiplasma" Sheridan et al. 2022 (UBA184)

==== Order Thermoplasmatales ====
Phylogeny of Thermoplasmatales

- - "Aciduliprofundaceae"
    "Aciduliprofundum"
  - Thermoplasmataceae
    - Thermoplasma
    - - - Cuniculiplasma
        - Thermogymnomonas
      - - Picrophilus
        - - Acidiplasma
          - Ferroplasma

- Family "Aciduliprofundaceae" Rinke et al. 2020
  - "Aciduliprofundum" Reysenbach et al. 2006 (DHVE2 group)
- Family Thermoplasmataceae Reysenbach 2002
  - Acidiplasma Golyshina et al. 2009
  - ?Caldiplasma Tsukamoto et al. 2026
  - ?"Candidatus Carboxiplasma" Bulaev et al. 2023
  - Cuniculiplasma corrig. Golyshina et al. 2016
  - Ferroplasma Golyshina et al. 2000
  - ?Oxyplasma Golyshina et al. 2024
  - Picrophilus Schleper et al. 1996
  - ?"Candidatus Scheffleriplasma" Krause et al. 2022
  - Thermogymnomonas Itoh, Yoshikawa & Takashina 2007
  - Thermoplasma Darland et al. 1970

== Phylum Halobacteriota ==
Phylogeny of Halobacteriota

- - - Methanonatronarchaeia
      Methanonatronarchaeales
  - - - - "Methanoliparia"
          "Methanoliparales"
        - "Archaeoglobia"
          - "Mnemosynellales"
          - Archaeoglobales
      - - - Bog‑38
            "Methanoflorentales"
          - Methanocellia
            Methanocellales
        - - "Syntropharchaeia"
            - "Aerarchaeales"
            - - "Syntropharchaeales"
              - "Alkanophagales"
          - Methanosarcinia
            - - Methanosarcinales_A
              - Methanotrichales
            - Methanosarcinales
    - - "Methanomicrobia"
        Methanomicrobiales
      - Halobacteria
        Halobacteriales

=== Halobacteriota incertae sedis ===
- ?"Candidatus Methanoinsularis" Ou et al. 2022
- ?"Candidatus Methanoporticola" Ou et al. 2022

=== Class Methanonatronarchaeia ===
==== Order Methanonatronarchaeales ====
- Family Methanonatronarchaeaceae Sorokin et al. 2018
  - "Candidatus Methanohalarchaeum" Sorokin et al. 2018
  - Methanonatronarchaeum Sorokin et al. 2018

=== Class "Methanoliparia" ===
==== Order "Methanoliparales" ====
- Family "Methanoliparaceae" Borrel et al. 2019
  - "Candidatus Methanoliparum" Borrel et al. 2019
  - "Candidatus Methanolliviera" Borrel et al. 2019

=== Class "Archaeoglobia" ===
Phylogeny of "Archaeoglobia"

- - "Mnemosynellales"
    - "Mnemosynellaceae"
      "Ca. Mnemosynella"
  - Archaeoglobales
    - Archaeoglobaceae
      - - Archaeoglobus_A
        - Archaeoglobus_C
      - - Archaeoglobus_B
        - - - Ferroglobus
            - Geoglobus
          - Archaeoglobus

==== Order "Mnemosynellales" ====
- Family "Mnemosynellaceae" Adam et al. 2022
  - "Candidatus Mnemosynella" Adam et al. 2022

==== Order Archaeoglobales ====
- Family "Allopolytropaceae" corrig. Boyd et al. 2019
  - ?"Candidatus Allopolytropus" corrig. Boyd et al. 2019 ["Ca. Polytropus" Boyd et al. 2019 non Kirsch 1866]
- Family Archaeoglobaceae Huber & Stetter 2002
  - Archaeoglobus Stetter 1988
  - Ferroglobus Hafenbradl et al. 1997
  - Geoglobus Kashefi et al. 2002
  - ?"Candidatus Methanoglobus" Buessecker et al. 2023
  - ?"Candidatus Methanomixotrophus" corrig. Liu et al. 2021
  - ?"Candidatus Methanoproducendum" Hua et al. 2019

=== Class Bog-38 ===
==== Order "Methanoflorentales" ====
- Family "Methanoflorentaceae" Mondav et al. 2014
  - "Candidatus Methanoflorens" Mondav et al. 2014

=== Class Methanocellia ===
==== Order Methanocellales ====
Phylogeny of Methanocellales

- Methanocellaceae
  - - Methanooceanicella
    - Methanocella_A
  - Methanocella

- Family Methanocellaceae Sakai et al. 2008
  - Methanocella Sakai et al. 2008
  - Methanooceanicella Zhang et al. 2024

=== Class "Syntropharchaeia" ===
==== Order "Aerarchaeales" ====
- Family YL-1
  - "Candidatus Methanodefluvium" Leu et al. 2025
- Family "Aerarchaeaceae" Leu et al. 2025 [CG-2]
  - "Candidatus Aerarchaeum" Leu et al. 2025 (GG-2)
  - "Candidatus Aerovita" Leu et al. 2025 (CM-1, CG-1, MW-1)

==== Order "Syntropharchaeales" ====
- Family "Syntropharchaeaceae" (ANME-2 cluster)
  - "Candidatus Syntropharchaeum" corrig. Laso-Perez et al. 2016

==== Order "Alkanophagales" ====
Phylogeny of "Alkanophagales"

- - "Alkanophagaceae"
    "Ca. Alkanophaga"
  - "Methanospirantaceae"
    - "Ca. Methanophaga"
    - - "Ca. Methanospirare"
      - "Ca. Methanoxibalbensis"

- Family ?"Veteromethanophagaceae" Vulcano et al. 2022
- Family "Alkanophagaceae" [B39-G2]
  - "Candidatus Alkanophaga" Zehnle et al. 2023
- Family "Methanospirantaceae" corrig. Laso-Pérez et al. 2022
  - ?"Candidatus Methanoalium" Chadwick et al. 2022
  - "Candidatus Methanophaga" Chadwick et al. 2022
  - "Candidatus Methanospirans" corrig. Laso-Pérez et al. 2022
  - "Candidatus Methanoxibalbella" corrig. Laso-Pérez et al. 2022

==== Order Methanosarcinales_A ====
Family Methermicoccaceae Cheng et al. 2007

- Methermicoccus Cheng et al. 2007

=== Class Methanosarcinia ===
==== Order Methanotrichales ====
- Family Methanotrichaceae Akinyemi et al. 2021
  - "Candidatus Methanocrinis" Khomyakova et al. 2023
  - Methanothrix Huser, Wuhrmann & Zehnder 1983 [Methanosaeta Patel & Sprott 1990]

==== Order Methanosarcinales ====
Phylogeny of Methanosarcinales

- - - - "Methanocomedentaceae"
        - "Ca. Methanocomedens"
        - "Ca. Methanomarinus"
    - - "Ethanoperedentaceae"
        "Ca. Argarchaeum"
      - "Methanoperedentaceae"
        "Ca. Methanoperedens"
  - - "Methanogastraceae"
      "Ca. Methanogaster"
    - Methanosarcinaceae
      - - - "Methanofrustulum"
          - - Methanolapillus
            - Methanimicrococcus
        - Methanosarcina
      - - - Methanohalobium
          - Methanosalsum
        - - - Methanococcoides
            - Methanohalophilus
          - - Methanomethylovorans
            - Methanolobus

- Family "Methanocomedentaceae" corrig. Chadwick et al. 2022
  - ?"Candidatus Methanoborealis" Jetten et al. 2026 (ANME-2a)
  - "Candidatus Methanocomedens" Chadwick et al. 2022 (ANME-2a)
  - "Candidatus Methanomarinus" Chadwick et al. 2022 (ANME-2b)
- Family "Ethanoperedentaceae" (sic) Pallen, Rodriguez-R & Alikhan 2022 (EX4572-44)
  - "Ca. Argarchaeum" corrig. Chen et al. 2019 ["Candidatus Ethaniperedens" corrig. Hahn et al. 2020]
- Family "Methanoperedentaceae" corrig. Haroon et al. 2013
  - "Candidatus Methanoperedens" Haroon et al. 2013 (ANME-2d, AAA)
- Family "Methanogastraceae" corrig. Chadwick et al. 2022 (ANME-2c)
  - "Candidatus Methanogaster" Chadwick et al. 2022
- Family Methanosarcinaceae Balch & Wolfe 1981
  - ?Halomethanococcus Yu & Kawamura 1988
  - Methanimicrococcus corrig. Sprenger et al. 2000
  - Methanococcoides Sowers & Ferry 1985
  - "Methanofrustulum" Protasov & Brune 2023
  - Methanohalobium Zhilina & Zavarzin 1988
  - Methanohalophilus Paterek & Smith 1988
  - Methanolapillus Protasov & Brune 2025
  - Methanolobus König & Stetter 1983
  - Methanomethylovorans Lomans et al. 2004
  - Methanosalsum Boone & Baker 2002
  - Methanosarcina Kluyver & van Niel 1936
  - ?"Candidatus Methanovorans" Chadwick et al. 2022 (ANME-3)

=== Class "Methanomicrobia" ===
==== Order Methanomicrobiales ====
Phylogeny of Methanomicrobiales

- - - Methanofollaceae
      Methanofollis
  - - - Methanocorpusculaceae
        - Methanocorpusculum
        - Methanocalculus
    - - - Methanospirillaceae
          - Methanosphaerula
          - - Methanoregula
            - - Methanolinea
              - - "Methanofilum"
                - Methanospirillum
      - - Methanoculleaceae
          Methanoculleus
        - Methanomicrobiaceae
          - - Methanovulcanius
            - Methanogenium
          - - Methanoplanus
            - - Methanolacinia
              - - Methanochimaera
                - Methanomicrobium

- Family Methanofollaceae Chuvochina et al. 2024
  - Methanofollis Zellner et al. 1999
- Family Methanocorpusculaceae Zellner et al. 1989
  - Methanocalculus Ollivier et al. 1998
  - Methanocorpusculum Zellner et al. 1988 ["Methanorbis" Protasov & Brune 2023]
- Family Methanospirillaceae Boone et al. 2002
  - "Methanofilum" Protasov & Brune 2023
  - Methanolinea Imachi et al. 2008
  - Methanoregula Brauer et al. 2011
  - Methanosphaerula Cadillo-Quiroz et al. 2009
  - Methanospirillum Ferry, Smith & Wolfe 1974
- Family Methanoculleaceae Chuvochina et al. 2024
  - Methanoculleus Maestrojun et al. 1990
- Family Methanomicrobiaceae Balch & Wolfe 1981
  - Methanochimaera Zhou et al. 2024
  - Methanogenium Romesser et al. 1981
  - Methanolacinia Zellner et al. 1990
  - Methanomicrobium Balch & Wolfe 1981 [Methanoeremita Zhou et al. 2024]
  - Methanoplanus Wildgruber et al. 1984
  - Methanovulcanius Chien et al. 2023

=== Class "Ordosarchaeia" ===
==== Order "Ordosarchaeales" ====
- Family "Ordosarchaeaceae" Zhao et al. 2024
  - ?"Candidatus Ordosarchaeum" Zhao et al. 2024

=== Class Halobacteria ===
==== Order Halobacteriales ====
Phylogeny of Halobacteriales

- - - "Afararchaeaceae"
      "Ca. Afararchaeum"
    - Halorutilaceae
      Halorutilus
  - - - "Hikarchaeaceae"
        - "Ca. Chewarchaeum"
        - "Ca. Hikarchaeum"
    - - - "Salinarchaeaceae"
          Salinarchaeum
      - - - Halalkalicoccaceae
            - Natronorarus
            - Halalkalicoccus
        - - - Haladaptataceae
              - - Halomicrococcus
                - Haladaptatus
              - Halorussus
            - Halobacteriaceae
              - - Halanaeroarchaeum
                - Halodesulfurarchaeum
              - - - - Halospeciosus
                    - Salarchaeum
                  - - Halocalculus
                    - Halarchaeum
                - Halobacterium
          - - - - Natronoarchaeaceae
                  - Halostella
                  - - Natranaeroarchaeum
                    - Natronoarchaeum
              - Natrialbaceae cont'd
            - - - Halococcaceae
                  Halococcus
                - Haloarculaceae
                  - - - Halocatena
                      - Halomarina
                    - - Natronomonas
                      - - - Halorarius
                          - Halosegnis
                        - - Salinirubellus
                          - Haloglomus
                  - - Halorientalis
                    - - - Halococcoides
                        - - Halapricum
                          - Halorhabdus
                      - - - - Salinirussus
                            - - Salinibaculum
                              - Halovenus
                          - Halosimplex
                        - - Halomicrobium
                          - Haloarcula
              - Haloferacaceae cont'd

- ?"Haloalcalophilium" Lizama et al. 2000a
- Family "Abyssiniarchaeaceae" Gutiérrez-Preciado et al. 2024
  - ?"Candidatus Abyssiniarchaeum" Gutiérrez-Preciado et al. 2024 (DAL-8mg-83m_91C4R)
- Family "Halolitoreaceae" Hou et al. 2024
  - ?"Halolitoreus" Hou et al. 2026
- Family "Karumarchaeaceae" Gutiérrez-Preciado et al. 2024
  - ?"Candidatus Karumarchaeum" Gutiérrez-Preciado et al. 2024 (DAL-8mg-83m_91C4R)
- Family "Afararchaeaceae" Baker et al. 2024
  - "Candidatus Afararchaeum" Baker et al. 2024
- Family Halorutilaceae Durán-Viseras et al. 2023
  - Halorutilus Durán-Viseras et al. 2023
- Family "Hikarchaeaceae" Martijn et al. 2020 (MG-IV)
  - "Candidatus Chewarchaeum" Baker et al. 2024
  - "Candidatus Hikarchaeum" Martijn et al. 2020
- Family "Salinarchaeaceae"
  - Salinarchaeum Cui et al. 2014
- Family Halalkalicoccaceae Mao et al. 2025
  - Halalkalicoccus Xue et al. 2005
  - Natronorarus Mao et al. 2025
- Family Haladaptataceae Rinke et al. 2020
  - Haladaptatus Savage et al. 2007
  - Halomicrococcus Chen et al. 2020
  - Halorussus Cui et al. 2014
- Family Halobacteriaceae
  - Halanaeroarchaeum Sorokin et al. 2016
  - Halarchaeum Minegishi et al. 2010
  - Halobacterium (Elazari-Volcani 1940) Elazari-Volcani 1957 ["Halobacter" Anderson 1954]
  - Halocalculus Minegishi et al. 2015
  - Halodesulfurarchaeum Sorokin et al. 2017
  - Halospeciosus Li et al. 2024
  - Salarchaeum Shimane et al. 2011
- Family Natronoarchaeaceae Sorokin et al. 2023
  - Halostella Song et al. 2016
  - Natranaeroarchaeum Sorokin et al. 2023
  - Natronoarchaeum Shimane et al. 2010

Phylogeny of Natrialbaceae

- - - Halorubellus
    - Haloarchaeobius
  - - Halovivax
    - - Natronobeatus
      - - Natribaculum
        - - - - - Natronobiforma
                - Saliphagus
              - Halomontanus
            - - Natrononativus
              - Natronosalvus
          - - Salinilacihabitans
            - - Halovalidus
              - - Halostagnicola
                - - Natronococcus
                  - - - - Halopiger_A
                        - Natrarchaeobaculum
                      - - Halopiger_B
                        - Halosolutus
                    - - - Natrarchaeobius
                        - - Salinadaptatus
                          - Natrialba
                      - - - - Natronolimnobius
                            - Halopiger
                          - Natronobacterium
                        - - - - Natronolimnohabitans
                              - Haloterrigena
                            - Natronorubrum
                          - Natrinema

- Family Natrialbaceae Gupta et al. 2015
  - Haloarchaeobius Makhdoumi-Kakhki et al. 2012
  - Halomontanus Mao et al. 2024 [Natronoglomus Sorokin et al. 2025]
  - Halopiger Gutierrez et al. 2007
  - Halorubellus Cui et al. 2014
  - Halosolutus Sun et al. 2022
  - Halostagnicola Castillo et al. 2006
  - Haloterrigena Ventosa et al. 1999
  - Halovalidus Dong et al. 2025
  - Halovivax Castillo et al. 2006
  - Natrarchaeobaculum Sorokin et al. 2020
  - Natrarchaeobius corrig. Sorokin et al. 2020
  - Natrialba Kamekura & Dyall-Smith 1996
  - Natribaculum Liu et al. 2015 [Halovarius Mehrshad et al. 2015]
  - Natronobacterium Tindall et al. 1984 [Halobiforma Hezayen et al. 2002]
  - Natronobiforma Sorokin et al. 2019
  - Natronococcus Tindall et al. 1984
  - Natronolimnobius Itoh et al. 2005
  - Natronolimnohabitans Sorokin et al. 2020
  - Natrinema McGenity et al. 1998
  - Natronobeatus Li et al. 2023
  - Natrononativus Li et al. 2023
  - Natronorubrum Xu et al. 1999
  - Natronosalvus Tan et al. 2023
  - Salinadaptatus Xue et al. 2020
  - Salinilacihabitans Li et al. 2023
  - Saliphagus Yin et al. 2017
- Family Halococcaceae Gupta et al. 2016
  - Halococcus Schoop 1935
- Family Haloarculaceae
  - Halapricum Song et al. 2014 ["Halarchaeoglobus" Sorokin et al. 2021]
  - Haloarcula Torreblanca et al. 1986 [Halomicroarcula Echigo et al. 2013]
  - Halocatena Verma et al. 2020 [Actinarchaeum corrig. Tang et al. 2024]
  - Halococcoides Sorokin et al. 2019
  - Haloglomus Duran-Viseras, Sanchez-Porro & Ventosa 2020
  - Halomarina Inoue et al. 2011
  - Halomicroarcula Echigo et al. 2013
  - Halomicrobium Oren et al. 2002 [Halosiccatus Mehrshad et al. 2016]
  - Halorientalis Cui et al. 2011
  - Halorarius Sun et al. 2023
  - Halorhabdus Waino et al. 2000
  - Halosegnis Duran-Viseras et al. 2022 [Sala Song et al. 2023 non Ross 1937 non Walker 1867; Salella Deshmukh & Oren 2023]
  - Halosimplex Vreeland et al. 2003
  - Halovenus Makhdoumi-Kakhki et al. 2012
  - Natronomonas Kamekura et al. 1997
  - Salinibaculum Han & Cui 2020
  - Salinirubellus Hou et al. 2018
  - Salinirussus Cui et al. 2017

Phylogeny of Haloferacaceae

- - Salinirubrum
  - - - - Haloplanus
        - Salinirarus
      - - - Haloprofundus
          - - Halegenticoccus
            - - Halobium
              - Halogranum
        - - Salinigranum
          - - Haloferax
            - - Halopelagius
              - - Halogeometricum
                - Haloquadratum
    - - - Halolamina
        - - "Ca. Halobonum"
          - - Halorarum
            - Halobaculum
      - - - - Halalkalirubrum
            - Natronocalculus
          - - Halohasta
            - Halonotius
        - - Halalkaliarchaeum
          - - Halopenitus
            - - Haloparvum
              - Halorubrum

- Family Haloferacaceae Gupta et al. 2015
  - Halalkaliarchaeum Sorokin et al. 2019
  - Halalkalirubrum Zuo et al. 2021
  - ?"Candidatus Halectosymbiota" corrig. Filker et al. 2014
  - Halegenticoccus Liu et al. 2022
  - Halobaculum Oren et al. 1995
  - Halobium Mori et al. 2016
  - "Candidatus Halobonum" Ugalde et al. 2013
  - Haloferax Torreblanca et al. 1986
  - Halogeometricum Montalvo-Rodriguez et al. 1998 [Halosarcina Savage et al. 2008]
  - Halogranum Cui et al. 2010
  - Halohasta Mou et al. 2013
  - Halolamina Cui et al. 2011
  - Halonotius Burns et al. 2010
  - ?"Halonovum" Hwang et al. 2025
  - Haloparvum Chen et al. 2016
  - Halopelagius Cui et al. 2010
  - Halopenitus Amoozegar et al. 2012
  - Haloplanus Elevi Bardavid et al. 2007
  - Haloprofundus Zhang et al. 2017
  - Haloquadratum Burns et al. 2007 [Halobellus Cui et al. 2011]
  - Halorubrum McGenity & Grant 1996 [Halorubrobacterium Kamekura & Dyall-Smith 1996]
  - ?Halosubterraneus Ding et al. 2026
  - ?Halotolerantifilum Fisher et al. 2026
  - Natronocalculus Sorokin et al. 2023
  - Salinigranum Cui & Zhang 2014
  - Salinirarus Zhang et al. 2025
  - Salinirubrum corrig. Cui & Qiu 2014

== See also ==
- Branching order of bacterial phyla (Woese, 1987)
- Branching order of bacterial phyla (Gupta, 2001)
- Branching order of bacterial phyla (Cavalier-Smith, 2002)
- Branching order of bacterial phyla (Rappe and Giovanoni, 2003)
- Branching order of bacterial phyla (Battistuzzi et al., 2004)
- Branching order of bacterial phyla (Ciccarelli et al., 2006)
- Branching order of bacterial phyla after ARB Silva Living Tree
- Branching order of bacterial phyla (Genome Taxonomy Database, 2018)
- Bacterial phyla
- List of bacteria genera
- List of bacterial orders
