= Halostella =

Scientific classification
- Domain: Archaea
- Kingdom: Methanobacteriati
- Phylum: Methanobacteriota
- Class: Halobacteria
- Order: Halobacteriales
- Family: Halobacteriaceae
- Genus: Halostella; Song et al. 2016

Type species
- Halostella salina Song et al. 2016

Species
- H. limicola; H. litorea; H. pelagica; H. salina

Genus of archaea

Halostella (common abbreviation Hsl.) is a genus of halophilic archaea in the family Halobacteriaceae.

== Phylogeny ==
The currently accepted taxonomy is based on the List of Prokaryotic names with Standing in Nomenclature (LPSN) and National Center for Biotechnology Information (NCBI).

16S rRNA based LTP_07_2026

- Halostella
  - H. limicola
  - - H. pelagica
    - - H. litorea
      - H. salina

53 marker proteins based GTDB 11-RS232

- Halostella
  - - H. limicola Han et al. 2019
    - H. pelagica Han & Cui 2020
  - - H. litorea Han & Cui 2020
    - H. salina Song et al. 2016

== See also ==
- List of Archaea genera
