= Haloarchaeobius =

Scientific classification
- Domain: Archaea
- Kingdom: Methanobacteriati
- Phylum: Methanobacteriota
- Class: Halobacteria
- Order: Halobacteriales
- Family: Halobacteriaceae
- Genus: Haloarchaeobius; Makhdoumi-Kakhki et al. 2012

Type species
- Haloarchaeobius iranensis Makhdoumi-Kakhki et al. 2012

Species
- H. amylolyticus; H. baliensis; "H. caseinilyticus"; H. iranensis; "H. lipolyticus"; H. litoreus; "H. marinus"; "H. ordinarius"; "H. pelagicus"; H. salinus

Genus of archaea

Haloarchaeobius (common abbreviation Hab.) is a genus of halophilic archaea in the family Halobacteriaceae.

== Phylogeny ==
The currently accepted taxonomy is based on the List of Prokaryotic names with Standing in Nomenclature (LPSN) and National Center for Biotechnology Information (NCBI).

16S rRNA based LTP_07_2026

- Haloarchaeobius
  - - H. amylolyticus Yuan et al. 2015
    - H. baliensis Mori et al. 2016
  - - H. iranensis Makhdoumi-Kakhki et al. 2012
    - - H. litoreus Zhang & Cui 2014
      - H. salinus Yuan et al. 2015

53 marker proteins based GTDB 11-RS232

- Haloarchaeobius
  - H. amylolyticus
  - - H. iranensis
    - - H. baliensis
      - - H. litoreus
        - H. salinus

== See also ==
- List of Archaea genera
