= Halosarcina =

Scientific classification
- Domain: Archaea
- Kingdom: Methanobacteriati
- Phylum: Methanobacteriota
- Class: Halobacteria
- Order: Halobacteriales
- Family: Haloarculaceae
- Genus: Halosarcina; Savage et al. 2008

Type species
- Halosarcina pallida Savage et al. 2008

Species
- H. pallida

Synonyms
- Halogeometricum pallidum (Savage et al. 2008) Qiu et al. 2013; "Halosarcina vepailidus"

Genus of archaea

Halosarcina is a genus of archaeans in the family Halobacteriaceae.

== See also ==
- List of Archaea genera
