= Halalkalicoccus =

Scientific classification
- Domain: Archaea
- Kingdom: Methanobacteriati
- Phylum: Methanobacteriota
- Class: Halobacteria
- Order: Halobacteriales
- Family: Halobacteriaceae
- Genus: Halalkalicoccus; Xue et al. 2005

Type species
- Halalkalicoccus tibetensis Xue et al. 2005

Species
- H. jeotgali; H. paucihalophilus; H. ordinarius; H. salilacus; H. subterraneus; H. tibetensis

Genus of archaea

Halalkalicoccus (common abbreviation Hac.) is a genus of archaeans in the family Halobacteriaceae.

== Phylogeny ==
The currently accepted taxonomy is based on the List of Prokaryotic names with Standing in Nomenclature (LPSN) and National Center for Biotechnology Information (NCBI).

16S rRNA based LTP_07_2026

- Halalkalicoccus
  - - H. ordinarius Mao et al. 2025
    - H. salilacus Mao et al. 2025
  - - H. jeotgali Roh et al. 2007
    - - H. subterraneus Chen et al. 2020
      - - H. paucihalophilus Liu et al. 2013
        - H. tibetensis Xue et al. 2005

53 marker proteins based GTDB 11-RS232

- Halalkalicoccus
  - - H. ordinarius
    - H. salilacus
  - - H. tibetensis
    - - H. paucihalophilus
      - - H. jeotgali
        - H. subterraneus

== See also ==
- List of Archaea genera
