= Halosimplex =

Scientific classification
- Domain: Archaea
- Kingdom: Methanobacteriati
- Phylum: Methanobacteriota
- Class: Halobacteria
- Order: Halobacteriales
- Family: Haloarculaceae
- Genus: Halosimplex; Vreeland et al. 2003

Type species
- Halosimplex carlsbadense Vreeland et al. 2003

Species
- See text

Genus of archaea

Halosimplex is a genus of archaeans in the family Halobacteriaceae.

== Phylogeny ==
The currently accepted taxonomy is based on the List of Prokaryotic names with Standing in Nomenclature (LPSN) and National Center for Biotechnology Information (NCBI).

16S rRNA based LTP_07_2026

- Halosimplex 2
  - H. litoreum
  - - H. aquaticum
    - H. salinum

- Halosimplex
  - H. halophilum
  - - H. rubrum
    - - H. carlsbadense
      - H. pelagicum

53 marker proteins based GTDB 11-RS232

- Halosimplex
  - - H. salinum Yang et al. 2021
    - - H. amylolyticum Mao et al. 2025
      - - H. aquaticum Hu et al. 2024
        - H. rarum Mao et al. 2025
  - - - H. marinum Mao et al. 2025
      - - H. halobium Mao et al. 2025
        - H. halophilum Yang et al. 2021
    - - H. pelagicum Han & Cui 2014
      - - H. rubrum Han & Cui 2014
        - - H. carlsbadense Vreeland et al. 2003
          - H. litoreum Yuan et al. 2015

== See also ==
- List of Archaea genera
