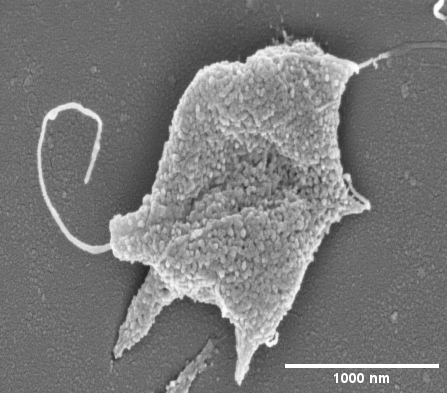
- SEM image of Haloarcula quadrata.

Scientific classification
- Domain: Archaea
- Kingdom: Methanobacteriati
- Phylum: Methanobacteriota
- Class: Halobacteria
- Order: Halobacteriales
- Family: Haloarculaceae
- Genus: Haloarcula; Torreblanca et al. 1986 emend. Ma et al. 2024

Type species
- Haloarcula vallismortis (Gonzalez, Gutierrez & Ramirez 1979) Torreblanca et al. 1986

Species
- See text

Synonyms
- Halomicroarcula Echigo et al. 2013

= Haloarcula =

Genus of archaea

Haloarcula (common abbreviation Har.) is a genus of extreme halophilic Archaea in the class of Halobacteria.

== Cell structure ==
Haloarcula species can be distinguished from other genera in the family Halobacteriaceae by the presence of specific derivatives of TGD-2 polar lipids. H. quadrata has predominantly flat, square-shaped, somewhat pleomorphic cells.

== Metabolism ==
Haloarcula quadrata was first isolated when researchers were attempting to culture Haloquadratum walsbyi, a haloarchaeon that was thought to be unculturable until 2004. Similar to other halophilic archaea, Haloarcula species grow optimally at 40–45 °C. Growth appears in sheets of up to 65 cells often in the shape of a square or triangle.

== Taxonomy ==
The genus of Haloarcula was long grouped with other halophilic archaea such as Halobacterium until genomic analysis prompted to reorder this genus in the new family of Haloarculaceae.

=== Phylogeny ===
The currently accepted taxonomy is based on the List of Prokaryotic names with Standing in Nomenclature (LPSN) and National Center for Biotechnology Information (NCBI).

16S rRNA based LTP_07_2026

- Haloarcula
  - - - H. rara
      - H. salinisoli
    - - H. laminariae
      - H. sediminis
  - - - H. amylovorans
      - - H.limicola
        - H. nitratireducens
    - - H. salina
      - - - - H. mannanilytica
            - H. terrestris
          - - H. sebkhae
            - H. tradensis
        - - H. salaria
          - - - H. amylolytica
              - H. japonica
            - - H. brevis
              - - H. hispanica
                - - H. argentinensis
                  - - H. quadrata Oren et al. 1999
                    - - H. marismortui
                      - H. vallismortis

- - Haloarcula~1
    - H. litorea
    - - H. halophila
      - H. pelagica
  - Halomicroarcula
    - H. pellucida Echigo et al. 2013
    - - - H. marina Ma et al. 2023
        - H. rubra Durán-Viseras, Sánchez-Porro & Ventosa 2022
      - - - Haloarcula ordinaria
          - - Haloarcula halobia
            - Haloarcula regularis
        - - H. laminariae Ma et al. 2023
          - - H. onubensis Straková et al. 2024
            - H. saliterrae Straková et al. 2024

53 marker proteins based GTDB 11-RS232

- Haloarcula
  - H. litorea Ma et al. 2024
  - - - H. amylovorans Ma et al. 2024
      - H. limicola (Zhang & Cui 2014) Ma et al. 2024
    - - - H. marina (Ma et al. 2023) Ma et al. 2024
        - - H. pellucida (Echigo et al. 2013) Ma et al. 2024
          - H. rubra (Durán-Viseras, Sánchez-Porro & Ventosa 2022) Ma et al. 2024
      - - - H. onubensis (Straková et al. 2024) Straková et al. 2024
          - - H. saliterrae (Straková et al. 2024) Straková et al. 2024
            - - - H. laminariae (Ma et al. 2023) Ma et al. 2024
                - H. sediminis Ma et al. 2025
              - - H. rara Ma et al. 2024
                - H. salinisoli (Durán-Viseras, Sánchez-Porro & Ventosa) Ma et al. 2024
        - - - H. pelagica Ma et al. 2024
            - - H. halophila Ma et al. 2024
              - "H. montana" Liu et al. 2025
          - - - H. ordinaria Ma et al. 2024
              - - H. halobia Ma et al. 2024
                - H. regularis Ma et al. 2025
            - - H. salina (Zhang & Cui 2015) Ma et al. 2023
              - - H. brevis Ma et al. 2025
                - - - "H. rubripromontorii" Sanchez-Nieves et al. 2016
                    - "H. taiwanensis" Chen et al. 2018
                  - - - - H. amylolytica Yang et al. 2007
                        - H. hispanica Juez et al. 1986
                      - - H. mannanilytica Enomoto et al. 2020
                        - H. terrestris Straková et al. 2023
                    - - H. vallismortis (Gonzalez, Gutierrez & Ramirez 1979) Torreblanca et al. 1986
                      - - H. marismortui Elazari-Volcani 1940 ex Oren et al. 1990
                          [H. quadrata]
                        - - H. japonica Takashina et al. 1991
                          - - H. argentinensis Ihara et al. 1997
                            - H. sebkhae Barreteau et al. 2019

Unassigned Haloarcula

- "H. ajinwuensis"
- "H. algeriensis" Kharroub et al. 2005b
- "H. altuensis"
- "H. morrhuae" Torreblanca et al. 1986
- "H. siamensis" Namwong et al. 2007

== Ecology ==
Haloarcula species are found in neutral saline environments such as salt lakes, marine salterns, and saline soils. Like other members of the family Halobacteriaceae, Haloarcula requires at least 1.5 M NaCl for growth, but grow optimally in 2.0 to 4.5 M NaCl.

== See also ==
- List of Archaea genera
