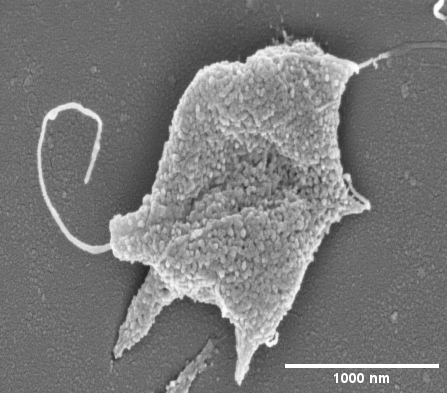
- SEM image of Haloarcula quadrata.

Scientific classification
- Domain: Archaea
- Kingdom: Methanobacteriati
- Phylum: Methanobacteriota
- Class: Halobacteria
- Order: Halobacteriales
- Family: Haloarculaceae
- Genus: Haloarcula
- Species: H. quadrata

Binomial name
- Haloarcula quadrata Oren et al. 1999

= Haloarcula quadrata =

Species of archaeon

Haloarcula quadrata is a species of archaea discovered in a brine pool in the Sinai Peninsula of Egypt. It was one of the first strains of prokaryotes whose cells show a flat, box-like shape.

They were categorized as Haloarcula on the basis of their polar lipid composition.

== Morphology and metabolism ==
The cells move using single or multiple flagella but lack gas vacuoles. Species within the genus Haloarcula are Gram negative and extremely halophilic, and they can use any of several sources of carbon.
