= Haloalcalophilium =

Scientific classification
- Domain: Archaea
- Kingdom: Methanobacteriati
- Phylum: Methanobacteriota
- Class: Halobacteria
- Order: Halobacteriales
- Family: Halobacteriaceae
- Genus: Haloalcalophilium; Lizama et al. 2000a

Type species
- "Haloalcalophilium atacamensis" Lizama et al. 2000a

Species
- "H. atacamensis"

Genus of archaea

Haloalcalophilium is a genus of archaeans in the family Halobacteriaceae.

== See also ==
- List of Archaea genera
