= Halogeometricum =

Scientific classification
- Domain: Archaea
- Kingdom: Methanobacteriati
- Phylum: Methanobacteriota
- Class: Halobacteria
- Order: Haloferacales
- Family: Haloferacaceae
- Genus: Halogeometricum; Montalvo-Rodrguez et al. 1998

Type species
- Halogeometricum borinquense Montalvo-Rodriguez et al. 1998

Species
- H. borinquense; H. limi; H. luteum; H. pallidum; H. rufum; H. salsisoli

Synonyms
- Halosarcina Savage et al. 2008

Genus of archaea

Halogeometricum is a genus of archaeans in the family Haloferacaceae.

== Phylogeny ==
The currently accepted taxonomy is based on the List of Prokaryotic names with Standing in Nomenclature (LPSN) and National Center for Biotechnology Information (NCBI).

16S rRNA based LTP_07_2026

- Halogeometricum
  - H. limi (Cui et al. 2010) Qiu et al. 2013
  - - - H. borinquense Montalvo-Rodriguez et al. 1998
      - H. rufum Cui et al. 2010
    - - H. pallidum (Savage et al. 2008) Qiu et al. 2013
      - - H. luteum Straková et al. 2025
        - H. salsisoli Straková et al. 2025

53 marker proteins based GTDB 11-RS232

- Halogeometricum
  - - H. borinquense
    - H. rufum
  - - H. limi
    - - H. pallidum
      - - H. luteum
        - H. salsisoli

== See also ==
- List of Archaea genera
