= Natronorubrum =

Scientific classification
- Domain: Archaea
- Kingdom: Methanobacteriati
- Phylum: Methanobacteriota
- Class: Halobacteria
- Order: Halobacteriales
- Family: Halobacteriaceae
- Genus: Natronorubrum; Xu et al. 1999

Type species
- Natronorubrum bangense Xu et al. 1999

Species
- See text

Genus of archaea

Natronorubrum is a genus of archaeans in the family Halobacteriaceae.

== Phylogeny ==
The currently accepted taxonomy is based on the List of Prokaryotic names with Standing in Nomenclature (LPSN) and National Center for Biotechnology Information (NCBI).

16S rRNA based LTP_07_2026

- Natronorubrum
  - - N. daqingensis (Wang et al. 2010) Rinke et al. 2020 ex de la Haba et al. 2022
    - - N. halobium Mao et al. 2026
      - - Natronococcus roseus
        - N. sediminis Gutierrez et al.
  - - N. halophilum Tao et al. 2020
    - - N. sulfidifaciens Cui et al. 2007
      - - - N. aibiense Cui et al. 2006
          - N. bangense Xu et al. 1999
        - - N. salinum Mao et al. 2026
          - - - N. amylolyticum Mao et al. 2026
              - "N. marinum" Mao et al. 2026
            - - N. texcoconense Ruiz-Romero et al. 2013
              - N. tibetense Xu et al. 1999

53 marker proteins based GTDB 11-RS232

- Natronorubrum
  - - N. aibiense
    - - N. sulfidifaciens
      - - N. bangense
        - "N. thiooxidans" Sorokin et al. 2005
  - - - "N. halalkaliphilum" Xue et al. 2021
      - N. halophilum
    - - - N. texcoconense
        - N. tibetense
      - - N. daqingensis
        - N. sediminis

== See also ==
- List of Archaea genera
