= Halonotius =

Scientific classification
- Domain: Archaea
- Kingdom: Methanobacteriati
- Phylum: Methanobacteriota
- Class: Halobacteria
- Order: Haloferacales
- Family: Haloferacaceae
- Genus: Halonotius; Burns et al. 2010

Type species
- Halonotius pteroides Burns et al. 2010

Species
- H. aquaticus; H. pteroides; H. roseus; H. terrestris

Genus of archaea

Halonotius (common abbreviation Hns.) is a genus of halophilic archaea in the family of Halorubraceae.

== Phylogeny ==
The currently accepted taxonomy is based on the List of Prokaryotic names with Standing in Nomenclature (LPSN) and National Center for Biotechnology Information (NCBI).

16S rRNA based LTP_07_2026

- Halonotius
  - H. terrestris Durán-Viseras et al. 2020
  - - H. pteroides Burns et al. 2010
    - - H. aquaticus Duran-Viseras, Ventosa & Sanchez-Porro 2019
      - H. roseus Durán-Viseras et al. 2020

53 marker proteins based GTDB 11-RS232

- Halonotius
  - H. terrestris
  - - H. roseus
    - - H. aquaticus
      - H. pteroides

== See also ==
- List of Archaea genera
