= Halomicrobium =

Scientific classification
- Domain: Archaea
- Kingdom: Methanobacteriati
- Phylum: Methanobacteriota
- Class: Halobacteria
- Order: Halobacteriales
- Family: Haloarculaceae
- Genus: Halomicrobium; Oren et al. 2002

Type species
- Halomicrobium mukohataei (Ihara et al. 1997) Oren et al. 2002

Species
- H. katesii; H. mukohataei; H. salinisoli; H. urmianus; H. zhouii

Synonyms
- Halosiccatus Mehrshad et al. 2016

Genus of archaea

Halomicrobium is a genus of archaeans in the family Haloarculaceae.

== Phylogeny ==
The currently accepted taxonomy is based on the List of Prokaryotic names with Standing in Nomenclature (LPSN) and National Center for Biotechnology Information (NCBI).

16S rRNA based LTP_07_2026

- Halomicrobium
  - Halomicrobium zhouii
  - - Halomicrobium mukohataei
    - Haloarcula~1 [incl. Halomicroarcula]

- Halomicrobium 2
  - H. salinisoli
  - H. urmianus

53 marker proteins based GTDB 11-RS232

- - - Halomicrobium
      - - H. salinisoli Xin et al. 2022
        - H. urmianus (Mehrshad et al. 2016) Xin et al. 2022
      - - H. zhouii Yang & Cui 2011
        - - H. katesii Kharroub et al. 2008
          - H. mukohataei (Ihara et al. 1997) Oren et al. 2002
  - Haloarcula [incl. Halomicroarcula]

== See also ==
- List of Archaea genera
