= Salinirubrum litoreum =

Scientific classification
- Domain: Archaea
- Kingdom: Methanobacteriati
- Phylum: Methanobacteriota
- Class: Halobacteria
- Order: Halobacteriales
- Family: Halobacteriaceae
- Genus: Salinirubrum
- Species: S. litoreum

Binomial name
- Salinirubrum litoreum corrig. Cui and Qiu 2014

Synonyms
- Salinarubrum (spelling variant); Salinarubrum litoreum (spelling variant)

Genus of archaea

Salinirubrum litoreum is a halophilic archaeon in the family of Halobacteriaceae and the only described species in the genus Salinirubrum (common abbreviation Srr.).
