= Halarchaeum =

Scientific classification
- Domain: Archaea
- Kingdom: Methanobacteriati
- Phylum: Methanobacteriota
- Class: Halobacteria
- Order: Halobacteriales
- Family: Halobacteriaceae
- Genus: Halarchaeum; Minegishi et al. 2010

Type species
- Halarchaeum acidiphilum Minegishi et al. 2010

Species
- H. acidiphilum; H. grantii; H. nitratireducens; H. rubridurum; H. salinum; H. solikamskense

Synonyms
- "Haloarchaeum" (sic) DasSarma & DasSarma 2008

Genus of archaea

Halarchaeum (common abbreviation Hla.) is a genus of halophilic archaea in the family Halobacteriaceae.

== Phylogeny ==
The currently accepted taxonomy is based on the List of Prokaryotic names with Standing in Nomenclature (LPSN) and National Center for Biotechnology Information (NCBI).

16S rRNA based LTP_07_2026

- Halarchaeum
  - H. grantii Shimane et al. 2015
  - - - H. acidiphilum Minegishi et al. 2010
      - H. salinum Yamauchi et al. 2013
    - - H. rubridurum Yamauchi et al. 2013
      - - H. nitratireducens Minegishi et al. 2013
        - H. solikamskense Saralov et al. 2014

53 marker proteins based GTDB 11-RS232

- Halarchaeum
  - H. grantii
  - - H. salinum
    - - H. rubridurum
      - - H. acidiphilum
        - H. nitratireducens

== See also ==
- List of Archaea genera
