= Halapricum =

Scientific classification
- Domain: Archaea
- Kingdom: Methanobacteriati
- Phylum: Methanobacteriota
- Class: Halobacteria
- Order: Halobacteriales
- Family: Haloarculaceae
- Genus: Halapricum; Song et al. 2014

Type species
- Halapricum salinum Song et al. 2014

Species
- H. desulfuricans; H. hydrolyticum; H. salinum

Synonyms
- "Halarchaeoglobus" Sorokin et al. 2021

Genus of archaea

Halapricum (common abbreviation Hpr.) is a genus of halophilic archaea in the family Haloarculaceae.

== Phylogeny ==
The currently accepted taxonomy is based on the List of Prokaryotic names with Standing in Nomenclature (LPSN) and National Center for Biotechnology Information (NCBI).

16S rRNA based LTP_07_2026

- Halapricum
  - H. salinum Song et al. 2014
  - - H. desulfuricans Sorokin et al. 2022
    - H. hydrolyticum Sorokin et al. 2025

53 marker proteins based GTDB 11-RS232

- Halapricum
  - H. salinum
  - - H. desulfuricans
    - H. hydrolyticum

== See also ==
- List of Archaea genera
