= Halorientalis =

Scientific classification
- Domain: Archaea
- Kingdom: Methanobacteriati
- Phylum: Methanobacteriota
- Class: Halobacteria
- Order: Halobacteriales
- Family: Haloarculaceae
- Genus: Halorientalis; Cui et al. 2011

Type species
- Halorientalis regularis Cui et al. 2011

Species
- H. brevis; "H. halophila"; "H. hydrocarbonoclasticus"; H. litorea; H. marina; H. pallida; H. persica; H. regularis; H. salina

Genus of archaea

Halorientalis is a genus of archaeans in the family Haloarculaceae.

== Phylogeny ==
The currently accepted taxonomy is based on the List of Prokaryotic names with Standing in Nomenclature (LPSN) and National Center for Biotechnology Information (NCBI).

16S rRNA based LTP_07_2026

- Halorientalis
  - H. marina
  - - - H. brevis
      - H. salina
    - - H. litorea
      - - H. pallida
        - - H. persica
          - H. regularis

53 marker proteins based GTDB 11-RS232

- Halorientalis
  - H. marina Wang et al. 2023
  - - - H. brevis Yuan et al. 2015
      - H. salina Wang et al. 2023
    - - H. litorea Wang et al. 2023
      - - H. halophila Cui et al. 2025
        - - H. persica corrig. Amoozegar et al. 2014
          - - H. pallida Duran-Viseras, Sanchez-Porro & Ventosa 2019
            - H. regularis Cui et al. 2011

== See also ==
- List of Archaea genera
