= Halomarina =

Scientific classification
- Domain: Archaea
- Kingdom: Methanobacteriati
- Phylum: Methanobacteriota
- Class: Halobacteria
- Order: Halobacteriales
- Family: Halobacteriaceae
- Genus: Halomarina; Inoue et al. 2011

Type species
- Halomarina oriensis Inoue et al. 2011

Species
- N. halobia; N. litorea; N. ordinaria; H. oriensis; N. pelagica; H. rubra; H. salina

Genus of archaea

Halomarina (common abbreviation Hmr.) is a genus of halophilic archaea in the family Halobacteriaceae.

== Phylogeny ==
The currently accepted taxonomy is based on the List of Prokaryotic names with Standing in Nomenclature (LPSN) and National Center for Biotechnology Information (NCBI).

16S rRNA based LTP_07_2026

- Halomarina
  - H. rubra
  - - H. oriensis
    - H. salina

53 marker proteins based GTDB 11-RS232

- Halomarina
  - - H. ordinaria Cheng et al. 2024
    - - H. halobia Cheng et al. 2024
      - H. pelagica Cheng et al. 2024
  - - H. litorea Cheng et al. 2024
    - - H. salina Xu et al. 2016
      - - H. oriensis Inoue et al. 2011
        - H. rubra Zhou et al. 2018

== See also ==
- List of Archaea genera
