= Halocalculus aciditolerans =

Scientific classification
- Domain: Archaea
- Kingdom: Methanobacteriati
- Phylum: Methanobacteriota
- Class: Halobacteria
- Order: Halobacteriales
- Family: Halobacteriaceae
- Genus: Halocalculus
- Species: H. aciditolerans

Binomial name
- Halocalculus aciditolerans Minegishi et al. 2015

Genus of archaea

Halocalculus aciditolerans is a halophilic archaeon in the family of Halobacteriaceae and the only described species in the genus Halocalculus (common abbreviation Hcl.).
