= Salinirubellus salinus =

Scientific classification
- Domain: Archaea
- Kingdom: Methanobacteriati
- Phylum: Methanobacteriota
- Class: Halobacteria
- Order: Halobacteriales
- Family: Halobacteriaceae
- Genus: Salinirubellus
- Species: S. salinus

Binomial name
- Salinirubellus salinus Hou et al. 2018

Species of archaeon

Salinirubellus salinus is an halophile archaeal species. It was first isolated from a marine solar saltern in Zhejiang Province in China.
