= Halanaeroarchaeum sulfurireducens =

Scientific classification
- Domain: Archaea
- Kingdom: Methanobacteriati
- Phylum: Methanobacteriota
- Class: Halobacteria
- Order: Halobacteriales
- Family: Halobacteriaceae
- Genus: Halanaeroarchaeum
- Species: H. sulfurireducens

Binomial name
- Halanaeroarchaeum sulfurireducens Sorokin et al. 2016

Species of archaeon

Halanaeroarchaeum sulfurireducens is a halophilic archaeon in the family of Halobacteriaceae and the only described species in the genus Halanaeroarchaeum (common abbreviation Haa.). In contrast to many of the known related halophilic archaea, H. sulfurireducens is anaerobic.
