= Heimdallarchaeum =

Scientific classification (Candidatus)
- Domain: Archaea
- Kingdom: Promethearchaeati
- Phylum: Promethearchaeota
- Class: "Heimdallarchaeia"
- Order: "Heimdallarchaeales"
- Family: "Heimdallarchaeaceae"
- Genus: Heimdallarchaeum Wu et al. 2022

Type species
- "Candidatus Heimdallarchaeum" Wu et al. 2022

Species
- "Ca. H. aukensis"; "Ca. H. endolithica"

Candidatus genus of archaea

"Candidatus Heimdallarchaeum" is a genus of archaea that in turn forms a distinct group within the Promethearchaeati kingdom. Named after the mythical Norse god, Heimdall, one of the sons of Odin, it is considered the closest relative of eukaryotes. The first specimens were discovered by a team of microbiologists at the Uppsala University, Sweden from the marine sediments at Loki's Castle (hydrothermal vents in the mid-Atlantic Ocean) and Bay of Aarhus (a waterway in Denmark), and some other species from Auka hydrothermal vent field in the Pacific Ocean. Its class, "Candidatus Heimdallarchaeia" is the group of archaea that eukaryotes emerged. A later study reports that their newly developed data shows that the promethearchaeon ancestors of eukaryotes are rooted in a group older than the "Candidatus Heimdallarchaeia. The genus and its family, order and class are not recognized by LPSN as "pro-correct".

== See also ==
- List of Archaea genera
