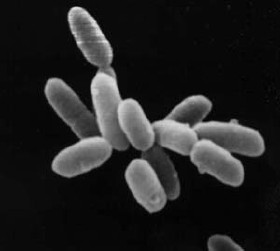
- Halobacterium sp. strain NRC-1, each cell about 5 μm in length

Scientific classification
- Domain: Archaea
- Kingdom: Methanobacteriati
- Phylum: Methanobacteriota
- Class: Halobacteria
- Order: Halobacteriales
- Family: Halobacteriaceae
- Genus: Halobacterium (Elazari-Volcani 1940) Elazari-Volcani 1957 non Schoop 1935

Type species
- Halobacterium salinarum (Harrison & Kennedy 1922) Elazari-Volcani 1957

Species
- See text

Synonyms
- Flavobacterium ("Halobacterium") Elazari-Volcani 1940; "Halobacter" Anderson 1954

= Halobacterium =

Genus of archaea

Halobacterium (common abbreviation Hbt.), from Ancient Greek ἅλς (háls), meaning "salt", and "bacterium", is a genus in the family Halobacteriaceae.

The genus Halobacterium ("salt" or "ocean bacterium") consists of several species of Archaea with an aerobic metabolism which requires an environment with a high concentration of salt; many of their proteins will not function in low-salt environments. They grow on amino acids in their aerobic conditions. Their cell walls are also quite different from those of bacteria, as ordinary lipoprotein membranes fail in high salt concentrations. In shape, they may be either rods or cocci, and in color, either red or purple. They reproduce via binary fission (constriction), and are motile. Halobacterium grows best in a 42 °C environment. The genome of an unspecified Halobacterium species, sequenced by Shiladitya DasSarma, comprises 2,571,010 bp (base pairs) of DNA compiled into three circular strands: one large chromosome with 2,014,239 bp, and two smaller ones with 191,346 and 365,425 bp. This species, called Halobacterium sp. NRC-1, has been extensively used for postgenomic analysis. Halobacterium species can be found in the Great Salt Lake, the Dead Sea, Lake Magadi, and any other waters with high salt concentration. Purple Halobacterium species owe their color to bacteriorhodopsin, a light-sensitive membrane protein which acts as a proton pump, providing chemical energy with the proton gradient for the cell using light energy. The resulting proton gradient across the cell membrane is used to drive ATP synthase to generate adenosine triphosphate (ATP). Bacteriorhodopsin is very similar to rhodopsin, light-sensitive receptor proteins found in the retina of most animals.

== Species of Halobacterium ==
=== Phylogeny ===
The currently accepted taxonomy is based on the List of Prokaryotic names with Standing in Nomenclature (LPSN) and National Center for Biotechnology Information (NCBI).

16S rRNA based LTP_07_2026

- Halobacterium
  - H. zhouii
  - - H. wangiae
    - - - H. jilantaiense
        - - H. rubrum
          - H. salinarum
      - - H. litoreum
        - - H. bonnevillei
          - - H. hubeiense
            - H. noricense

53 marker proteins based GTDB 11-RS232

- Halobacterium
  - H. zhouii Wang et al. 2023
  - - - H. wangiae Wang et al. 2023
      - H. litoreum Lu et al. 2017
    - - - H. salinarum corrig. (Harrison & Kennedy 1922) Elazari-Volcani 1957
        - - H. jilantaiense Yang et al. 2006
          - H. rubrum Han & Cui 2015
      - - - H. bonnevillei Myers & King 2020
          - H. yunchengense Cui et al. 2025
        - - H. hubeiense Leon et al. 2024
          - H. noricense Gruber et al. 2005

=== Synonyms ===
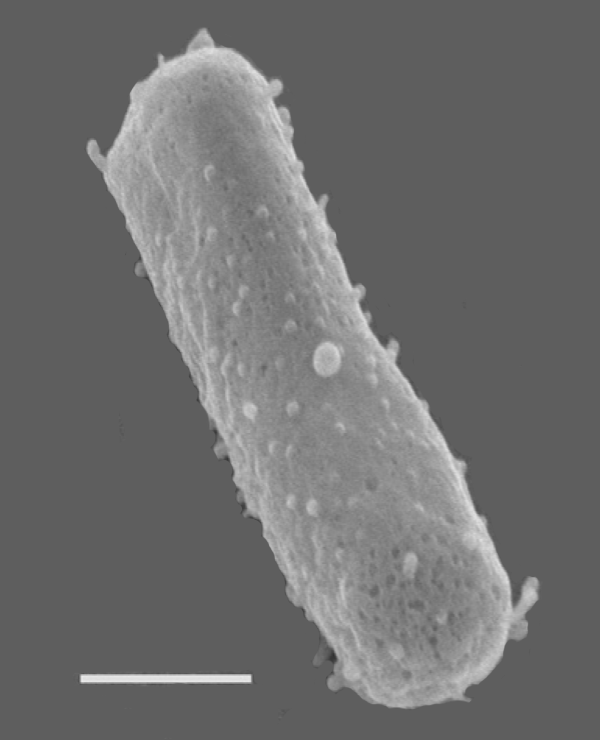
Halobacterium salinarum NRC-1 Size bar = 270 nm

- Halobacterium cutirubrum > Halobacterium salinarum
- Halobacterium denitrificans > Haloferax denitrificans
- Halobacterium distributum > Halorubrum distributum
- Halobacterium halobium > Halobacterium salinarum
- Halobacterium lacusprofundi > Halorubrum lacusprofundi
- Halobacterium mediterranei > Haloferax mediterranei
- Halobacterium pharaonis > Natronomonas pharaonis
- Halobacterium piscisalsi > Halobacterium salinarum
- Halobacterium saccharovorum > Halorubrum saccharovorum
- Halobacterium sodomense > Halorubrum sodomense
- Halobacterium trapanicum > Halorubrum trapanicum
- Halobacterium vallismortis > Haloarcula vallismortis
- Halobacterium volcanii > Haloferax volcanii

== Genome structure ==
The Halobacterium NRC-1 genome is 2,571,010 bp compiled into three circular replicons. More specifically, it is divided into one large chromosome with 2,014,239 bp and two small replicons pNRC100 (191,346 bp) and pNRC200 (365,425 bp). While much smaller than the large chromosome, the two plasmids account for most of the 91 insertion sequences and include genes for a DNA polymerase, seven transcription factors, genes in potassium and phosphate uptake, and cell division. The genome was discovered to contain a high G+C content at 67.9% on the large chromosome and 57.9% and 59.2% on the two plasmids. The genome also contained 91 insertion sequence elements constituting 12 families, including 29 on pNRC100, 40 on pNRC200, and 22 on the large chromosome. This helps explain the genetic plasticity that has been observed in Halobacterium. Of the archaea, halobacteria are viewed as being involved in the most lateral genetics (gene transfer between domains) and a proof that this transfer does take place.

=== Genome repair ===
In Halobacterium sp. NRC-1, homologs of the E. coli nucleotide excision repair genes uvrA, uvrB and uvrC are required tor the removal of UV induced DNA damages (in the absence of photoreactivating light). Investigation of DNA repair in this archaeal halobacterium has contributed to our understanding of the diversity and evolution of genomic DNA repair systems generally.

== Cell structure and metabolism ==
Halobacterium species are rod-shaped and enveloped by a single lipid bilayer membrane surrounded by an S-layer made from the cell-surface glycoprotein. They grow on amino acids in aerobic conditions. Although Halobacterium NRC-1 contains genes for glucose degradation, as well as genes for enzymes of a fatty acid oxidation pathway, it does not seem able to use these as energy sources. Though the cytoplasm retains an osmotic equilibrium with the hypersaline environment, the cell maintains a high potassium concentration using many active transporters.

Many Halobacterium species possess proteinaceous organelles called gas vesicles.

== Ecology ==
Halobacteria can be found in highly saline lakes such as the Great Salt Lake, the Dead Sea, and Lake Magadi. Halobacterium can be identified in bodies of water by the light-detecting pigment bacteriorhodopsin, which not only provides the archaeon with chemical energy, but adds to its reddish hue as well. An optimal temperature for growth has been observed at 37 °C.

Halobacterium may be a candidate for a life form present on Mars. One of the problems associated with the survival on Mars is the destructive ultraviolet light. These microorganisms develop a thin crust of salt that can moderate some of the ultraviolet light. Sodium chloride is the most common salt and chloride salts are opaque to short-wave ultraviolet. Their photosynthetic pigment, bacteriorhodopsin, is actually opaque to the longer-wavelength ultraviolet (its red color). In addition, Halobacterium makes pigments called bacterioruberins that are thought to protect cells from damage by ultraviolet light. The obstacle they need to overcome is being able to grow at a low temperature during a presumably short time when a pool of water could be liquid.

== Applications ==
=== Food Industry ===
There is potential for Halobacterium species to be used in the food industry. Some examples of uses can include the production of Beta-Carotene, a pigment in halophilic bacteria that contributes to their red coloration, is used in the food industry as a natural food dye. Halophiles also produce degradative enzymes such as lipases, amylases, proteases, and xylanases that are used in various food processing methods. Notable applications of these enzymes include enhancing the fermentation process of salty foods, improving dough quality for the baking of breads, and contributing to the production of coffee.

=== Bioremediation ===
Many species of halophilic bacteria produce exopolysaccharides (EPS) which are used industrially as bioremediation agents. Biosurfactants are also released by many halophilic bacteria and these amphiphilic compounds have been used for soil remediation. Many halophiles are highly tolerant of heavy metals making them potentially useful in the bioremediation of xenobiotic compounds and heavy metals that are released into the environment from mining and metal plating. Halophiles contribute to the bioremediation of contaminants by converting xenobiotics into less toxic compounds. Some Halobacterium species have been shown to be effective in the bioremediation of pollutants including aliphatic hydrocarbons, such as those found in crude oil; and aromatic hydrocarbons such as 4-hydroxybenzoic acid, a contaminant in some high salinity industrial runoffs.

=== Pharmaceuticals ===
Some strains of Halobacterium, including Halobacterium salinarum, are being explored for medical applications of their radiation-resistance mechanisms. Bacterioruberin is a carotenoid pigment found in Halobacterium which decreases the bacteria's sensitivity to γ-radiation and UV radiation.

It has been shown in knockout studies, that the absence of bacterioruberin increases the sensitivity of the bacterium to oxidative DNA-damaging agents. Hydrogen peroxide, for example, reacts with bacteroruberin which prevents the production of reactive oxygen species, and thus protects the bacterium by reducing the oxidative capacity of the DNA-damaging agent.

H. salinarum also exhibits high intracellular concentrations of potassium chloride which has also been shown to confer radiation resistance. Halobacterium are also being explored for the pharmaceutical applications of bioactive compounds they produce, including anticancer agents, antimicrobial biosurfactancts, and antimicrobial metabolites.

== Significance and applications ==
Halobacteria are halophilic microorganisms that are currently being studied for their uses in scientific research and biotechnology. For instance, genomic sequencing of the Halobacterium species NRC-1 revealed their use of eukaryotic-like RNA polymerase II and translational machinery that are related to Escherichia coli and other Gram-negative bacteria. In addition, they possess genes for DNA replication, repair, and recombination that are similar to those present in bacteriophages, yeasts, and bacteria. The ability of this Halobacterium species to be easily cultured and genetically modified allows it to be used as a model organism in biological studies. Furthermore, Halobacterium NRC-1 have also been employed as a potential vector for delivering vaccines. In particular, they produce gas vesicles that can be genetically engineered to display specific epitopes. Additionally, the gas vesicles demonstrate the ability to function as natural adjuvants to help evoke stronger immune responses. Because of the requirement of Halobacteria for a high-salt environment, the preparation of these gas vesicles is inexpensive and efficient, needing only tap water for their isolation.

Halobacteria also contain a protein called Bacteriorhodopsins which are light-driven proton pumps found on the cell membrane. Although most proteins in halophiles need high salt concentrations for proper structure and functioning, this protein has shown potential to be used for biotechnological purposes because of its stability even outside of these extreme environments. Bacteriorhodopsins isolated from Halobacterium salinarum have been especially studied for their applications in electronics and optics. Particularly, bacteriorhodopsins have been used in holographic storage, optical switching, motion detection, and nanotechnology. Although numerous uses of this protein have been presented, there are yet to be any high-scale commercial applications established at this time.

== Recombination and mating ==
UV irradiation of Halobacterium sp. strain NRC-1 induces several gene products employed in homologous recombination. For instance, a homolog of the rad51/recA gene, which plays a key role in recombination, is induced 7-fold by UV. Homologous recombination may rescue stalled replication forks, and/or facilitate recombinational repair of DNA damage. In its natural habitat, homologous recombination is likely induced by the UV irradiation in sunlight.

Halobacterium volcanii has a distinctive mating system in which cytoplasmic bridges between cells appear to be used for transfer of DNA from one cell to another. In wild populations of Halorubrum, genetic exchange and recombination occur frequently. This exchange may be a primitive form of sexual interaction, similar to the more well studied bacterial transformation that is also a process for transferring DNA between cells leading to homologous recombinational repair of DNA damage.

== See also ==
- List of Archaea genera
