= Haloparvum =

Scientific classification
- Domain: Archaea
- Kingdom: Methanobacteriati
- Phylum: Methanobacteriota
- Class: Halobacteria
- Order: Haloferacales
- Family: Haloferacaceae
- Genus: Haloparvum; Chen et al. 2016

Type species
- Haloparvum sedimenti Chen et al. 2016

Species
- H. alkalitolerans; H. sedimenti

Genus of archaea

Haloparvum (common abbreviation Hpv.) is a genus of halophilic archaea in the family of Haloferacaceae.

== Phylogeny ==
The currently accepted taxonomy is based on the List of Prokaryotic names with Standing in Nomenclature (LPSN) and National Center for Biotechnology Information (NCBI).

16S rRNA based LTP_07_2026

- Haloparvum
  - H. alkalitolerans Kondô et al. 2016
  - H. sedimenti Chen et al. 2016

53 marker proteins based GTDB 11-RS232

- Haloparvum
  - H. alkalitolerans
  - H. sedimenti

== See also ==
- List of Archaea genera
