= Halobacteriaceae =

Scientific classification
- Domain: Archaea
- Kingdom: Methanobacteriati
- Phylum: Methanobacteriota
- Class: Halobacteria
- Order: Halobacteriales
- Family: Halobacteriaceae; Gibbons 1974

Genera
- See text

Synonyms
- "Haloarchaeaceae" (sic) DasSarma & DasSarma 2008

Family of archaea

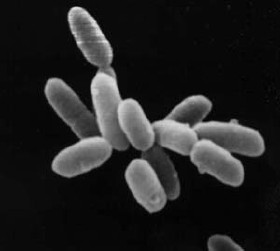

Halobacteriaceae, from Ancient Greek ἅλς (háls), meaning "salt", and "bacterium", is a family in the order Halobacteriales and the domain Archaea. Halobacteriaceae represent a large part of halophilic Archaea, along with members in two other methanogenic families, Methanosarcinaceae and Methanocalculaceae. The family consists of many diverse genera that can survive extreme environmental niches. Most commonly, Halobacteriaceae are found in hypersaline lakes and can even tolerate sites polluted by heavy metals. They include neutrophiles, acidophiles (ex. Halarchaeum acidiphilum), alkaliphiles (ex. Natronobacterium), and there have even been psychrotolerant species discovered (ex. Hrr. lacusprofundi). Some members have been known to live aerobically, as well as anaerobically, and they come in many different morphologies. These diverse morphologies include rods in genus Halobacterium, cocci in Halococcus, flattened discs or cups in Haloferax, and other shapes ranging from flattened triangles in Haloarcula to squares in Haloquadratum, and Natronorubrum. Most species of Halobacteriaceae are best known for their high salt tolerance and red-pink pigmented members (due to bacterioruberin carotenoids), but there are also non-pigmented species and those that require moderate salt conditions. Some species of Halobacteriaceae have been shown to exhibit phosphorus solubilizing activities that contribute to phosphorus cycling in hypersaline environments. Techniques such as 16S rRNA analysis and DNA–DNA hybridization have been major contributors to taxonomic classification in Halobacteriaceae, partly due to the difficulty in culturing halophilic Archaea.

== Overview ==
Halobacteriaceae are found in water saturated or nearly saturated with salt. They are also called halophiles, though this name is also used for other organisms which live in somewhat less concentrated salt water. They are common in most environments where large amounts of salt, moisture, and organic material are available. Large blooms appear reddish, from the pigment bacteriorhodopsin. This pigment is used to absorb light, which provides energy to create ATP. Halobacteria also possess a second pigment, halorhodopsin, which pumps in chloride ions in response to photons, creating a voltage gradient and assisting in the production of energy from light. The process is unrelated to other forms of photosynthesis involving electron transport and halobacteria are incapable of fixing carbon from carbon dioxide.

Halobacteria can exist in salty environments because although they are aerobes, they have a separate and different way of creating energy through use of light energy. Parts of the membranes of halobacteria are purplish in color and contain retinal pigment. This allows them to create a proton gradient across the membrane of the cell which can be used to create ATP for their own use.

They have certain adaptations to live within their salty environments. For example, their cellular machinery is adapted to high salt concentrations by having charged amino acids on their surfaces, allowing the cell to keep its water molecules around these components. The osmotic pressure and these amino acids help to control the amount of salt within the cell. However, because of these adaptations, if the cell is placed in a wet, less salty environment, it is likely to immediately burst from the osmotic pressure.

== Phylogeny ==
The currently accepted taxonomy is based on the List of Prokaryotic names with Standing in Nomenclature (LPSN) and National Center for Biotechnology Information (NCBI).

16S rRNA based LTP_07_2026

- - - Halobacteriaceae *
      - - Halanaeroarchaeum
        - Halodesulfurarchaeum
      - - Salarchaeum
        - - - Halocalculus
            - Halospeciosus
          - - Halarchaeum
            - Halobacterium
    - "Natronomonadaceae" *
      - - Halomarina
        - Halocatena [incl. Actinarchaeum]
      - - Haloglomus
        - - Salinirubellus
          - - - Halorarius halobius
              - - Halorarius litoreus
                - Halosegnis [incl. Salella]
            - Natronomonas
  - - Haloarculaceae
      - - - Halosiccatus [incl. [Halomicrobium salinisoli]
          - - - Haloglomus
              - Halosimplex
            - - Halarchaeoglobus
              - - Halovenus *
                - Salinibaculum
        - Haloarcula
      - - Halosimplex 2
        - - - Halomicrobium zhouii
            - - Halomicrobium mukohataei
              - Haloarcula~1
          - - Halorientalis
            - - - Salinibaculum *
                - - Salinirussus
                  - Halovenus~1
              - - Halorhabdus
                - - Halococcoides
                  - Halapricum

53 marker proteins based GTDB 11-RS232

- - - Haladaptataceae
    - - Halobacteriaceae *
        - - Halanaeroarchaeum Sorokin et al. 2016
          - Halodesulfurarchaeum Sorokin et al. 2017
        - - - - Halospeciosus Li et al. 2024
              - Salarchaeum Shimane et al. 2011
            - - Halocalculus Minegishi et al. 2015
              - Halarchaeum Minegishi et al. 2010
          - Halobacterium (Elazari-Volcani 1940) Elazari-Volcani 1957
  - - - Natronoarchaeaceae
      - Natrialbaceae
    - - - Halococcaceae
        - - Haloarculaceae
            - - - Halocatena * Verma et al. 2020
                  [incl. Actinarchaeum corrig. Tang et al. 2024]
                - Halomarina * Inoue et al. 2011
              - - Natronomonas * Kamekura et al. 1997
                - - - Halorarius Sun et al. 2023
                    - Halosegnis Duran-Viseras et al. 2022 [incl.
                      Salella Deshmukh & Oren 2023]
                  - - Salinirubellus * Hou et al. 2018
                    - Haloglomus Duran-Viseras, Sanchez-Porro & Ventosa 2020
            - - Halorientalis
              - - - Halococcoides
                  - - Halapricum
                    - Halorhabdus
                - - - - Salinirussus
                      - - Salinibaculum * Han & Cui 2020
                        - Halovenus * Makhdoumi-Kakhki et al. 2012
                    - Halosimplex
                  - - Halomicrobium [incl. Halosiccatus]
                    - Haloarcula [incl. Halomicroarcula]
      - Haloferacaceae

Note 1: * polyphyletic Halobacteriaceae
Note 2: Unassigned Halobacteriaceae

- "Haloalcalophilium" Lizama et al. 2000a

== See also ==
- List of Archaea genera
