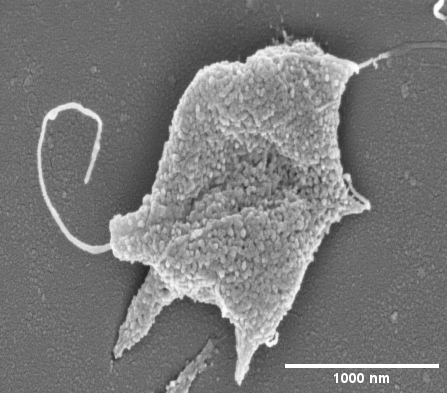
- SEM image of Haloarcula quadrata.

Scientific classification
- Domain: Archaea
- Kingdom: Methanobacteriati
- Phylum: Methanobacteriota
- Class: Halobacteria
- Order: Halobacteriales; Grant & Larsen, 1989

Families
- "Abyssiniarchaeaceae"; "Afararchaeaceae"; Haladaptaceae; Halalkalicoccaceae; Haloarculaceae; Halobacteriaceae; Halococcaceae; Haloferacaceae; Halorutilaceae; "Hikarchaeaceae"; "Karumarchaeaceae"; Natrialbaceae; Natronoarchaeaceae; "Salinarchaeaceae"

Synonyms
- "Haloarchaeales" (sic) DasSarma & DasSarma 2008; Haloferacales Gupta et al. 2015; Halorutilales Durán-Viseras et al. 2023; "Hikarchaeales" Martijn et al. 2020; Natrialbales Gupta et al. 2015

= Halobacteriales =

Order of archaea

Halobacteriales, from Ancient Greek ἅλς (háls), meaning "salt", and "bacterium", are an order of the Halobacteria, found in water saturated or nearly saturated with salt. They are also called halophiles, though this name is also used for other organisms which live in somewhat less concentrated salt water. They are common in most environments where large amounts of salt, moisture, and organic material are available. Large blooms appear reddish, from the pigment bacteriorhodopsin. This pigment is used to absorb light, which provides energy to create ATP. Halobacteria also possess a second pigment, halorhodopsin, which pumps in chloride ions in response to photons, creating a voltage gradient and assisting in the production of energy from light. The process is unrelated to other forms of photosynthesis involving electron transport; however, and halobacteria are incapable of fixing carbon from carbon dioxide.

Halobacteria can exist in salty environments because although they are aerobes they have a separate and different way of creating energy through photosynthesis. Parts of the membranes of halobacteria are purplish in color. These parts conduct photosynthetic reactions with retinal pigment rather than chlorophyll. This allows them to create a proton gradient across the membrane of the cell which can be used to create ATP for their own use. Some species in this order are used as model organisms to study how some microorganisms can survive in hypersaline environments, understand cellular processes and to research their physiology.

== Ecology ==
=== Habitats ===
Usually, Halobacteriales grow in aerobic and high salinity environments. Halobacteriales have been found in salt lakes, marine salterns, seawater, solar salts and salted food products. Mostly, members of the order Halobacteriales can be located in environments where concentration of salt (NaCl) exceeds 25%. However, they can also survive in environments with low concentrations of salt, between 1 and 3.5%. Studies show Halobacteriales can also be found in environments where sulfur reduction takes part as well as in salinity salterns, seawater black smoker, coastal salt marshes and chimney structures. These results show Halobacteriales only need enough salt to prevent their lysis and thus can grow in environments with low salinity concentration.

== Current taxonomy ==
Halobacteriales was a large phylogenetically diverse lineage encompassing all Halobacteria species. The wide variety of biochemical characteristics and different ecological niches of the class Haloarchaea proved to be an unreliable tool in clarifying the evolutionary relationships of Halobacteria above the genus level.

In 2015, Gupta et al. proposed the division of class Halobacteria into three orders, Halobacteriales, Haloferacales and Natrialbales based on comparative genomic analyses and the branching pattern of various phylogenetic trees constructed from several different datasets of conserved proteins and 16S rRNA sequences. This division greatly restricted the membership of the order Halobacteriales to include only species which were closely related to the type genus, Halobacterium.

A subsequent study examining higher taxonomic relationships within the order Halobacteriales resulted in the division of the order into three families, Halobacteriaceae, Haloarculaceae and Halococcaceae, each of which can be distinguished from each other and all other species through the presence of multiple highly specific molecular signatures, known as conserved signature indels.

== Phylogeny ==
The currently accepted taxonomy is based on the List of Prokaryotic names with Standing in Nomenclature (LPSN) and National Center for Biotechnology Information (NCBI).

16S rRNA based LTP_07_2026

- Halobacteriales
  - - Natronoarchaeaceae
    - - Haloparvum **
      - - Halopenitus **
        - Halorubraceae
  - - Haloferacaceae
    - - - - Halobacteriaceae
          - "Natronomonadaceae"
        - Haloarculaceae
      - - - "Halostellaceae" *
          - - "Halalkalicoccaceae"
            - Halococcaceae
        - - - "Salinarchaeaceae" *
            - Haladaptaceae [incl. Halorubellaceae]
          - Natrialbaceae

53 marker proteins based GTDB 11-RS232

- Halobacteriales
  - - "Afararchaeaceae"
    - Halorutilaceae
  - - "Hikarchaeaceae"
    - - "Salinarchaeaceae" *
      - - Halalkalicoccaceae
        - - - Haladaptaceae
            - Halobacteriaceae
          - - - Natronoarchaeaceae [incl. "Halostellaceae"]
              - Natrialbaceae [incl. Halorubellaceae]
            - - - Halococcaceae
                - Haloarculaceae [incl. "Halomicrobiaceae"; "Natronomonadaceae"]
              - Haloferacaceae [incl. Halorubraceae]

Note: * polyphyletic Natronoarchaeaceae

** polyphyletic Haloferacaceae

== See also ==
- List of Archaea genera
