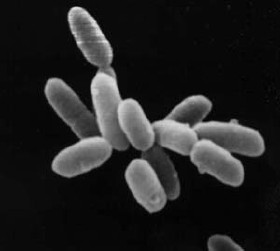
- Halobacterium sp. strain NRC-1, each cell about 5 µm in length.

Scientific classification
- Domain: Archaea
- Kingdom: Methanobacteriati
- Phylum: Methanobacteriota
- Class: Halobacteria; Grant et al. 2002

Orders
- Halobacteriales; Haloferacales; Halorutilales; Natrialbales

Synonyms
- Halomebacteria Cavalier-Smith 2002; Haloarchaea DasSarma and DasSarma 2008

= Haloarchaea =

Class of salt-tolerant archaea

Haloarchaea (halophilic archaea, halophilic archaebacteria, halobacteria) are a class of archaea under the phylum Euryarchaeota, found in water saturated or nearly saturated with salt. 'Halobacteria' are now recognized as archaea rather than bacteria and are one of the largest groups of archaea. The name 'halobacteria' was assigned to this group of organisms before the existence of the domain Archaea was realized, and while valid according to taxonomic rules, should be updated. Halophilic archaea are generally referred to as haloarchaea to distinguish them from halophilic bacteria.

These halophilic microorganisms require high salt concentrations to grow, with most species requiring more than 2M NaCl for growth and survival.

Haloarchaea can grow aerobically or anaerobically. Parts of the membranes of haloarchaea are purplish in color, and large blooms of haloarchaea appear reddish from retinal-containing bacteriorhodopsin, a protein related to rhodopsin, which it uses to transform light energy into chemical energy by a process unrelated to chlorophyll-based photosynthesis.

Haloarchaea have a potential to solubilize phosphorus. Phosphorus-solubilizing halophilic archaea may well play a role in making phosphorus available to vegetation growing in hypersaline soils. Haloarchaea may also have applications as inoculants for crops growing in hypersaline regions.

== Taxonomy ==
The extremely halophilic, aerobic members of Archaea are classified within the family Halobacteriaceae, order Halobacteriales in Class III. Halobacteria of the phylum Euryarchaeota (International Committee on Systematics of Prokaryotes, Subcommittee on the taxonomy of Halobacteriaceae). As of May 2016, the family Halobacteriaceae comprises 213 species in 50 genera.

Gupta et al. divides the class of Halobacteria in three orders.

- Halobacteriales Grant and Larsen 1989
  - Haladaptataceae Cui et al. 2023
  - Haloarculaceae Gupta et al. 2016, 10 genera
  - Halobacteriaceae Gibbons 1974, 24 genera
  - Halococcaceae Gupta et al. 2016, 1 genus
  - Natronoarchaeaceae Sorokin et al. 2023
- Haloferacales Gupta et al. 2015
  - Haloferacaceae Gupta et al. 2015, 10 genera
  - Halorubraceae Gupta et al. 2016, 9 genera
- Halorutilales Durán-Viseras et al. 2023
  - Halorutilaceae Durán-Viseras et al. 2023
- Natrialbales Gupta et al. 2015
  - Natrialbaceae Gupta et al. 2015, 18 genera

== Phylogeny ==
The currently accepted taxonomy is based on the List of Prokaryotic names with Standing in Nomenclature (LPSN) and National Center for Biotechnology Information (NCBI).

16S rRNA based LTP_07_2026

- Halobacteria Halobacteriales
  - - Natronoarchaeaceae
    - - Haloparvum **
      - - Halopenitus **
        - Halorubraceae
  - - Haloferacaceae
    - - - - Halobacteriaceae
          - "Natronomonadaceae"
        - Haloarculaceae
      - - - "Halostellaceae" *
          - - "Halalkalicoccaceae"
            - Halococcaceae
        - - - "Salinarchaeaceae" *
            - Haladaptaceae [incl. Halorubellaceae]
          - Natrialbaceae

53 marker proteins based GTDB 11-RS232

- Halobacteria Halobacteriales
  - - "Afararchaeaceae"
    - Halorutilaceae
  - - "Hikarchaeaceae"
    - - "Salinarchaeaceae" *
      - - Halalkalicoccaceae
        - - - Haladaptaceae
            - Halobacteriaceae
          - - - Natronoarchaeaceae [incl. "Halostellaceae"]
              - Natrialbaceae [incl. Halorubellaceae]
            - - - Halococcaceae
                - Haloarculaceae [incl. "Halomicrobiaceae"; "Natronomonadaceae"]
              - Haloferacaceae [incl. Halorubraceae]

Note: * polyphyletic Natronoarchaeaceae

** polyphyletic Haloferacaceae

== Molecular signatures ==
Detailed phylogenetic and comparative analyses of genome sequences from members of the class Haloarchaea has led to division of this class into three orders, Halobacteriales, Haloferacales and Natrialbales, which can be reliably distinguished from each other as well as all other archaea/bacteria through molecular signatures known as conserved signature indels (CSIs). These studies have also identified 68 conserved signature proteins (CSPs) whose homologs are only found in the members of these three orders and 13 CSIs in different proteins that are uniquely present in the members of the class Haloarchaea. These CSIs are present in the following proteins: DNA topoisomerase VI, nucleotide sugar dehydrogenase, ribosomal protein L10e, RecJ-like exonuclease, ribosomal protein S15, adenylosuccinate synthase, phosphopyruvate hydratase, RNA-associated protein, threonine synthase, aspartate aminotransferase, precorrin-8x methylmutase, protoporphyrin IX magnesium chelatase and geranylgeranylglyceryl phosphate synthase-like protein.

== Living environment ==
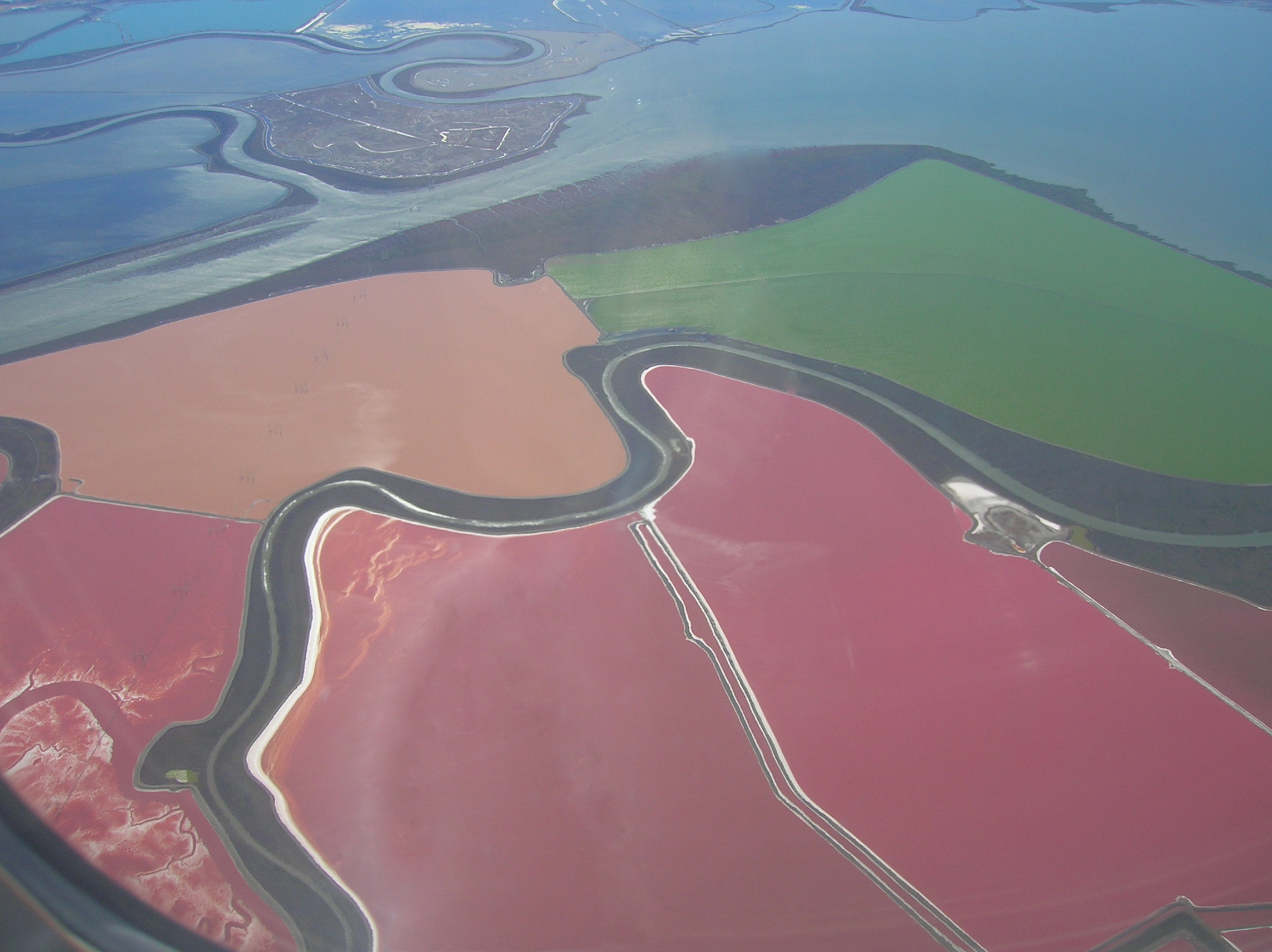
Salt ponds with pink colored Haloarchaea on the edge of San Francisco Bay, near Fremont, California

Haloarchaea require salt concentrations in excess of 2 mol/L (or about 10%, three times the ocean salinity which is around 35g/L salt – 3.5%) in the water to grow, and optimal growth usually occurs at much higher concentrations, typically 20–30% (3.4 - 5.2 mol/L of NaCl). However, Haloarchaea can grow up to saturation (about 37% salts). Optimal growth also occurs when pH is neutral or basic and at 45°C temperature. Some haloarchaea can grow even when temperatures exceed 50°C.

Haloarchaea are found mainly in hypersaline lakes and solar salterns. Their high densities in the water often lead to pink or red colourations of the water (the cells possessing high levels of carotenoid pigments, presumably for UV protection). The pigmentation will become enhanced when oxygen levels are low due to an increase in a red pigmented ATP. Some of them live in underground rock salt deposits, including one from middle-late Eocene (38-41 million years ago). Some even older ones from more than 250 million years ago have been reported. Haloarchaea are also used to treat water high in salinity. This is due to its ability to withstand high nutrient levels and the heavy metals that may be present.

== Adaptations to environment ==
Haloarchaea can grow at water activity (a_{w}) close to 0.75, even though a_{w} lower than 0.90 is inhibitory to most microbes. The high solute concentration causes osmotic stress on microbes, which can cause cell lysis, unfolding of proteins, and inactivation of enzymes. Haloarchaea combat this by retaining compatible solutes such as potassium chloride (KCl) in their intracellular space to allow them to balance osmotic pressure. Retaining these salts is referred to as the "salt-in" method where the cell accumulates a high internal concentration of potassium. Because of the elevated potassium levels, haloarchaea have specialized proteins that have a highly negative surface charge to tolerate high potassium concentrations.

Haloarchaea have adapted to use glycerol as a carbon and energy source in catabolic processes, which is often present in high salt environments due to Dunaliella species that produce glycerol in large quantities.

== Phototrophy ==
Bacteriorhodopsin is used to absorb light, which provides energy to transport protons (H^{+}) across the cellular membrane. The concentration gradient generated from this process can then be used to synthesize ATP. Many haloarchaea also possess related pigments, including halorhodopsin, which pump chloride ions in the cell in response to photons, creating a voltage gradient and assisting in the production of energy from light. The process is unrelated to other forms of photosynthesis involving electron transport, however, and haloarchaea are incapable of fixing carbon from carbon dioxide. Early evolution of retinal proteins has been proposed in the purple Earth hypothesis.

== Cellular shapes ==
Haloarchaea are often considered pleomorphic, or able to take on a range of shapes—even within a single species. This makes identification by microscopic means difficult, and it is now more common to use gene sequencing techniques for identification instead.

One of the more unusually shaped Haloarchaea is the "Square Haloarchaeon of Walsby", classified in 2004 using a very low nutrition solution to allow growth along with a high salt concentration. Haloquadratum is square in shape and extremely thin (like a postage stamp). This shape is probably only permitted by the high osmolarity of the water, permitting cell shapes that would be difficult, if not impossible, under other conditions.

== As exophiles ==
Haloarchaea have been proposed as a kind of life that could live on Mars; since the Martian atmosphere has a pressure below the triple point of water, freshwater species would have no habitat on the Martian surface. The presence of high salt concentrations in water lowers its freezing point, in theory allowing for halophiles to exist in saltwater on Mars. Recently, haloarchaea were sent 36 km (about 22 miles) up into Earth's atmosphere, within a balloon. The two types that were sent up were able to survive the freezing temperatures and high radiation levels, supporting the hypothesis that halophiles could survive on Mars.

== Medical use ==
Certain types of haloarchaea that produce carotenoids could potentially serve as a source of carotenoids for medical use. Haloarchaea have been proposed to help meet the high demand of carotenoids by pharmaceutical companies due to how easily it can be grown in a lab. Genes in Haloarchaea can also be manipulated in order to produce various strands of carotenoids, further helping meet pharmaceutical companies' needs.

Haloarchaea are also present within the human gut, mostly predominant in the gut of people who live in Korea. Haloarchaea are most abundant in Koreans' guts rather than methanogens due to their saltier diets. This also shows that the archaeome in the human gut can vary drastically depending on region and what is eaten.

== Climate change ==
Certain types of haloarchaea have been proposed as sources of biodegradable plastics, which could help decrease plastic pollution. Haloarchaea are able to produce polyhydroxyalkanote (PHA), polyhydroxybutyrate (PHB), and polyhydroxyvalerate (PHV) when exposed to certain conditions. For large-scale production of these bioplastics, haloarchaea are favored due to the low cost, fast growth, and lack of need to sterilize area due to the salty environment they prefer. They are also a cleaner option for bioplastics due to them not needing chemicals for cell lysis and the higher recyclability of the process.

Certain types of haloarchaea have also been found to have denitrifying characteristics. If haloarchaea are complete denitrifiers, they could aid salt marshes and other salty environments by buffering these areas of nitrate and nitrite. This could help animal diversity and decrease pollution in these waterways. However, when tested in the lab, haloarchaea have been found to be partial denitrifiers. This means that if haloarchaea are used to treat areas that are high in nitrite and nitrate, they could contribute to nitrogen contaminates and cause an increase in ozone depletion, furthering climate change. The only type of haloarchaea that has been found to reduce atmospheric nitrogen pollution is Haloferax mediterranei. This shows that haloarchaea may be contributing to nitrogen pollution and are not a suitable solution for reducing nitrate and nitrite within high-salinity areas.

== See also ==
- Life on Mars
- Purple Earth hypothesis
- List of Archaea genera
