= List of sequenced archaeal genomes =

This list of sequenced archaeal genomes contains all the archaea known to have publicly available complete genome sequences that have been assembled, annotated and deposited in public databases. Methanococcus jannaschii was the first archaeon whose genome was sequenced, in 1996.

Currently in this list there are 39 genomes belonging to Crenarchaeota species, 105 belonging to the Euryarchaeota, 1 genome belonging to Korarchaeota and to the Nanoarchaeota, 3 belonging to the Thaumarchaeota and 1 genome belonging to an unclassified Archaea, totalling 150 Archaeal genomes.

== Crenarchaeota ==
=== Acidilobales ===
Species	Strain	Base Pairs	Genes	Reference	GenBank identifier	Publication year
Acidilobus saccharovorans	345-15	1,496,000	1,547		CP001742	2010

=== Desulforococcales ===
Species	Strain	Base Pairs	Genes	Reference	GenBank identifier	Publication year
Aeropyrum pernix	K1	1,669,695	2,694		NC_000854 (NCBI Reference Sequence)	1999
Desulfurococcus kamchatkensis	1221n	1,365,000	1,521		CP001140	2009
Hyperthermus butylicus	DSM 5456	1,667,000	1,669		CP000493	2007
Ignicoccus hospitalis	KIN4/I, DSM 18386	1,297,000	1,496		CP000816	2008
Ignisphaera aggregans	AQ1.S1, DSM 17230	1,875,000	2,042		CP002098	2010
Pyrolobus fumarii	1A, DSM 11204	1,843,000	2,038		CP002838	2011
Staphylothermus hellenicus	P8, DSM 12710	1,580,000	1,716		CP002051	2011
Staphylothermus marinus	F1, DSM 3639	1,570,000	1,659		CP000575	2011
Thermosphaera aggregans	M11TL, DSM 11486	1,316,000	1,457		CP001939	2010

=== Sulfolobales ===
Species	Strain	Base Pairs	Genes	Reference	GenBank identifier	Publication year
Acidianus hospitalis	W1	2,137,000	2,424		CP002535	2011
Metallosphaera cuprina	Ar-4	1,840,000	2,077		CP002656	2011
Metallosphaera sedula	DSM 5348	2,191,000	2,347		CP000682	2008
Sulfolobus acidocaldarius	DSM 639	2,225,959	2,223		CP000077	2005
Sulfolobus islandicus	HVE10/4	2,655,000			CP002426	2011
Sulfolobus islandicus	L.D.8.5	2,722,000	2,996		Chromosome CP001731 Plasmid pLD8501 CP001732	2009
Sulfolobus islandicus	L.S.2.15	2,736,000	3,068		CP001399	2009
Sulfolobus islandicus	M.14.25	2,608,000	2,900		CP001400	2009
Sulfolobus islandicus	M.16.27	2,692,000	2,956		CP001401	2009
Sulfolobus islandicus	M.16.4	2,586,000	2,869		CP001402	2009
Sulfolobus islandicus	REY15A	2,522,000			CP002425	2011
Sulfolobus islandicus	Y.G.57.14	2,702,000	3,079		CP001403	2009
Sulfolobus islandicus	Y.N.15.51	2,812,000	3,318		Chromosome CP001404 Plasmid pYN01 CP001405	2009
Sulfolobus islandicus	LAL14/1	2,465,177	2,601		CP003928	2013
Sulfolobus solfataricus	P2	2,992,245	2,995		AE006641	2001
Sulfolobus solfataricus	98/2	2,668,000	2,728	DOE Joint Genome Institute	CP001800	2009
Sulfolobus tokodaii	7	2,694,765	2,826		BA000023	2001

=== Thermoproteales ===
Species	Strain	Base Pairs	Genes	Reference	GenBank identifier	Publication year
Caldivirga maquilingensis	IC-167	2,077,000	2,011	DOE Joint Genome Institute	CP000852	2007
Pyrobaculum aerophilum	IM2	2,222,430	2,605		AE009441	2002
Pyrobaculum arsenaticum	PZ6, DSM 13514	2,121,000	2,410	DOE Joint Genome Institute	CP000660	2007
Pyrobaculum calidifontis	JCM 11548	2,009,000	2,213	DOE Joint Genome Institute	CP000561	2007
Pyrobaculum islandicum	DSM 4184	1,826,000	2,063	DOE Joint Genome Institute	CP000504	2006
Pyrobaculum sp. 1860				Unpublished	CP003098	2011
Thermofilum pendens	Hrk 5	1,781,000	1,930		Chromosome CP000505 Plasmid pTPEN01 CP000506	2008
Thermoproteus neutrophilus	V24Sta	1,769,000	2,053	DOE Joint Genome Institute	CP001014	2008
Thermoproteus tenax	Kra1	1,841,000	2,100		FN869859	2011
Thermoproteus uzoniensis	768-20	1,936,000	2,229		CP002590	2011
Vulcanisaeta distributa	DSM 14429	2,374,000	2,592		CP002100	2010
Vulcanisaeta moutnovskia	768-28	2,298,000	2,393		CP002529	2011

== Euryarchaeota ==
=== Archaeoglobi ===
Species	Strain	Base Pairs	Genes	Reference	GenBank identifier	Publication year
Archaeoglobus fulgidus	DSM4304	2,178,400	2,407		AE000782	1997
Archaeoglobus veneficus	SNP6, DSM 11195	1,901,000	2,194	DOE Joint Genome Institute	CP002588	2011
Archaeoglobus profundus	Av18, DSM 5631	1,563,000	1,911		Chromosome CP001857 Plasmid pArcpr01 CP001858	2010
Ferroglobus placidus	AEDII12DO, DSM 10642	2,196,000	2,622		CP001899	2011

=== Halobacteria ===
Species	Strain	Base Pairs	Genes	Reference	GenBank identifier	Publication year
Halalkalicoccus jeotgali	B3, DSM 18796	3,690,000	3925		Chromosome I CP002062 Plasmid 1 CP002063; Plasmid 2 CP002064; Plasmid 3 CP002065; Plasmid 4 CP002066; Plasmid 5 CP002067; Plasmid 6 CP002068	2010
Haloarcula hispanica	CGMCC 1.2049	3,484,000	3,561		Chromosome I CP002921 Chromosome II CP002922; Plasmid pHH400 CP002923	2011
Haloarcula marismortui	ATCC 43049	3,131,724	3,131		Chromosome I AY596297 Chromosome II AY596298; Plasmid pNG100 AY596290; Plasmid pNG200 AY596291; Plasmid pNG300 AY596292; Plasmid pNG400 AY596293; Plasmid pNG500 AY596294; Plasmid pNG600 AY596295; Plasmid pNG700 AY596296	2004
Halobacterium salinarum	R1, DSM 671	2,000,000	2,801		Chromosome NC_010364 Plasmid PHS1 NC_010366; Plasmid PHS2 NC_010369; Plasmid PHS3 NC_010368; Plasmid PHS4 NC_010367	2008
Halobacterium species	NRC-1	2,014,239	2,058		Chromosome NC_002607 Plasmid pNRC100 NC_002607; Plasmid pNRC200 NC_002608	2000
Halobiforma lacisalsi	AJ5, JCM 12983	4,320,000	4,682		AGFZ00000000	2011
Haloferax volcanii	DS2				Chromosome CP001956 Plasmid pHV1 CP001957; Plasmid pHV2 CP001954; Plasmid pHV3 CP001953; Plasmid pHV4 CP001955	2010
Halogeometricum borinquense	PR3, DSM 11551	3,920,000	4,059		Chromosome CP001690 Plasmid pHBOR01 CP001691; Plasmid pHBOR02 CP001692; Plasmid pHBOR03 CP001693; Plasmid pHBOR04 CP001694; Plasmid pHBOR05 CP001695	2009
Halomicrobium mukohataei	arg-2, DSM 12286	3,332,000	3,475		Chromosome CP001688 Plasmid pHmuk01 CP001689	2009
Halopiger xanaduensis	SH-6	3,668,000	3,685	DOE Joint Genome Institute	Chromosome CP002839 Plasmid pHALXA01 CP002840; Plasmid pHALXA02 CP002841; Plasmid pHALXA03 CP002842	2011 (Chromosome)
Haloquadratum walsbyi	C23, DSM 16854	3,148,000			Chromosome FR746099 Plasmid PL6A FR746101; Plasmid PL6B FR746102; Plasmid PL100 FR746100	2011
Haloquadratum walsbyi	HBSQ001, DSM 16790	3,132,000	2,914		Chromosome AM180088 Plasmid PL47 AM180089	2006
Halorhabdus tiamatea	SARL4B	3,840,000	4,034		AFNT00000000	2011
Halorhabdus utahensis	AX-2, DSM 12940	3116 Kb	3076		CP001687	2009
Halorubrum lacusprofundi	ATCC 49239	4,300,000	3,725	DOE Joint Genome Institute	Chromosome 1 CP001365 Chromosome 2 CP001366; Plasmid pHLAC01 CP001367	2009 (Chromosomes 1 and 2)
Haloterrigena turkmenica	VKM B-1734, DSM 5511	5,440,000	5,351		Chromosome CP001860 Plasmid pHTUR01 CP001861; Plasmid pHTUR02 CP001862; Plasmid pHTUR03 CP001863; Plasmid pHTUR04 CP001864; Plasmid pHTUR05 CP001865; Plasmid pHTUR06 CP001866	2010
Natrialba asiatica	ATCC 700177				Survey	2004
Natrialba magadii	ATCC 43099	3,751,000	4,364	DOE Joint Genome Institute	CP001932	2010
Natronomonas pharaonis	DSM2160	2,595,221	2,675		Chromosome CR936257 Plasmid PL131 CR936258; Plasmid PL23 CR936259	2005

=== Methanobacteria ===
Species	Strain	Base Pairs	Genes	Reference	GenBank identifier	Publication year
Methanobacterium sp. AL-21		2,583,000		DOE Joint Genome Institute, Univ of Illinois at Urbana-Champaign	CP002551	2011
Methanobacterium sp. SWAN-1		2,546,000	2,500	DOE Joint Genome Institute, Univ Illinois at Urbana-Champaign	CP002772	2011
Methanobacterium thermoautotrophicum	delta-H	1,751,377	1,869		AE000666	1997
Methanobrevibacter ruminantium	M1	2,937,000	2,283		CP001719	2010
Methanobrevibacter smithii	DSM 2375	1,704,000	1,748	Washington University	ABYW00000000	2008
Methanobrevibacter smithii	F1, DSM 2374	1,707,000	1,749	Washington University	ABYV00000000	2010
Methanobrevibacter smithii	PS, ATCC 35061	1,853,000	1,841		CP000678	2007
Methanobrevibacter smithii	TS94A	1,889,000	1,808		AELU00000000	2011
Methanobrevibacter smithii	TS94B	1,886,000	1,856		AELV00000000	2011
Methanobrevibacter smithii	TS94C	1,910,000	1,812		AELW00000000	2011
Methanobrevibacter smithii	TS95A	1,992,000	1,961		AELX00000000	2011
Methanobrevibacter smithii	TS95B	1,972,000	1,895		AELY00000000	2011
Methanobrevibacter smithii	TS95C	1,978,000	1,874		AELZ00000000	2011
Methanobrevibacter smithii	TS95D	2,011,000	1,860		AEMA00000000	2011
Methanobrevibacter smithii	TS96A	1,975,000	1,852		AEMB00000000	2011
Methanobrevibacter smithii	TS96B	1,869,000	1,742		AEMC00000000	2011
Methanobrevibacter smithii	TS96C	1,818,000	1,764		AEMD00000000	2011
Methanobrevibacter smithii	TS145A	1,782,000	1,786		AEKU00000000	2011
Methanobrevibacter smithii	TS145B	1,797,000	1,880		AELL00000000	2011
Methanobrevibacter smithii	TS146A	1,792,000	1,823		AELM00000000	2011
Methanobrevibacter smithii	TS146B	1,794,000	1,814		AELN00000000	2011
Methanobrevibacter smithii	TS146C	1,947,000	2,355		AELO00000000	2011
Methanobrevibacter smithii	TS146D	1,713,000	1,693		AELP00000000	2011
Methanobrevibacter smithii	TS146E	1,952,000	1,887		AELQ00000000	2011
Methanobrevibacter smithii	TS147A	2,008,000	1,969		AELR00000000	2011
Methanobrevibacter smithii	TS147B	1,965,000	1,911		AELS00000000	2011
Methanobrevibacter smithii	TS147C	1,973,000	2,014		AELT00000000	2011
Methanosphaera stadtmanae	DSM 3091	1,767,403	1,534		CP000102	2005
Methanothermobacter marburgensis	Marburg DSM 2133	1,634,000	1,806		CP001710	2010
Methanothermus fervidus	V24S, DSM 2088	1,243,000	1,361		CP002278	2010

=== Methanococci ===
Species	Strain	Base Pairs	Genes	Reference	GenBank identifier	Publication year
Methanocaldococcus fervens	AG86	1,485,000	1,663	DOE Joint Genome Institute	Chromosome CP001696 Plasmid pMEFER01 CP001697	2009 (Chromosome)
Methanocaldococcus infernus	ME	1,328,000	1,513	DOE Joint Genome Institute	CP002009	2010
Methanocaldococcus jannaschii	DSM 2661	1,664,970	1,715		Chromosome: L77117 Large plasmid: L77118; Small plasmid: L77119	1996
Methanocaldococcus vulcanius	M7, DSM 12094	1,746,000	1,808	DOE Joint Genome Institute	Chromosome CP001787 Plasmid pMETVU01 CP001788; Plasmid pMETVU02 CP001789	2009
Methanocaldococcus sp. FS406-22		1,760,000	1,893	DOE Joint Genome Institute	Chromosome CP001901 Plasmid pFS01 CP001902	2010 (Chromosome)
Methanococcus aeolicus	Nankai-3	1,569,000	1,554	DOE Joint Genome Institute	CP000743	2007
Methanococcus maripaludis	C5	1,780,000	1,896	DOE Joint Genome Institute	CP000609	2007
Methanococcus maripaludis	C6	1,744,000	1,874	DOE Joint Genome Institute	CP000867	2007
Methanococcus maripaludis	C7	1,772,000	1,858	DOE Joint Genome Institute	CP000745	2007
Methanococcus maripaludis	S2	1,661,137	1,722		NC_005791 (NCBI Reference Sequence)	2004
Methanococcus maripaludis	X1	1,746,000	1,892		CP002913	2011
Methanococcus vannielii	SB	1,720,000	1,755	DOE Joint Genome Institute	CP000742	2007
Methanococcus voltae	A3	1,936,000	1,768	DOE Joint Genome Institute	CP002057	2010
Methanothermococcus okinawensis	IH1	1,662,000	1,662	DOE Joint Genome Institute	Chromosome CP002792 Plasmid pMETOK01 CP002793	2011 (Chromosome)
Methanotorris igneus	Kol5, DSM 5666	1,854,000	1,843	DOE Joint Genome Institute	CP002737	2011

=== Methanomicrobia ===
Species	Strain	Base Pairs	Genes	Reference	GenBank identifier	Publication year
Candidatus Methanoregula boonei	6A8	2,542,000	2,518	DOE Joint Genome Institute	CP000780	2007
Methanocella sp. Rice Cluster I (RC-I)	MRE50	3,179,916	3103	Genome sequence, then taxonomic placement	AM114193	2005
Methanocella paludicola	SANAE	2,957,635	3004		AP011532	2011
Methanocella conradii	HZ254	1,316,380	2512		CP003243	2012
Methanococcoides burtonii	DSM6242	2,575,032	2,273		CP000300	2009
Methanocorpusculum labreanum	Z	1,804,000	1,830		CP000559	2009
Methanoculleus marisnigri	JR1, DSM 1498	2,478,000	2,560		CP000562	2009
Methanohalobium evestigatum	Z-7303	2,406,232	2,254	DOE Joint Genome Institute	Chromosome: CP002069 Plasmid pMETEV01: CP002070	2010 (Chromosome)
Methanohalophilus mahii	SLP, DSM 5219	2,012,000	2,095		CP001994	2010
Methanoplanus petrolearius	SEBR 4847, DSM 11571	2,843,000	2,881		CP002117	2011
Methanosalsum zhilinae	WeN5, DSM 4017	2,138,000	2,086		CP002101	2010
Methanosaeta concilii	GP-6	3,008,000			CP002565	2010
Methanosaeta harundinacea	6Ac	2,559,000			CP003117	2011
Methanosaeta thermophila	PT	1,879,000	1,785	DOE Joint Genome Institute	CP000477	2006
Methanosarcina acetivorans	C2A	5,751,492	4,540		AE010299	2002
Methanosarcina barkeri	Fusaro, DSM 804	4,837,408	3,607		Chromosome CP000099 Plasmid 1 CP000098	2006 (Chromosome)
Methanosarcina mazei	Go1	4,096,345	3,371		AE008384	2002
Methanosphaerula palustris	E1-9c, DSM 19958	2,922,000	2,859	DOE Joint Genome Institute	CP001338	2008
Methanospirillum hungatei	JF-1	3,544,738	3,139	DOE Joint Genome Institute	CP000254	2006

=== Methanopyri ===
Species	Strain	Base Pairs	Genes	Reference	GenBank identifier	Publication year
Methanopyrus kandleri	AV19	1,694,969	1,691		AE009439	2002

=== Thermococci ===
Species	Strain	Base Pairs	Genes	Reference	GenBank identifier	Publication year
Pyrococcus abyssi	GE5	1,765,118	1,784		NC_000868 (NCBI Reference Sequence)	2000
Pyrococcus furiosus	DSM 3638	1,908,256	2,065		AE009950	1999
Pyrococcus horikoshii	OT3	1,738,505	2,061		NC_000961 (NCBI Reference Sequence)	1998
Pyrococcus sp. NA2		1,861,000	1,984		CP002670	2011
Pyrococcus yayanosii	CH1	1,716,000	1,952		CP002779	2011
Thermococcus barophilus	MP, DSM 11836	2,010,000	2,196		CP002372	2011
Thermococcus gammatolerans	EJ3	2,045,000	2,206		CP001398	2009
Thermococcus kodakaraensis	KOD1	2,088,737	2,306		AP006878	2005
Thermococcus onnurineus	NA1	1,847,000	2,027		NC_011529 (NCBI Reference Sequence)	2008
Thermococcus sibiricus	MM 739	1,845,000	2,085		CP001463	2009
Thermococcus sp. 4557		2,011,000	2,181		CP002920	2011
Thermococcus sp. AM4		2,086,000	2,279		CP002952	2011

=== Thermoplasmata ===
Species	Strain	Base Pairs	Genes	Reference	GenBank identifier	Publication year
Ferroplasma acidarmanus	Fer1	1,865,000	1,742		AABC00000000	2007
Picrophilus torridus	DSM 9790	1,545,895	1,535		AE017261	2004
Thermoplasma acidophilum	DSM 1728	1,564,906	1,478		NC_002578 (NCBI Reference Sequence)	2000
Thermoplasma volcanium	GSS1	1,584,804	1,526		NC_002689 (NCBI Reference Sequence)	2000

=== Unclassified Euryarchaeota ===
Species	Strain	Base Pairs	Genes	Reference	GenBank identifier	Publication year
Aciduliprofundum boonei	T469	1,486,000	1,587	DOE Joint Genome Institute	CP001941	2010

== Korarchaeota ==
Species	Strain	Base Pairs	Genes	Reference	GenBank identifier	Publication year
Candidatus Korarchaeum cryptofilum	OPF8	1,590,000	1,661		CP000968	2008

== Nanoarchaeota ==
Species	Strain	Base Pairs	Genes	Reference	GenBank identifier	Publication year
Nanoarchaeum equitans	Kin4-M	490,885	536		AE017199	2003

== Thaumarchaeota ==
=== Cenarchaeales ===
Species	Strain	Base Pairs	Genes	Reference	GenBank identifier	Publication year
Cenarchaeum symbiosum	A	2,045,000	2,066		DP000238	2006

=== Nitrosopumilales ===
Species	Strain	Base Pairs	Genes	Reference	GenBank identifier	Publication year
Candidatus Nitrosoarchaeum limnia	SFB1	1,769,000	2,171		AEGP00000000	2011
Nitrosopumilus maritimus	SCM1	1,645,000	1,842		CP000866	2010

== Unclassified Archaea ==
Species	Strain	Base Pairs	Genes	Reference	GenBank identifier	Publication year
halophilic archaeon sp. DL31				Unpublished	CP002988	2011

== See also ==
- Genome project
- Human microbiome project
- Lists of sequenced genomes
- List of sequenced bacterial genomes
- List of sequenced eukaryotic genomes
- List of sequenced mitochondrial genomes
- List of sequenced plastomes
- List of sequenced animal genomes
- List of sequenced animal mitochondrial genomes
- List of sequenced fungi genomes
- List of sequenced fungi mitochondrial genomes
- List of sequenced plant genomes
- List of sequenced plant mitochondrial genomes
- List of sequenced protist genomes
