= Caldisphaeraceae =

Scientific classification
- Domain: Archaea
- Kingdom: Thermoproteati
- Phylum: Thermoproteota
- Class: Thermoprotei
- Order: Acidilobales
- Family: Caldisphaeraceae; Prokofeva et al. 2009

Genus
- Caldisphaera

Family of archaea

Caldisphaeraceae are a family of archaea in the order Acidilobales.

== Phylogeny ==
The currently accepted taxonomy is based on the List of Prokaryotic names with Standing in Nomenclature (LPSN) and National Center for Biotechnology Information (NCBI)

16S rRNA based LTP_06_2022

- - - - Fervidicoccales
        Fervidicoccaceae
    - - Desulfurococcales 2
        - "Ignicoccaceae"
        - - Desulfurococcaceae 2
            - - Stetteria
              - Thermodiscus
            - Aeropyrum
  - - Desulfurococcales
      - - "Ignisphaeraceae"
        - Pyrodictiaceae
      - - Desulfurococcaceae
        - - Caldisphaeraceae
            Caldisphaera
          - Acidilobaceae
            Acidilobus
    - Sulfolobales
      Sulfolobaceae

53 marker proteins based GTDB 10-RS226

- Sulfolobales
  - - Desulfurococcaceae
    - - Fervidicoccaceae
      - - Pyrodictiaceae
        - - "Ignicoccaceae"
          - - Acidilobaceae
              - "Ca. Tiamatella"
              - - "Ca. Calypsonella"
                - - - Aeropyrum
                    - Thermodiscus
                  - - Caldisphaera
                    - Acidilobus
  - - - "Zestosphaeraceae"
      - Ignisphaeraceae
    - - Ignicoccaceae
      - Sulfolobaceae

== See also ==
- List of Archaea genera
