= Acidilobus saccharovorans =

Scientific classification
- Domain: Archaea
- Kingdom: Thermoproteati
- Phylum: Thermoproteota
- Class: Thermoprotei
- Order: Desulfurococcales
- Family: Acidilobaceae
- Genus: Acidilobus
- Species: A. saccharovorans

Binomial name
- Acidilobus saccharovorans Prokofeva et al., 2009

Species of archaeon

Acidilobus saccharovorans is a thermoacidophilic (that is, both thermophilic and acidophilic) species of anaerobic archaea. The species was originally described in 2009 after being isolated from hot springs in Kamchatka.

== Description ==
Acidilobus saccharovorans has a coccoid morphology of 1–2 μm diameter with a relatively thick S-layer and a bundle of flagella. It has an optimal growth temperature of 80–85°C (qualifying it as a hyperthermophile) and an optimal pH of 3.5–4.0. It is an obligate anaerobe with fermentative metabolism. Its growth is accelerated by the presence of elemental sulfur, which is reduced to hydrogen sulfide; however, sulfur is not essential for growth. It is resistant to the antibiotics chloramphenicol, penicillin and streptomycin. A. saccharovorans differs from A. aceticus, the only other recognized species in the genus, in two major respects: it is flagellated whereas A. aceticus is non-motile; and it is capable of growth on a wider variety of substrates, including many sugars and polysaccharides. Its name refers to this property of its metabolism.

== Genome and metabolism ==
The A. saccharovorans genome sequence was reported in 2010 as the first full genome of an archaeon that is thermoacidophilic and obligately anaerobic. The genome contains genes consistent with the Embden-Meyerhof and Entner-Doudoroff metabolic pathways. Unexpectedly, it was also found to contain genes encoding the oxidative tricarboxylic acid cycle enzymes, albeit without the key enzyme, ATP citrate lyase, that would enable the pathway to operate reductively. Unusually for an archaeon, it encodes a beta-oxidation pathway, which would be expected to enable it to grow on triacylglycerides and fatty acids. However, these metabolic capacities have not yet been demonstrated experimentally. The predicted proteome also contains a number of features interpreted as adaptation to growth in acidic conditions by making use of the high extracellular concentration of protons.

== Phylogenetics ==
Comparison to other sequenced genomes suggests that A. saccharovorans is most closely related to Aeropyrum pernix. The genome also contains evidence of horizontal gene transfer between Acidilobales and Sulfolobales, an order of aerobic thermoacidophiles often found in the same hot springs. The A. saccharovorans genome sequence was originally reported to support establishment of a new order, Acidilobales, containing the families Acidilobaceae and Caldisphaeraceae, which is currently accepted. However, a 2015 phylogenomics study of conserved archaeal protein sequences suggested that the two families instead were better placed in the order Desulfurococcales, which also contains Aeropyrum pernix.

== Ecology ==
Acidilobales species are widely distributed in hot springs with acidic environments, where they likely play a role in the complete oxidation of organic material. Based on the metabolic capacities predicted from the A. saccharovorans genome, Acidilobales are metabolically similar to the Thermoproteales, and the two orders may serve similar ecological roles in acidic and neutral hot springs, respectively.
