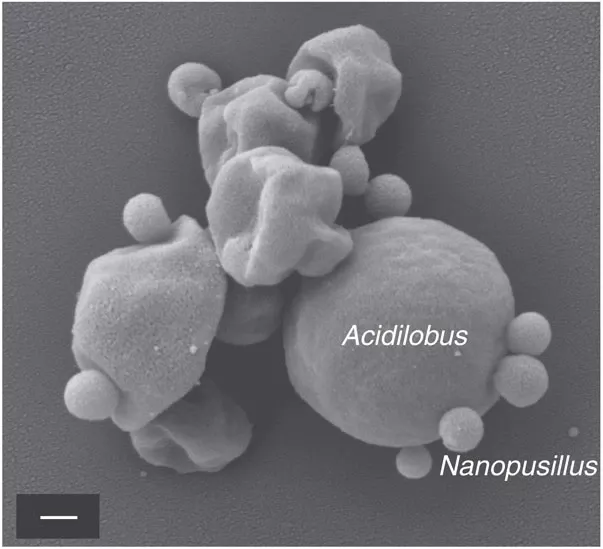

Scientific classification
- Domain: Archaea
- Clade: "Proteoarchaeota"
- Kingdom: Thermoproteati
- Phylum: Thermoproteota
- Class: Thermoprotei
- Order: Acidilobales; Prokofeva et al. 2009

Families
- Acidilobaceae; Caldisphaeraceae

= Acidilobales =

Order of archaea

Acidilobales are an order of archaea in the class Thermoprotei.

== Phylogeny ==
The currently accepted taxonomy is based on the List of Prokaryotic names with Standing in Nomenclature (LPSN) and National Center for Biotechnology Information (NCBI)

16S rRNA based LTP_06_2022

- - - - Fervidicoccales
        Fervidicoccaceae
    - - Desulfurococcales 2
        - "Ignicoccaceae"
        - - Desulfurococcaceae 2
            - - Stetteria
              - Thermodiscus
            - Aeropyrum
  - - Desulfurococcales
      - - "Ignisphaeraceae"
        - Pyrodictiaceae
      - - Desulfurococcaceae
        - - Caldisphaeraceae
            Caldisphaera
          - Acidilobaceae
            Acidilobus
    - Sulfolobales
      Sulfolobaceae

53 marker proteins based GTDB 08-RS214

- Sulfolobales
  - - Desulfurococcaceae
    - - Fervidicoccaceae
      - - Pyrodictiaceae
        - - "Ignicoccaceae"
          - - Acidilobaceae
              - Aeropyrum
              - - Caldisphaera
                - Acidilobus
  - - - "Ignisphaeraceae"
      - Zestosphaera {NBVN01}
    - Sulfolobaceae

== See also ==
- List of Archaea genera
