= Saccharolobus shibatae =

Scientific classification
- Domain: Archaea
- Kingdom: Thermoproteati
- Phylum: Thermoproteota
- Class: Thermoprotei
- Order: Sulfolobales
- Family: Sulfolobaceae
- Genus: Saccharolobus
- Species: S. shibatae

Binomial name
- Saccharolobus shibatae (Grogan et al. 1991) Sakai and Kurosawa 2018

Synonyms
- Sulfolobus shibatae Grogan et al. 1991

Species of archaeon

Saccharolobus shibatae is an archaeal species belongs to the phylum Thermoproteota. Saccharolobus shibatae was described for the first time as Sulfolobus shibatae in 1990, after being isolated from geothermal pools in Beppu, Japan. It was transferred from the genus Sulfolobus to the new genus Saccharolobus with the description of Saccharolobus caldissimus in 2018.

== Description ==
With a diameter between 0.7 and 1.5 μm, this organism thrives at a pH and temperature optima of 3.0 and 80 °C, respectively. Given the extreme conditions required for the growth of this microbe it is considered a thermoacidophile, as all organisms in the family Sulfolobaceae.

== Metabolism ==
This organism can grow in complex organic compounds and in sugars, and since it has not been yet determined if S. shibatae can grow autotrophically, this organism is either a heterotrophic or mixotrophic archaeon.
