= Thermosphaera =

Scientific classification
- Domain: Archaea
- Kingdom: Thermoproteati
- Phylum: Thermoproteota
- Class: Thermoprotei
- Order: Desulfurococcales
- Family: Desulfurococcaceae
- Genus: Thermosphaera; Huber et al. 1998

Type species
- Thermosphaera aggregans Huber et al. 1998

Species
- T. aggregans; "T. chiliense"

Genus of archaea

Thermosphaera is a genus of the Desulfurococcaceae. They are a group of prokaryotic organisms which have been discovered in extremely hot environments such as sulfur springs, volcanoes, and magma pools. Isolates of Thermosphaera were first identified in 1998 from the Obsidian Pool in Yellowstone National Park.

== Phylogeny ==
The currently accepted taxonomy is based on the List of Prokaryotic names with Standing in Nomenclature (LPSN) and National Center for Biotechnology Information (NCBI).

16S rRNA based LTP_07_2026

- Thermosphaera
  - T. aggregans

53 marker proteins based GTDB 11-RS232

- Thermosphaera
  - T. aggregans Huber et al. 1998
  - "T. chiliense" Chos, Elcheninov & Zayulina 2024

== Cell structure and metabolism ==
Cells of Thermosphaera are cocci (spherical) and form grape-like aggregates during the exponential growth phase. In the late exponential and stationary growth phases, smaller groups, including some single cells, were visible. Aggregates were shown to have several flagella; single cells could have as many as eight. The cell envelope is an amorphous layer covering a cytoplasmic membrane. Temperatures exceeding 92 °C inhibits growth, as does sulfur and hydrogen. Thermosphaera cells are heterotrophic, processing energy from yeast.

== Ecology ==
Thermosphaera are found mainly in sulfuric pools, where they thrive on the extreme temperatures. In terms of research and economic significance, learning more about these organisms and their properties may help advancements in biotechnology.

== Genome structure ==
Sequencing the 16S rRNA of Thermosphaera showed that this isolate was a member of the group Crenarchaeota and closely related to Staphylothermus and Desulfurococcus.

== See also ==
- List of Archaea genera
