= Acidilobus aceticus =

Scientific classification
- Domain: Archaea
- Clade: Proteoarchaeota
- Kingdom: Thermoproteati
- Phylum: Thermoproteota
- Class: Thermoprotei
- Order: Desulfurococcales
- Family: Acidilobaceae
- Genus: Acidilobus
- Species: A. aceticus

Binomial name
- Acidilobus aceticus Prokofeva et al., 2000

Species of archaeon

Acidilobus aceticus is a thermoacidophilic (that is, both thermophilic and acidophilic) species of anaerobic archaea. The species was originally described in 2000 after being isolated from hot springs in Kamchatka. It is the type species of the genus Acidilobus.

== Description ==
Acidilobus aceticus has a coccoid morphology of 1-2 μm diameter with a relatively thick S-layer. A. aceticus has an optimal growth temperature of 85°C (qualifying it as a hyperthermophile) and an optimal pH of 3.8. It is a non-motile obligate anaerobe with fermentative metabolism characterized by production of acetate under cell culture conditions tested; its name recognizes this property. Although its growth is accelerated by the presence of elemental sulfur, which is reduced to hydrogen sulfide, sulfur is not essential for growth. It is resistant to the antibiotics chloramphenicol, penicillin and streptomycin. A. aceticus differs from A. saccharovorans, the only other recognized species in the genus, in two major respects: it is non-motile whereas A. saccharovorans is flagellated; and it is capable of growth on a much narrower range of substrates.
