= Vulcanisaeta =

Scientific classification
- Domain: Archaea
- Kingdom: Thermoproteati
- Phylum: Thermoproteota
- Class: Thermoprotei
- Order: Thermoproteales
- Family: Thermoproteaceae
- Genus: Vulcanisaeta; Itoh, Suzuki & Nakase 2002

Type species
- Vulcanisaeta distributa Itoh, Suzuki & Nakase 2002

Species
- V. distributa; "V. moutnovskia"; V. souniana; V. thermophila

Genus of archaea

Vulcanisaeta is a genus of archaeans in the family Thermoproteaceae.

== Description and significance ==
Vulcanisaeta is an anaerobic, heterotrophic, hyperthermophilic archaeon that grows optimally at 85–90 °C and at pH 4.0–4.5. The organism is isolated from samples collected directly from solfataric fields or piped hot spring water in eastern Japan.

== Genome structure ==
Several Vulcanisaeta genomes have been sequenced, see List of sequenced archaeal genomes. The G + C content of its DNA, which is between 44 and 46%, is predicted to be relatively lower than other members of the Thermoproteaceae genera.

== Cell structure and metabolism ==
The cells of Vulcanisaeta are straight to slightly curved rods, which range from 0.4 to 0.6 μm in width. In some cases, the cells are branched or bear spherical bodies at the terminals. The archaeon utilizes maltose, starch, malate, yeast extract, peptone, beef extract, casamino acids and gelatin as carbon sources, cannot utilize D-arabinose, D-fructose, lactose, sucrose, D-xylose, acetate, butyrate, formate, fumarate, propionate, pyruvate, succinate, methanol, formamide, methylamine or trimethylamine. As electron acceptors, the organism uses sulfur and thiosulfate. Unlike some other genetically similar archaea such as Thermocladium or Caldivirga, Vulcanisaeta grows in the absence of vitamin mixture or archaeal cell-extract solution in the medium.

== Ecology ==
Strains of Vulcanisaeta were found in hot spring areas in Japan. Despite the organisms being the most common rod-shaped crenarchaeote among isolates from hot springs in Japan, it has not isolated from other countries. This contrasts with the genera Thermoproteus and Pyrobaculum, which are distributed worldwide, including the Azores, Iceland, Indonesia, Italy, Japan, the Philippines, Russia, and the United States. Therefore, it is possible that the genus Vulcanisaeta has a restricted distribution that includes Japan.

== Phylogeny ==
The currently accepted taxonomy is based on the List of Prokaryotic names with Standing in Nomenclature (LPSN) and National Center for Biotechnology Information (NCBI).

16S rRNA based LTP_07_2026

- Vulcanisaeta
  - V. thermophila
  - - V. distributa
    - V. souniana

53 marker proteins based GTDB 11-RS232

- Vulcanisaeta
  - V. thermophila Yim et al. 2015
  - - V. distributa Itoh, Suzuki & Nakase 2002
    - - "V. moutnovskia" Gumerov et al. 2011
      - V. souniana Itoh, Suzuki & Nakase 2002

== See also ==
- List of Archaea genera
