= Sulfophobococcus =

Scientific classification
- Domain: Archaea
- Kingdom: Thermoproteati
- Phylum: Thermoproteota
- Class: Thermoprotei
- Order: Desulfurococcales
- Family: Desulfurococcaceae
- Genus: Sulfophobococcus; Hensel et al. 1997
- Species: S. zilligii

Binomial name
- Sulfophobococcus zilligii Hensel et al. 1997

Genus of archaea

Sulfophobococcus is a genus of the Desulfurococcaceae.

== See also ==
- List of Archaea genera
