= Pyrobaculum aerophilum =

Scientific classification
- Domain: Archaea
- Kingdom: Thermoproteati
- Phylum: Thermoproteota
- Class: Thermoprotei
- Order: Thermoproteales
- Family: Thermoproteaceae
- Genus: Pyrobaculum
- Species: P. aerophilum

Binomial name
- Pyrobaculum aerophilum Völkl et al., 1993

Species of archaeon

Pyrobaculum aerophilum is a single-celled microorganism in the genus Pyrobaculum. The first Pyrobaculum species to be sequenced was P. aerophilum. It is a rod-shaped hyperthermophilic archaeum first isolated from a boiling marine water hole at Maronti Beach, Ischia. It forms characteristic terminal spherical bodies (so called "golf clubs") like Thermoproteus and Pyrobaculum. Its type strain is IM2; DSM 7523). Its optimum temperature for growth is around boiling point for water. Its optimum pH for growth is 7.0. Sulfur was found to inhibit its growth.

Its circular genome sequence is 2,222,430 Bp in length and contains 2605 protein-coding sequences (CDS). It is capable of aerobic respiration. Its name references this ability: aerophilum coming from the Greek: ἀήρ ("aero"), meaning air, and φιλο (philo), meaning loving. It produces colonies that are round and greyish yellow. It uses both organic and inorganic compounds during respiration.

Whole genome analysis demonstrated that it lacks 5' untranslated regions in its mRNAs. This implies that it does not employ the Shine-Delgarno sequence to initiate protein synthesis.
