= Caldococcus =

Scientific classification
- Domain: Archaea
- Kingdom: Thermoproteati
- Phylum: Thermoproteota
- Class: Thermoprotei
- Order: Desulfurococcales
- Family: Desulfurococcaceae
- Genus: Caldococcus; Aoshima et al. 1996

Type species
- Caldococcus litoralis Svetlichny et al. 1987

Species
- "C. litoralis"; "C. noboribetus"

Genus of archaea

Caldococcus is a genus of Archaea in the order Desulfurococcales.

== Characteristics ==
Caldococcus are a genus of Archaea found in the class Desulfurococcales. Members of the genus are strictly anaerobic, hyperthermophilic cocci that reduce sulfide and oxidize sulfur. They can be found in hyperthermal vents and hot springs such as those at Yellowstone National Park

== Species ==
=== Caldococcus noboribetus ===
==== Isocitrate Dehydrogenase Research ====
Caldococcus noboribetus genes have been mutated to understand the characteristics of the isocitrate dehydrogenase ancestral protein. The mutant isocitrate dehydrogenase genes contain inferred ancestral sequences that have been expressed in E. coli cells. Expression of these genes resulted in proteins with ancestral amino acid sequences, which provided evidence for relationships with a hyperthermophilic universal ancestor. Thermostabilities of the purified enzymes had greater thermal stabilities than wild-type isocitrate dehydrogenase. This supports a hypothesis that last universal common ancestor was thermophilic or hyperthermophilic. This finding has implications for understanding the evolutionary history of other proteins as well for engineering protein thermostability for experimental or industrial purposes.

A gene coding for isocitrate dehydrogenase (ICDH) was cloned from Caldococcus noboribetus and sequenced. An amino acid sequence of ICDH displayed similarities to bacterial ICDH genes found in both Vibrio and E. coli species. Sequences from the latter shared about 50% identity with the archaeal ICDH. The gene was expressed in E. coli by ligating it to a T7 promoter and the resulting molecular weight of the gene product was about 48,000. This estimate was consistent with an estimate from the deduced amino acid sequence. The gene product also displayed a NADP-dependency in order to function at 80 °C. The ICDH gene isolated from C. noboribetus demonstrated a higher thermostability than a host derived ICDH. From this information, it is plausible that this species could provide information regarding an ancestral hyperthermophile. Such information would help build a complete phylogenetic tree of hyperthermophilic archeabacteria.

==== Caldococcus litoralis ====
Caldococcus litoralis were published as a representative of a novel genus, based on a significant difference of 14% in the GC Content with Thermococcus celer, the only representative of Thermococcus known at the time the study was done in 1987. C. litoralis are irregularly shaped cocci, ranging from 0.7-2.1 μm in size. The species was isolated from hot volcanic vents at Hot Beach on the Kunashir Island, Japan It is a marine and extremely thermophilic archaebacterium capable of growth at 55-100 °C, with an optimum temperature of 88 °C. It is also capable of growth at pH values ranging from 5.9 -7.0 with an optimum at pH 6.4. Under optimal conditions, generation time is 44 minutes with 6 g of peptone per liter and elemental sulfur and an electron acceptor.

C. litoralis possesses monopolar filamentous bundles, and is strictly anaerobic. It utilizes peptides as a carbon and energy source; it grows in the presence of elemental sulfur, which it reduces to H_{2}S.

C litoralis is resistant to vancomycin, chloramphenicol, benzylpenicillin, streptomycin and rifampicin. Its RNA polymerase does not react with antibodies against Desulfurococcus RNA polymerase. It has a GC-content of 41.0 ± 0. 2 mol%. Due to its GC-content and its morphological and physiological properties, the original isolate was assigned to a new genus, Caldococcus gen. nov., with the type strain C. litoralis sp. nov.; the type strain is Z-1301.

It been suggested that C. litoralis be reclassified as Thermococcus litoralis Z-1301." T. litoralis is a more recently published species that was not known at the time the original study was performed. This suggestion is supported by immunoblotting analyses indicating that the two are the same species. Additional support includes 96% homology between the two strains following DNA-DNA hybridization.

== See also ==
- List of Archaea genera
