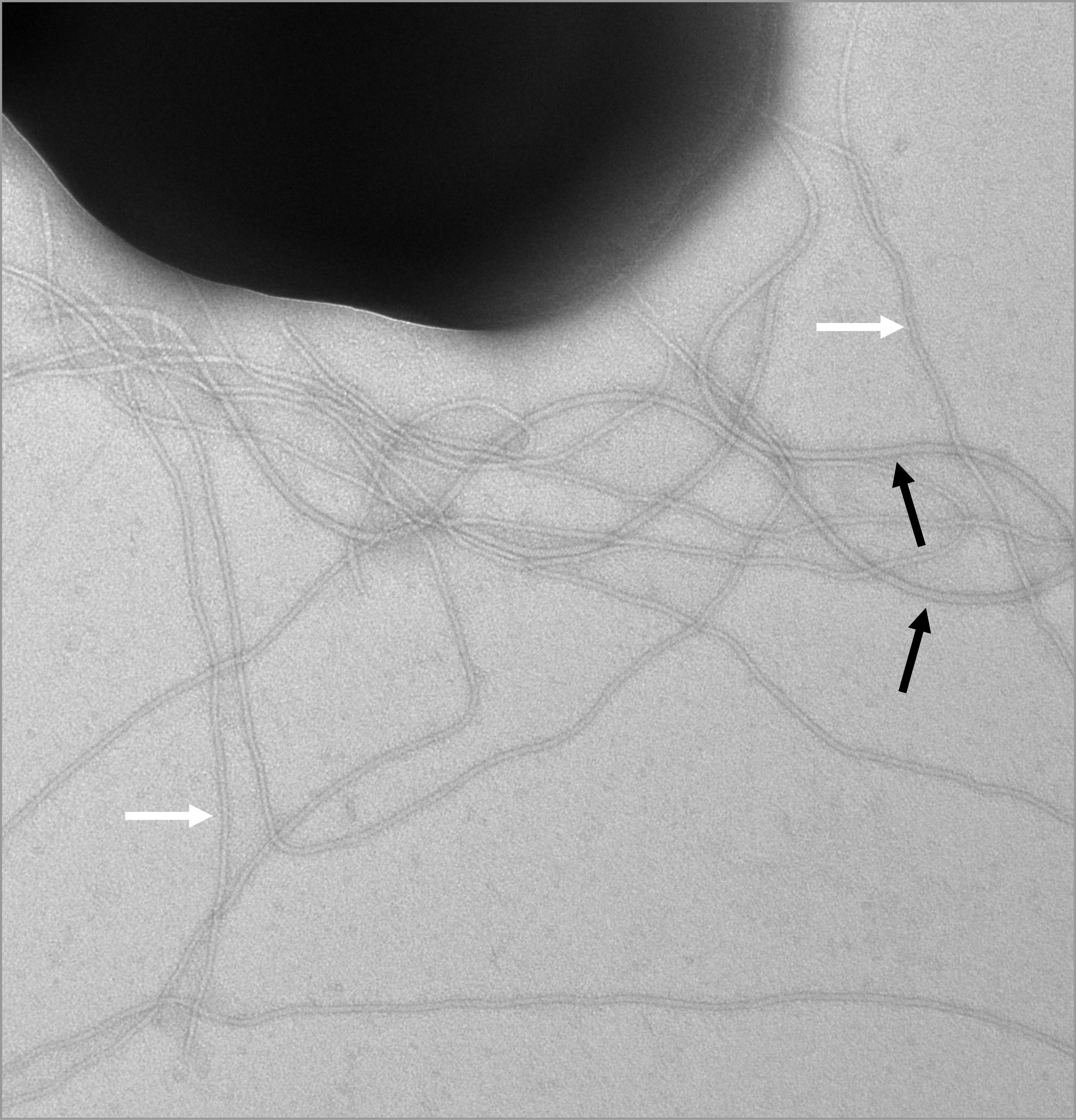
- Cell surface structures of Sulfolobus acidocaldarius, with white arrows pointing to fimbriae, and black arrows pointing to archaella.

Scientific classification
- Domain: Archaea
- Kingdom: Thermoproteati
- Phylum: Thermoproteota
- Class: Thermoprotei
- Order: Sulfolobales
- Family: Sulfolobaceae
- Genus: Sulfolobus
- Species: S. acidocaldarius

Binomial name
- Sulfolobus acidocaldarius Thomas D. Brock et al. 1972

= Sulfolobus acidocaldarius =

Species of archaeon

Sulfolobus acidocaldarius is a thermoacidophilic archaeon that belongs to the phylum Thermoproteota. S. acidocaldarius was the first Sulfolobus species to be described, in 1972 by Thomas D. Brock and collaborators. This species was found to grow optimally between 75 and 80 °C, with pH optimum in the range of 2-3.

== Isolation ==
Sulfolobus acidocaldarius was first isolated from thermal soils and hot springs with low pH in the United States of America (specifically in the Yellowstone National Park), in El Salvador, Dominica and Italy. The springs where this species was isolated had a pH less than 3 and temperatures in the range of 65-90 °C.

== Morphological description ==
Sulfolobus acidocaldarius is, as all Archaea, unicellular. Cells belonging to this species are spherical, albeit irregular, and usually possess lobes. The diameter of the cells fall in the range of 0.8-1 μm, with little size variation.

== Cell replication ==
Sulfolobus acidocaldarius possess a mechanism of replication homologous to the eukaryotic ESCRT.

== Metabolism ==
Sulfolobus acidocaldarius is a facultative autotroph. When growing autotrophically this organism oxidises sulfur to sulfate, while fixating carbon from carbon dioxide. The doubling time of cultures growing on sulfur alone falls between 36.8-55.3h. This species can also grow on complex organic substrates. When growing on 0.1% yeast extract the growth is faster, and the doubling times are between 6.5 and 8h.

== Genome ==
In 2005 the complete genome of Sulfolobus acidocaldarius strain DSM639 was published. The genome of this archaeon is composed of a single circular chromosome with 2,225,959 bp, with a G+C content of 36.7%. The authors predicted 2292 protein-coding genes. The genome of Sulfolobus acidocaldarius is very stable, with little, if any, rearrangements due to mobile elements.

The authors found the genes necessary for the synthesis of purines and pyrimidines, as well as for all amino acids except for selenocysteine. Genes for glucose metabolism suggest the existence of two alternative pathways. This Sulfolobus species grows on a limited range of carbon sources, relative to other Sulfolobus species, and this might be due to the lack of adequate transporters.

== The ups operon ==
UV-irradiation increases the frequency of recombination due to genetic exchange in S. acidocaldarius. The ups operon of Sulfolobus species is highly induced by UV irradiation. The pili encoded by this operon are employed in promoting cellular aggregation, which is necessary for subsequent DNA exchange between cells, resulting in homologous recombination. A study of the Sulfolobales acidocaldarius ups operon showed that one of the genes of the operon, saci-1497, encodes an endonuclease III that nicks UV-damaged DNA; and another gene of the operon, saci-1500, encodes a RecQ-like helicase that is able to unwind homologous recombination intermediates such as Holliday junctions. It was proposed that Saci-1497 and Saci-1500 function in an homologous recombination-based DNA repair mechanism that uses transferred DNA as a template. Thus it is thought that the ups system in combination with homologous recombination provide a DNA damage response which rescues Sulfolobales from DNA damaging threats.

== Significance ==
The thermostable restriction enzyme SuaI is obtained from this organism.
