= Thermocladium =

Scientific classification
- Domain: Archaea
- Kingdom: Thermoproteati
- Phylum: Thermoproteota
- Class: Thermoprotei
- Order: Thermoproteales
- Family: Thermoproteaceae
- Genus: Thermocladium; Itoh, Suzuki & Nakase 1998

Type species
- Thermocladium modestius Itoh, Suzuki & Nakase 1998

Species
- T. modestius

Genus of archaea

Thermocladium is a genus of archaeans in the family Thermoproteaceae. and National Center for Biotechnology Information (NCBI).

== See also ==
- List of Archaea genera
