= Staphylothermus =

Scientific classification
- Domain: Archaea
- Kingdom: Thermoproteati
- Phylum: Thermoproteota
- Class: Thermoprotei
- Order: Desulfurococcales
- Family: Desulfurococcaceae
- Genus: Staphylothermus; Stetter & Fiala 1986

Type species
- Staphylothermus marinus Stetter & Fiala 1986

Species
- S. hellenicus; S. marinus

Genus of archaea

Staphylothermus is a genus of archaeans in the family Desulfurococcaceae.

== Taxonomy ==
Desulfurococcaceae are anaerobic, sulfur respiring, extreme thermophiles. Desulfurococcaceae share the same family as Desulfurococcus. Two species of Staphylothermus have been identified: S. marinus and S. hellenicus. They are both heterotrophic, anaerobic members of the domain Archea.

== Cell structure ==
Staphylothermus marinus has a unique morphology. When nutrient levels are low, it forms grape-like clusters that range in diameter from 0.5–1.0 mm up to 100 clusters large. At high nutrient levels, large clustered cells up to 15 μm in diameter are found. The S-layer is made of a glycoprotein called tetrabrachion. Tetrabrachion is stable at high temperatures and resistant to chemicals that typically denature proteins. Tetrabrachion is built from 92,000 kDa polypeptides forming projections that react with other tetrabrachion sub units making a lattice framework that covers the cell. Tetrabrachion is resistant to heat and chemical denaturation. S. marinus has a circular chromosome with 1,610 protein-coding genes and 49 RNA genes. Staphylothermus hellenicus does not have tetrabrachion in the cell wall. It is an aggregated coccus, obligate anaerobe, heterotrophic, archeon that grows 0.8–1.3 μm in diameter. It forms large aggregates with up to 50 cells and has a circular chromosome that contains 158,0347 nucleotides, 1,599 protein-coding genes and 50 RNA genes.

== Metabolism ==
Staphylothermus marinus and Staphylothermus hellenicus have special enzymes called extremozymes known to work well in extremely hot or cold environments where most enzymatic reactions could not occur. Staphylothermus marinus and Staphylothermus hellenecus are thermophiles that have heat stable extremozymes that work at particularly high temperatures. Both organisms are sulfur dependent, extreme marine thermophiles. These archeons require sulfur for growth but can produce hydrogen if sulfur becomes limited. Staphylothermus marinus converts sulfur to hydrogen sulfide using these extremozymes. Hydrogen sulfide is then released as a waste product. Staphylothermus marinus contains large protein complexes that are involved in sulfur reduction. Staphylothermus marinus and Staphylothermus hellenicus use sulfur as the final electron acceptor but may use different membrane complexes in sulfur reduction. S. marinus lacks the genes for purine nucleotide biosynthesis and thus relies on environmental sources to meet its purine requirements.

== Ecology ==
Staphylothermus marinus and Staphylothermus hellenicus are classified as hyperthermophiles preferring temperatures between 65 and 85 °C. Thermophiles live in hot water environments such as hyperthermal vents. Staphylothermus marinus has been found in the heated geothermal sediments of “black smokers” on the ocean floor. The optimal growth temperature is 85–92 °C. Maximum growth temperature is 98 °C. It prefers a pH of 6.5, can grow in a pH of 4.5 to 8.5, and favors 1–3.5% NaCl concentrations. Staphylothermus hellenicus was isolated in shallow, hypothermal vents off the coast of Greece in 1996. It grows at an optimum temperature of 85 °C, pH 6 and 3–4% NaCl concentrations.

== Significance ==
Staphylothermus marinus and Staphylothermus hellenicus are very closely related and both could be used in biotechnology as heat-stable enzyme sources. The enzymes they contain are of the most stable known and most resistant to denaturing agents. Thermophile enzymes have been used in biotechnology to perform important procedures such as DNA polymerase chain reactions. These heat stable enzymes are also used in industrial products and processes such as biofuels and biodegradation. Biorefineries specifically use thermophiles and their enzymes to convert biomass into useful products. Thermophiles like Staphylothermus marinus and Staphylothermus hellenicus provide enzymes that are operable at high temperatures providing better mixing, less contamination, and better solubility. Many scientists believe that thermophiles are the oldest organisms on earth and may give scientists answers to the origin of life or whether life exists in other universes.

== See also ==
- List of Archaea genera

== Sources ==
- Arab H, Volker H, Thomm M (2000). "Thermococcus aegaeicus sp. nov. and Staphylothermus hellenicus sp. nov., two novel hyperthermophilic archaea isolated from geothermally heated vents off Palaeochori Bay, Milos, Greece". International Journal of Systematic and Evolutionary Biology. 50: 2101–2108.
- Bioinformatics Resource Portal. HAMAP hellinicus. Retrieved April 2, 2012.
- Joint Genome Institute. Staphylothermus hellenicus P8, DSM 12710 - Home.mht. Retrieved April 2, 2012.
