= Ignisphaera =

Scientific classification
- Domain: Archaea
- Kingdom: Thermoproteati
- Phylum: Thermoproteota
- Class: Thermoprotei
- Order: Desulfurococcales
- Family: Desulfurococcaceae
- Genus: Ignisphaera; Niederberger et al. 2006

Type species
- Ignisphaera aggregans Niederberger et al. 2006

Species
- I. aggregans; I. cupida

Genus of archaea

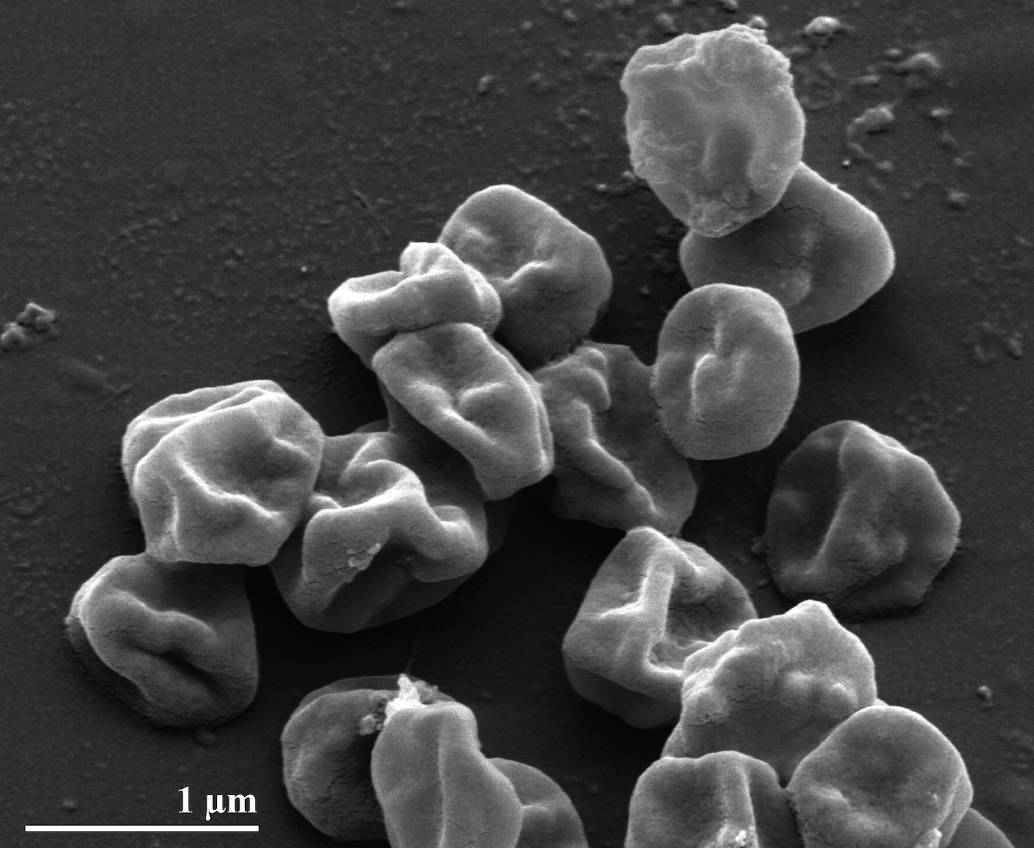
Scanning electron micrograph of Ignisphaera aggregans

Ignisphaera is a genus of the Desulfurococcales. Ignisphaera aggregans is a coccoid- shaped, fourth type strain that is strictly anaerobes with anaerobic respiration. This archaea species are hyperthermophiles that were found in New Zealand's hot springs in Kuirau Park, Rotorua.

== See also ==
- List of Archaea genera
