= Thermofilum =

Scientific classification
- Domain: Archaea
- Kingdom: Thermoproteati
- Phylum: Thermoproteota
- Class: Thermoprotei
- Order: Thermofilales
- Family: Thermofilaceae
- Genus: Thermofilum; Zillig & Gierl 1983

Type species
- Thermofilum pendens Zillig and Gierl 1983

Species
- T. adornatum; "T. carboxyditrophum"; "T. librum"; T. pendens

Genus of archaea

Thermofilum is a genus of archaea in the family Thermofilaceae.

Thermofilum pendens is a hyperthermic member of the archael kingdom Crenarchaeota, and represents a deep branch in the order Thermoproteales. T. pendens lacks the genes for purine nucleotide biosynthesis and thus relies on environmental sources to meet its purine requirements.

== Taxonomy ==
The currently accepted taxonomy is based on the List of Prokaryotic names with Standing in Nomenclature (LPSN) and National Center for Biotechnology Information (NCBI).

16S rRNA based LTP_07_2026

- Thermofilum
  - T. adornatum Zayulina et al. 2020
  - T. pendens Zillig & Gierl 1983

53 marker proteins based GTDB 11-RS232

- Thermofilum
  - T. adornatum
  - T. pendens

== See also ==
- List of Archaea genera
