= Aeropyrum =

Scientific classification
- Domain: Archaea
- Kingdom: Thermoproteati
- Phylum: Thermoproteota
- Class: Thermoprotei
- Order: Desulfurococcales
- Family: Desulfurococcaceae
- Genus: Aeropyrum; Sako et al. 1996

Type species
- Aeropyrum pernix Sako et al. 1996

Species
- A. camini; A. pernix

Genus of archaea

Aeropyrum is a genus of archaea in the family Desulfurococcaceae.

== Etymology ==
The name Aeropyrum derives from:
Greek noun aer, aeros (ἀήρ, ἀέρος), air; Greek neuter gender noun pur, fire; Neo-Latin neuter gender noun Aeropyrum, air fire, referring to the hyperthermophilic respirative character of the organism.

== Species ==
The genus contains 2 species (including basonyms and synonyms), namely

- A. camini Nakagawa et al. 2004 (Latin genitive case noun camini, of a chimney, relating to its isolation from a hydrothermal vent chimney.)
- A. pernix Sako et al. 1996 (Latin neuter gender adjective pernix, nimble, active, agile, indicating high motility in microscopic inspection.)

== Taxonomy ==
The currently accepted taxonomy is based on the List of Prokaryotic names with Standing in Nomenclature (LPSN) and National Center for Biotechnology Information (NCBI).

16S rRNA based LTP_07_2026

- Aeropyrum
  - A. camini Nakagawa et al. 2004
  - - A. pernix Sako et al. 1996
    - Stetteria hydrogenophila Jochimsen, Peinemann-Simon & Thomm 1998

53 marker proteins based GTDB 11-RS232

- Aeropyrum
  - A. camini Nakagawa et al. 2004
  - A. pernix Sako et al. 1996

== See also ==
- List of Archaea genera
