= Desulfurococcaceae =

Scientific classification
- Domain: Archaea
- Kingdom: Thermoproteati
- Phylum: Thermoproteota
- Class: Thermoprotei
- Order: Desulfurococcales
- Family: Desulfurococcaceae; Zillig & Stetter 1983

Genera
- Aeropyrum; "Caldococcus"; Desulfurococcus; Ignicoccus; Ignisphaera; Staphylothermus; Stetteria; Sulfophobococcus; Thermodiscus; Thermogladius; Thermosphaera; "Ca. Zestomicrobium"; Zestosphaera

Family of archaea

Desulfurococcaceae are a family of the disc-shaped anaerobic microorganisms belonging to the order Desulfurococcales, in the domain Archaea. Members of this family are distinguished from the other family (Pyrodictiaceae) in the order Desulfurococcales by having an optimal growth temperature below 100 °C, rather than above 100 °C, and by being more diverse. Several genera of the family have been identified.

== Phylogeny ==
The currently accepted taxonomy is based on the List of Prokaryotic names with Standing in Nomenclature (LPSN) and National Center for Biotechnology Information (NCBI).

16S rRNA based LTP_07_2026

- - Sulfolobales
    Sulfolobaceae
  - Desulfurococcales
    - - Ignisphaeraceae
        Ignisphaera
    - - Pyrodictiaceae
      - - - Fervidicoccaceae
          - - Acidilobaceae
              - Thermodiscus
              - - Caldisphaera
                - Acidilobus
        - - - Ignicoccaceae
              Ignicoccus
            - Desulfurococcaceae~1
              - Ignicoccus hospitalis
              - Aeropyrum [incl. Stetteria]
          - - - Desulfurococcaceae
                - Staphylothermus
                - - Thermogladius
                  - - Thermosphaera
                    - - Sulfophobococcus
                      - Desulfurococcus

53 marker proteins based GTDB 11-RS232

- Sulfolobales
  - - - Desulfurococcaceae
        - Staphylothermus
        - - Thermogladius
          - - Thermosphaera
            - Desulfurococcus
    - - Fervidicoccaceae
      - - - - Ignicoccaceae
              Ignicoccus
          - Pyrodictiaceae
        - - Acidilobaceae
            - "Ca. Tiamatella"
            - - "Ca. Calypsonella"
              - - - Aeropyrum
                  - Thermodiscus
                - - Caldisphaera
                  - Acidilobus
  - - - "Zestosphaeraceae"
        Zestosphaera
      - Ignisphaeraceae
        Ignisphaera
    - Sulfolobaceae

== See also ==
- List of Archaea genera
