= Thermofilaceae =

Scientific classification
- Domain: Archaea
- Kingdom: Thermoproteati
- Phylum: Thermoproteota
- Class: Thermoprotei
- Order: Thermofilales; Zayulina et al., 2021
- Family: Thermofilaceae; Burggraf, Huber & Stetter, 1997

Genera
- Infirmifilum; Thermofilum

Family of archaea

Thermofilaceae are a family of archaea in the order Thermofilales.

== Taxonomy ==
Taxonomy from List of Prokaryotic names with Standing in Nomenclature (LPSN) and National Center for Biotechnology Information (NCBI).

16S rRNA based LTP_07_2026

- - Infirmifilum
    - I. lucidum Zayulina et al. 2024
    - I. uzonense (Toshchakov et al. 2016) Zayulina et al. 2024
  - Thermofilum
    - T. adornatum Zayulina et al. 2020
    - T. pendens Zillig & Gierl 1983

53 marker proteins based GTDB 11-RS232

- - Infirmifilum
    - I. lucidum
    - I. uzonense
  - Thermofilum
    - T. adornatum
    - T. pendens

== See also ==
- List of Archaea genera
