= Caldivirga =

Scientific classification
- Domain: Archaea
- Kingdom: Thermoproteati
- Phylum: Thermoproteota
- Class: Thermoprotei
- Order: Thermoproteales
- Family: Thermoproteaceae
- Genus: Caldivirga; Itoh, Suzuki, Sanchez & Nakase, 1999

Type species
- Caldivirga maquilingensis Itoh et al. 1999

Species
- C. maquilingensis

Genus of archaea

Caldivirga is a genus of archaeans in the family Thermoproteaceae.

== See also ==
- List of Archaea genera
