= Thermodiscus =

Scientific classification
- Domain: Archaea
- Kingdom: Thermoproteati
- Phylum: Thermoproteota
- Class: Thermoprotei
- Order: Desulfurococcales
- Family: Desulfurococcaceae
- Genus: Thermodiscus; Stetter 2003

Type species
- Thermodiscus maritimus Stetter 2003

Species
- "Ca. T. eudorianus"; T. maritimus

Genus of archaea

Thermodiscus is a genus of archaea in the family Desulfurococcaceae. The only species is Thermodiscus maritimus.

== Taxonomy ==
The currently accepted taxonomy is based on the List of Prokaryotic names with Standing in Nomenclature (LPSN) and National Center for Biotechnology Information (NCBI).

16S rRNA based LTP_07_2026	53 marker proteins based GTDB 11-RS232
Thermodiscus; T. maritimus Stetter 2003	Thermodiscus; "Ca. T. eudorianus" St-John & Reysenbach 2024

== See also ==
- List of Archaea genera
