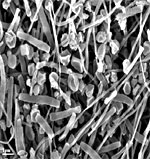
- Scanning electron micrograph of the Obsidian Pool enrichment culture, showing Korarchaeia.

Scientific classification (Candidatus)
- Domain: Archaea
- Kingdom: Thermoproteati
- Phylum: Thermoproteota
- Class: "Candidatus Korarchaeia"; Rinke et al. 2021

Orders
- Korarchaeales

Synonyms
- Korarchaea; Korarchaeota

= Korarchaeia =

"Candidatus Korarchaeia" Temporal range: Neoarchean–Present

Class of Archaea

"Candidatus Korarchaeia" is a class of Archaea under the phylum Thermoproteota. The name is derived from the Greek noun koros or kore, meaning "young man" or "young woman", and the Greek adjective archaios which means "ancient". It was previously designated as phylum Korarchaeota and as kingdom with various names like Crenarchaeida or Proteoarchaeota.

== Taxonomy ==
"Candidatus Korarchaeia" had been designated as Korarchaeota in the domain, Archaea. They are thought to have diverged relatively early in the genesis of Archaea and are among the deep-branching lineages. They have been classified as phylum (and sometimes as kingdom) Korarchaeota, along with Thaumarchaeota, Aigarchaeota, Crenarchaeota, under the kingdom Thermoproteati. The evolutionary link between Promethearchaeati and Thermoproteati.

The first member of "Candidatus Korarchaeia" to have its genome reconstructed was Korarchaeum cryptofilum, which was found in a hot spring, Obsidian Pool, in Yellowstone National Park and described in 2008. Since then only a few Korarchaeal genomes have been described. To check for "Candidatus Korarchaeia", samples from a variety of hot springs in Iceland and Kamchatka were gathered. According to the samples and analysis, the Icelandic samples contained about 87 distinct 16S ribosomal nucleic acid sequences, whereas the Kamchatkan samples contained about 33.

Based on protein sequences and phylogenetic analysis of conserved single genes, the "Candidatus Korarchaeia" was identified as a "deep archaeal lineage" with a possible relationship to the Crenarchaeota. Furthermore, given the known genetic makeup of archaea, the "Candidatus Korarchaeia" may have preserved a set of biological traits that correspond to the earliest known archaeal form.

Analysis of their 16S rRNA gene sequences suggests that they are a deeply branching lineage that does not belong to the main archaeal groups, Thermoproteota and Euryarchaeota. Analysis of the genome of one "Candidatus Korarchaeia" that was enriched from a mixed culture revealed a number of both Crenarchaeota- and Euryarchaeota-like features and supports the hypothesis of a deep-branching ancestry.

=== Revision ===
In 2001, George M. Garrity and John G. Holt described the phylum Crenarchaeota to include a single class Thermoprotei. With the growing number of prokaryotic taxa and the inconsistent nomenclature and classification, there was a need to revise the overall classification of archaea. In 2014, French taxonomists led by David Moreira designated "TACK", generally considered as a superphylum, into a single kingdom named Proteoarchaeota. However, such revision was not valid under the rules of the International Committee on Systematics of Prokaryotes (ICSP). In 2021, a team of Australian scientists led by Christian Rinke and Philip Hugenholtz published a new classification on archaea in which their genetic evidence indicated Thermoproteati archaea belong to a unified phylum Thermoproteota, which could be divided into the classes "Candidatus Korarchaeia", Thermoprotei, Methanomethylicia (former phylum Ca. Verstraetearchaeota), Bathyarchaeia and Nitrososphaeria (former phylum Ca. Thaumachaeota). The List of Prokaryotic names with Standing in Nomenclature (LPSN), an authority on maintenance and cataloguing prokaryotic taxons, upheld this classification of "Candidatus Korarchaeia" as a "preferred name" as a class.

In 2022, the ICSP revised its International Code of Nomenclature of Prokaryotes (ICNP, Prokaryotic Code). Following the revised code, Markus Göker and Aharon Oren (leaders of the ICSP), revised the domain and kingdom classifications 2024 in which the traditionally named "TACK" group was renamed to kingdom Thermoproteati. In this way, previous designations such as phylum Korarchaeota or kingdom Proteoarchaeota are invalidated.

== Species ==
The currently accepted taxonomy is based on the List of Prokaryotic names with Standing in Nomenclature (LPSN) and National Center for Biotechnology Information (NCBI).

Phylogeny of "Candidatus Korarchaeia"

- "Ca. Korarchaeia"
  - "Korarchaeales"
    - "Korarchaeaceae"
      - "Ca. Korarchaeum cryptofilum"
      - "Ca. Methanodesulfokores washburnensis"

Listed below are the known species of "Candidatus Korarchaeia":

- Order Korarchaeales Petitjean et al. 2015
  - Family Korarchaeaceae Rinke et al. 2020
    - Genus "Candidatus Korarchaeum" Elkins et al. 2008
      - Species "Ca. Korarchaeum cryptofilum" Elkins et al. 2008
        - "Ca. Korarchaeum cryptofilum" OPF8
    - Genus "Ca. Methanodesulfokores" corrig. McKay et al. 2019
      - Species "Ca. Methanodesulfokores washburnensis" corrig. McKay et al. 2019
    - Genus "Ca. Korarchaeota"
    - Genus "Ca. Korarchaeota archaeon" NZ13-K
    - Genus Korarchaeote SRI-306
    - Genus environmental samples
      - uncultured korarchaeote pBA5
      - uncultured korarchaeote pJP27
      - uncultured korarchaeote pJP78

== Reference species ==
A strain of Korarchaeum cryptofilum was cultivated from an enrichment culture from a hot spring in Yellowstone National Park, USA and described in 2008. The cells are long and needle-shaped, which gave the species its name, alluding to its "cryptical filaments". This organism lacks the genes for purine nucleotide biosynthesis and thus relies on environmental sources to meet its purine requirements.

== Characteristics ==
"Candidatus Korarchaeia" exhibit characteristics such as having a cell wall without peptidoglycan, as well as lipid membranes that are ether-linked. They have a surface layer of paracrystalline protein. This surface layer, known as the S-layer, is densely packed and consists of 1-2 proteins form various lattice structures and are most likely what maintains the cells' structural integrity. They are typically rod-shaped, however, it has been found that this morphology can change to be thicker-shaped in the presence of higher sodium dodecyl sulfate (SDS) concentrations. The cells have an ultrathin filamentous morphology that may vary in length. They typically average 15 μm in length and 0.16 μm in diameter but can be seen up to 100 μm long. Some Archaea can fix carbon dioxide through the 3-hydroxypropionate/4-hydroxybutyrate pathway into organic compounds

== Ecology ==
"Candidatus Korarchaeia" have only been found in hydrothermal environments ranging from terrestrial, including hot springs to marine, including shallow hydrothermal vents and deep-sea hydrothermal vents. Previous research has shown greater diversity of "Candidatus Korarchaeia" found in terrestrial hot springs compared to marine environments. "Candidatus Korarchaeia" have been found in nature in only low abundances. Korarcheota likely originated in marine environments and then adapted to terrestrial ones.

Geographically, "Candidatus Korarchaeia" have been found in a variety of locations around the world including Japan, Yellowstone National Park, the Gulf of California, Iceland and Russia.

"Candidatus Korarchaeia" are thermophiles, having been found living in conditions of up to 128 degrees Celsius. The lowest temperature they have been found in is 52 degrees Celsius. While they have frequently been observed living in acidic conditions, they have also been found living in conditions up to a pH of 10.

Researchers have identified a virus that can potentially infect "Candidatus Korarchaeia".

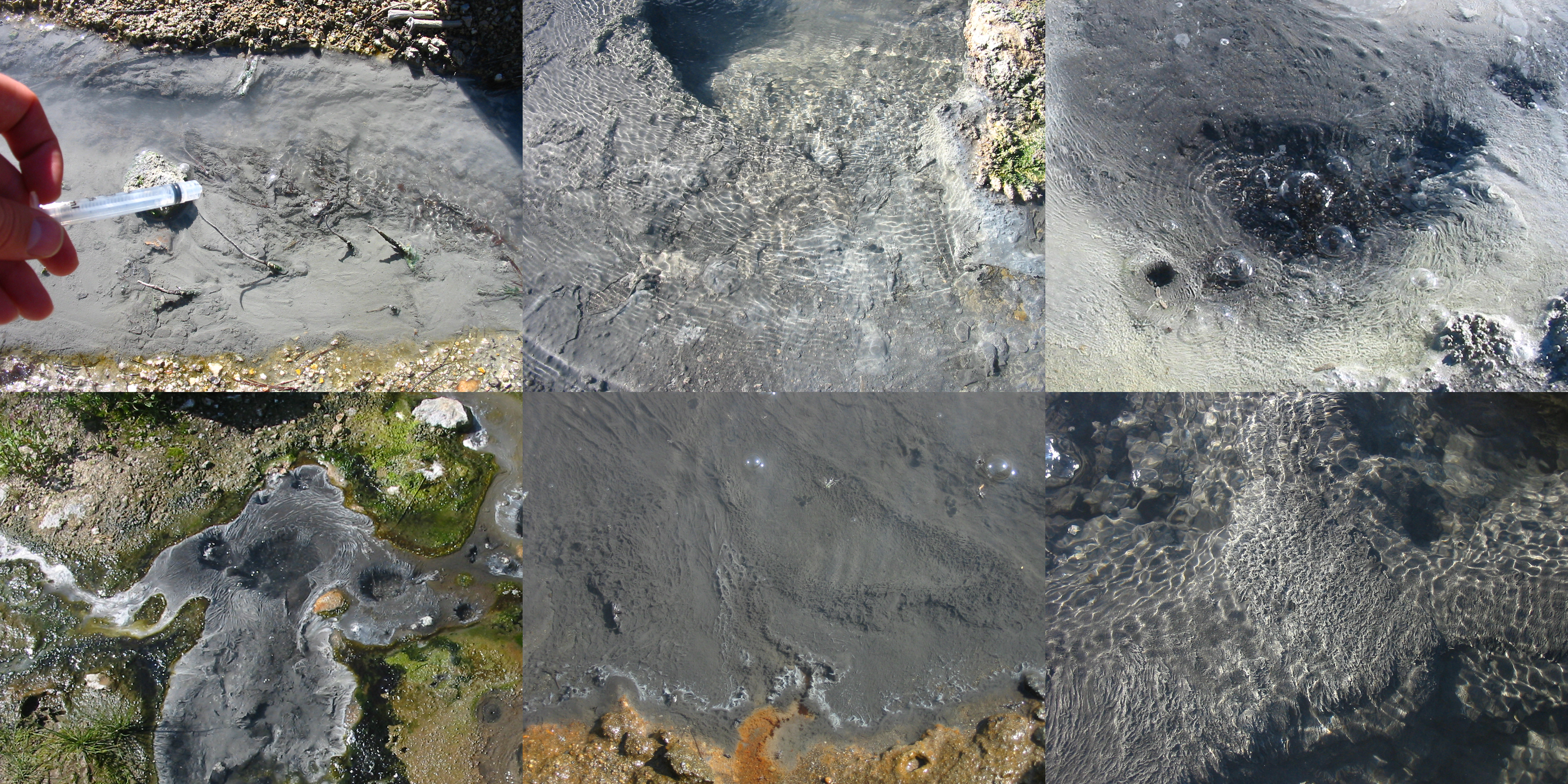
Each of these six hot springs (clockwise from top left: Uzon4, Uzon7, Uzon8, Uzon9, Mut11, Mut13) in Kamchatka was found to contain "Candidatus Korarchaeia".

== See also ==
- List of Archaea genera
