= O-phosphoserine sulfhydrylase =

Class of enzymes

Identifiers
- EC no.: 2.5.1.65

Databases
- IntEnz: IntEnz view
- BRENDA: BRENDA entry
- ExPASy: NiceZyme view
- KEGG: KEGG entry
- MetaCyc: metabolic pathway
- PRIAM: profile
- PDB structures: RCSB PDB PDBe PDBsum
Search
- PMC: articles
- PubMed: articles
- NCBI: proteins

O-phosphoserine sulfhydrylase (EC 2.5.1.65) is an enzyme that catalyzes the chemical reaction

phosphoserine
H_{2}S
P_{i}
cysteine

The two substrates of this enzyme characterised from Aeropyrum pernix are phosphoserine and hydrogen sulfide (H_{2}S). Its products are cysteine and orthophosphate (P_{i}). The enzyme can also use O-acetylserine as a source of the 2-amino-2-carboxyethyl group that is transferred, giving acetic acid as a byproduct.

This enzyme is a transferase, specifically those transferring aryl or alkyl groups other than methyl groups. The systematic name of this enzyme class is O-phospho-L-serine:hydrogen-sulfide 2-amino-2-carboxyethyltransferase. This enzyme is also called O-phosphoserine(thiol)-lyase.

== See also ==
- Cysteine synthase, which produces cysteine from O-acetylserine but not phosphoserine
