= Aeropyrum pernix =

Scientific classification
- Domain: Archaea
- Kingdom: Thermoproteati
- Phylum: Thermoproteota
- Class: Thermoprotei
- Order: Desulfurococcales
- Family: Desulfurococcaceae
- Genus: Aeropyrum
- Species: A. pernix

Binomial name
- Aeropyrum pernix Sako et al. 1996

Species of archaeon

Aeropyrum pernix is a species of extremophile archaea in the archaeal phylum Thermoproteota. It is an obligatorily thermophilic species. The first specimens were isolated from sediments in the sea off the coast of Japan.

== Discovery ==
Aeropyrum pernix was the first strictly aerobic hyperthermophilic Archaea to be discovered. It was originally isolated from heated marine sediments and venting water collected in 1996 from a solfataric vent at Kodakara-jima island in Kyūshū, Japan.

== Genome structure ==
Its complete genome was sequenced in 1999 and is 1,669 kilobases in size, with 2,694 possible genes detected. All of the genes in the TCA cycle were found except for that of α-ketoglutarate dehydrogenase. In its place, the genes coding for the two subunits of 2-oxoacid:ferredoxin oxidoreductase were identified.

== Properties ==
The cells of Aeropyrum pernix are spherical in shape and approximately 1 μm in diameter. The envelope surrounding the cells of Aeropyrum is about 25 nm wide. The organisms grows at temperature between 70 and 100 °C (optimum, 90 to 95 °C), at pH 5 to 9 (optimum, pH 7), and at a salinity of 1.8 to 7% (optimum, 3.5% salinity). The growth of the organisms is not detected at 68 or 102 °C. Below 1.5% salinity, cells lyse by low osmotic shock. The cells of the organisms are sensitive to chloramphenicol and insensitive to ampicillin, vancomycin, and cycloserine. It grows well on proteinaceous substances, with a doubling time under these conditions of about 200 minutes. This species lacks the genes for purine nucleotide biosynthesis and thus relies on environmental sources to meet its purine requirements.
