= C. lagunensis =

C. lagunensis may refer to:

- Caldisphaera lagunensis, an acidilobale in the family Caldisphaeraceae
- Canna lagunensis, a garden plant
- Cicindela lagunensis, a tiger beetle
