= Fervidicoccus =

Scientific classification
- Domain: Archaea
- Kingdom: Thermoproteati
- Phylum: Thermoproteota
- Class: Thermoprotei
- Order: Fervidicoccales; Perevalova et al., 2010
- Family: Fervidicoccaceae; Perevalova et al., 2010
- Genus: Fervidicoccus; Perevalova et al., 2010
- Species: F. fontis

Binomial name
- Fervidicoccus fontis Perevalova et al., 2010

Genus of archaeaon

Fervidicoccus fontis is an extremophilic, coccus-shaped archaeaon known for thriving in high-temperature environments. It was discovered in Russia's Uzon Caldera and exhibits anaerobic, organotrophic metabolism, primarily fermenting organic compounds such as peptides and yeast extract. F. fontis is genetically distinct, sharing no more than 89% of its genetic material with its closest relatives. It is the sole species within the order Fervidicoccales and genus Fervidicoccus, although ongoing research suggests potential new species. It plays a significant role in biotechnological applications due to its lipid-hydrolyzing capabilities, contributing to industries ranging from wastewater treatment to pharmaceuticals.

== Scientific Classification ==
=== Taxonomy ===
F. fontis belongs to the Archaea domain and falls within the Crenarchaeota phylum. Organisms within this phylum are known for their extremophilic nature, enabling them to survive in severe environments such as extreme heat, cold, or acidity. The class Thermoprotei includes thermophiles, among which F. fontis is a notable example. Thermophiles are characterized by their ability to survive in environments with high temperatures, with optimal growth at a temperature range of 65–70 °C (149–158 °F). Typically, thermophilic organisms are found in terrestrial and marine springs situated in volcanic areas or close to hydrothermal vents. F. fontis is classified within the order Fervidicoccales, the family Fervidicoccaceae, and the genus Fervidicoccus. The strains Kam940^{T} and 1507b were isolated and used to identify the organism, leading to the creation of a new genus and species. Currently, F. fontis is the only species identified within the order Fervidicoccales. However, strain Kam1884, isolated from Uzon Caldera, displays about 96% similarity in the 16S RNA sequence to F. fontis Kam940^{T}, indicating a possible new species within the Fervidicoccus genus.

=== Relatives ===
Phylogenetic trees were constructed to explore the evolutionary relationships of F. fontis, revealing its unique phylogenetic position while also illustrating its proximity to certain other species. This analysis combined sequencing data from 30 ribosomal proteins, the alpha and beta components of RNA polymerase, and 23S rRNA genes. F. fontis is genetically distinct within the Thermoprotei class, sharing less than 89% genetic identity with its members, which establishes it as the only known species within the Fervidicoccales order. This distinctness underscores its relatively distant evolutionary connections within the Thermoprotei class. However, notable relatives include Ignisphaera aggregans, Caldisphaera lagunensis, Acidilobus saccharovorans, and Desulfurococcus kamchatkensis. F. fontis is distinguished from its relatives due to its unique set of traits, including at least 25% unique protein-encoding genes and an absence of extracellular hydrolases, with the exception of proteases.

== Discovery and isolation ==
The discovery of F. fontis was initiated through a prepared anaerobic basal medium, aimed at fostering the growth of microorganisms in extreme environments. Samples were collected from thermal springs within Russia's Uzon Caldera. The medium in which the samples were obtained had a pH adjusted to 6.0-6.5 and included 1 mg of resazurin, 1mL of trace element and vitamin solutions, and 0.2 g of yeast extract. This was then transferred into tubes which were sealed with butyl rubber stoppers to maintain an anaerobic environment of 80% N_{2} and 20% CO_{2}. The method for isolating strains Kam940^{T} and Kam 1507b involved the incubation of a 10% inoculum, sourced from a blend of sediment and water at 70 °C (158 °F). This incubation also included the addition of chitin or β-keratin as polymeric substrates at a 2 g l^{−1} concentration. Kam940^{T} was isolated in a basal medium with peptone with 1.5% agar, whereas Kam1507b was obtained through serial dilution in a medium enriched with peptone. Within 3–5 days, this approach successfully isolated organisms with coccoid cells, marking the discovery of unique Fervidicoccus strains: Kam940^{T} and Kam1507b. The purity of these isolated strains was confirmed through phase-contrast microscopy, which revealed that the strains consisted entirely of single cocci cells, ultimately demonstrating effective isolation and the discovery of a new species.

== Morphology ==
F. fontis is characterized by its coccus-shaped cellular morphology and lack of motility due to its absence of a flagellum. Its cell envelope consists of a cell membrane formed by a layer of protein subunits. The dimensions of these cells can vary, with their lengths and widths ranging between 1-3 μm.

== Metabolism ==
F. fontis, an obligate anaerobic organotroph, primarily derives its energy from the fermentation of various organic compounds. It uses metabolites such as beef extract, peptone, and yeast extract for fermentation purposes, growing to densities greater than 10^{7} cells mL^{−1}. F. fontis shows optimal growth when cultivated with peptides and 20 mg/L yeast extract between 65 °C and 70 °C and a pH of 5.5-6.0. Additionally, F. fontis is capable of reducing sulfur to H_{2}S. The genome of F. fontis encodes 45 peptidases that facilitate protein and peptide hydrolysis as well as amino acid catabolism, which are essential processes for the transport of oligopeptides and free amino acids into cells. Pyruvate catabolism is also assumed to be present as an intermediate product from alanine metabolism. Pyruvate-ferredoxin oxidoreductase facilitates the production of acetyl-CoA, CO_{2}, and reduced ferredoxin. Subsequently, acetyl-CoA is transformed into acetate, generating ATP in a reaction carried out by acetyl-CoA synthetases. Despite its metabolic versatility, F. fontis lacks complete pathways for carbohydrate catabolism. This is evidenced by the lack of genes typically found in organisms capable of breaking down carbohydrates, such as glycoside hydrolases, polysaccharide lyases, or carbohydrate esterases.

== Genomics ==
The chromosome of F. fontis is circular, as determined through comprehensive genome sequencing and analysis, and confirmed by polymerase chain reaction (PCR) verification of regions with insertion sequence elements. It consists of 1,319,216 base pairs with a 37.5% average of G and C content. Its genome includes a duplicate of the 16S-23S rRNA operon, as well as a distinct 5S rRNA gene. Across the genome, there are 42 tRNA genes, nine of which include introns. Through similarity searches and coding potential predictions, 1,385 potential protein-coding genes were identified, with an average length of 829 nucleotides per gene. This ultimately resulted in an 87.1% protein-coding genes coverage of the entire F. fontis genome.

== Ecology ==
The F. fontis Kam940^{T} and Kam1507b strains were derived from areas with temperatures ranging from 75 and 80 °C (167 and 176 °F) and pH levels of 6.5 and 6.3, respectively. Further analysis using Denaturing gradient gel electrophoresis (DGGE) identified Fervidicoccaceae in enrichment cultures from Uzon Caldera, demonstrating their ability to grow at high temperatures (68–77 °C (154–171 °F)) and a pH range of 6.4–7.0 on various polymeric substrates. Sampling of environmental DNA uncovered the presence of Fervidicoccaceae in various hot springs around the world. These findings show that the 16S ribosomal RNA sequences of these organisms share a 94-95% 16S similarity to that of F. fontis, indicating F. fontis's widespread distribution and ecological adaptability.

== Significance ==
The demand for new lipases and lipid-consuming microorganisms is growing, presenting a challenge for biotechnology and microbiology. F. fontis has the capability to hydrolyze lipid substrates; therefore, it finds application in various industries such as wastewater treatment, the creation of refined products like pharmaceuticals, esters, and amino acids, as well as in the manufacture of biodiesel, biopolymers, cleaning products, cosmetics, paper, leather, and food products. The difficulty in isolating and sustaining pure archaeal cultures has constrained scientific knowledge of these microorganisms, as previously, only Thermococcus sibiricus was recognized for its lipid growth capabilities. Therefore, this new finding broadens the understanding of the ecological capabilities of the Fervidicoccus genus. F. fontis, with its small genome size compared to many other free-living thermophiles, may share ecological niches with other thermophilic bacteria and outcompete them, suggesting that it may be advantageous in competitive environments. F. fontis may also have antioxidant capabilities due to the presence of superoxide reductase, which can reduce oxidative damage and potentially decrease disease risk, highlighting its medical importance. The presence of a superoxide reductase gene in F. fontis highlights its function in superoxide detoxification, further contributing to antioxidant defense mechanisms.
