= Stetteria =

Scientific classification
- Domain: Archaea
- Kingdom: Thermoproteati
- Phylum: Thermoproteota
- Class: Thermoprotei
- Order: Desulfurococcales
- Family: Acidilobaceae
- Genus: Stetteria; Jochimsen et al. 1998

Type species
- Stetteria hydrogenophila Jochimsen et al. 1998

Species
- S. hydrogenophila

Genus of archaea

Stetteria is a genus of archaeans in the family Desulfurococcaceae. Up to now there is only one species of this genus known, Stetteria hydrogenophila.

== See also ==
- List of Archaea genera
