= Pyrobaculum =

Scientific classification
- Domain: Archaea
- Kingdom: Thermoproteati
- Phylum: Thermoproteota
- Class: Thermoprotei
- Order: Thermoproteales
- Family: Thermoproteaceae
- Genus: Pyrobaculum; Huber, Kristjansson & Stetter 1988

Type species
- Pyrobaculum islandicum Huber, Kristjansson & Stetter 1988

Species
- P. aerophilum; P. arsenaticum; P. calidifontis; P. ferrireducens; P. igneiluti; P. islandicum; P. neutrophilum; P. oguniense; P. organotrophum

Genus of archaea

Pyrobaculum is a genus of archaeans in the family Thermoproteaceae.

== Description and significance ==
As its Latin name Pyrobaculum (the "fire stick") suggests, the archaeon is rod-shaped and isolated from locations with high temperatures. It is Gram-negative and its cells are surrounded by an S-layer of protein subunits.

P. aerophilum is a hyperthermophilic and metabolically versatile organism. Different from other hyperthermophiles, it can live in the presence of oxygen and grows efficiently in microaerobic conditions.

Pyrobaculum yellowstonensis strain WP30 was obtained from an elemental sulfur sediment (Joseph's Coat Hot Spring [JCHS], 80 °C, pH 6.1, 135 μM As) in Yellowstone National Park (YNP), USA and is a chemoorganoheterotroph and requires elemental sulfur and/or arsenate as an electron acceptor. Growth in the presence of elemental sulfur and arsenate resulted in the formation of thioarsenates and polysulfides. The complete genome of this organism was sequenced (1.99 Mb, 58% G+C content), revealing numerous metabolic pathways for the degradation of carbohydrates, amino acids, and lipids. Multiple dimethyl sulfoxide-molybdopterin (DMSO-MPT) oxidoreductase genes, which are implicated in the reduction of sulfur and arsenic, were identified. Pathways for the de novo synthesis of nearly all required cofactors and metabolites were identified. The comparative genomics of P. yellowstonensis and the assembled metagenome sequence from JCHS showed that this organism is highly related (~95% average nucleotide sequence identity) to in situ populations. The physiological attributes and metabolic capabilities of P. yellowstonensis provide an important foundation for developing an understanding of the distribution and function of these populations in YNP.

== Genome structure ==
The first Pyrobaculum species to be sequenced was P. aerophilum. Its circular genome sequence is 2,222,430 Bp in length and contains 2605 protein-encoding sequences (CDS).

== Cell structure and metabolism ==
Under anaerobic conditions, the archaeon reduces nitrate to molecular nitrogen via the denitrification pathway. Most species grow either chemolithoautotrophically by sulfur reduction or organotrophically by sulfur respiration or by fermentation. Cells are rod-shaped with almost rectangular ends and are about 1.5–8 * 0.5–0.6 μm. Pyrobaculum is motile because of peritrichous or bipolar polytrichous flagellation, and its colonies are round and grey to greenish black. The species are either facultatively aerobic or strictly anaerobic. The growth was observed on yeast extract, peptone, extract of meat, but not on galactose, glucose, maltose, starch glycogen, ethanol, methanol, formamide, formate, malate, propionate, lactate, acetate, and casamino acids.

The first of the Pyrobaculum species to be genetically sequenced, P. aerophilum (rod-shaped, 3–8 * 0.6 μm), has a rare characteristic for an archaeon because it is capable of aerobic respiration (aerophilum = "air-loving"). This is evident from the fact that the archaeon grew only in the presence of oxygen when nitrate was absent. It produces colonies that are round and greyish yellow. It utilizes both organic (maximal cell densities were observed with complex organics such as yeast extract, meat extract, tryptone, and peptone as substrates) and inorganic compounds during aerobic and anaerobic respiration. Also, use of elemental sulphur for growth was observed. Further, P. aerophilum grows between 75 and 104 °C with an optimal growth temperature at 100 °C.

In stationary phase cultures, Pyrobaculum calidifontis cells were observed to aggregate. The aggregation is likely to be mediated by archaeal bundling pili (ABP), which assemble into highly ordered bipolar bundles. The bipolar nature of these bundles most likely arises from the association of filaments from at least two or more different cells. The component protein, AbpA, shows homology, both at the sequence and structural level, to the bacterial protein TasA, a major component of the extracellular matrix in bacterial biofilms, contributing to biofilm stability.

== Ecology ==
To this date, the strains of Pyrobaculum have been isolated from neutral to slightly alkaline boiling solfataric waters and shallow marine hydrothermal systems. P. aerophilum was isolated from a boiling marine water hole at Maronti Beach, Ischia, Italy. Further studies show that P. aerophilum grows under strictly anaerobic conditions with nitrate as the electron acceptor.

== Phylogeny ==
The currently accepted taxonomy is based on the List of Prokaryotic names with Standing in Nomenclature (LPSN) and National Center for Biotechnology Information (NCBI).

16S rRNA based LTP_07_2026

- Pyrobaculum
  - - P. islandicum Huber, Kristjansson & Stetter 1988
    - P. organotrophum Huber, Kristjansson & Stetter 1988
  - - P. ferrireducens Slobodkina et al. 2015
    - - - P. igneiluti Lee et al. 2017
        - - P. aerophilum Völkl, Huber & Stetter 1996
          - P. calidifontis Amo et al. 2008
      - - P. neutrophilum (Stetter & Zillig 1989) Chan, Cozen & Lowe 2012
        - - P. arsenaticum Huber et al. 2001
          - P. oguniense Sako, Nunoura & Uchida 2001

53 marker proteins based GTDB 11-RS232

- Pyrobaculum
  - P. islandicum
  - - P. neutrophilum
    - - P. calidifontis
      - - - P. aerophilum
          - P. ferrireducens
        - - P. arsenaticum
          - P. oguniense

== See also ==
- Pyrobaculum asR3 small RNA
- List of Archaea genera
