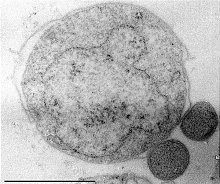
- Two Nanoarchaeum equitans cells (and its larger host Ignicoccus)

Scientific classification
- Domain: Archaea
- Kingdom: Nanobdellati
- Phylum: Nanobdellota
- Class: Nanoarchaeia
- Order: Nanoarchaeales
- Family: Nanoarchaeaceae
- Genus: Nanoarchaeum
- Species: N. equitans

Binomial name
- Nanoarchaeum equitans Huber et al. 2002

= Nanoarchaeum equitans =

Species of archaeon

Nanoarchaeum equitans is a species of marine archaea that was discovered in 2002 in a hydrothermal vent off the coast of Iceland on the Kolbeinsey Ridge by Karl Stetter. It has been proposed as the first species in a new phylum, and is the only species within the genus Nanoarchaeum. Strains of this microbe were also found on the Sub-polar Mid Oceanic Ridge, and in the Obsidian Pool in Yellowstone National Park. Since it grows in temperatures approaching boiling, at about 80 °C (176 °F), it is considered to be a thermophile. It grows best in environments with a pH of 6, and a salinity concentration of 2%. Nanoarchaeum appears to be an obligate symbiont on the archaeon Ignicoccus; it must be in contact with the host organism to survive. Nanoarchaeum equitans cannot synthesize lipids but obtains them from its host. Its cells are only 400 nm in diameter, making it the smallest known archaeon.

N. equitans' genome consists of a single circular chromosome, and has an average GC-content of 31.6%. It lacks almost all of the genes required for the synthesis of amino acids, nucleotides, cofactors, and lipids, but encodes everything needed for repair and replication. N. equitans contains several genes that encode proteins employed in recombination, suggesting that N. equitans can undergo homologous recombination. A total of 95% of its DNA encodes for proteins or stable RNA molecules.

N. equitans has small appendages that come out of its circular structure. The cell surface is covered by a thin, lattice-shaped S-layer, which provides structure and protection for the entire cell.

== Genome ==
Mycoplasma genitalium (580 Kbp in size, with 515 protein-coding genes) was regarded as a cellular unit with the smallest genome size until 2003 when Nanoarchaeum was sequenced (491 Kbp, with 536 protein-coding genes).

Genetically, Nanoarchaeum is peculiar in that its 16S RNA sequence is undetectable by the most common methods. Initial examination of single-stranded ribosomal RNA indicated that the organism most likely belonged to the Archaea domain. However, its difference from the existing phyla, "Euryarchaeota" and Thermoproteota, was as great as the difference between the phyla. Therefore, it was given its own phylum, called "Nanoarchaeota". However, another group (see References) compared all of the open reading frames to the other Archaea. They argue that the initial sample, ribosomal RNA only, was biased and Nanoarchaeum actually belongs to the "Euryarchaeota" phylum.

The sequencing of the Nanoarchaeum genome has revealed a wealth of information about the organism's biology. The genes for several vital metabolic pathways appear to be missing. Nanoarchaeum cannot synthesize most nucleotides, amino acids, lipids, and cofactors. The cell most likely obtains these biomolecules from Ignicoccus. In particular, N. equitans lacks all of the genes that encode purine nucleotide biosynthesis in other organisms. However, unlike many parasitic microbes, Nanoarchaeum has many DNA repair enzymes, as well as everything necessary to carry out DNA replication, transcription, and translation. This may explain why the genome lacks the large stretches of non-coding DNA characteristic of other parasites.

The organism's ability to produce its own ATP is also in question.

Nanoarchaeum lacks the ability to metabolize hydrogen and sulfur for energy, as many thermophiles do. It does have five subunits of an ATP synthase as well as pathways for oxidative deamination. Whether it obtains energy from biological molecules imported from Ignicoccus, or whether it receives ATP directly is currently unknown. The genome and proteome composition of N. equitans are marked with the signatures of dual adaptation – one to high temperature and the other to obligate parasitism (or symbiosis).

== See also ==
- Archaea
- "Candidatus Carsonella ruddii", Rickettsia, and other Pseudomonadota
- Ignicoccus
- Mycoplasma
- Smallest organisms
- Candidatus Sukunaarchaeum mirabile
