= Thermoproteus =

Scientific classification
- Domain: Archaea
- Kingdom: Thermoproteati
- Phylum: Thermoproteota
- Class: Thermoprotei
- Order: Thermoproteales
- Family: Thermoproteaceae
- Genus: Thermoproteus; Zillig & Stetter 1982

Type species
- Thermoproteus tenax Zillig & Stetter 1982

Species
- T. tenax; T. thermophilus; T. uzoniensis

Genus of archaea

Thermoproteus is a genus of archaeans in the family Thermoproteaceae. These prokaryotes are thermophilic sulphur-dependent organisms related to the genera Sulfolobus, Pyrodictium and Desulfurococcus. They are hydrogen-sulphur autotrophs and can grow at temperatures of up to 95 °C.

== Description and significance ==
Thermoproteus is a genus of anaerobes that grow in the wild by autotrophic sulfur reduction. Like other hyperthermophiles, Thermoproteus represents a living example of some of Earth's earliest organisms, located at the base of the Archaea.

== Genome structure ==
Genetic sequencing of Thermoproteus has revealed much about the organism's modes of metabolism. Total genome length is 1.84 Mbp, and the DNA is double-stranded and circular. Genes are arranged in co-transcribed clusters called operons. The Thermoproteus tenax genome has been completely sequenced.

== Phylogeny ==
The currently accepted taxonomy is based on the List of Prokaryotic names with Standing in Nomenclature (LPSN) and National Center for Biotechnology Information (NCBI).

16S rRNA based LTP_07_2026

- Thermoproteus
  - T. thermophilus Yim et al. 2015
  - - T. tenax Zillig & Stetter 1982
    - T. uzoniensis Bonch-Osmolovskaya et al. 2001

53 marker proteins based GTDB 11-RS232

- Thermoproteus
  - T. tenax
  - T. uzoniensis

== Cell structure and metabolism ==
A significant amount of research has been done on the metabolism of Thermoproteus and other hyperthermophiles as well. Thermoproteus metabolizes autotrophically through sulfur reduction, but it grows much faster by sulfur respiration in cultivation. In T. tenax, a number of metabolic pathways allow the cell to select a mode of metabolism depending on the energy requirements of the cell (depending, for example, on the cell's developmental or growth stage). Like all archaea, Thermoproteus possesses unique membrane lipids, which are ether-linked glycerol derivatives of 20 or 40 carbon branched lipids. The lipids' unsaturations are generally conjugated (as opposed to the unconjugation found in Bacteria and Eukaryota). In Thermosphaera, as in all members of the Crenarchaeota, the membranes are predominated by the 40-carbon lipids that span the entire membrane. This causes the membrane to be composed of monolayers with polar groups at each end. The cells are rod-shaped with diameters of up to 4 micrometres and up to 100 micrometres in length, and reproduce by developing branches on the end of the cell which grow into individual cells. They are motile by flagella.

== Ecology ==
Members of Thermoproteus are found in acidic hot springs and water holes; they have been isolated in these habitats in Iceland, Italy, North America, New Zealand, the Azores, and Indonesia. Their optimal growth temperature is 85 °C.

== See also ==
- List of Archaea genera
