= Caldisphaera =

Scientific classification
- Domain: Archaea
- Kingdom: Thermoproteati
- Phylum: Thermoproteota
- Class: Thermoprotei
- Order: Acidilobales
- Family: Caldisphaeraceae
- Genus: Caldisphaera; Itoh, Suzuki, Sanchez & Nakase 2003

Type species
- Caldisphaera lagunensis Itoh et al. 2003

Species
- "C. dracosis" Boyd et al. 2007; C. lagunensis Itoh et al. 2003

Genus of archaea

Caldisphaera is a genus of archaea in the family Caldisphaeraceae.

== Taxonomy ==
The currently accepted taxonomy is based on the List of Prokaryotic names with Standing in Nomenclature (LPSN) and National Center for Biotechnology Information (NCBI).

16S rRNA based LTP_07_2026

- Caldisphaera
  - C. lagunensis

53 marker proteins based GTDB 11-RS232

- Caldisphaera
  - "Ca. Hestiella acidicharens" St-John & Reysenbach 2024
  - C. lagunensis Itoh et al. 2003

== See also ==
- List of Archaea genera
