= Halorhabdus utahensis =

Scientific classification
- Domain: Archaea
- Kingdom: Methanobacteriati
- Phylum: Methanobacteriota
- Class: Halobacteria
- Order: Halobacteriales
- Family: Haloarculaceae
- Genus: Halorhabdus
- Species: H. utahensis

Binomial name
- Halorhabdus utahensis Wainø et al. 2000

Species of archaea

Halorhabdus utahensis is a halophilic archaeon isolated from the Great Salt Lake in Utah.

== Cell structure and metabolism ==
Halorhabdus utahensis (salt-loving rod) is a motile, Gram-negative, extremely halophilic archaeon that forms red, circular colonies. It grows at the temperatures between 17 and 55 °C, with optimal growth occurring at 50 °C. It can also grow over a pH range of 5.5–8.5 with the optimal pH value between 6.7 and 7.1. Further, with its extremely high salinity optimum of 27% NaCl, Halorhabdus has one of the highest reported salinity optima of any living organism.

The cells of H. utahensis are extremely pleomorphic, exhibiting any shape from irregular coccoid or ellipsoid to triangular, club-shaped or rod-shaped forms. The rod-shaped and ellipsoid cells are 2-10 by 0.5-1 μm and 1-2 by 1 μm in size, respectively, and the spherical cells have a diameter of approximately 1 μm. The archaeon uses only a limited range of substrates, such as glucose, xylose, and fructose, for growth, and is unique in its inability to utilize yeast extract or peptone. Other substances that did not stimulate the organism's growth include organic acids, amino acids, alcohols, glycogen, and starch.
