= Thermoacidophile =

Microorganisms which live in water with high temperature and high acidity

A thermoacidophile is an extremophilic microorganism that is both thermophilic and acidophilic; i.e., it can grow under conditions of high temperature and low pH. The large majority of thermoacidophiles are archaea (particularly the Thermoproteota and "Euryarchaeota") or bacteria, though occasional eukaryotic examples have been reported. Thermoacidophiles can be found in hot springs and solfataric environments, within deep sea vents, or in other environments of geothermal activity. They also occur in polluted environments, such as in acid mine drainage.

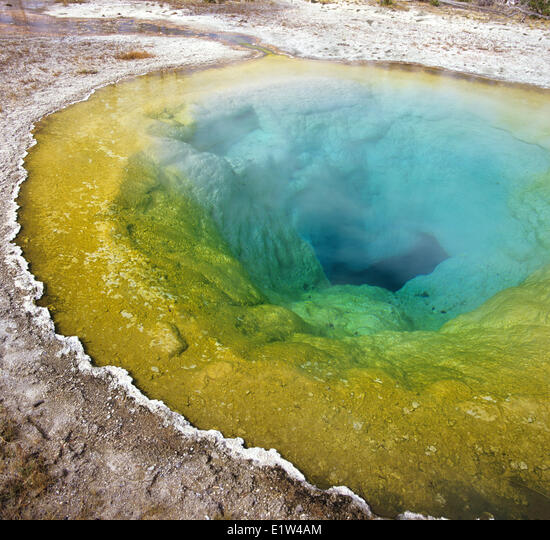
Hot Spring in Yellowstone : A typical environment for thermoacidophiles to inhabit

Biotopes that favor thermoacidophiles can be found both on land and in the sea, where the mineral composition of the water typically consists of highly reduced compounds such as various sulfides, and highly oxidized sulfates. The conversion of reduced sulfides to oxidized sulfates leads to a production of protons, lowering the pH of the surrounding environment. While reduced sulfides are generally considered to be reactive, their conversion to their oxidized counterpart by abiotic natural processes (reacting with things that are not living organisms) is relatively low. This fact emphasizes the importance of bio-oxidizers (i.e. thermoacidophiles) in constructing and maintaining this ecological niche. Most of the microbes in these harsh environments are chemolithoautotrophs (they gain electrons from pre-formed inorganic compounds, and use carbon dioxide as a carbon source), which have evolved specific adaptations to inhabit and grow in such selective environments. Archaea are unique in their ability to thrive in these environments, as many bacterial and eukaryotic organisms are limited to tolerance of such acidic (pH < 3.5), thermal (T> 65 °C) environments and do not demonstrate sustained thermoacidophilicity. However, the genome of a thermoacidophilic eukaryote, the red algae Galdieria sulphuraria, revealed that its environmental adaptations likely originated from horizontal gene transfer from thermoacidophilic archaea and bacteria.

An apparent tradeoff has been described between adaptation to high temperature and low pH; relatively few examples are known that are tolerant of the extremes of both environments (pH < 2, growth temperature > 80 °C). Adaptations that allow them to survive in these harsh environments include proton pumps and buffering strategies, epigenetic modifications of the chromosome, and altered membrane structures. Many thermoacidophilic archaea have aerobic or microaerophilic metabolism, although obligately anaerobic examples (e.g. the Acidilobales) have also been identified.

== Unique biological adaptations ==
=== Chromosome structure and epigenetic modifications ===
Most thermoacidophiles are archaeal, with Crenarchaea belonging to the Sulfolobales order serving as a model system. Many of the biological mechanisms used by Crenarchae are shared by all archaea but there are some lineage-specific differences unique to thermoacidophilic archaea. One example of the unique differences for thermoacidophilic archaea is their lack of eukaryote-like histones, which are typically involved in the packaging and reorganization of the chromosome, all Thermoplasma and Crenarchaeota lack histone like proteins.

Thermoacidophillic archaea typically have single, small, circular chromosome between 1.5 and 3 Mbp in length. Chromatin proteins are used to condense and organize the genome, however this is not done with histone-orthologs as in eukaryotes or some bacteria, a large evolutionary divergence that characterizes thermoacidophilic archaea. Instead of using histones, a type of protein called nucleoid associated proteins (NAPs) are expressed, however the degree of conservation between species varies from protein to protein. These proteins are typically between 7 and 10 kDa in size, are basic, and account for up to 5% of cellular protein, making them one of the most highly expressed proteins in the cell.

The functionality of NAPs can be altered via post-translational modifications (PTMs). These epigenetic modifications have significant impacts on their functionality and the fitness of thermophiles in extreme environments. Methylation, a form of PTM, is a common alteration to NAP structure. It has been linked to the thermostabilization of the proteins as well as the regulation of genes in epigenetic studies. An example of the impact of methylation can be seen in an adaptive laboratory evolution experiment, in which a strain of Sa. solfataricu developed a super-acid resistant phenotype, even though its genome had not changed from the reference sequence. Investigation revealed that the acid resistance was conferred by a difference in the methylation of Sso7d and Cren7, both Naps. This highlights how a difference in methylation can have a significant impact on the fitness of thermophiles.

In addition to local structuring by NAPs, the Sulfolobales genome is also globally compartmentalized into two sub-Mbp compartments. Each compartment, often referred to as the A and B compartment respectively, is populated by specific sets of genes that vary in their level of transcription. The A compartment generally contains genes involved in essential biological processes such as the creation of metabolic proteins, which are highly expressed in the cell. The B compartment holds genes related to environmental stress responses, CRISPR-Cas clusters and fatty acid metabolism. The exact mechanism regarding the global restructuring of the genome is not currently known, however a protein known as coalescin has been found to play a critical role in the restructuring, with an inverse correlation observed between the occurrence of coalescin and the transcriptional activity of genes in the B compartment.

=== Thermostability and stress responses ===
Thermoacidophiles have adapted to the extreme environments they inhabit by evolving specific mechanisms to deal with the high temperature and low pH environment. While these mechanisms are not necessarily unique to thermoacidophiles and can be found in thermophiles and acidophiles respectively, their incorporation into a single organism can lead to synergistic effects. For example, while DNA stability does not necessarily depend solely on its base pair composition, some thermoacidophiles favor the AGG and AGA codons over CGN for arginine. The trend of favoring the heat-stabile nucleotides adenine and guanine has been observed throughout thermoacidophile genomes. Additionally, thermoacidophiles tend to avoid using amino acids that participate in unwanted side reactions at high temperatures, including histidine, glutamine and threonine. Proteins in thermoacidophiles are also smaller on average than those found in mesophiles, with the former having an average length of 283 amino acids and the latter being 340, a difference of ~20%. This is theorized to occur because smaller proteins are more heat stabile than larger proteins. The use of reverse DNA gyrase is another thermal adaptation, it introduces positive DNA supercoiling to increase the heat stability of the genome, and is a protein unique to hyperthermophiles.

While some thermoacidophiles can grow optimally at a pH close to 0, their cytoplasm is often near neutral pH. This results in a massive pH difference across the membrane. Thermoacidophiles have several mechanisms to deal with this. The first of which is a reversed membrane potential, where the intracellular side of the membrane is positively charged and the extracellular membrane is negatively charged. The reversed membrane potential is created by the active transport of potassium ions into the cell, which prevents the passive diffusion of protons across the membrane. Cytosolic buffering strategies are also implemented, such as using basic amino acids such as arginine, lysine and histidine. The structure of the membrane also contributes to the thermoacidophilicity of Sulfoluobales, as their membranes consist of ether linked lipids that are not as susceptible to acid hydrolysis and the increase of porosity that leads to thermal leakage as normal lipid bilayers. Some archaea also have cyclopentyl rings attached to their lipids that have been shown to increase the thermostability of the membrane.

Despite all of the previously mentioned adaptations that allow thermoacidophiles to survive harsh environments, it is inevitable that conditions in the cell reach a point where a protein is damaged by the extreme environment they inhabit. The thermosome is a common tool in thermoacidophilic archaea. It generally consists of multiple alpha and beta subunits, the proportions of which in the structure vary with temperature. The structure of the thermosome resembles a capsule with openings at each end. Unlike bacterial thermosomes, which have a separate subunit that closes off the internal space, the archaeal thermosome undergoes a conformational change to close the openings at each end via the hydrolysis of ATP. The thermosome closes around the protein and offers a more stable environment for the protein to refold properly. If the thermosome cannot refold the denatured protein, the protein is tagged by ubiquitin for degradation by the proteasome.
