= Halorhabdus tiamatea =

Scientific classification
- Domain: Archaea
- Kingdom: Methanobacteriati
- Phylum: Halobacteriota
- Class: Halobacteria
- Order: Halobacteriales
- Family: Haloarculaceae
- Genus: Halorhabdus
- Species: H. tiamatea

Binomial name
- Halorhabdus tiamatea Antunes et al. 2008

Species of archaea

Halorhabdus tiamatea is a halophilic archaeon isolated from the Red Sea. With its extremely high salinity optimum of 27% NaCl, Halorhabdus has one of the highest reported salinity optima of any living organism.

== Genome structure ==
The genome of Halorhabdus was sequenced in August 2014. The G + C content of its DNA is estimated to be 64%.
