= Nezhaarchaeota =

Scientific classification (Candidatus)
- Domain: Archaea
- Kingdom: Thermoproteati
- Phylum: "Nezhaarchaeota"; Wang et al. 2019

Class
- Methanosuratincolia

Synonyms
- "Culexarchaeota" Kohtz et al. 2022; "Methanomethylicota" Vanwonterghem et al. 2016; "Verstraetearchaeota" Vanwonterghem et al. 2016; "Culexarchaeia" Kohtz et al. 2022; "Methanomethylicia" corrig. Vanwonterghem et al. 2016; "Methanonezhaarchaeia" Kohtz, Nupp & Hatzenpichler 2025; "Nezhaarchaeia" corrig. Hua et al. 2019

Candidate phylum of thermoproteatian archaea

"Nezhaarchaeota" is a phylum of Thermoproteati archaea.

== Phylogeny ==
16S rRNA based LTP_07_2026

- Methanosuratincolia
  Methanosuratincolales

53 marker proteins based GTDB 11-RS232

- Methanosuratincolia
  - Methanosuratincolales
  - - "Methanonezhaarchaeales"
    - "Culexarchaeles"

Incertae sedis:

- "Methanohydrogenicales" corrig. Berghuis et al. 2019
- "Methanomethylarchaeales" corrig. Hua et al. 2019
- "Methanomethylovorales" Hua et al. 2019

== See also ==
- List of Archaea genera
