= Desulfurococcus =

Scientific classification
- Domain: Archaea
- Kingdom: Thermoproteati
- Phylum: Thermoproteota
- Class: Thermoprotei
- Order: Desulfurococcales
- Family: Desulfurococcaceae
- Genus: Desulfurococcus; Zillig & Stetter 1983

Type species
- Desulfurococcus mucosus Zillig & Stetter 1983

Species
- D. amylolyticus; D. fermentans; D. kamchatkensis; D. mobilis; D. mucosus; "D. saccharovorans"

Genus of archaea

Desulfurococcus is a genus of archaeans in the family Desulfurococcaceae.

== Phylogeny ==
The currently accepted taxonomy is based on the List of Prokaryotic names with Standing in Nomenclature (LPSN) and National Center for Biotechnology Information (NCBI).

16S rRNA based LTP_07_2026

- Desulfurococcus
  - D. amylolyticus Bonch-Osmolovskaya et al. 2001
  - D. mucosus Zillig & Stetter 1983

53 marker proteins based GTDB 11-RS232

- Desulfurococcus
  - D. amylolyticus
  - D. mucosus

== See also ==
- List of Archaea genera
