= Augarchaeota =

"Augarchaeota" Temporal range: Mesoproterozoic–Present

Scientific classification (Candidatus)
- Domain: Archaea
- Kingdom: Thermoproteati
- Phylum: "Augarchaeota" corrig. Nunoura et al. 2011

Order
- "Caldarchaeales"

Synonyms
- "Aigarchaeota" Nunoura et al. 2011; "Aigarchaeales"; "Caldiarchaeales" Cavalier-Smith 2014

Proposed archaeal phylum

"Augarchaeota" (previously "Aigarchaeota") is an archaeal phylum of which the main representative is "Candidatus Caldiarchaeum subterraneum". It is not yet clear if this represents a new phylum or a Nitrososphaeria class, since the genome of "Ca. Caldiarchaeum subterraneum" encodes several Nitrososphaeria-like features. The name "Aigarchaeota" comes from the Greek αυγή, avgí, meaning "dawn" or "aurora", for the intermediate features of hyperthermophilic and mesophilic life during the evolution of its lineage. The prefix Aig was found to be a misspelling, and corrected to Aug, thereby the new name "Augarchaeota".

== Taxonomy ==
Phylogeny of Caldarchaeales

- - - "Calditenuaceae"
      "Ca. Calditenuis aerorheumatis"
  - - "Caldarchaeaceae"
      - "Ca. Caldarchaeum subterraneum"
      - "Ca. Pelearchaeum maunauluense"
    - "Wolframiiraptoraceae"
      - - "Ca. Terraquivivens"
          - - "Ca. T. ruidianensis"
            - "Ca. T. tikiterensis"
          - - "Ca. T. tengchongensis"
            - "Ca. T. yellowstonensis"
      - - - "Ca. Geocrenenecus"
            - "Ca. G. dongiae"
            - - "Ca. G. arthurdayi"
              - "Ca. G. huangii"
        - - "Ca. Benthortus lauensis"
          - - "Ca. Wolframiiraptor"
              - "Ca. W. sinensis"
              - - "Ca. W. allenii"
                - "Ca. W. gerlachensis"

- Order "Caldarchaeales" corrig. Rinke et al. 2020 ["Aigarchaeales"]
  - Family "Calditenuaceae" Balbay et al. 2023
    - Genus "Candidatus Calditenuis" Beam et al. 2016
      - "Ca. C. aerorheumatis" corrig. Beam et al. 2016
      - "Ca. C. fumarioli" Balbay et al. 2023
  - Family "Caldarchaeaceae" Rinke et al. 2020
    - Genus "Candidatus Caldarchaeum" corrig. Nunoura et al. 2011
      - "Ca. C. subterraneum" corrig. Nunoura et al. 2011
    - Genus "Candidatus Pelearchaeum" Balbay et al. 2023
      - "Ca. P. maunauluense" Balbay et al. 2023
  - Family "Wolframiiraptoraceae" Buessecker et al. 2022
    - Genus "Candidatus Benthortus" Buessecker et al. 2022
      - "Ca. B. lauensis" Buessecker et al. 2022
    - Genus "Candidatus Geocrenenecus" Buessecker et al. 2022
      - "Ca. G. arthurdayi" Buessecker et al. 2022
      - "Ca. G. dongiae" Buessecker et al. 2022
      - "Ca. G. huangii" Buessecker et al. 2022
    - Genus "Candidatus Terraquivivens" Buessecker et al. 2022
      - "Ca. T. ruidianensis" Buessecker et al. 2022
      - "Ca. T. tengchongensis" Buessecker et al. 2022
      - "Ca. T. tikiterensis" Buessecker et al. 2022
      - "Ca. T. yellowstonensis" Buessecker et al. 2022
    - Genus "Candidatus Wolframiiraptor" Buessecker et al. 2022
      - "Ca. W. allenii" Buessecker et al. 2022
      - "Ca. W. gerlachensis" Buessecker et al. 2022
      - "Ca. W. sinensis" Buessecker et al. 2022

== See also ==
- List of Archaea genera
