= Halorhabdus =

Scientific classification
- Domain: Archaea
- Kingdom: Methanobacteriati
- Phylum: Methanobacteriota
- Class: Halobacteria
- Order: Halobacteriales
- Family: Haloarculaceae
- Genus: Halorhabdus; Wainø et al. 2000 emend. Antunes et al. 2008

Type species
- Halorhabdus utahensis Wainø et al. 2000

Species
- H. amylolytica; H. rudnickae; H. salina; H. tiamatea; H. utahensis

Genus of archaea

Halorhabdus is a genus of halophilic archaeans in the Haloarculaceae. With an extremely high salinity optimum of 27% NaCl, Halorhabdus has one of the highest reported salinity optima of any living organism.

== Phylogeny ==
The currently accepted taxonomy is based on the List of Prokaryotic names with Standing in Nomenclature (LPSN) and National Center for Biotechnology Information (NCBI).

16S rRNA based LTP_07_2026

- Halorhabdus
  - H. rudnickae
  - - H. tiamatea
    - H. utahensis

53 marker proteins based GTDB 11-RS232

- Halorhabdus
  - - H. amylolytica Wang et al. 2022
    - H. rudnickae Albuquerque et al. 2016
  - - H. salina Wang et al. 2022
    - - H. tiamatea Antunes et al. 2008
      - H. utahensis Waino et al. 2000

== See also ==
- List of Archaea genera
