= Thermoproteaceae =

Scientific classification
- Domain: Archaea
- Kingdom: Thermoproteati
- Phylum: Thermoproteota
- Class: Thermoprotei
- Order: Thermoproteales; Zillig & Stetter, 1982
- Family: Thermoproteaceae; Zillig & Stetter, 1982

Genera
- Caldivirga; Pyrobaculum; Thermocladium; Thermoproteus; Vulcanisaeta

Synonyms
- Thermocladiaceae Chuvochina et al. 2024

Family of archaea

Thermoproteaceae is a family of archaeans in the order Thermoproteales.

== Phylogeny ==
The currently accepted taxonomy is based on the List of Prokaryotic names with Standing in Nomenclature (LPSN) and National Center for Biotechnology Information (NCBI).

16S rRNA based LTP_07_2026

- Thermoproteaceae Thermoproteales
  - - - Caldivirga Itoh et al. 1999
      - Thermocladium Itoh et al. 1998
    - Vulcanisaeta Itoh et al. 2002
  - - Thermoproteus Zillig and Stetter 1982
    - Pyrobaculum Huber et al. 1988

53 marker proteins based GTDB 11-RS232

- Thermoproteales
  - Thermocladiaceae
    - - Caldivirga
      - Thermocladium
    - Vulcanisaeta
  - Thermoproteaceae
    - Thermoproteus
    - Pyrobaculum

== See also ==
- List of Archaea genera
