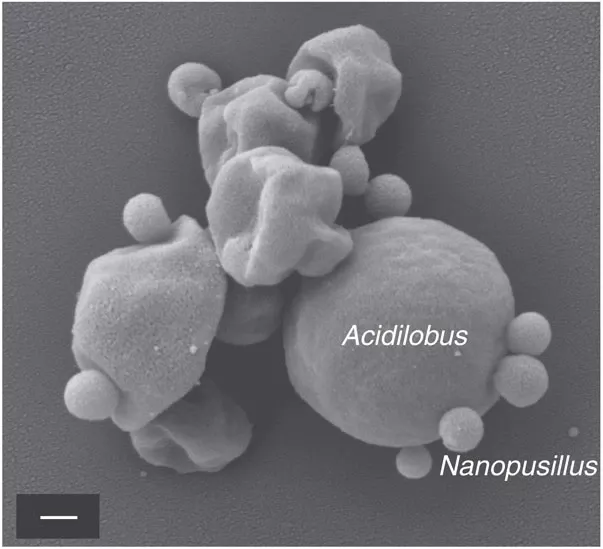

Scientific classification
- Domain: Archaea
- Kingdom: Thermoproteati
- Phylum: Thermoproteota
- Class: Thermoprotei
- Order: Desulfurococcales
- Family: Acidilobaceae
- Genus: Acidilobus; Prokofeva et al. 2000

Type species
- Acidilobus aceticus Prokofeva et al. 2000

Species
- A. aceticus; A. saccharovorans; "A. sulfurireducens"

= Acidilobus =

Genus of archaea

Acidilobus is a genus of archaea in the family Acidilobaceae.

== Phylogeny ==
The currently accepted taxonomy is based on the List of Prokaryotic names with Standing in Nomenclature (LPSN) and National Center for Biotechnology Information (NCBI).

16S rRNA based LTP_07_2026

- Acidilobus
  - A. aceticus Prokofeva et al. 2000
  - A. saccharovorans Prokofeva et al. 2009

53 marker proteins based GTDB 11-RS232

- Acidilobus
  A. saccharovorans

== See also ==
- List of Archaea genera
