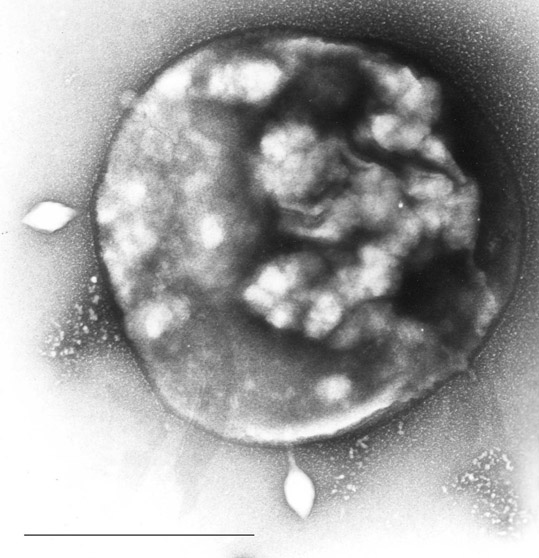
- Electron micrograph of Sulfolobus infected with Sulfolobus virus STSV1. Bar = 1 μm.

Scientific classification
- Domain: Archaea
- Kingdom: Thermoproteati
- Phylum: Thermoproteota
- Class: Thermoprotei
- Order: Sulfolobales; Stetter, 1989

Family
- Sulfolobaceae

= Sulfolobales =

Order of archaea

Sulfolobales is an order of archaeans in the class Thermoprotei.

== Phylogeny ==
The currently accepted taxonomy is based on the List of Prokaryotic names with Standing in Nomenclature (LPSN) and National Center for Biotechnology Information (NCBI).

16S rRNA based LTP_07_2026

- - Sulfolobales
    Sulfolobaceae
  - Desulfurococcales
    - Ignisphaeraceae
    - - Pyrodictiaceae
      - - - Fervidicoccaceae
          - Acidilobaceae
        - - - Ignicoccaceae
            - Desulfurococcaceae~1
          - Desulfurococcaceae

53 marker proteins based GTDB 11-RS232

- Sulfolobales
  - - Desulfurococcaceae
    - - Fervidicoccaceae
      - - - Ignicoccaceae
          - Pyrodictiaceae
        - Acidilobaceae
  - - - "Zestosphaeraceae"
      - Ignisphaeraceae
    - Sulfolobaceae

== DNA transfer ==
Exposure of Sulfolobus solfataricus to the DNA damaging agents UV-irradiation, bleomycin or mitomycin C induces cellular aggregation. Other physical stressors, such as pH or temperature shift, do not induce aggregation, suggesting that induction of aggregation is caused specifically by DNA damage. Ajon et al. showed that UV-induced cellular aggregation mediates chromosomal marker exchange with high frequency. Recombination rates exceeded those of uninduced cultures by up to three orders of magnitude. Frols et al. and Ajon et al. hypothesized that the UV-inducible DNA transfer process and subsequent homologous recombinational repair represents an important mechanism to maintain chromosome integrity. This response may be a primitive form of sexual interaction, similar to the more well-studied bacterial transformation that is also associated with DNA transfer between cells leading to homologous recombinational repair of DNA damage. In another related species, Sulfolobus acidocaldarius, UV-irradiation also increases the frequency of recombination due to genetic exchange.

=== The ups operon ===
The ups (UV-induced pilus) operon of Sulfolobus species is highly induced by UV irradiation. The pili encoded by this operon are employed in promoting cellular aggregation, which is necessary for subsequent DNA exchange between cells, resulting in homologous recombination.

A study of the Sulfolobales acidocaldarius ups operon showed that one of the genes downstream of the operon, saci-1497, encodes an endonuclease III that nicks UV-damaged DNA; and another gene of the operon, saci-1500, encodes a RecQ-like helicase that is able to unwind homologous recombination intermediates such as Holliday junctions. It was proposed that Saci-1497 and Saci-1500 function in an homologous recombination-based DNA repair mechanism that uses transferred DNA as a template. Thus it is thought that the ups system in combination with homologous recombination provide a DNA damage response which rescues Sulfolobales from DNA damaging threats.

== See also ==
- List of Archaea genera
