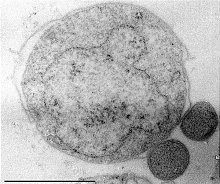

Scientific classification
- Domain: Archaea
- Kingdom: Thermoproteati
- Phylum: Thermoproteota
- Class: Thermoprotei
- Order: Desulfurococcales; Huber & Stetter 2002

Families
- Acidilobaceae; Caldisphaeraceae; Desulfurococcaceae; Pyrodictiaceae

Synonyms
- Acidilobales Prokofeva et al. 2009; Fervidicoccales Perevalova et al. 2010; "Igneococcales" (sic) Burggraf, Huber & Stetter 1997

= Desulfurococcales =

Order of archaea

The Desulfurococcales is an order of the Thermoprotei, part of the kingdom Archaea. The order encompasses some genera which are all thermophilic, autotrophs which utilise chemical energy, typically by reducing sulfur compounds using hydrogen. Desulfurococcales cells are either regular or irregular coccus in shape, with forms of either discs or dishes. These cells can be single, in pairs, in short chains, or in aciniform formation.

== Phylogeny ==
The currently accepted taxonomy is based on the List of Prokaryotic names with Standing in Nomenclature (LPSN) and National Center for Biotechnology Information (NCBI).

16S rRNA based LTP_07_2026

- - Sulfolobales
    Sulfolobaceae
  - Desulfurococcales
    - Ignisphaeraceae
    - - Pyrodictiaceae
      - - - Fervidicoccaceae
          - Acidilobaceae
        - - - Ignicoccaceae
            - Desulfurococcaceae~1
          - Desulfurococcaceae

53 marker proteins based GTDB 11-RS232

- Sulfolobales
  - - Desulfurococcaceae
    - - Fervidicoccaceae
      - - - Ignicoccaceae
          - Pyrodictiaceae
        - Acidilobaceae
  - - - "Zestosphaeraceae"
      - Ignisphaeraceae
    - Sulfolobaceae

== See also ==
- List of Archaea genera
