= Thermoprotei =

Scientific classification
- Domain: Archaea
- Kingdom: Thermoproteati
- Phylum: Thermoproteota
- Class: Thermoprotei; Reysenbach 2002

Orders
- "Gearchaeales" corrig.; "Marsarchaeales" (sic); Desulfurococcales; Sulfolobales; Thermofilales; Thermoproteales

Synonyms
- "Sulfolobia" Cavalier-Smith 2020; "Tardisphaeria" Prokofeva et al. 2025; "Thermoproteia" Oren et al. 2016

Class of archaea

The Thermoprotei is a class of the Thermoproteota.

== Phylogeny ==
The currently accepted taxonomy is based on the List of Prokaryotic names with Standing in Nomenclature (LPSN) and National Center for Biotechnology Information (NCBI).

16S rRNA based LTP_07_2026

- Thermoprotei
  - - Thermofilales
      Thermofilaceae
  - - - Thermoproteales
        Thermoproteaceae
    - - Sulfolobales
        Sulfolobaceae
      - Desulfurococcales
        - Ignisphaeraceae
        - - Pyrodictiaceae
          - - - Fervidicoccaceae
              - Acidilobaceae
            - - - Ignicoccaceae
                - - Ignicoccaceae~1
                  - Acidilobaceae~1
              - Desulfurococcaceae

53 marker proteins based GTDB 11-RS232

- - "Thermoproteia"
    - - "Gearchaeales" corrig.
        "Gearchaeaceae" corrig.
    - - Thermofilales
        Thermofilaceae
      - Thermoproteales
        - Thermocladiaceae
        - Thermoproteaceae
  - "Sulfolobia"
    - "Marsarchaeales" (sic)
      "Marsarchaeaceae" (sic)
    - Sulfolobales
      - - Desulfurococcaceae
        - - Fervidicoccaceae
          - - - Ignicoccaceae
              - Pyrodictiaceae
            - Acidilobaceae
      - - - Ignisphaeraceae
          - "Zestosphaeraceae"
        - Sulfolobaceae

== See also ==
- List of Archaea genera
