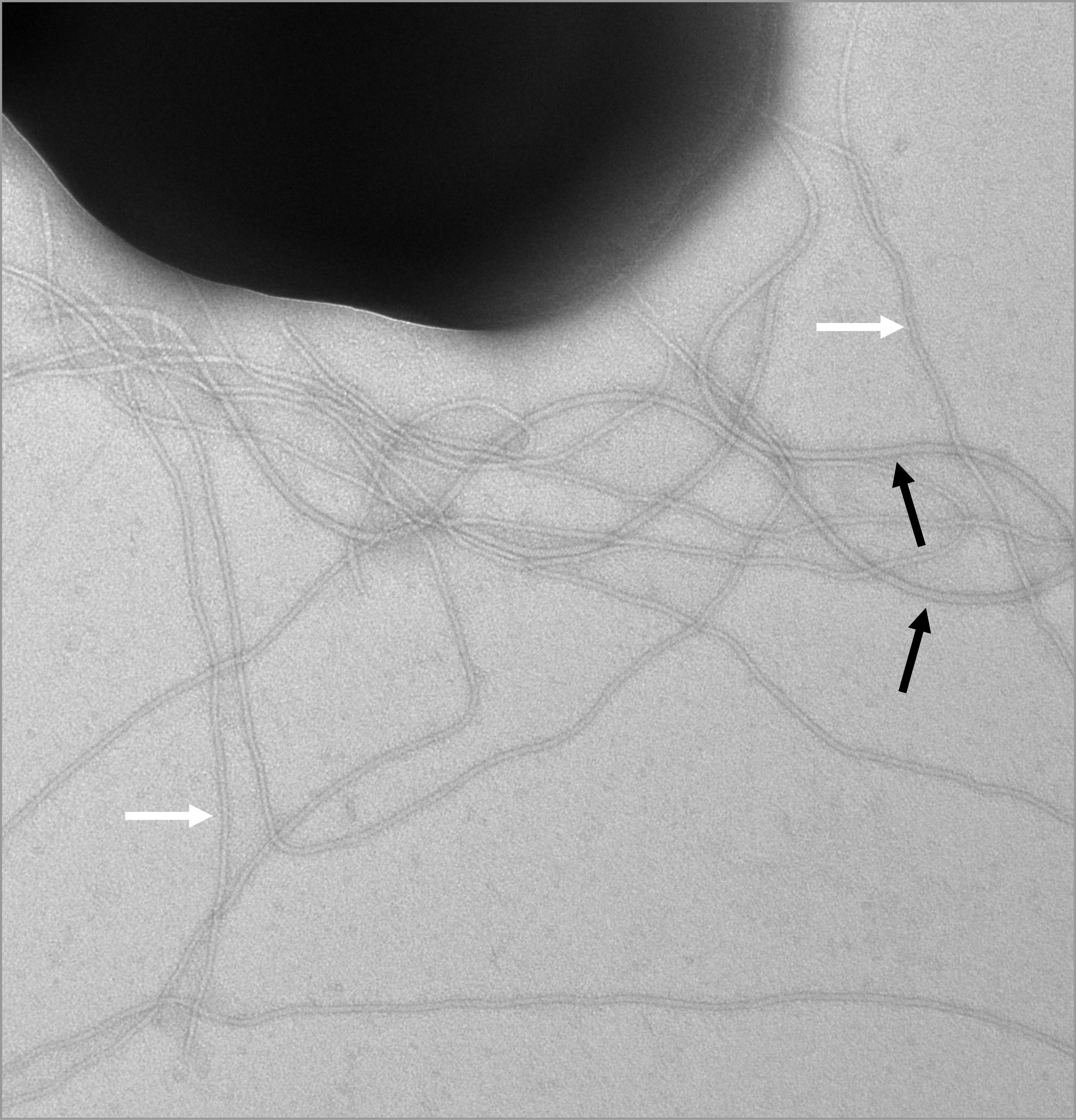
- Cell surface structures of Sulfolobus acidocaldarius, with white arrows pointing to fimbriae, and black arrows pointing to archaealla.

Scientific classification
- Domain: Archaea
- Kingdom: Thermoproteati; Guy & Ettema 2024

Type genus
- Thermoproteus Zillig & Stetter 1982

Phyla
- "Augarchaeota"; "Bathyarchaeota"; "Korarchaeota"; "Nezhaarchaeota"; Nitrososphaerota; Thermoproteota

Synonyms
- "Crenarchaeota" Garrity & Holt 2002; "Eocyta" Lake et al. 1984; "Filarchaeota" Cavalier-Smith 2014; "Proteoarchaeota" Petitjean et al. 2014; "TACK" Guy & Ettema 2011

= Thermoproteati =

Kingdom of archaea

Thermoproteati is a kingdom of archaea. Its synonym, "TACK", is an acronym for "Thaumarchaeota" (now Nitrososphaerota), "Aigarchaeota", "Crenarchaeota" (now Thermoproteota), and "Korarchaeota", the first groups discovered. They are found in different environments ranging from acidophilic thermophiles to mesophiles and psychrophiles and with different types of metabolism, predominantly anaerobic and chemosynthetic. Thermoproteati is a kingdom that is sister to the "Asgard" branch that gave rise to the eukaryotes. It has been proposed that the Thermoproteati kingdom be classified as "Crenarchaeota" and that the traditional "Crenarchaeota" (Thermoproteota) be classified as a class called Sulfolobia, along with the other phyla with class rank or order. After including the kingdom category into ICNP, the only validly published name of this group is kingdom Thermoproteati (Guy and Ettema 2024).

== Classification ==
- "Augarchaeota". It is a phylum proposed from the genome of the candidate species "Candidiatus Caldiarchaeum subterraneum" (now belongs to Thermoproteota as "Candidiatus Caldarchaeum subterraneum") found deep within a gold mine in Japan. Genomic sequences of this group have also been found in geothermal environments, both terrestrial and marine.
- "Nezhaarchaeota" was found in Jinze Hot Spring, Yunnan, China.
- Thermoproteota (formerly "Crenarchaeota"). It is the best-known edge and the most abundant archaea in the marine ecosystem. They were previously called sulfobacteria because of their dependence on sulfur and are important as carbon fixers. There are hyperthermophiles in hydrothermal vents and other groups are the most abundant at depths of less than 100 m.

== Phylogeny ==
The relationships are roughly as follows:

McKay et al. 2019

- Thermoproteati
  - - "Korarchaeota"
    - - "Bathyarchaeota"
      - - "Augarchaeota" corrig.
        - Nitrososphaerota
  - - "Verstraetearchaeota"
    - - Thermoproteota
      - - "Geoarchaeota"
        - "Marsarchaeota"

16S rRNA based LTP_07_2026

- Thermoproteota Thermoproteati
  - - Nitrososphaeria
      - Conexivisphaerales
      - - Nitrososphaerales
        - - Nitrosotaleales
          - Nitrosopumilales
  - - Methanosuratincolia
      Methanosuratincolales
    - "Thermoproteia"
      - Thermofilales
      - - Thermoproteales
        - - Desulfurococcales
          - Sulfolobales

53 marker proteins based GTDB 11-RS232

- - - "Korarchaeota"
      - "Korarchaeia"
        "Korarchaeales"
  - - Promethearchaeati
      Promethearchaeota
    - Thermoproteota Thermoproteati
      - "BAT"
        - - CALKCG01
            "Bifangarchaeales" [B24]
          - "Bathyarchaeia"
            - - "Xuanwuarculales" [RBG-16-48-13]
              - - "Hecatellales" [B25]
                - "Houtuarculales" [40CM-2-53-6]
            - - "Wuzhiqiibiales" [TCS64]
              - - "Zhuquarculales" [EX4484-135]
                - "Bathyarchaeales" [B26-1]
        - - Nitrososphaeria_A
            "Caldarchaeales"
          - Nitrososphaeria
            - "Geothermarchaeales"
            - - PSMU01
              - - Conexivisphaerales
                - Nitrososphaerales
      - "Sulfobacteria"
        - - Methanosuratincolia
            - Methanosuratincolales
            - - "Culexarchaeles"
              - "Methanonezhaarchaeales"
        - - "Thermoproteia"
            - "Gearchaeales"
            - - Thermofilales
              - Thermoproteales
          - "Sulfolobia"
            - "Marsarchaeales" (incl. "Tardisphaerales")
            - Sulfolobales

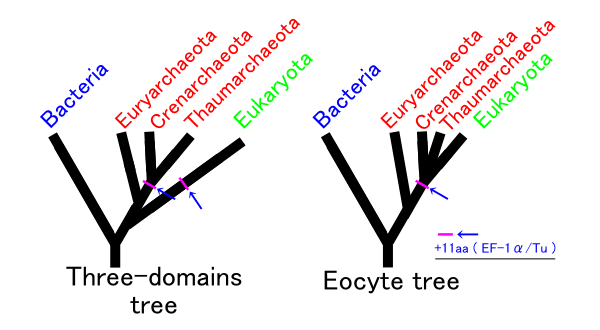
Eocyte hypothesis

== Eocyte hypothesis ==
The eocyte hypothesis proposed in the 1980s by James Lake suggests that eukaryotes emerged within the prokaryotic eocytes.

One piece of evidence supporting a close relationship between Thermoproteati and eukaryotes is the presence of a homolog of the RNA polymerase subunit Rbp-8 in Thermoproteota but not in "Euryarchaea".

== See also ==
- List of Archaea genera
