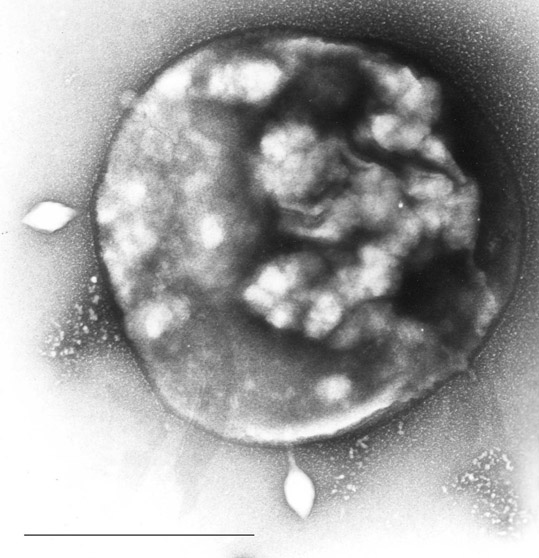
- Archaea Sulfolobus infected with specific virus STSV-1.

Scientific classification
- Domain: Archaea
- Kingdom: Thermoproteati
- Phylum: Thermoproteota; Garrity & Holt 2021

Classes
- Methanosuratincolia; Nitrososphaeria; Thermoprotei

Synonyms
- "Augarchaeota" corrig. Nunoura et al. 2011; Crenarchaeota Garrity & Holt 2002; "Filarchaeota" Cavalier-Smith 2014; "Culexarchaeota" Kohtz et al. 2022; "Gearchaeota" corrig. Kozubal et al. 2013; "Geothermarchaeota" Jungbluth, Amend & Rappe 2016; "Martarchaeota" corrig. Jay et al. 2018; "Methanomethylicota" Vanwonterghem et al. 2016 corrig.; "Methanonezhaarchaeia" Kohtz et al. 2025; "Nezhaarchaeota" Wang et al. 2019; Nitrososphaerota corrig. Brochier-Armanet et al. 2021; "Thaumarchaeota" Brochier-Armanet et al. 2008; "Thermoproteobacteria" Shetty et al. 2025; "Verstraetearchaeota" Vanwonterghem et al. 2016

= Thermoproteota =

Phylum of archaea

The Thermoproteota are archaea that have been classified as a phylum of the domain Archaea. Initially, the Thermoproteota were thought to be sulfur-dependent extremophiles but recent studies have identified characteristic Thermoproteota environmental rRNA indicating the organisms may be the most abundant archaea in the marine environment. Originally, they were separated from the other archaea based on rRNA sequences; other physiological features, such as lack of histones, have supported this division, although some crenarchaea were found to have histones. Until 2005 all cultured Thermoproteota had been thermophilic or hyperthermophilic organisms, some of which have the ability to grow at up to 113 °C. These organisms stain Gram negative and are morphologically diverse, having rod, cocci, filamentous and oddly-shaped cells. Recent evidence shows that some members of the Thermoproteota are methanogens.

Thermoproteota were initially classified as a part of regnum Eocyta in 1984, but this classification has been discarded. The term "eocyte" now applies to either TACK (formerly Crenarchaeota) or to Thermoproteota.

== Sulfolobus ==
One of the best characterized members of the Crenarchaeota is Sulfolobus solfataricus. This organism was originally isolated from geothermally heated sulfuric springs in Italy, and grows at 80 °C and pH of 2–4. Since its initial characterization by Wolfram Zillig, a pioneer in thermophile and archaean research, similar species in the same genus have been found around the world. Unlike the vast majority of cultured thermophiles, Sulfolobus grows aerobically and chemoorganotrophically (gaining its energy from organic sources such as sugars). These factors allow a much easier growth under laboratory conditions than anaerobic organisms and have led to Sulfolobus becoming a model organism for the study of hyperthermophiles and a large group of diverse viruses that replicate within them.

== Phylogeny ==
The currently accepted taxonomy is based on the List of Prokaryotic names with Standing in Nomenclature (LPSN) and National Center for Biotechnology Information (NCBI).

16S rRNA based LTP_07_2026

- Thermoproteota
  - - Nitrososphaeria
      - Conexivisphaerales
      - - Nitrososphaerales
        - - Nitrosotaleales
          - Nitrosopumilales
  - - Methanosuratincolia
      Methanosuratincolales
    - "Thermoproteia"
      - Thermofilales
      - - Thermoproteales
        - - Desulfurococcales
          - Sulfolobales

53 marker proteins based GTDB 11-RS232

- Thermoproteota
  - "BAT"
    - - CALKCG01
        "Bifangarchaeales" [B24]
      - "Bathyarchaeia"
        - - "Xuanwuarculales" [RBG-16-48-13]
          - - "Hecatellales" [B25]
            - "Houtuarculales" [40CM-2-53-6]
        - - "Wuzhiqiibiales" [TCS64]
          - - "Zhuquarculales" [EX4484-135]
            - "Bathyarchaeales" [B26-1]
    - - Nitrososphaeria_A
        "Caldarchaeales"
      - Nitrososphaeria
        - "Geothermarchaeales"
        - - PSMU01
          - - Conexivisphaerales
            - Nitrososphaerales
  - "Sulfobacteria"
    - - Methanosuratincolia
        - Methanosuratincolales
        - - "Culexarchaeles"
          - "Methanonezhaarchaeales"
    - - "Thermoproteia"
        - "Gearchaeales"
        - - Thermofilales
          - Thermoproteales
      - "Sulfolobia"
        - "Marsarchaeales"
        - Sulfolobales

== Recombinational repair of DNA damage ==
Irradiation of S. solfataricus cells with ultraviolet light strongly induces formation of type IV pili that can then promote cellular aggregation. Ultraviolet light-induced cellular aggregation was shown by Ajon et al. to mediate high frequency inter-cellular chromosome marker exchange. Cultures that were ultraviolet light-induced had recombination rates exceeding those of uninduced cultures by as much as three orders of magnitude. S. solfataricus cells are only able to aggregate with other members of their own species. Frols et al. and Ajon et al. considered that the ultraviolet light-inducible DNA transfer process, followed by homologous recombinational repair of damaged DNA, is an important mechanism for promoting chromosome integrity.

This DNA transfer process can be regarded as a primitive form of sexual interaction.

== Marine species ==
Beginning in 1992, data were published that reported sequences of genes belonging to the Thermoproteota in marine environments. Since then, analysis of the abundant lipids from the membranes of Thermoproteota taken from the open ocean have been used to determine the concentration of these "low temperature Crenarchaea" (See TEX-86). Based on these measurements of their signature lipids, Thermoproteota are thought to be very abundant and one of the main contributors to the fixation of carbon . DNA sequences from Thermoproteota have also been found in soil and freshwater environments, suggesting that this phylum is ubiquitous to most environments.

In 2005, evidence of the first cultured "low temperature Crenarchaea" was published. Named Nitrosopumilus maritimus, it is an ammonia-oxidizing organism isolated from a marine aquarium tank and grown at 28 °C.

== Possible connections with eukaryotes ==
The research about two-domain system of classification has paved the possibilities of connections between crenarchaea and eukaryotes.

DNA analysis from 2008 (and later, 2017) has shown that eukaryotes evolved from thermoproteota-like organisms. Other candidates for the ancestor of eukaryotes include closely related asgards. This could suggest that eukaryotic organisms possibly evolved from prokaryotes.

These results are similar to the eocyte hypothesis of 1984, proposed by James A. Lake. The classification according to Lake, states that both crenarchaea and asgards belong to Kingdom Eocyta. Though this has been discarded by scientists, the main concept remains. The term "Eocyta" now either refers to the TACK group or to Phylum Thermoproteota itself.

However, the topic is highly debated and research is still going on.

== See also ==
- Euryarchaeota
- List of Archaea genera
- Two-domain system
- Asgard (archaea)
