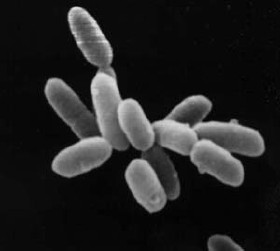
- Halobacterium sp. strain NRC-1, each cell about 5 µm in length.

Scientific classification
- Domain: Archaea
- Kingdom: Methanobacteriati (Garrity & Holt) Oren & Göker 2024

Type genus
- Methanobacterium Kluyver & van Niel 1936 (Approved Lists 1980)

Phyla
- "Hadarchaeota"; Halobacteriota; "Hydrothermarchaeota"; Methanobacteriota; Thermoplasmatota

Synonyms
- "Euryarchaeida" Luketa 2012; "Euryarchaeota" Woese, Kandler & Wheelis, 1990; "Methaneocreatrices" Margulis & Schwartz 1982; "non Euryarchaeota s.s." Garrity & Holt 2002

= Methanobacteriati =

Kingdom of archaea

Methanobacteriati (formerly "Euryarchaeota", from Ancient Greek εὐρύς eurús, "broad, wide") is a kingdom of archaea. Methanobacteriati are highly diverse and include methanogens, which produce methane and are often found in intestines; halobacteria, which survive extreme concentrations of salt; and some extremely thermophilic aerobes and anaerobes, which generally live at temperatures between 41 and 122 °C. They are separated from the other archaeans based mainly on rRNA sequences and their unique DNA polymerase. The only validly published name for this group under the Prokaryotic Code is Methanobacteriati.

== Description ==
The Methanobacteriati are diverse in appearance and metabolic properties. The kingdom contains organisms of a variety of shapes, including both rods and cocci. Methanobacteriati may appear either gram-positive or gram-negative depending on whether pseudomurein is present in the cell wall. Methanobacteriati also demonstrate diverse lifestyles, including methanogens, halophiles, sulfate-reducers, and extreme thermophiles in each. Others live in the ocean, suspended with plankton and bacteria. Although these marine Methanobacteriati are difficult to culture and study in a lab, genomic sequencing suggests that they are motile heterotrophs.

Though it was previously thought that Methanobacteriati only lived in extreme environments (in terms of temperature, salt content and/or pH), a paper by Korzhenkov et al. published in January 2019 showed that Methanobacteriati also live in moderate environments, such as low-temperature acidic environments. In some cases, Methanobacteriati outnumbered the bacteria present. Methanobacteriati have also been found in other moderate environments such as water springs, marshlands, soil and rhizospheres. Some Methanobacteriati are highly adaptable; an order called Halobacteriales are usually found in extremely salty and sulfur-rich environments but can also grow in salt concentrations as low as that of seawater 2.5%. In rhizospheres, the presence of Methanobacteriati seems to be dependent on that of mycorrhizal fungi; a higher fungal population was correlated with higher Methanobacteriatil frequency and diversity, while absence of mycorrihizal fungi was correlated with absence of Methanobacteriati.

== Nomenclatural status ==
Under the International Code of Nomenclature of Prokaryotes, there has been no (and cannot be any) valid name for this group, as it exceeds the level of a phylum. In 2024, the Code was amended to included the levels of kingdom and domain. In the same year, the name Methanobacteriati was validly published for this group, making it the first and only "valid name" under the Code. The LPSN, which aligns itself with the Code, adopts this view and lists the earlier "Euryarchaeota" as an invalidly published phylum.

The competing SeqCode for uncultivated taxa also has no level above phylum, hence "Methanobacteriati" also has no standing there. The Methanobacteriati name has no standing either: SeqCode only automatically accepts a name made under the Prokaryotic Code if it's older than 2023.

Methanobacteriati was listed in National Center for Biotechnology Information (NCBI) taxonomy browser as a current name for phylum (Euryarchaeota Garrity and Holt 2002) till September 2024, considering Methanobacteriota as heterotypic synonym. From October 2024 the names Methanobacteriati for kingdom and Halobacteriota, Methanobacteriota and Thermoplasmatota for included phyla are listed.

The taxon Methanobacteriati is also listed in the Bergey's Manual of Systematics of Archaea and Bacteria, but this is because the latest version of the chapter was published in 2017.

Methanobacteriati / "Euryarchaeota" is not listed as a taxon in the Genome Taxonomy Database (GTDB), as the algorithm does not generate kingdoms.

== Phylogeny ==
16S rRNA based LTP_07_2026

- Archaea
  - Microcaldota
  - - - - "Methanopyria"
        - - Nanobdellati
            Nanobdellota
      - - Promethearchaeati
          Promethearchaeota
        - Thermoproteati
          Thermoproteota
    - - Methanobacteriati
        - - Methanobacteriota
            "Methanobacteriia"
        - - "Thermococcia"
          - - "Methanococcia"
            - - - "Archaeoglobia"
                - - Thermoplasmatota
                    "Thermoplasmatia"
              - - Halobacteriota
                  - - Methanonatronarchaeia
                    - - - Methanocellia
                        - "Methanomicrobia"
                      - Methanosarcinia
                  - Halobacteria

Other phylogenetic analyzes have suggested that the archaea of the kingdom Nanobdellati may also belong to Methanobacteriati and that they may even be a polyphyletic group occupying different phylogenetic positions within Methanobacteriati. It is also debated whether the phylum Altiarchaeota should be classified in Nanobdellati or Methanobacteriati. A cladogram summarizing this proposal is graphed below. The groups marked in quotes are lineages assigned to Nanobdellati, but phylogenetically separated from the rest.

Dombrowski et al. 2019, Jordan et al. 2017 and Cavalier-Smith 2020.

- Archaea
  - Methanobacteriati
    - - Thermococci
      - - Hadesarchaea
        - - - Methanobacteria
            - - Methanopyri
              - Methanococci
          - - - Thermoplasmata
              - - Archaeoglobi
                - - Methanomicrobia
                  - - "Nanohaloarchaeota"
                    - Haloarchaea
            - - "Altiarchaeota"
              - Nanobdellati
                - - Diapherotrites
                  - Micrarchaeota
                - - Undinarchaeota
                  - - Aenigmarchaeota
                    - - - Nanoarchaeota
                        - Parvarchaeota
                      - - Mamarchaeota
                        - - Pacearchaeota
                          - Woesearchaeota
  - - TACK
    - Asgard
      - - Lokiarchaeota
        - - Odinarchaeota
          - Thorarchaeota
      - - Heimdallarchaeota
        - Eukaryota

53 marker proteins based GTDB 11-RS232

- Archaea
  - "Undinarchaeota"
  - - - - "Huberarchaeaota"
        - - "Aenigmarchaeota"
          - - "Terrarchaeota" [EX4484-52]
            - "Nanohalarchaeota"
      - Nanobdellota
    - - - "Altarchaeota"
        - - "Iainarchaeota"
          - "Micrarchaeota"
      - - - AGJL01
            "Methanococcia"
        - - - - JAADCQ01
                "Methanopyria"
              - "Hydrothermarchaeota"
                "Hydrothermarchaeia"
            - - - "Hadarchaeota"
                  "Hadarchaeia"
                - Methanobacteriota_B
                  "Thermococcia"
              - - Methanobacteriota
                  "Methanobacteriia"
          - - - Thermoplasmatota
                - "Izemarchaea" (MBG-D, E2)
                - - "Poseidoniia" (MGII & MGIII)
                  - - "Penumbrarchaeia"
                    - "Thermoplasmatia"
              - Halobacteriota
                - Methanonatronarchaeia
                - - - - "Methanoliparia"
                      - "Archaeoglobia"
                    - - - "Methanoflorentales" {Bog-38}
                        - Methanocellia
                      - - "Syntropharchaeia"
                        - Methanosarcinia
                  - - "Methanomicrobia"
                    - Halobacteria
            - - "Korarchaeota"
              - - Thermoproteota
                - Promethearchaeota {Promethearchaeati}

== See also ==
- Archaeal Richmond Mine acidophilic nanoorganisms (ARMAN)
- List of Archaea genera
- Monera
