= Palaeococcus helgesonii =

Scientific classification
- Domain: Archaea
- Kingdom: Methanobacteriati
- Phylum: Methanobacteriota
- Class: Thermococci
- Order: Thermococcales
- Family: Thermococcaceae
- Genus: Palaeococcus
- Species: P. helgesonii

Binomial name
- Palaeococcus helgesonii Amend et al. 2006

Species of archaeon

Palaeococcus helgesonii is a hyperthermophillic, anaerobic yet microaerobic archaeon from a geothermal well found in Vulcano, Italy. It is characterized as sphere-shaped, has a cell diameter ranging from 0.6 to 1.5 μm, a cell envelope consisting of a cytoplasmic membrane, a periplasmic space, a thin, electron-dense layer, and tufts of polar flagella. It occurs singly or in pairs. It can survive in temperatures ranging from 45 to 80°C, a pH range of 5 to 8, and a salt range of 0.5 to 6.0%. In optimal conditions (a temperature of 80°C, a pH around 6.5, and a salt level of 2.8), it has a doubling time of 50 minutes. It also has a G+C of 42.5 mol.%.
