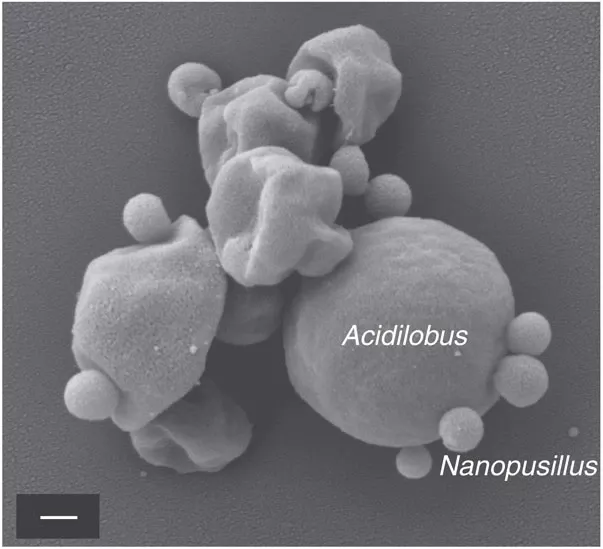
- "Nanopusillus acidilobi" attaching to an "Acidilobus" cell

Scientific classification (Candidatus)
- Domain: Archaea
- Kingdom: Nanobdellati
- Phylum: Nanobdellota
- Class: Nanobdellia
- Order: Nanobdellales
- Family: Nanobdellaceae
- Genus: Nanopusillus; Wurch et al. 2016

Type species
- "Ca. Nanopusillus acidilobi" Wurch et al. 2016

Species
- "Ca. N. acidilobi"; "Ca. N. massiliensis"; "Ca. N. phoceensis"; "Ca. N. stetteri"

= Nanopusillus =

Candidatus Nanopusillus

Proposed genus of Archaea

Candidatus Nanopusillus is a genus within the phylum Nanoarchaeota, and it has a few different species associated with it. One such species is "Ca. Nanopusillus massiliensis", which was the first co-isolated member of Nanoarchaeota of human origin, representing a new species within this genus. Another species within this genus is "Ca. Nanopusillus acidilobi". This particular species is known for being an anaerobic, hyperthermophilic acidophile, which thrives best in highly acidic and hot environments, specifically at 82 °C and pH 3.6. "Ca. Nanopusillus acidilobi", for example, was found in hot springs in Yellowstone National Park and is known to live epibiotically on the surface of archaeal hosts. Specifically, "Ca. Nanopusillus acidilobi" has a symbiotic relationship with the host organism Acidilobus sp. 7A.
