= Palaeococcus ferrophilus =

Scientific classification
- Domain: Archaea
- Kingdom: Methanobacteriati
- Phylum: Methanobacteriota
- Class: Thermococci
- Order: Thermococcales
- Family: Thermococcaceae
- Genus: Palaeococcus
- Species: P. ferrophilus

Binomial name
- Palaeococcus ferrophilus Takai et al. 2000

Species of archaeon

Palaeococcus ferrophilus is a barophilic, hyperthermophilic archaeon from a deep-sea hydrothermal vent chimney. It cells are irregular cocci and motile with multiple polar flagella.

Paleococcus was the third genus within Euryarchaeota to be described in the literature. These organisms prefer to use elemental sulfur as an electron acceptor, but they can also use ferrous oxide.
