= Palaeococcus =

Scientific classification
- Domain: Archaea
- Kingdom: Methanobacteriati
- Phylum: Methanobacteriota
- Class: Thermococci
- Order: Thermococcales
- Family: Thermococcaceae
- Genus: Palaeococcus; Takai et al. 2000 non Cockerell 1894

Type species
- Palaeococcus ferrophilus Takai et al. 2000

Species
- P. ferrophilus; P. helgesonii; P. pacificus

Genus of archaea

Palaeococcus is a genus of archaeans in the family Thermococcaceae.

== Phylogeny ==
The currently accepted taxonomy is based on the List of Prokaryotic names with Standing in Nomenclature (LPSN) and National Center for Biotechnology Information (NCBI).

16S rRNA based LTP_07_2026

- Palaeococcus
  - P. pacificus Zeng et al. 2013
  - - P. ferrophilus Takai et al. 2000
    - P. helgesonii Amend et al. 2006

53 marker proteins based GTDB 11-RS232

- Palaeococcus
  - P. pacificus
  - P. ferrophilus

== See also ==
- List of Archaea genera
