= Parvarchaeum =

Candidatus Parvarchaeum

Scientific classification (Candidatus)
- Domain: Archaea
- Kingdom: Nanobdellati
- Phylum: Nanobdellota
- Class: Nanobdellia
- Genus: Ca. Parvarchaeum Baker et al. 2010

Type species
- Ca. Parvarchaeum acidiphilum Baker et al. 2010

Species
- "Ca. P. acidiphilum"; "Ca. P. paracidiphilum"; "Ca. P. tengchongense"

Genus of archaea

Candidatus Parvarchaeum is a genus of Archaea in the proposed phylum of Nanoarchaeota. There are two species in the genus, Candidatus Parvarchaeum acidiphilum and Candidatus Parvarchaeum paracidiphilum (synonym Candidatus Parvarchaeum acidophilus), both of which are currently uncultured.

== Phylogeny ==
The currently accepted taxonomy is based on the List of Prokaryotic names with Standing in Nomenclature (LPSN) and National Center for Biotechnology Information (NCBI).

120 marker proteins based GTDB 09-RS220

- "Ca. Parvarchaeum"
  - "Ca. P. paracidiphilum" corrig. Baker et al. 2010
  - - "Ca. P. acidiphilum" Baker et al. 2010
    - "Ca. P. tengchongense" Rao et al. 2023

== See also ==
- List of Archaea genera
