= Sukunaarchaeum =

"Candidatus Sukunaarchaeum"

Scientific classification (Candidatus)
- Domain: Archaea
- Kingdom: incertae sedis
- Genus: "Ca. Sukunaarchaeum" Harada et al. 2026
- Species: "Ca. Sukunaarchaeum mirabile"

Binomial name
- "Ca. Sukunaarchaeum mirabile" Harada et al. 2026

Genus of archaeon

"Candidatus Sukunaarchaeum mirabile" (provisional name) is a species of archaea of which only the DNA is known, but which already presents several particularities: it is a holoparasite of the dinoflagellate Citharistes regius. Its DNA, the smallest known for an archaeon, codes only for proteins necessary for reproduction.

== Discovery and naming ==
The proposed name for the genus, "Ca. Sukunaarchaeum", is a reference to Sukunabikona ("renowned little lord"), a small Shinto deity associated with hot springs. The specific epithet, mirabile, means "astonishing, admirable, marvelous."

== Features ==
The DNA of "Ca. Sukunaarchaeum mirabile" is a circular molecule comprising 238 kilobase pairs (kbp), less than half the size of the smallest previously known archaeal DNA. This genome lacks almost all recognizable metabolic pathways, and primarily encodes the mechanisms of DNA replication, transcription, and translation. This suggests an unprecedented level of metabolic dependence on the host, a condition that challenges functional distinctions between minimal cellular life and viruses. Unlike viruses, "Ca. Sukunaarchaeum mirabile" has the ability to replicate its DNA, whereas viruses depend completely on their host organisms for replication. While researchers cannot exclude the presence of additional genetic elements (e.g., plasmids) besides the discovered circular chromosome, they found no evidence of other archaeal sequences in the amplified genome.

== Origin ==
The research was led by Ryo Harada, a molecular biologist from Dalhousie University in Halifax, Nova Scotia, along with Yuki Nishimura, Mami Nomura, Akinori Yabuki, Kogiku Shiba,Kazuo Inaba, Yuji Inagaki, and Takuro Nakayama.

== See also ==
- Smallest organisms
- Symbiogenesis
