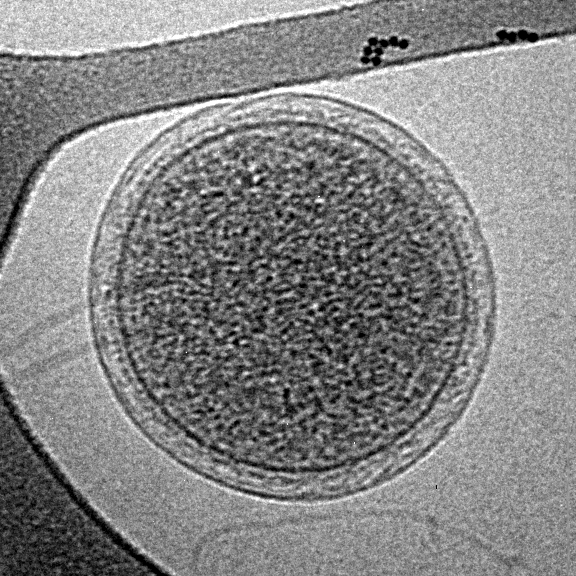
- Parvarchaeum acidiphilum

Scientific classification
- Domain: Archaea
- Kingdom: Nanobdellati; Rinke et al. 2024

Type genus
- Nanobdella Kato et al. 2022

Phyla
- "Aenigmatarchaeota"; "Huberarchaeota"; "Iainarchaeota"; "Micrarchaeota"; Microcaldota; Nanobdellota; "Nanohalarchaeota"; "Parvarchaeota"; "Undinarchaeota"

Synonyms
- "DPANN" Imachi et al. 2013

= Nanobdellati =

Nanoarchaea Temporal range: Paleoarchean–Present

Biological kingdom of archaea

Nanobdellati (syn. "DPANN") is a kingdom of archaea first proposed in 2013. Many members show novel signs of horizontal gene transfer from other domains of life. They are known as nanoarchaea or ultra-small archaea due to their smaller size (nanometric) compared to other archaea.

"DPANN" is an acronym formed by the initials of the first five groups discovered: Diapherotrites, Parvarchaeota, Aenigmarchaeota, Nanoarchaeota and Nanohaloarchaeota. Later Woesearchaeota and Pacearchaeota were discovered and proposed within the "DPANN" superphylum. In 2017, another phylum Altiarchaeota was placed into the "DPANN" superphylum. The monophyly of Nanobdellati is not yet considered established, due to the high mutation rate of the included phyla, which can lead to the artifact of the long branch attraction (LBA) where the lineages are grouped basally or artificially at the base of the phylogenetic tree without being related. These analyses instead suggest that Nanobdellati belongs to Euryarchaeota or is polyphyletic occupying various positions within Euryarchaeota.

The Nanobdellati groups together different phyla with a variety of environmental distribution and metabolism, ranging from symbiotic and thermophilic forms such as Nanoarchaeota, acidophiles like Parvarchaeota and non-extremophiles like Aenigmarchaeota and Diapherotrites. Nanobdellati was also detected in nitrate-rich groundwater, on the water surface but not below, indicating that these taxa are still quite difficult to locate.

Since the recognition of the kingdom rank by the ICNP, the only validly published name for this group is kingdom Nanobdellati.

== Characteristics ==
They are characterized by being small in size compared to other archaea (nanometric size) and in keeping with their small genome, they have limited but sufficient catabolic capacities to lead a free life, although many are thought to be episymbionts that depend on a symbiotic or parasitic association with other organisms. Many of their characteristics are similar or analogous to those of ultra-small bacteria (CPR group).

Limited metabolic capacities are a product of the small genome and are reflected in the fact that many lack central biosynthetic pathways for nucleotides, aminoacids, and lipids; hence most Nanobdellati archaea, such as ARMAN archaea, which rely on other microbes to meet their biological requirements. But those that have the potential to live freely are fermentative and aerobic heterotrophs.

They are mostly anaerobic and have not been cultivated. They live in extreme environments such as thermophilic, hyperacidophilic, hyperhalophilic or metal-resistant; or also in the temperate environment of marine and lake sediments. They are rarely found on the ground or in the open ocean.

== Classification ==
- Diapherotrites. Found by phylogenetic analysis of the genomes recovered from the groundwater filtration of a gold mine abandoned in the US
- Parvarchaeota and Micrarchaeota. Discovered in 2006 in acidic mine drainage from a US mine. They are of very small size and provisionally called ARMAN (Archaeal Richmond Mine acidophilic nanoorganisms).
- Woesearchaeota and Pacearchaeota. They have been identified both in sediments and in surface waters of aquifers and lakes, abounding especially in saline conditions.
- Aenigmarchaeota. Found in wastewater from mines and in sediments from hot springs.
- Nanohalarchaeota. Distributed in environments with high salinity.
- Nanoarchaeota. They were the first discovered (in 2002) in a hydrothermal source next to the coast of Iceland. They live as symbionts of other archaea.

=== Phylogeny ===
Tom A. Williams et al. 2017, Castelle et al. 2015 and Dombrowski et al. 2020.

Nanobdellati may be the first divergent clade of archaea according to some phylogenetic analyses. Recent phylogenetic analyses have found the following phylogeny between phyla.

- Bacteria
- Archaea
  - - Nanobdellati
      - - Altarchaeota
        - - Diapherotrites
          - Micrarchaeota
      - - Undinarchaeota
        - - Aenigmatarchaeota
          - - Nanohaloarchaeota
            - - - Nanoarchaeota
                - Parvarchaeota
              - - Mamarchaeota
                - - Pacearchaeota
                  - Woesearchaeota
    - - Euryarchaeota
      - - TACK
        - Asgard
          - - Lokiarchaeota
            - - Odinarchaeota
              - Thorarchaeota
          - - Heimdallarchaeota
            - (+α─Proteobacteria)
              Eukaryota

Jordan et al. 2017 Cavalier-Smith2020 and Feng et al 2021.

Other phylogenetic analyzes have suggested that Nanobdellati could belong to Euryarchaeota or that it may even be polyphyletic occupying different positions within Euryarchaeota. It is also debated whether the phylum Altiarchaeota should be classified in Nanobdellati or Euryarchaeota. An alternative location for Nanobdellati in the phylogenetic tree is as follows. The groups marked in quotes are lineages assigned to Nanobdellati, but phylogenetically separated from the rest.

- Bacteria
- Archaea
  - Euryarchaeota
    - Thermococci
    - - Hadesarchaea
      - - - Methanobacteria
          - - Methanopyri
            - Methanococci
        - - - Thermoplasmata
            - - Archaeoglobi
              - - Methanomicrobia
                - - "Nanohaloarchaeota"
                  - Haloarchaea
          - - "Altarchaeota"
            - Nanobdellati
              - - Diapherotrites
                - Micrarchaeota
              - - Undinarchaeota
                - - Aenigmatarchaeota
                  - - - Nanoarchaeota
                      - Parvarchaeota
                    - - Mamarchaeota
                      - - Pacearchaeota
                        - Woesearchaeota
  - - TACK
    - Asgard
      - - Lokiarchaeota
        - - Odinarchaeota
          - Thorarchaeota
      - - Heimdallarchaeota
        - (+α─Proteobacteria)
          Eukaryota

=== Taxonomy ===
The currently accepted taxonomy is based on the List of Prokaryotic names with Standing in Nomenclature (LPSN) and National Center for Biotechnology Information (NCBI).

GTDB phylogeny of Nanobdellati

- - - "Undinarchaeota"
      - "Undinarchaeia"
        "Undinarchaeales"
  - - - - "Altarchaeota"
          - "Altarchaeia"
            "Altarchaeales"
      - - "Iainarchaeota"
          - "Iainarchaeia"
            - "Forterreales"
            - "Iainarchaeales"
        - "Micrarchaeota"
          - "Micrarchaeia"
            - "Norongarragalinales"
            - - "Micrarchaeales"
              - - "Anstonellales"
                - "Burarchaeales"
    - - - - "Huberarchaeota"
            - "Huberarchaeia"
              "Huberarchaeales"
        - - - "Aenigmatarchaeota"
              - "Aenigmatarchaeia"
                - "Aenigmatarchaeales"
                - PWEA01
          - - "Terrarchaeota"
              - "Terrarchaeia"
                "Terrarchaeales"
            - "Nanohalarchaeota"
              - "Nanohalobiia"
                "Nanohalobiales"
      - - Nanobdellota
          - Nanobdellia
            - - "Tiddalikarchaeales"
              - - - "Jingweiarchaeales"
                  - JAPDLS01
                - "Parvarchaeales"
            - - - "Pacearchaeales"
                - "Woesearchaeales"
              - Nanobdellales

Kingdom Nanobdellati Rinke et al. 2013

- Phylum Microcaldota Sakai et al. 2023
  - Class Microcaldia Sakai et al. 2023
    - Order ?Microcaldales Sakai et al. 2023
- Phylum "Undinarchaeota" Dombrowski et al. 2020
  - Class "Undinarchaeia" Dombrowski et al. 2020
    - Order "Undinarchaeales" Dombrowski et al. 2020
- Phylum Altarchaeota Probst et al. 2018 (SM1)
  - Class "Altarchaeia" corrig. Probst et al. 2014
    - Order "Altarchaeales" corrig. Probst et al. 2014
- Phylum "Iainarchaeota" corrig. Rinke et al. 2013 ["Diapherotrites" Rinke et al. 2013] (DUSEL-3)
  - Class "Iainarchaeia" Rinke et al. 2020
    - Order "Forterreales" Probst & Banfield 2017
    - Order "Iainarchaeales" Rinke et al. 2020
- Phylum "Micrarchaeota" Baker & Dick 2013
  - Class "Micrarchaeia" Vazquez-Campos et al. 2021
    - Order "Anstonellales" Vazquez-Campos et al. 2021 (LFWA-IIIc)
    - Order "Burarchaeales" Vazquez-Campos et al. 2021 ["Fermentimicrarchaeales" Kadnikov et al. 2020; "Gugararchaeales" Vazquez-Campos et al. 2021] (LFWA-IIIa, LFWA-IIIb)
    - Order "Micrarchaeales" Vazquez-Campos et al. 2021
    - Order "Norongarragalinales" Vazquez-Campos et al. 2021 (LFWA-II)
- Phylum "Huberarchaeota" Probst et al. 2019
  - Class "Huberarchaeia" corrig. Probst et al. 2019
    - Order "Huberarchaeales" Rinke et al. 2020
- Phylum "Aenigmatarchaeota" corrig. Rinke et al. 2013 (DSEG, DUSEL2)
  - Class "Aenigmatarchaeia" corrig. Rinke et al. 2020
    - Order "Aenigmatarchaeales" corrig. Rinke et al. 2020
    - Order PWEA01
- Phylum "Terrarchaeota" Hamm et al. 2026 [EX4484-52]
  - Class "Terrarchaeia" Hamm et al. 2026
    - Order "Terrarchaeales" Hamm et al. 2026
- Phylum "Nanohalarchaeota" corrig. Rinke et al. 2013
  - Class "Nanohalobiia" corrig.La Cono et al. 2020
    - Order "Nanohalobiales" La Cono et al. 2020
  - Class "Nanohalarchaeia" corrig. Narasingarao et al. 2012
    - Order ?"Nanohalarchaeales"
    - Order ?"Nanohydrothermales" Xie et al. 2022
    - Order ?"Nucleotidisoterales" Xie et al. 2022
- Phylum Nanobdellota Huber et al. 2023
  - Class Nanobdellia Kato et al. 2022
    - Order JAPDLS01
    - Order "Jingweiarchaeales" Rao et al. 2023 [DTBS01]
    - Order Nanobdellales Kato et al. 2022
    - Order "Pacearchaeales" (DHVE-5, DUSEL-1)
    - Order "Parvarchaeales" Rinke et al. 2020 (ARMAN 4 & 5)
    - Order "Tiddalikarchaeales" Vazquez-Campos et al. 2021 (LFW-252_1)
    - Order "Woesearchaeales" (DHVE-6)
- Phylum ?"Mamarchaeota"
- Order ?"Wiannamattarchaeales"

== See also ==
- List of Archaea genera
