= Hydrothermarchaeota =

Scientific classification (proposed)
- Domain: Archaea
- Kingdom: Methanobacteriati
- Phylum: "Hydrothermarchaeota"; Jungbluth, Amend & Rappe 2017

Class
- Hydrothermarchaeia

Synonyms
- Marine Benthic Group E (MBG-E) Kato et al. 2019

Phylum of archaea

Hydrothermarchaeota is a proposed phylum of archaea typically found in marine environments high in iron and sulfur. The phylum name was proposed in 2017 after it was extracted from hydrothermal vents in Juan de Fuca Ridge. The clade was named after the association with hydrothermal environments. It is known through phylogenetic analysis of SSU rRNA.

== Habitat and metabolism ==
Genomic data from members of the clade Hydrothermarchaeota have been found in deep-sea hydrothermal environments in all of the world oceans except the Southern ocean, although they are not limited to hydrothermal vents. Hydrothermarchaeotes have yet to be cultivated in lab, but genetic analysis shows a large diversity of metabolic pathways, including nitrogen fixation, autotrophy, heterotrophy, hydrogenotrophy, oxidation of carbon monoxide, and reduction of sulfur, iron, and/or nitrate.

== Taxonomy ==
- Phylum "Candidatus Hydrothermarchaeota" Jungbluth, Amend & Rappe 2017
  - Class "Ca. Hydrothermarchaeia" Chuvochina et al. 2019
    - Order "Ca. Hydrothermarchaeales" Chuvochina et al. 2019
      - Family "Ca. Hydrothermarchaeaceae" Chuvochina et al. 2019
        - "Ca. Hydrothermarchaeum" Chuvochina et al. 2019
          - "Ca. H. profundi" Chuvochina et al. 2019
      - Family BMS3B
        - "Ca. Pyrohabitans" Adam et al. 2022
          - "Ca. P. jungbluthii" Adam et al. 2022

== See also ==
- List of Archaea genera
- Microbiology
