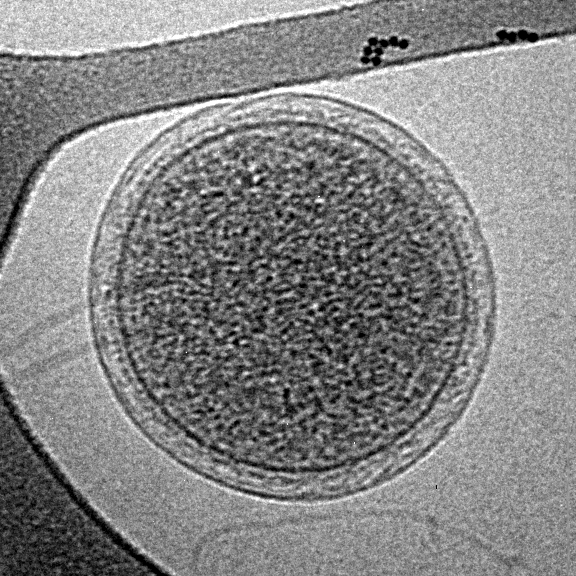
- Parvarchaeum acidiphilum

Scientific classification
- Domain: Archaea
- Kingdom: Nanobdellati
- Phylum: "Parvarchaeota"; Rinke et al. 2013

Orders
- "Parvarchaeia"; "Jingweiarchaeales"; "Parvarchaeales"; "Tiddalikarchaeales"

= Parvarchaeota =

Phylum of archaea

"Parvarchaeota" is a phylum of archaea belonging to the Nanobdellati kingdom. They have been discovered in acid mine drainage waters and later in marine sediments. The cells of these organisms are extremely small consistent with small genomes. Metagenomic techniques allow obtaining genomic sequences from non-cultured organisms, which were applied to determine this phylum.

The type species is "Candidatus Parvarchaeum acidiphilum". They have very small cells, around 400-500 nm, and reduced genomes made up of about 1000 genes. A similar-sized archaea that has been found in the same acidic environments is "Ca. Microarcheum", from the phylum Micrarchaeota.

According to the phylogenetic trees "Parvarchaeota" may be a sister group of Thermoplasmata within Euryarchaeota or belong to Nanobdellati, although it has also been suggested that all the Nanobdellati archaea belong phylogenetically to Euryarchaeota.

== Taxonomy ==
The currently accepted taxonomy is based on the List of Prokaryotic names with Standing in Nomenclature (LPSN) and National Center for Biotechnology Information (NCBI).

- Class "Parvarchaeia"
  - Order "Tiddalikarchaeales" Vazquez-Campos et al. 2021
    - Family "Tiddalikarchaeaceae" Vazquez-Campos et al. 2021
      - Genus "Candidatus Tiddalikarchaeum" Vazquez-Campos et al. 2021
        - "Ca. T. anstoanum" Vazquez-Campos et al. 2021
  - Order "Jingweiarchaeales" Rao et al. 2023
    - Family "Jingweiarchaeaceae" Rao et al. 2023
      - Genus "Candidatus Jingweiarchaeum" Rao et al. 2023
        - "Ca. J. tengchongense" Rao et al. 2023
  - Order JAPDLS01
    - Family "Haiyanarchaeaceae" Rao et al. 2023
      - Genus "Candidatus Haiyanarchaeum" Rao et al. 2023
        - "Ca. H. thermophilum" Rao et al. 2023
  - Order "Parvarchaeales" Rinke et al. 2020
    - Family "Parvarchaeaceae" Rinke et al. 2020 ["Acidifodinimicrobiaceae" Luo et al. 2020]
      - Genus "Candidatus Rehaiarchaeum" Rao et al. 2023
        - "Ca. R. fermentans" Rao et al. 2023
      - Genus "Candidatus Acidifodinimicrobium" Luo et al. 2020
        - "Ca. A. mancum" Luo et al. 2020
      - Genus "Candidatus Parvarchaeum" Baker et al. 2010
        - "Ca. P. acidiphilum" Baker et al. 2010
        - "Ca. P. paracidiphilum" corrig. Baker et al. 2010
        - "Ca. P. tengchongense" Rao et al. 2023

=== Phylogeny ===
Phylogeny of "Parvarchaeota".

- "Parvarchaeia"
  - - "Tiddalikarchaeales"
      - "Tiddalikarchaeaceae"
        "Ca. Tiddalikarchaeum anstoanum"
  - - - "Jingweiarchaeales"
        - "Jingweiarchaeaceae"
          "Ca. Jingweiarchaeum tengchongense"
    - - "JAPDLS01"
        - "Haiyanarchaeaceae"
          "Ca. Haiyanarchaeum thermophilum"
      - "Parvarchaeales"
        - "Parvarchaeaceae"
          - "Ca. Rehaiarchaeum fermentans"
          - - "Ca. Acidifodinimicrobium mancum"
            - - "Ca. Parvarchaeum"
                - "Ca. P. paracidiphilum"
                - - "Ca. P. acidiphilum"
                  - "Ca. P. tengchongense"

== See also ==
- List of Archaea genera
