= Geoarchaeum =

Candidatus Geoarchaeum

Scientific classification (Candidatus)
- Domain: Archaea
- Kingdom: incertae sedis
- Phylum: "Geoarchaeota"; Kozubal et al. 2013
- Genus: "Ca. Geoarchaeum" Hunt et al. 2016

Genus of incertae sedis archaea

"Candidatus Geoarchaeum" is a genus of incertae sedis archaea that does not contain any taxa.
