= Stirrup protein domain =

Stirrup
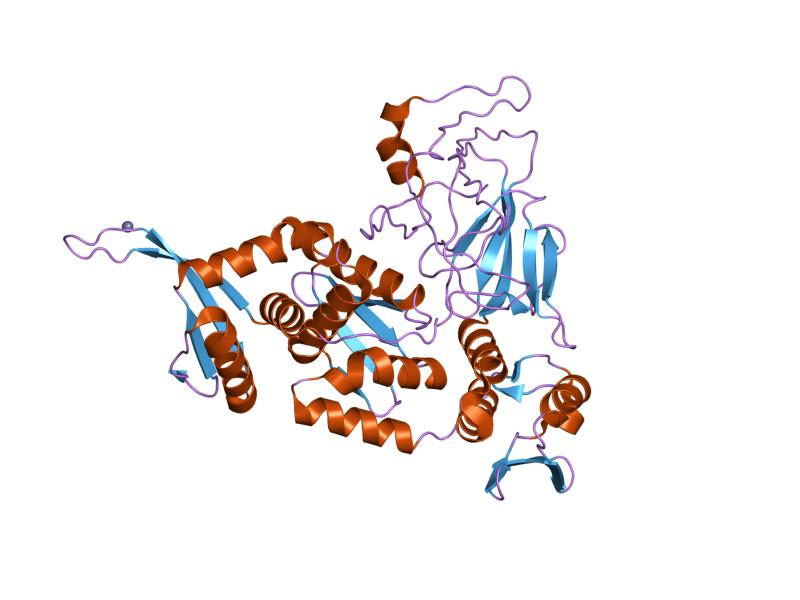
- crystal structure of an archaeal intein-encoded homing endonuclease pi-pfui

Identifiers
- Symbol: Stirrup
- Pfam: PF09061
- InterPro: IPR015146
- SCOP2: 1dq3 / SCOPe / SUPFAM
Available protein structures:
- PDB: IPR015146 PF09061 (ECOD; PDBsum)
- AlphaFold: IPR015146; PF09061

In molecular biology, the Stirrup is a protein domain found only in the domain archaea, in prokaryotic protein ribonucleotide reductases. It obtains its name due to its resemblance to an old fashioned Japanese stirrup. Stirrip has a molecular mass of 9 kDa and is folded into an alpha/beta structure. It allows for binding of the reductase to DNA via electrostatic interactions, since it has a predominance of positive charges distributed on its surface.

== Function ==
This protein domain provides the precursors necessary for DNA synthesis. It catalyses the biosynthesis of DNA from RNA.

== Structure ==
This structure contains a three-stranded beta-sheet to the solvent, which lies against alpha-helices.
