= The Surprising Archaea =

2000 book by John L. Howland

- Author: John L. Howland
- Subject: Archaea
- Publisher: Oxford University Press
- Publication date: 2000

The Surprising Archaea: Discovering Another Domain of Life is a popular science book written about the domain Archaea. It was written by John L. Howland and first published in 2000 by the Oxford University Press. The book records the, "archaeal rise from obscurity...to their current prominent place in molecular and evolutionary biology."

== See also ==
- Carl Woese
- Towards a natural system of organisms: proposal for the domains Archaea, Bacteria, and Eucarya
