= Huberarchaeum =

"Candidatus Huberarchaeum"

Scientific classification (Candidatus)
- Domain: Archaea
- Kingdom: Nanobdellati
- Phylum: "Huberarchaeota" corrig. Probst et al. 2018
- Genus: "Ca. Huberarchaeum" corrig. Probst et al. 2018
- Species: "Ca. Huberarchaeum crystalense"

Binomial name
- "Ca. Huberarchaeum crystalense" corrig. Probst et al. 2018

Synonyms
- "Huberarchaea" Probst et al. 2018; "Huberarchaeia" Rinke et al. 2021; "Huberarchaeales" Rinke et al. 2021; "Huberarchaeaceae" Rinke et al. 2021; "Ca. Huberiarchaeum" Probst et al. 2018; "Ca. Huberiarchaeum crystalense" Probst et al. 2018

Monotypic genus of ultra-small archaea

"Candidatus Huberarchaeum" is a monotypic genus of ultra-small archaea that belongs to the monotypic phylum "Huberarchaeota". It contains the sole species "Ca. Huberarchaeum crystalense".
