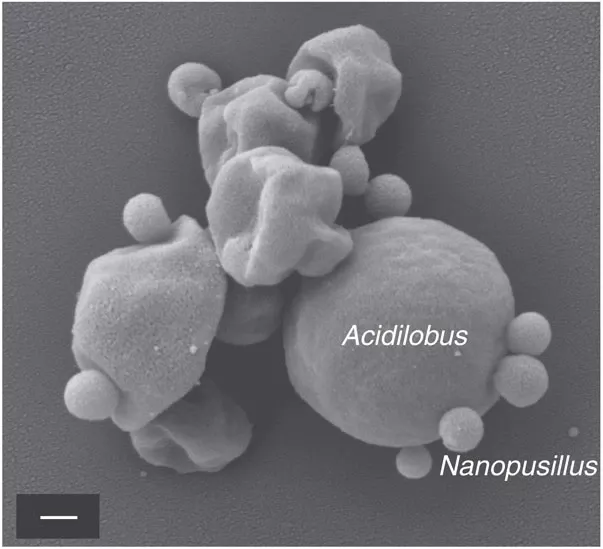
- Nanoarcheotum Nanopusillus acidilobi attached to Acidilobus.

Scientific classification
- Domain: Archaea
- Kingdom: Nanobdellati
- Phylum: Nanobdellota; Huber et al. 2023
- Class: Nanobdellia; Kato et al. 2022

Orders
- "Jingweiarchaeales"; Nanobdellales; "Pacearchaeales"; "Parvarchaeales"; "Tiddalikarchaeales"; "Woesearchaeales"

Synonyms
- "Nanoarchaeota" Huber et al. 2002; "Pacearchaeota" Castelle et al. 2015; "Parvarchaeota" Rinke et al. 2013; "Woesearchaeota" Castelle et al. 2015

= Nanobdellota =

Phylum of archaea

Nanobdellota (previously "Nanoarchaeota", Greek for "dwarf or tiny ancient one") is a phylum of Archaea. The first species discovered, Nanoarchaeum equitans, was from a submarine hydrothermal vent in Iceland and described in 2002. The name of the phylum is derived from the species Nanobdella (Greek nânos, a dwarf; bdella, leech) aerobiophila discovered from a terrestrial hot spring in Japan.

== Discovery and taxonomy ==
By the end of the 1990s, three groups of Archaea were recognised: Crenarchaeota, Euryarchaeota and Korarchaeota. The groups were variously designated as kingdoms or phyla. In 2002, Harald Huber and his colleagues at the University of Regensburg and Max Planck Institute for Medical Research discovered a new archaea from a submarine hot vent in Iceland. The species could not be fitted into any of the known groups so that they created a new phylum "Nanoarchaeota" for the new species they named Nanoarchaeum equitans.

In 2022, Japanese scientists led by Shingo Kato described a new species Nanobdella aerobiophila discovered from a terrestrial hot spring in Japan. For the classification, they created family Nanobdellaceae, order Nanobdellales and class Nanobdellia. In 2023, they introduced a new phylum Nanobdellota for the species. According to the revised International Code of Nomenclature of Prokaryotes (ICNP, Prokaryotic Code) of 2022, the name of a taxon cannot be created using the same spelling of the stem taxon, genus name, which is not validly published. Nanoarchaeota was not a validly published name while Nanobdella is a valid name and thus, Nanobdellota is accepted as the correct name of the phylum, and a new kingdom Nanobdellati was created in 2023.

== Species and diversity ==
Members of the Nanobdellota are associated with different host organisms and environmental conditions. Despite small size, a reduced genome and limited respiration, they have unusual metabolic features. For example, N. equitans has a complex and highly developed intercellular communication system.

The phylogeny of the Nanobdellota is anchored by its only cultured representative, Nanoarchaeum equitans, which clusters in a separate evolutionary group than other archaea, which have recently been reclassified. Further analysis has shown that N. equitans diverged early on in the evolution of Archaea, as indicated by the 16S rRNA sequence. This suggests that they occupy a deeply branching position within this group.

The currently accepted taxonomy is based on the List of Prokaryotic names with Standing in Nomenclature (LPSN) and the National Center for Biotechnology Information (NCBI).

Phylogeny of Nanobdellota

- - - - "Tiddalikarchaeales"
        - "Tiddalikarchaeaceae"
          "Ca. Tiddalikarchaeum anstoanum"
    - - - "Jingweiarchaeales"
          - "Jingweiarchaeaceae"
            "Ca. Jingweiarchaeum tengchongense"
        - "JAPDLS01"
          - "Haiyanarchaeaceae"
            "Ca. Haiyanarchaeum thermophilum"
      - - "Parvarchaeales"
          - "Parvarchaeaceae"
            - "Ca. Rehaiarchaeum fermentans"
            - - "Ca. Acidifodinimicrobium mancum"
              - - "Ca. Parvarchaeum"
                  - "Ca. P. paracidiphilum"
                  - - "Ca. P. acidiphilum"
                    - "Ca. P. tengchongense"
  - - - "Pacearchaeales"
      - "Woesearchaeales"
    - - Nanobdellales
        - "Nanoarchaeaceae"
          "Nanoarchaeum equitans"
        - Nanobdellaceae
          - "Ca. Nanoclepta minuta"
          - - Nanobdella
              - N. aerobiophila
              - - "Ca. Nanopusillus acidilobi"
                - "Ca. Nanopusillus stetteri"

- Class Nanobdellia Kato et al. 2022 ["Nanoarchaea" Huber et al. 2011; "Nanoarchaeia" Vazquez-Campos et al. 2021]
  - Order "Tiddalikarchaeales" Vazquez-Campos et al. 2021
    - Family "Tiddalikarchaeaceae" Vazquez-Campos et al. 2021
      - Genus "Candidatus Tiddalikarchaeum" Vazquez-Campos et al. 2021
        - "Ca. T. anstoanum" Vazquez-Campos et al. 2021
  - Order "Jingweiarchaeales" Rao et al. 2023
    - Family "Jingweiarchaeaceae" Rao et al. 2023
      - Genus "Candidatus Jingweiarchaeum" Rao et al. 2023
        - "Ca. J. tengchongense" Rao et al. 2023
  - Order "Parvarchaeales" Rinke et al. 2020
    - Family "Parvarchaeaceae" Rinke et al. 2020 ["Acidifodinimicrobiaceae" Luo et al. 2020]
      - Genus "Candidatus Rehaiarchaeum" Rao et al. 2023
        - "Ca. R. fermentans" Rao et al. 2023
      - Genus "Candidatus Acidifodinimicrobium" Luo et al. 2020
        - "Ca. A. mancum" Luo et al. 2020
      - Genus "Candidatus Parvarchaeum" Baker et al. 2010
        - "Ca. P. acidiphilum" Baker et al. 2010
        - "Ca. P. paracidiphilum" corrig. Baker et al. 2010
        - "Ca. P. tengchongense" Rao et al. 2023
  - Order Nanobdellales Kato et al. 2022 [Nanoarchaeales Huber et al. 2011]
    - Family "Nanoarchaeaceae" Huber et al. 2011
      - Genus "Nanoarchaeum" Huber et al. 2002
        - "N. equitans" Huber et al. 2002
    - Family Nanobdellaceae Kato et al. 2022 ["Nanopusillaceae" Huber et al. 2011]
      - Genus Nanobdella Kato et al. 2022
        - N. aerobiophila Kato et al. 2022
      - Genus "Candidatus Nanoclepta" St. John et al. 2019
        - "Ca. N. minuta" St. John et al. 2019
      - Genus "Candidatus Nanopusillus" Wurch et al. 2016
        - "Ca. N. acidilobi" Wurch et al. 2016
        - ?"Ca. N. massiliensis" Hassani et al. 2022
        - ?"Ca. N. phoceensis" Hassani et al. 2024
        - "Ca. N. stetteri" (Castelle et al. 2015) Rinke et al. 2020
  - Family "Haiyanarchaeaceae" Rao et al. 2023
    - Genus "Candidatus Haiyanarchaeum" Rao et al. 2023
      - "Ca. H. thermophilum" Rao et al. 2023

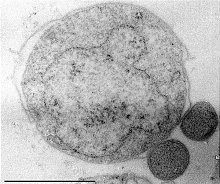
Nanoarchaeum equitans

== Characteristics ==
Cells of N. equitans are spherical with a diameter of approximately 400 nm, and have a very short and compact DNA sequence with the entire genome containing only 490,885 base pairs. While they have the genetic code to carry out processing and repair, they cannot carry out certain biosynthetic and metabolic processes such as lipid, amino-acid, cofactor, or nucleotide synthesis. Due to its limited machinery, it is an obligate parasite, the only one known in the Archaea. Because of their unusual ss rRNA sequences, they are difficult to detect using standard polymerase chain reaction methods. Cells of N. equitans contain a normal S-layer with sixfold symmetry with a 15 nm lattice constant.

== Genome structure ==
Small cells between 100 and 400 nm in diameter and highly streamlined genomes of 0.491-0.606 Mbp characterize nanoarchaeotes. The genomes of described nanoarchaeotes demonstrate different degrees of reduction, which is compatible with a host dependent lifestyle. Certain nanaoarchaeotes still have genes for the CRISPR-Cas systems, archaeal flagella, and the gluconeogenesis pathway.

== Habitat ==
Nanoarchaeotes are obligate symbionts that grow attached to an archaeal host known as Ignicoccus. Both terrestrial hot springs and underwater hydrothermal vents have yielded isolates in the genus Nanoarchaeum . However, there is evidence that nanoarcheotes reside in a variety of habitats outside of marine thermal vents. Genetic evidence for members of the Nanoarchaeota has been discovered to be pervasive in terrestrial hot springs and mesophilic hypersaline habitats using primers created based on the sequence of the 16S rRNA gene of Nanoarchaeum equitans. In addition, the discovery of ribosomal sequences in photic-zone water samples taken distant from hydrothermal vents raises the possibility that Nanoarchaeota are an ubiquitous and diversified group of Archaea that can live in habitats with a variety of temperatures and geochemical settings.

== Metabolism ==
Although much of the metabolism of members of the Nanoarchaeota is unknown, its host is an autotroph that grows on elemental sulphur as an electron acceptor and H_{2} as an electron donor. The majority of recognized metabolic processes, such as the creation of monomers like amino acids, nucleotides, and coenzymes, lack recognizable genes in this organism.

== See also ==
- List of Archaea genera
