= Archaeocin =

Potential Archae-derived antibiotics

Archaeocin is the name given to a new type of potentially useful antibiotic that is derived from the Archaea group of organisms. Eight archaeocins have been partially or fully characterized, but hundreds of archaeocins are believed to exist, especially within the haloarchaea. Production of these archaeal proteinaceous antimicrobials is a nearly universal feature of the rod-shaped haloarchaea.

The prevalence of archaeocins from other members of this domain is unknown simply because no one has looked for them. The discovery of new archaeocins hinges on recovery and cultivation of archaeal organisms from the environment. For example, samples from a novel hypersaline field site, Wilson Hot Springs in the Fish Springs National Wildlife Refuge in eastern Utah, recovered 350 halophilic organisms; preliminary analysis of 75 isolates showed that 48 were archaeal and 27 were bacterial.

== Halocins ==
Halocins are classified as either peptide (≤ 10 kDa; 'microhalocins') or protein (> 10 kDa) antibiotics produced by members of the archaeal family Halobacteriaceae. To date, all of the known halocin genes are encoded on megaplasmids (> 100 kbp) and possess typical haloarcheal TATA and BRE promoter regions. Halocin transcripts are leaderless and the translated preproteins or preproproteins are most likely exported using the twin arginine translocation (Tat) pathway, as the Tat signal motif (two adjacent arginine residues) is present within the amino terminus. Halocin genes are almost universally expressed at the transition between exponential and stationary phases of growth; the only exception is halocin H1, which is induced during exponential phase. In contrast, the larger halocin proteins are heat-labile and typically obligately halophilic as they lose their activity (or activity is reduced) when desalted.

=== Microhalocins, peptide halocins ===
Currently, five peptide halocins have been partially or completely characterized at the protein and/or genetic levels: HalS8, HalR1, HalC8, HalH7, and HalU1. These antimicrobial peptides range from ~3 to 7.4 kDa in molecular mass, consisting of 36 to 76 amino acid residues. Two of the microhalocins (HalS8 and HalC8) are produced by proteolytic cleavage from a larger preproprotein by an unknown mechanism. Microhalocins are hydrophobic peptides that remain active even if desalted and/or stored at 4 °C and are fairly insensitive to heat and organic solvents. The first microhalocin to be characterized was HalS8, produced by the uncharacterized haloarchaeon S8a isolated from the Great Salt Lake, UT, USA.

=== Protein halocins ===
Two can be classified as protein halocins: HalH1 and HalH4; the molecular masses of the remaining halocins have yet to be elucidated. Halocin H1 is produced by Hfx. mediterranei M2a (formerly strain Xia3), isolated from a solar saltern near Alicante, Spain. It is a 31 kDa protein that is heat-labile, loses activity when desalted, and exhibits a broad range of inhibition within the haloarchaea. Halocin H1 has yet to be characterized at the protein and genetic levels. In contrast, HalH4, produced by Hfx. mediterranei R4 (ATCC 33500), also isolated from a solar saltern near Alicante, Spain was the first halocin discovered. The molecular mass of the mature HalH4 protein is 34.9 kDa (359 amino acids), processed from a preprotein of 39.6 kDa; the mechanism for processing is unknown. Halocin H4 is an archaeolytic halocin and adsorbs to sensitive Hbt. salinarum cells where it may be disrupting membrane permeability.

== Sulfolobicins ==
The archaeocins produced by Sulfolobus are entirely different from halocins, since their activity is predominantly associated with the cells and not the supernatant. To date, the spectrum of sulfolobicin activity appears to be restricted to other members of the Sulfolobales: the sulfolobicin inhibited S. solfataricus P1, S. shibatae B12, and six nonproducing strains of S. islandicus. Activity appears to be archaeocidal but not archaeolytic. Two genes involved in sulfolobicin production have been identified in S. acidocaldarius and S. tokodaii. The sulfolobicins appear to represent a novel class of antimicrobial proteins.

== See also ==
- Archaea
