= Microcaldus =

Scientific classification
- Domain: Archaea
- Kingdom: Nanobdellati
- Phylum: Microcaldota; Sakai et al. 2023
- Class: Microcaldia; Sakai et al. 2023
- Order: Microcaldales; Sakai et al. 2023
- Family: Microcaldaceae; Sakai et al. 2023
- Genus: Microcaldus; Sakai et al. 2023
- Species: M. variisymbioticus

Binomial name
- Microcaldus variisymbioticus Sakai et al. 2023

Genus of ultra-small archaea

Microcaldus is a monotypic genus of ultra-small archaea. It contains one species, Microcaldus variisymbioticus. It is in the monotypic family Microcaldaceae, monotypic order Microcaldales, monotypic class Microcaldia and monotypic phylum Microcaldota. Its name is due to being able to live symbiotically with other microbes.
