= Nanohalarchaeota =

Scientific classification (Candidatus)
- Domain: Archaea
- Kingdom: Nanobdellati
- Phylum: "Candidatus Nanohalarchaeota" corrig. Rinke et al. 2013

Classes
- "Ca. Nanohalobiia" (Note: Spelling corrected from: Nanohalobia); "Ca. Nanohaloarchaea"

Synonyms
- Nanohaloarchaeota Rinke et al. 2013

Class of archaea

Nanohalarchaeota is a phylum of diminutive archaea with small genomes and limited metabolic capabilities, belonging to kingdom Nanobdellati. They are ubiquitous in hypersaline habitats, which they share with the extremely halophilic haloarchaea.

Nanohaloarchaea were first identified from metagenomic data as a class of uncultivated halophilic archaea composed of six clades and were subsequently placed in the phylum Nanohalarchaeota within the DPANN clade (kingdom Nanobdellati). However, the phylogenetic position of nanohaloarchaea is still highly debated, being alternatively proposed as the sister-lineage of haloarchaea or a member of the Nanobdellati kingdom.

The lineage has since been identified in data from a range of hypersaline environments including: Australian thalassohaline lake, Spanish saltern, Russian soda brine, Californian saltern, Chilean halite, and Ethiopian Dallol hydrothermal system. Like most other members of DPANN, they are only known to live with a host (specifically a similarly halophilic archaeon) in symbiosis. The exact nature of this interaction with the host vary among species, from mutualism to parasitic predation.

== Viruses ==
Several species of nanhoaloarchaea encode CRISPR-Cas systems suggesting that they are parasitized by viruses. Consistently, metagenomic analysis has revealed that nanohaloarchaea are associated with diverse viruses. These viruses belong to four morphologically different groups, including those with head-tailed (class Caudoviricetes), tailless icoahedral (realm Singelaviria), enveloped pleomorphic and spindle-shaped virions. Currently known nanohaloarchaeal viruses have been classified into seven distinct families.

== Taxonomy ==
The currently accepted taxonomy is based on the List of Prokaryotic names with Standing in Nomenclature (LPSN) and National Center for Biotechnology Information (NCBI).

Phylogeny of Nanohalobiales

- - - "Nanohalalkaliarchaeaceae"
      "Ca. Nanohalalkaliarchaeum"
    - "Nanoanaerosalinaceae"
      - "Ca. Asbonarchaeum"
      - "Ca. Nanoanaerosalina"
  - - "Nanohalobiaceae"
      - "Ca. Nanosalinicola"
      - - "Ca. Nanohalococcus"
        - - "Ca. Nanosalina"
          - - "Ca. Nanohalobium"
            - "Ca. Nanohalovita"

Phylum "Nanohalarchaeota" corrig. Rinke et al. 2013

- Class "Nanohalarchaeia" corrig. Narasingarao et al. 2012
  - Order "Nanohalarchaeales"
    - Family "Nanohalarchaeaceae"
      - Genus ?"Candidatus Nanohalarchaeum" corrig. Hamm et al. 2019
        - "Ca. N. antarcticum" corrig. Hamm et al. 2019
      - Genus ?"Candidatus Nanopetraeus" corrig. Crits‐Christoph et al. 2016 ["Nanopetramus" (sic)]
        - "Ca. N. primus" corrig. Crits‐Christoph et al. 2016
  - Order "Nanohydrothermales" Xie et al. 2022
    - Family "Nanohydrothermaceae" Xie et al. 2022
      - Genus ?"Candidatus Nanohydrothermus" Xie et al. 2022
        - "Ca. N. guaymasensis" Xie et al. 2022
  - Order "Nucleotidisoterales" Xie et al. 2022
    - Family "Nanosalenecaceae" Xie et al. 2022
      - Genus ?"Candidatus Nanosalenecus" Xie et al. 2022
        - "Ca. N. halilacustris" Xie et al. 2022
    - Family "Nucleotidisoteraceae" Xie et al. 2022
      - Genus ?"Candidatus Nucleotidisoter" Xie et al. 2022
        - "Ca. N. xinjiangensis" Xie et al. 2022
    - Family "Nucleotidivindicaceae" Xie et al. 2022
      - Genus ?"Candidatus Nucleotidivindex" Xie et al. 2022
        - "Ca. N. qijiaojingensis" Xie et al. 2022
- Class "Nanohalobiia" corrig. La Cono et al. 2020 ["Nanosalinia" Rinke et al. 2021]
  - Order "Nanohalobiales" La Cono et al. 2020 ["Nanosalinales" Rinke et al. 2020]
    - Family "Nanoanaerosalinaceae" Zhao et al. 2022
      - Genus "Candidatus Asbonarchaeum" Baker et al. 2024
        - "Ca. A. danakilense" Baker et al. 2024
      - Genus "Candidatus Nanoanaerosalina" Zhao et al. 2022
        - "Ca. N. halalkaliphila" Zhao et al. 2022
    - Family "Nanohalalkaliarchaeaceae" Zhao et al. 2022
      - Genus "Candidatus Nanohalalkaliarchaeum" Zhao et al. 2022
        - "Ca. N. halalkaliphilum" Zhao et al. 2022
    - Family "Nanohalobiaceae" La Cono et al. 2020 ["Nanosalinaceae" Rinke et al. 2020]
      - Genus ?"Candidatus Haloredivivus" Ghai et al. 2011
        - "Ca. N. primus" corrig. Ghai et al. 2011
      - Genus "Candidatus Nanohalobium" La Cono et al. 2020
        - "Ca. N. constans" La Cono et al. 2020
      - Genus "Candidatus Nanohalococcus" Reva et al. 2023
        - "Ca. N. occultus" Reva et al. 2023
      - Genus "Candidatus Nanohalovita" Reva et al. 2023
        - "Ca. N. haloferacivicina" Reva et al. 2023
      - Genus "Candidatus Nanosalina" Narasingarao et al. 2012
        - "Ca. N. primus" corrig. Narasingarao et al. 2012
      - Genus "Candidatus Nanosalinicola" corrig. Narasingarao et al. 2012 ["Nanosalinarum" (sic)]
        - "Ca. N. primus" corrig. Narasingarao et al. 2012

== See also ==
- List of Archaea genera
