= Methanopyri =

Scientific classification
- Domain: Archaea
- Kingdom: Methanobacteriati
- Phylum: Methanobacteriota
- Class: Methanopyri; Garrity & Holt 2002

Order
- Methanopyrales

Synonyms
- "Methanopyria" Oren, Parte & Garrity 2016

Class of archaea

Methanopyri is a class of archaeans in the phylum Methanobacteriota.

== See also ==
- List of Archaea genera
