= Altarchaeum =

"Candidatus Altarchaeum"

Scientific classification (Candidatus)
- Domain: Archaea
- Kingdom: Nanobdellati corrig. Seitz et al., 2016
- Phylum: "Altarchaeota" corrig. Probst et al., 2014
- Order: "Altarchaeales" corrig. Probst et al., 2014
- Family: "Altarchaeaceae" corrig. Probst et al., 2014
- Genus: "Ca. Altarchaeum" corrig. Probst et al., 2014

Type species
- "Ca. Altarchaeum hamiconexum" corrig. Probst et al. 2014

Species
- "Ca. A. crystalense"; "Ca. A. hamiconexum"; "Ca. A. horonobense"

Synonyms
- "Altiarchaeota" Seitz et al., 2016; "Altarchaeia" Dong et al., 2022; "Altarchaeia" Rinke et al., 2021; "Altiarchaeia" Chuvochina et al., 2023; "Altiarchaeales" Probst et al., 2014; "Altiarchaeaceae" Probst et al., 2018

Monotypic genus of ultra-small archaea

"Candidatus Altarchaeum" is a monotypic genus of ultra-small archaea. It contains the sole species "Ca. Altarchaeum hamiconexum". It is in the monotypic family "Altarchaeaceae", monotypic order "Altarchaeales" and monotypic phylum "Altarchaeota".
