= Hadesarchaea =

Scientific classification
- Domain: Archaea
- Kingdom: Methanobacteriati
- Phylum: "Hadarchaeota"; Chuvochina et al. 2019

Classes
- "Persephonarchaeia"; "Hadarchaeia"

Synonyms
- "Hadesarchaeota" (sic) McGonigle et al. 2019; "Stygia" Adam et al. 2017

Class of archaea

Hadesarchaea, formerly called the South-African Gold Mine Miscellaneous Euryarchaeal Group, is a class of thermophile microorganisms that have been found in deep mines, hot springs, marine sediments, and other subterranean environments.

== Nomenclature ==
These archaea were initially called South-African Gold Mine Miscellaneous Euryarchaeal Group (SAGMEG), after their initial site of discovery. The name Hadesarchaea was proposed by Baker et al. in 2016, a reference to the Greek god of the underworld.

== Phylogeny ==
Previously, Hadesarchaea (or SAGMEG) were only known to exist through their distinctive phylogenetic position in the tree of life. In 2016, scientists using metagenomic shotgun sequencing were able to assemble several near-full genomes of these archaea. It was shown that the genome of Hadesarchaea is approximately 1.5 Megabase pairs in size, which is about 0.5 Mbp smaller than most archaea. These archaea have not been successfully cultivated in the laboratory, but their metabolic properties have been inferred from the genomic reconstructions. Hadesarchaea may have evolved from a methanogenic ancestor based on the genetic similarity with other methanogenic organisms.

== Taxonomy ==
- "Persephonarchaeia" corrig. Mwirichia et al. 2016 (MSBL-1)
- "Hadarchaeia" Chuvochina et al. 2019 ["Hadesarchaea" Baker et al. 2016] (SAGMEG)
  - "Hadarchaeales" Chuvochina et al. 2019 ["Hadesarchaeales" Hua et al. 2019]
    - "Cerberiarchaeaceae" Benito Merino et al. 2024
      - "Candidatus Cerberiarchaeum" Benito Merino et al. 2024
        - "Ca. C. oleivorans" Benito Merino et al. 2024
      - "Candidatus Melinoarchaeum" Yu et al. 2024
        - "Ca. M. fermentans" Yu et al. 2024
    - "Hadarchaeaceae" Chuvochina et al. 2019 ["Hadesarchaeaceae" corrig. Hua et al. 2019]
      - "Candidatus Hadarchaeum" Chuvochina et al. 2019
        - "Ca. H. yellowstonense" Chuvochina et al. 2019
      - "Candidatus Hadesarchaeum" Hua et al. 2019
        - "Ca. H. tengchongensis" Hua et al. 2019
      - "Candidatus Methanourarchaeum" Hua et al. 2019
        - "Ca. M. thermotelluricum" Hua et al. 2019

== Habitat and metabolism ==
These microbes were first discovered in a gold mine in South Africa at a depth of approximately 3 km (2 mi), where they are able to live without oxygen or light. They were later also found in the White Oak River estuary in North Carolina and in Yellowstone National Park's Lower Culex Basin. These areas are approximately 70 °C (158 °F) and highly alkaline. Based on phylogenetic marker gene survey, Hadesarchaeota might be present in soils in ancient mining areas in East Harz region, Germany.

The microbes have been found in other marine environments as well. Some of these areas include cold seep systems in the South China Sea. Hadesarchaea has been found to be a dominant member of the archaeal community in the area. These cold seeps contain gas hydrate bearing sediments in which microbes play a major role in biogeochemical cycling. It is believed that Hadesarchaea is involved in the reaction of carbon dioxide with water in this environment. Hadesarchaea have also been found in subseafloor habitats located in the Guaymas Basin and Sonora Margin around the Gulf of California.

In addition to being present in marine sediments, mines, and hot springs, Hadesarchaea has been identified in the gut microbiome of certain fish species. The freshwater pufferfish (Tetraodon cutcutia), native to India, Assam, Bihar, and West Bengal, was found to have Hadesarchaea present in their gut microbiome. Hadesarchaea was found to be in the second most abundant in the archaeal community of the freshwater pufferfish. This was found to be similar to community abundance found in the gut of carnivorous Salmon and herbivorous grass carp. While Hadesarchaea are found to be in such high abundance for these environments, it is not completely known how they influence the health and trophic level of these fish.

Hadesarchaea are unique among known archaea in that they can convert carbon monoxide and water to carbon dioxide and oxygen, producing hydrogen as a by-product. From metagenome-assembled genome (MAG) data, Hadesarchaea possess genes associated with Wood-Ljungdahl carbon fixation pathway, methanogenesis and alkane metabolism. Hadesarchaeal genomes have also been reported to contain genes that enable them to metabolize sugars and amino acids in a heterotrophic lifestyle, and perform dissimilatory nitrite reduction to ammonium. Initial research suggests that these organisms are also involved in significant geochemical processes.

Because of their relatively small genome, it is assumed that the genomes of Hadesarchaea have been subjected to genome streamlining, possibly as a result of nutrient limitation.

== See also ==
- Archea
- Microbiology
- Fermentative hydrogen production
- Thermophiles
- Geysers
- List of Archaea genera
