= Aenigmatarchaeum =

"Candidatus Aenigmatarchaeum"

Scientific classification (Candidatus)
- Domain: Archaea
- Kingdom: Nanobdellati
- Phylum: "Aenigmatarchaeota"
- Class: "Aenigmatarchaeia"; Rinke et al. 2021
- Order: "Aenigmatarchaeales"; Rinke et al. 2021
- Family: "Aenigmatarchaeaceae"; Rinke et al. 2021
- Genus: "Ca. Aenigmatarchaeum" corrig. Rinke et al. 2013
- Species: "Ca. Aenigmatarchaeum subterraneum"

Binomial name
- "Ca. Aenigmatarchaeum subterraneum" corrig. Rinke et al. 2013

Synonyms
- "Ca. Aenigmarchaeum" Rinke et al. 2013; "Ca. Aenigmarchaeum subterraneum" Rinke et al. 2013

Monotypic genus of ultra-small archaea

"Candidatus Aenigmatarchaeum" is a monotypic genus of ultra-small archaea that belongs to the monotypic phylum "Aenigmatarchaeota". It contains the sole species "Ca. Aenigmatarchaeum subterraneum".
