= Micrarchaeota =

Scientific classification
- Domain: Archaea
- Kingdom: Nanobdellati
- Phylum: Micrarchaeota; Baker & Dick 2013

Class
- "Micrarchaeia"

Phylum of Archaea

Micrarchaeota are a phylum of ultra-small archaea. This phylum was originally discovered via genomic investigation of acid drainage from a mine, and this species was referred to as ARMAN-2 in the literature. Micrarchaeota are a part of the DPANN super phylum and the kingdom Nanobdellati. The phylum is thought to contain at least 2 families and 12 genera.

This phylum is characterised by its incredibly small cell size and genome. A Micrarchaeum genome is roughly 1mbp long, and on average codes for 912 different genes. This phylum is anaerobic (or perhaps micro-aerobic, meaning that they can withstand micro quantities of oxygen) and appears to have co-evolved with Thermoplasmatales, due to Micrarchaeota often being in mutualistic relationships with Thermoplasmatales. Whilst many species of the Nanobdellati are host-dependent, and multiple species of Micrarchaeota such as ARMAN-2, and ca. M. harzensis are known to be host dependent, other species within Micrarchaeota such as Sv326 are thought to be free-living organisms. This illustrates the diversity of the phylum, and highlights the need to research this phylum further.

This phylum has been discovered in a surprisingly varied number of habitats including: acid mine drainage; hot spring habitats; peat bogs; soil; hypersaline mats; and freshwater habitats.

This phylum is relatively under-researched, most of the information about this phylum has been derived from sequences found in the environment and through the study a small number of species that have been cultured, such as M. harzensis.

== Metabolic potential ==
Many observed members of the phylum is missing core metabolic pathways, such as limited genes required for glycolysis and a lack of biosynthesis pathways for some key amino acids, thereby necessitating them to acquire these amino acids from the host or environment. Many species within this phylum are thought to be unable to synthesise nucleotides de novo Different genera within the phylum are missing different pathways, which allows this phylum to inhabit a number of different niches and environments. Some members of the phylum are believed to be free-living as their genome contains all the genes required for core biosynthetic pathways (including being able to code for all amino acids) and at least one species is thought to be capable of fermentation (Sv326).

=== Stress response ===
A number of Micrarcheota genomes have been observed to contain genes involved in responding to a variety of stressors, including but not limited to: antibiotics; heat stress; heavy metals; and oxidative stress. This includes 15 genomes which were found to contain a gene that codes for a fosmidomycin resistance protein. Fosmidomycin is an antibiotic that prevents isoprenoid biosynthesis. Furthermore, 3 genomes were found to contain genes that code for a lytic murine transglycoslase which could be transported outside of the cell, allowing the Micrarchaeota to target bacteria.

== CRISPR systems ==
A number of different CRISPR-cas anti-viral systems have been observed in the phylum Micrarchaeota.

== Ecological roles ==
The ecological roles of this phylum are currently unknown. Genomes belonging to this phylum have included genes involved with iron, carbon and nitrogen cycling, however, their exact roles in ecosystems are unknown.

A study on the composition of hot spring microbial communities found that Micrarchaeota formed synergies with 7 different Bacterial partners. The Micrarcheota was found to be a central hub in a network of microorganisms, and took in a variety of essential metabloites from its bacterial partners. The Micrarchaeota was theorised to be supplying carbohydrates in return. As this was a metagenomic study, it did not identify the symbiotic host of this Micrarcheota.

This phylum has been discovered in a surprisingly varied number of habitats including: acid mine drainage; hot spring habitats; peat bogs; soil; hypersaline mats; and freshwater habitats.

=== Phylogeny ===
The currently accepted taxonomy is based on the List of Prokaryotic names with Standing in Nomenclature (LPSN) and National Center for Biotechnology Information (NCBI).

53 marker proteins based GTDB 11-RS232

- "Micrarchaeia"
  - - "Norongarragalinales"
      - "Norongarragalinaceae"
        "Ca. Norongarragalina"
  - - - "Micrarchaeales"
        - "Micrarchaeaceae"
          - "Ca. Mancarchaeum"
          - "Ca. Micrarchaeum"
    - - "Anstonellales"
        - "Anstonellaceae"
          "Ca. Anstonella"
        - "Bilamarchaeaceae"
          "Ca. Bilamarchaeum"
      - "Burarchaeales"
        - - "Gugararchaeaceae"
            "Ca. Gugararchaeum"
        - - "Burarchaeaceae"
            "Ca. Burarchaeum"
          - "Fermentimicrarchaeaceae"
            "Ca. Fermentimicrarchaeum"

== Species ==
=== Observed species: M. harzensis ===
A member of this phylum ca. Micrarchaeum harzensis has been observed living in a stable co-culture with another archaea (a Thermoplasmatales), where these two organisms create a biofilm. It is theorised that M. harzensis contributes to the composition of the extracellular matrix.

M. harzensis did not appear to have a major impact on the growth rate of its host Ca. Scheffleriplasma hospitalis, suggesting a commensal or mutualistic relationship. M. harzensis did causes a change in gene expression of S. hospitalis, such as a reduction in the expression of genes involved in carbohydrate importation into the cell.

==== Membrane composition ====
A lipid known as GDGT-0 makes up 97% of the membrane of M. harzensis, with the remainder being composed of Archaeol. It is notable that this membrane composition is identical to that of the Thermoplasmatales host. This means that the Micrarcheota typically have a lipid monolayer, as GDGT has two polar head groups, ensuring that a monolayer will form.

This membrane is protected by a protein S-layer, in the species M.harzensis, and this is speculated to be a feature common across the phyla.

=== Free-living species: Sv326 ===
In contrast to ca M. harzensis, which has been shown living in a close relationship with a host archaea, with a resulting lack of core biosynthetic pathways, the Sv326 species is theorised to be free-living.

Sv326 acquired its name as its genome was discovered in the freshwater lake Svetloe in Russia, which has a high concentration of methane and ferrous iron, combined with a low concentration of sulphate in the anoxic zone.

Sv326 has a genome that is 1.17mbp long and could potentially code for 1362 different proteins. The genome contains genes coding for the synthesis of all 20 amino acids. It is speculated to be a fermentor.
