= Caldarchaeol =

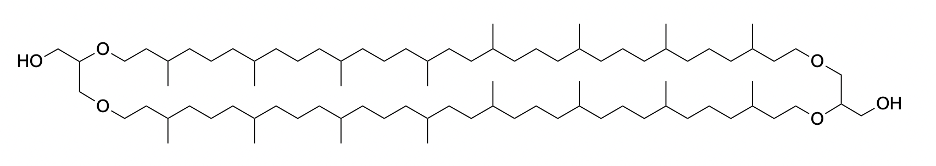

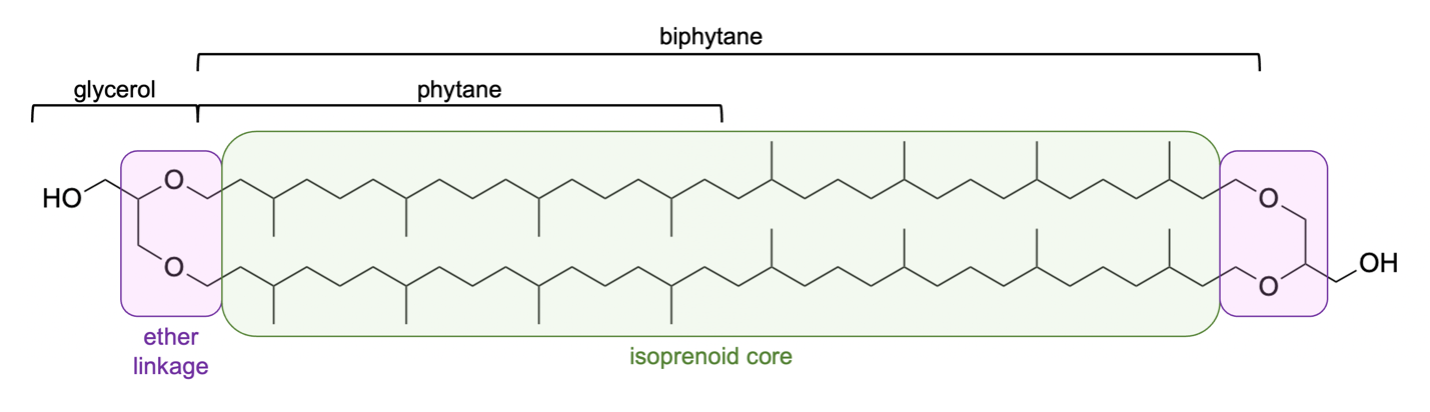

Names
- Preferred IUPAC name [(2R,7R,11R,15S,19S,22S,26S,30R,34R,38R,43R,47R,51S,55S,58S,62S,66R,70R)-7,11,15,19,22,26,30,34,43,47,51,55,58,62,66,70-Hexadecamethyl-1,4,37,40-tetraoxacyclodoheptacontane-2,38-diyl]dimethanol
- Other names: Dibiphytanyl diglycerol tetraether; GDGT-0

Identifiers
CAS Number	99529-31-4
3D model (JSmol)	Interactive image
ChemSpider	4696841
PubChem CID	5771745
UNII	R9Z2TK9HCG
- InChI: InChI=1S/C86H172O6/c1-69-29-17-33-73(5)41-25-49-81(13)57-61-89-67-85(65-87)91-63-59-83(15)52-28-44-76(8)36-20-32-72(4)40-24-48-80(12)56-54-78(10)46-22-38-70(2)30-18-34-74(6)42-26-50-82(14)58-62-90-68-86(66-88)92-64-60-84(16)51-27-43-75(7)35-19-31-71(3)39-23-47-79(11)55-53-77(9)45-21-37-69/h69-88H,17-68H2,1-16H3/t69-,70-,71-,72-,73+,74+,75+,76+,77-,78-,79-,80-,81+,82+,83+,84+,85+,86+/m0/s1 Key: VMHUDYKDOMRJOK-QUYWEVSVSA-N
- SMILES: CC1CCCC(CCCC(CCOCC(OCCC(CCCC(CCCC(CCCC(CCC(CCCC(CCCC(CCCC(CCOCC(OCCC(CCCC(CCCC(CCCC(CCC(CCC1)C)C)C)C)C)CO)C)C)C)C)C)C)C)C)CO)C)C

Properties
Chemical formula	C_{86}H_{172}O_{6}
Molar mass	1302.28 g/mol
- Except where otherwise noted, data are given for materials in their standard state (at 25 °C [77 °F], 100 kPa). verify (what is ?) Infobox references

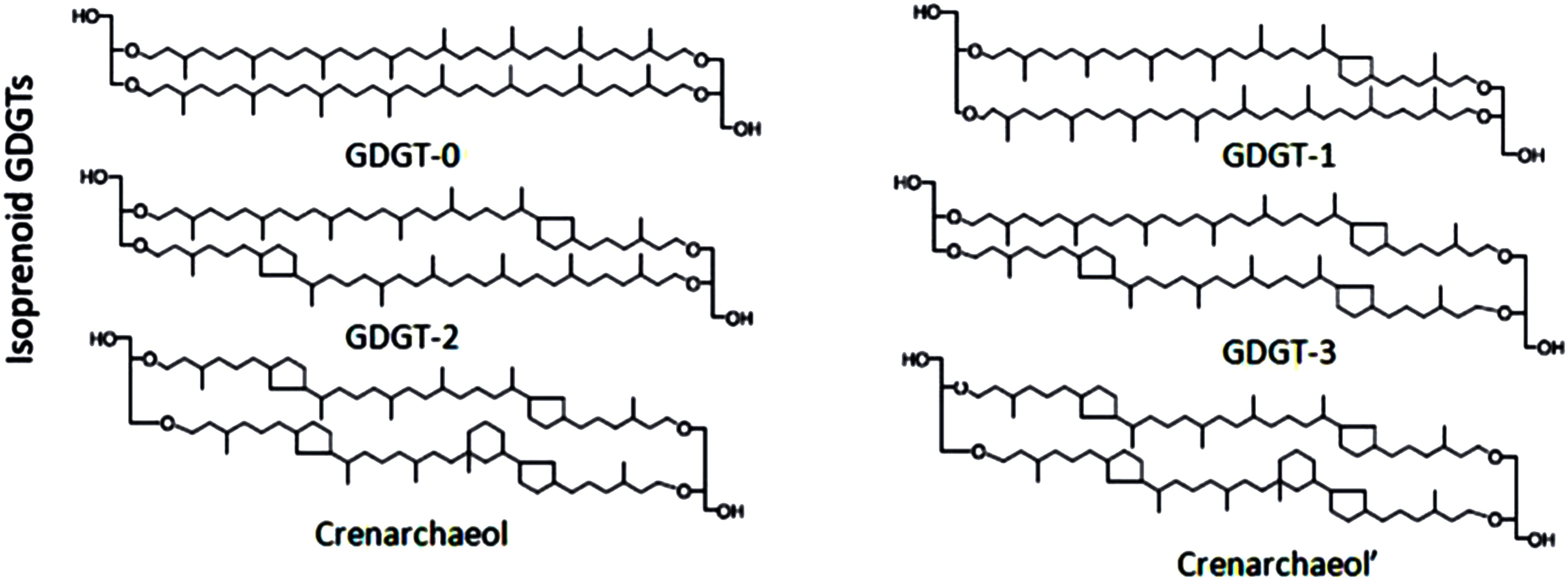
Molecular structures of iGDGTs containing 0 to 4 cyclopentane rings (GDGT-0 to GDGT-4).

Caldarchaeol is a membrane-spanning lipid of the isoprenoid glycerol dialkyl glycerol tetraether (iGDGT) class, produced and used by archaea. Membranes made up of caldarchaeol are more stable since the hydrophobic chains are linked together (as compared to lipid bilayer structures in eukaryotes and bacteria), allowing archaea to withstand extreme conditions.

== Chemical Structure ==
Caldarchaeol is also known as dibiphytanyl diglycerol tetraether, or GDGT-0. Two glycerol units are linked together by two biphytanes, each of which consist of two phytanes linked together to form a linear chain of 32 carbon atoms (40 carbons including methyl branches).

The configuration of the macrocyclic tetraether has been determined by total synthesis of the C40-diol and comparison with a sample obtained by degradation of natural tetraether. A synthesis of tetraether has also been carried out.

Caldarchaeol is not currently described as having any hazards. Due to its high molecular weight, it is neither volatile nor flammable. Caldarchaeol and other GDGTs are present across environments at low concentrations, and no adverse affects or evidence of toxicity are known.

== Nomenclature ==
Nomenclature for archaeal lipids is widely varied across history and fields, and caldarchaeol is no exception. It had originally been defined as dibiphytanyl diglycerol tetraether, a large lipid molecule with two biphytane chains, with or without cyclopentane rings, connected by ethers to glycerols on either end. It is used to describe the entire class of isoprenoid GDGTs in many papers, both historical and recent. However, as GDGTs began to be incorporated into paleoclimate investigations, many began defining caldarchaeol specifically as GDGT-0, the isoprenoid GDGT with no cyclopentane moieties, especially when this specific structure is used in the analysis.

== Biological Sources ==
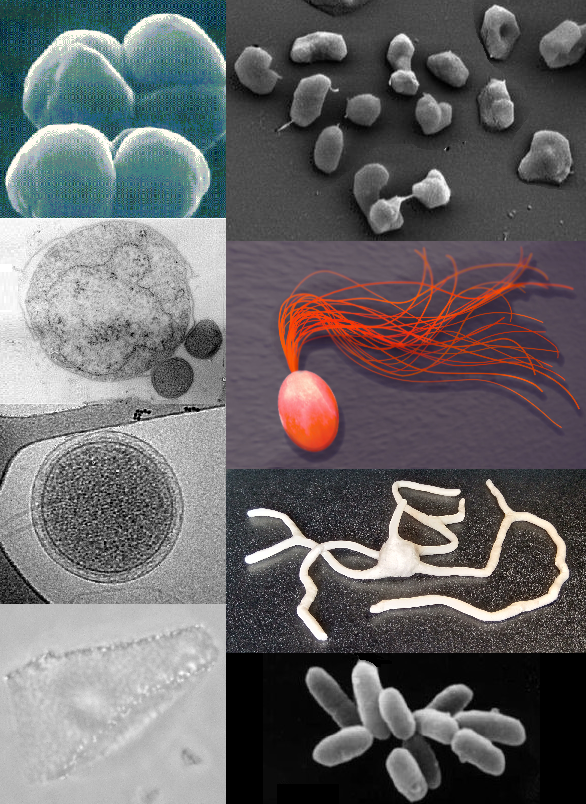
Gallery of various scans and models of archaeal cells

Caldarchaeol is the most widely spread GDGT in the archaea domain, found in every major archaeal clade except halophiles. Caldarchaeol, as well as other GDGTs, were previously thought to be specific to hot environments, partially due to the assumption that archaea are only found at extreme temperatures. However, as archaea continue to be isolated from unexpected places, the discovery of caldarchaeol across temperature, chemical, and physical conditions continues as well.

=== Biosynthesis ===
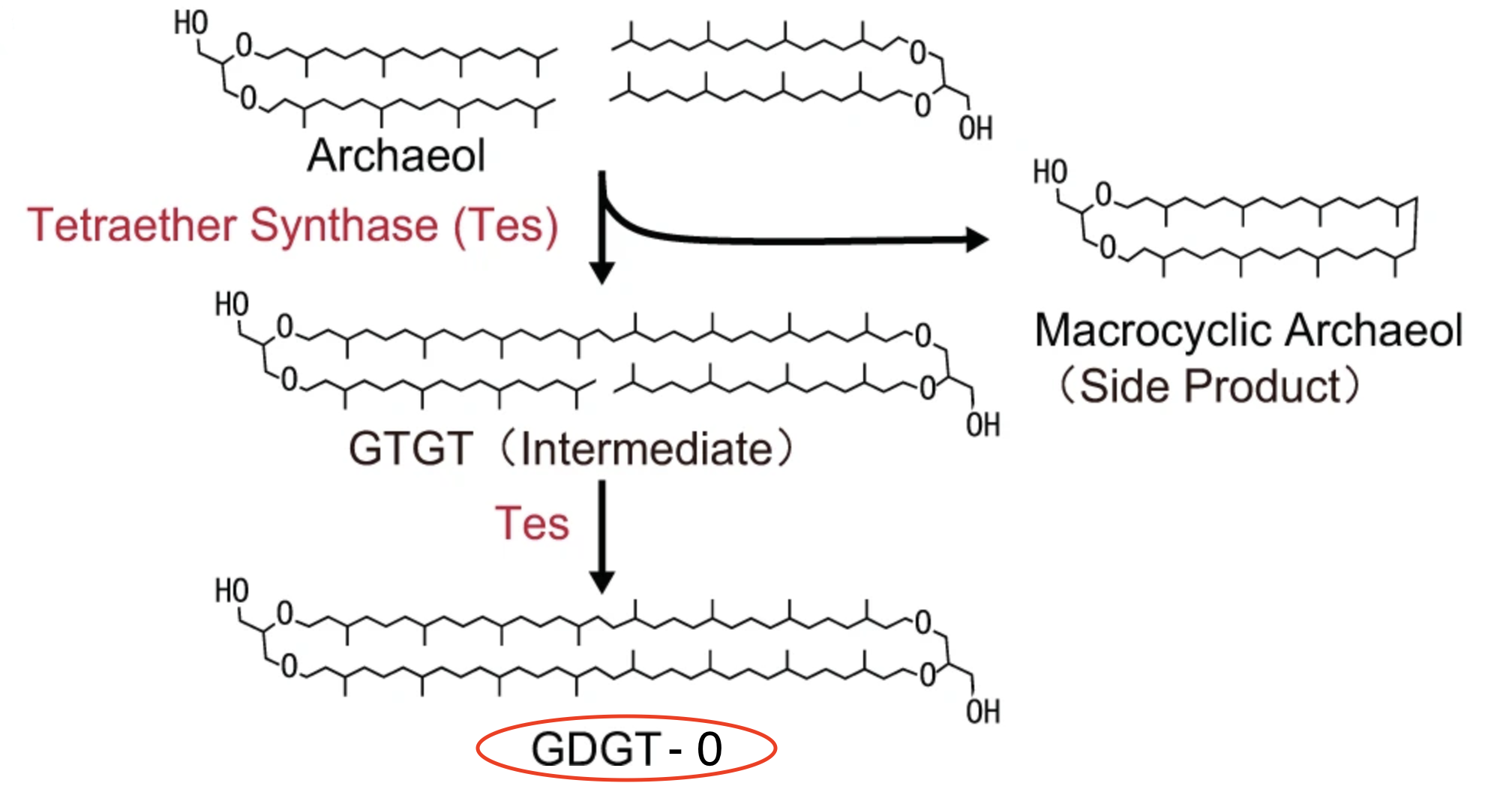
Caldarchaeol (GDGT-0) synthesis from archaeol, image adapted from Zeng et al., 2022

The biosynthesis of caldarchaeol and other iGDGTs has been the subject of investigation for decades, due both to the complexity of the pathway and the difficulty of culturing archaea in laboratory settings. Isoprenoid-based molecules are synthesized by all three domains of life using isopentyl pyrophosphate (IPP) and dimethylallyl pyrophosphate (DMAPP), 5-carbon structural isomers. Archaea make archaeol from these building blocks, which is then condensed into tetraether structures using a radical S-adenosylmethionine (SAM) protein called tetraether synthase (Tes).

== Biomarker Applications ==
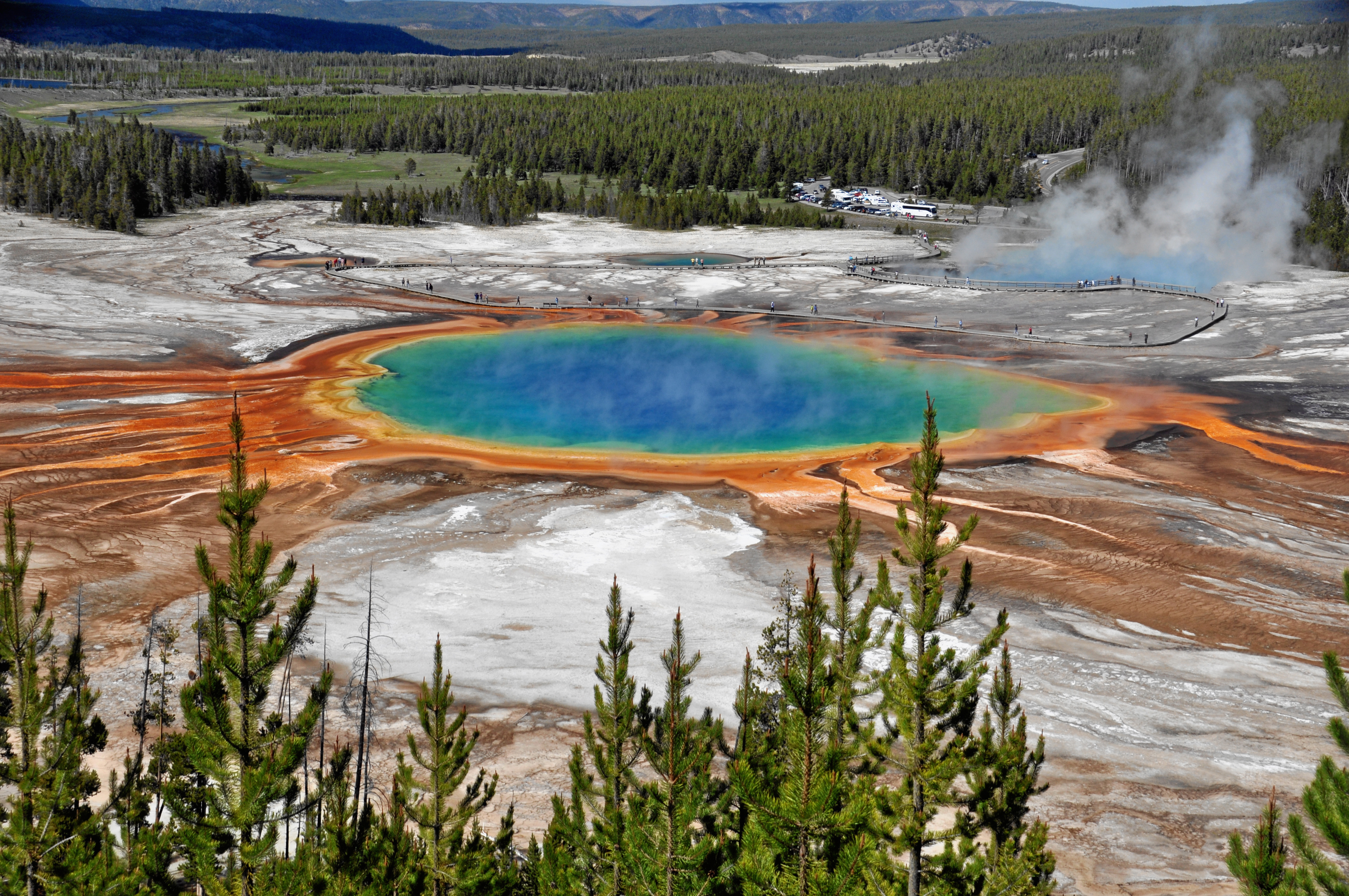
Hot springs such as the Grand Prismatic Spring in Yellowstone National Park, WY are home to many species of archaea.

Caldarchaeol is a widely distributed lipid across archaea, making it a relatively poor biomarker for specific taxa within the domain. However, comparisons between caldarchaeol concentrations and other biomarkers are frequently used to reveal community composition and/or paleoclimate proxies.

=== Caldarchaeol to Crenarchaeol Ratio ===
Formula: Caldarchaeol/Crenarchaeol

- Methanogenic archaea have not been found to synthesize crenarchaeol, but they do produce caldarchaeol
- Used to estimate contribution to iGDGT pool by methanogens (first used in 2009)

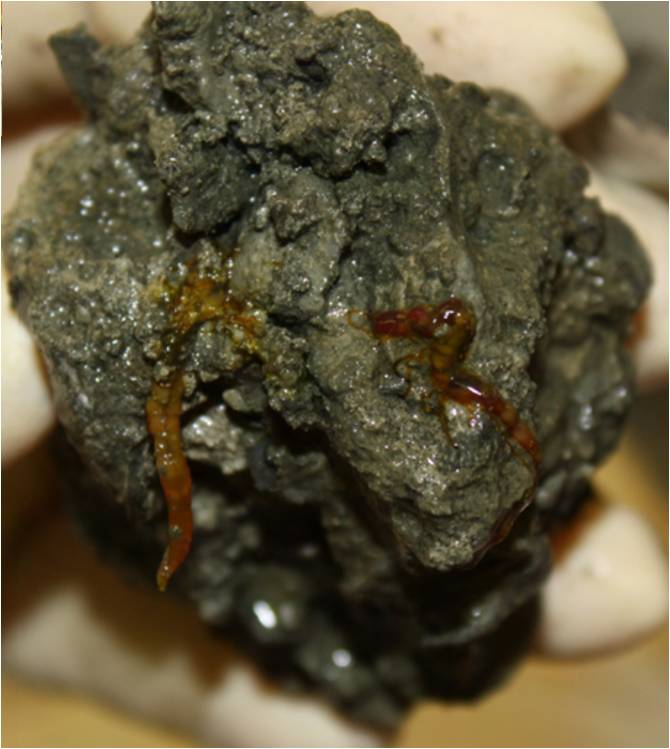
A deep-ocean rock that contained methanotrophic archaea and their iGDGTs

=== Tetraether Index of 86 Carbon Atoms ===
Formula: TEX_{86} = ([GDGT-2] + [GDGT-3] + [Cren']) / ([GDGT-1] + [GDGT-2] + [GDGT-3] + [Cren'])

- The number of rings in iGDGT structures has been correlated to mean annual sea surface temperature
- Used frequently since originally described (first defined in 2002)
- Rather than directly being determined by temperature, the iGDGT ring number has since been found to actually be a function of NH_{3} oxidation rates from microbial growth, which is influenced by temperature
- This metric does not include a term for caldarchaeol due its synthesis by methanogens as well as the crenarchaeota that are meant to be impacting this proxy; however, methanogen growth (and therefore caldarchaeol concentrations) are still affected by temperature
  - To clarify this consideration and quantify the contribution of caldarchaeol to the iGDGT pool, some studies have compared TEX86 to the Ring Index (RI)
    - RI = 0*[GDGT-0] + 1*[GDGT-1] + 2*[GDGT-2] + 3*[GDGT-3] + 4*[Cren] + 4*[Cren']
    - While the caldarchaeol term is multiplied by 0, it impacts the RI value through its impact on the total iGDGT pool and calculations of relative concentrations for other structures

=== Archaeol and Caldarchaeol Ecometric (ACE) ===
Formula: ACE = 100 × ([archaeol] / ([archaeol] + [caldarchaeol]))

- Halophilic archaea do not synthesize caldarchaeol, but they do make archaeol
- Measures contribution of halophilic archaea to samples (first defined in 2011)

== Additional Resources ==
- Focus of research, University of Occupational and Environmental Health, Kitakyushu, Japan
- Monolayer properties of archaeol and caldarchaeol polar lipids of a methanogenic archaebacterium, Methanospirillum hungatei, at the air/water interface. Tomoaia-Cotisel M, Chifu E, Zsako J, Mocanu A, Quinn PJ, Kates M. Chem Phys Lipids. 1992 Nov;63(1-2):131-8
