= Nitrososphaera gargensis =

Scientific classification (Candidatus)
- Domain: Archaea
- Phylum: Thermoproteota
- Class: Nitrososphaeria
- Order: Nitrososphaerales
- Family: Nitrososphaeraceae
- Genus: Nitrososphaera
- Species: Ca. N. gargensis

Binomial name
- Ca. Nitrososphaera gargensis Zhalnina et al. 2014

Species of archaeon

"Candidatus Nitrososphaera gargensis" is a non-pathogenic, small coccus measuring 0.9 ± 0.3 μm in diameter. Ca. N. gargensis is observed in small abnormal cocci groupings and uses its archaella to move via chemotaxis. Being an Archaeon, Ca. N. gargensis has a cell membrane composed of crenarchaeol, its isomer, and a distinct glycerol dialkyl glycerol tetraether (GDGT), which is significant in identifying ammonia-oxidizing archaea (AOA). The organism plays a role in influencing ocean communities and food production.

== Discovery ==
Ca. N. gargensis was discovered in a Garga hot spring in Siberia by Hatzenpichler and associates in 2008. The organism was isolated from a sample taken from the Siberian hot springs that was actually located in a microbial mat. Hatzenpichler et al. later grew the culture aerobically at 46°C with ammonium and bicarbonate. In 2007, the first indications of Ca. N. gargensis were found through testing a hot spring sample for ammonia oxidizers. The researchers found ammonia-oxidizing archaea instead of the expected bacteria with this capability since no previous archaea had been found to be able to complete this process. Through analyzing 16S rRNA gene sequences and performing the scientific methods of catalyzed reporter deposition (CARD)-FISH (fluorescence in situ hybridization) and microautoradiography, the researchers determined that the organism in the sample was an ammonia-oxidizing archaea and classified this organism as Candidatus Nitrososphaera gargensis.

=== Genomics ===
Ca. N. gargensis' genome is 2.83 Mb in size with a GC content of 48%, which is much larger than most other ammonia-oxidizing archaea. The organism encodes for 3565 protein genes and 37 RNA genes. N. gargensis also contains a CRISPR-Cas type I system able to target viral DNA, gene duplications in its chaperones, and numerous transposase genes.

=== Taxonomy and phylogeny ===
Ca. N. gargensis neighbors Nitrosopumilus maritimus and Nitrososphaera viennensis on the phylogenetic tree. Like Ca. N. gargensis, both of these organisms are chemolithoautotrophic ammonia-oxidizers that thrive in hot and humid habitats. Spang et al. elucidated, in 2012, the notable similarities between Ca. N. gargensis and N. viennensis through their nitrification ability and PHA (putatively polyhydroxybutyrate) production along with other elements.

== Nitrification and metabolism ==
As a chemolithoautotroph, Ca. N. gargensis performs aerobic oxidation of ammonia to nitrite and breaks down cyanate for energy. Ca. N. gargensis also encompasses a flexible carbon metabolism, allowing for the uptake of organic material. Nitrification, the process of oxidizing ammonia to nitrate, is a significant step in the nitrogen cycle. Since nitrogen is limited in marine environments, the recent discovery of ammonia-oxidizing archaea proves to be an active source of study for researchers. Ca. N. gargensis possesses ammonia monooxygenase, which is the enzyme that enables the organism the ability to oxidize ammonia, or urea and potentially cyanate as other sources of ammonia.

== Habitat ==
Ca. N. gargensis was discovered in a Garga hot spring and most commonly resides in similar heavy metal-containing thermal springs or can be isolated from microbial mats near hot springs. Besides hot springs, other ammonia-oxidizing archaea are commonly found in soil, freshwater, and the sediments in freshwater. Ca. N. gargensis grows best at 46°C and thrives on the presence of ammonia or other nitrogen sources, and it utilizes flagella to move via chemotaxis.

== Current research ==
=== Crenarchaeol isomer ===
The membrane composition of ammonia-oxidizing archaea, specifically through a crenarchaeol isomer, can be used to identify them as an AOA. Ca. N. gargensis was the first cultivated organism with the ability to produce a significant quantity of the crenarchaeol isomer. With its ability to synthesize crenarchaeol, Ca. N. gargensis allows scientists to expand this synthesis also to the Group I.1b Crenarchaeota. These discoveries indicate that these organisms are significant sources of crenarchaeol in their habitats of thermophilic and terrestrial environments and corroborate the association between AOA and crenarchaeol.

=== Marine nitrogen cycles ===
Furthermore, Ca. N. gargensis influence as an ammonia-oxidizing archaea expands from land to water since its nitrification ability plays a role in the nitrogen cycles that are present in the ocean. The nitrogen cycle determines the interplay of organisms in marine ecosystems and the activity of the ocean.

=== Food production and fertilizers ===
Along with influencing the structure of soils and ocean communities, Ca. N. gargensis also plays a role in food production. Since nitrogen is required for food production, fertilizers containing nitrogen are used. This leads to pollution that can harm the environment and end up in wastewater. Therefore, researchers are trying to develop ways to remove the nitrogen from the affected areas. Organisms similar to Ca. N. gargensis were found to oxidize ammonia in this study, and with this knowledge, the researchers plan on coupling this ability with other processes in the nitrogen cycle in order to remove the form of nitrogen that is polluting the area. Such couplings could occur due to the fact that AOA are not affected by nitrous acid concentrations whereas nitrite-oxidizing bacteria are inhibited by this chemical. In this difference, techniques could be developed to foster deammonification, which is more cost-effective. Overall, in these studies, researchers are trying to find the correct balance in a thermophilic bioreactor in order to eliminate nitrogen.
