= Nitrososphaera =

Scientific classification
- Domain: Archaea
- Kingdom: Thermoproteati
- Phylum: Thermoproteota
- Class: Nitrososphaeria
- Order: Nitrososphaerales; Stieglmeier et al. 2014
- Family: Nitrososphaeraceae; Stieglmeier et al. 2014
- Genus: Nitrososphaera; Stieglmeier et al. 2014

Type species
- Nitrososphaera viennensis Stieglmeier et al. 2014

Species
- "Ca. N. evergladensis"; "Ca. N. gargensis"; "Ca. N. maunauluensis"; N. viennensis

Synonyms
- "Candidatus Nitrososphaera" Hatzenpichler et al. 2008

Genus of archaea

Nitrososphaera is a mesophilic genus of ammonia-oxidizing Crenarchaeota. The first Nitrososphaera organism was discovered in garden soils at the University of Vienna leading to the categorization of a new genus, family, order and class of Archaea. This genus contains three distinct species: N. viennensis, Ca. N. gargensis, and Ca. N. evergladensis. Nitrososphaera are chemolithoautotrophs and have important biogeochemical roles as nitrifying organisms.

== Phylogeny ==
The Nitrososphaera genus contains one of the first discovered ammonia-oxidizing archaea (N. viennensis). Only three distinct species of this genus have been identified. Both Ca. N. gargensis, and Ca. N. Evergladensis are known as Candidatus, which have been discovered and analyzed but have yet been studied in pure culture in a lab. The currently accepted taxonomy is based on the List of Prokaryotic names with Standing in Nomenclature (LPSN) and National Center for Biotechnology Information (NCBI).

16S rRNA based LTP_07_2026

- Nitrososphaera
  N. viennensis

53 marker proteins based GTDB 11-RS232

- Nitrososphaera
  - "Ca. N. gargensis" Hatzenpichler et al. 2008
  - - "Ca. N. evergladensis" Zhainina et al. 2014
    - N. viennensis Stieglmeier et al. 2014

=== Genome structure ===
The 16S rRNA gene of all Nitrososphaera. are nearly identical as they are neighboring within the phylogentic tree. N. viennensis has a 3% divergence from Ca. N. gargensis, while Ca. N evergladensis has a 97% similarity to Ca. N. gargensis within the 16S rRNA gene. The Nitrososphaera. use ammonia monooxygenase (amoA) genes to oxidize ammonium to nitrite.

== Morphology ==
All three species contain genes for urease, urea, and ammonia. Nitrososphaera have a cell membrane composed of crenarchaeol, its isomer, and a glycerol dialkyl glycerol tetraether (GDGT), all of which are used for identifying ammonia-oxidizing archaea. N. viennensis has a cell diameter of 0.6–0.9 μm and is an irregular spherical coccus. Ca. N. gargensis is non-pathogenic presents a diameter of approximately 0.9 ± 0.3 μm with a relatively small coccus. Ca. N evergladensis has yet to be properly analyzed and described for morphological characteristics.

== Habitats ==
Ammonia-oxidizing archaea have been found in various environments and habitats around the world. N. viennensis was first discovered in garden soils. The preferred growth conditions are 35 °C - 42 °C and pH of 7.5. Ca. N. gargensis was found in hot springs and is commonly found in heavy metal containing habitats with a growth temperature of ~ 46 °C. Ca. N evergladensis was first discovered in the humid region of the Everglades in Florida. Other relatives of Nitrososphaera. have also been detected in swamps, microbial mats, freshwater sediments, deep sea marine sediments, and regions with high levels of nitrogen and ammonia sources to allow for the oxidation process of the lipids and nutrients for the optimal survival of these microbes.

== Nitrification and environmental impact ==
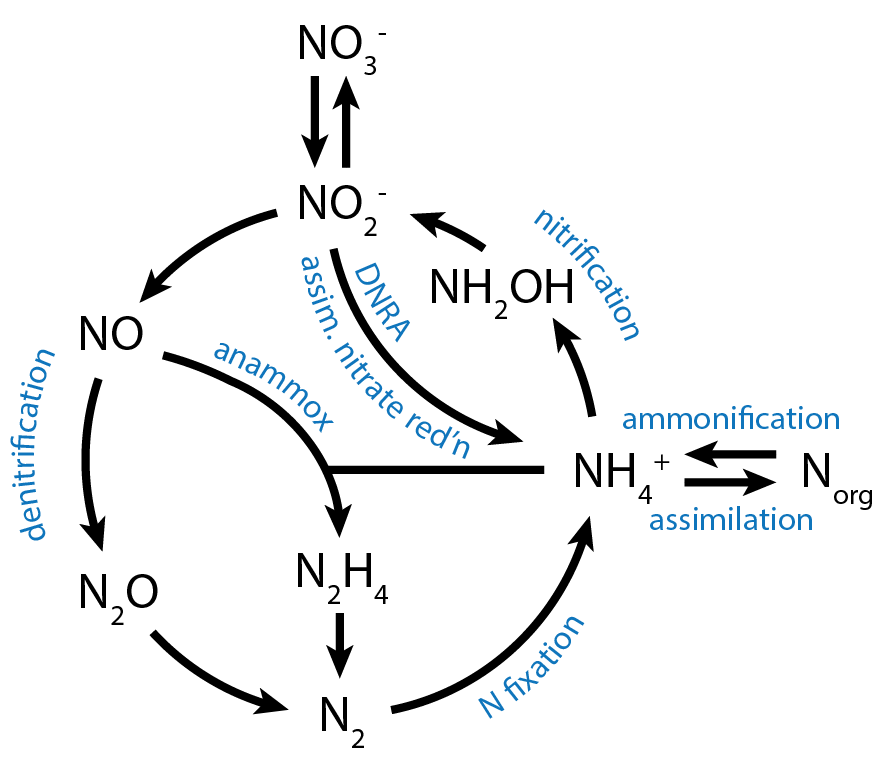
Microbial nitrogen cycle. Process by which ammonia is processed through microbial organisms for lipid and protein production.

The discovery of Nitrososphaera capable of ammonia oxidation indicated that both archaea and bacteria were capable of ammonia oxidation. Ammonia-oxidizing archaea have been comparable to ammonia-oxidizing bacteria. It was not until recent discovery and analysis, scientists believed that only ammonia-oxidizing bacteria were capable of oxidizing ammonia within the soils. However, ammonia-oxidizing archaea and ammonia-oxidizing bacteria work together in the nitrogen cycle. Ammonia-oxidizing archaea, including Nitrososphaera, are abundant in warm and humid soils, along with ammonia-oxidizing bacteria. Both microbes play a significant role in the nitrification of soils.

Nitrososphaera utilize ammonia from the environment to generate ATP by oxidizing ammonia (NH_{3}) into nitrite (NO_{2}^{−}). Ammonia oxidation leads to the disaggregation of other chemical compounds, providing important nutrients for plant survival. One of the chemical compounds that forms from nitrogen cycling is nitrous oxide (N_{2}O), a greenhouse gas. Nitrous oxide has a 216 times higher radiative efficiency than CO_{2}. These ammonia-oxidizing archaea are a key component in soils, which emit more than 65% of the Earth's atmospheric nitrous oxide concentrations.

== See also ==
- List of Archaea genera
