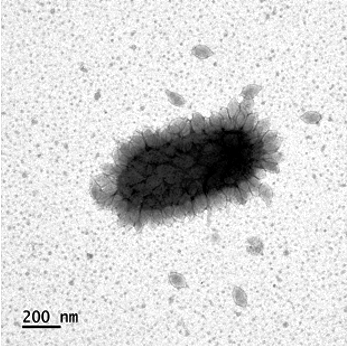
- Nitrosopumilus maritimus, partially with virions of Nitrosopumilus spindle-shaped virus 1 (Thaspiviridae) attached.

Scientific classification
- Domain: Archaea
- Kingdom: Thermoproteati
- Phylum: Thermoproteota
- Class: Nitrososphaeria
- Order: Nitrosopumilales
- Family: Nitrosopumilaceae; Qin et al. 2017

Genera
- See text

Synonyms
- "Cenarchaeaceae" DeLong & Preston 1996; "Nitrosopumilaceae" Konneke et al. 2005; Nitrosotaleaceae Lehtovirta-Morley et al. 2024; "Nitrosotenuaceae" Herbold et al. 2016

= Nitrosopumilaceae =

Family of archaea

The Nitrosopumilaceae are a family of the Archaea order Nitrosopumilales.

== Taxonomy ==
16S rRNA based LTP_07_2026

- - Nitrosotaleales
    - Nitrosotaleaceae
      Nitrosotalea
  - Nitrosopumilales
    - Nitrosopumilaceae
      - Nitrosarchaeum
      - Nitrosopumilus

53 marker proteins based GTDB 11-RS232

- Nitrosopumilaceae
  - Nitrosotalea Lehtovirta-Morley et al. 2024
  - - "Ca. Nitrosotenuis" Lebedeva et al. 2013
    - - "Ca. Nitrosopelagicus" Santoro et al. 2015
      - - "Ca. Nitrosoabyssus" Garritano et al. 2024
        - - "Ca. Cenarchaeum" DeLong & Preston 1996
          - - Nitrosarchaeum Jung et al. 2018
            - - "Ca. Nitrosomaritimum" Zhao et al. 2024
              - Nitrosopumilus Qin et al. 2017

Unassigned Nitrosopumilaceae:

- "Ca. Nitrosokoinonia" Glasl et al. 2023
- "Ca. Nitrosospongia" Moeller et al. 2019

== See also ==
- List of Archaea genera
