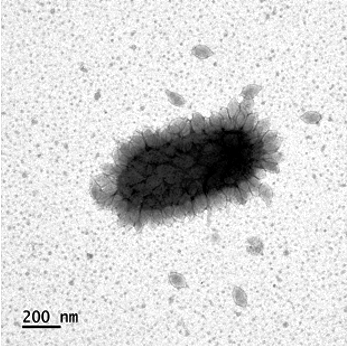
- Nitrosopumilus maritimus, partially with virions of Nitrosopumilus spindle-shaped virus 1 (Thaspiviridae) attached.

Scientific classification
- Domain: Archaea
- Kingdom: Thermoproteati
- Phylum: Thermoproteota
- Class: Nitrososphaeria
- Order: Nitrosopumilales; Qin et al. 2017

Families
- Nitrosopumilaceae; "Nitrosotenuaceae"

Synonyms
- Cenarchaeales Cavalier-Smith 2002

= Nitrosopumilales =

Order of archaea

The Nitrosopumilales are an order of the Archaea class Nitrososphaeria.

== Phylogeny ==
16S rRNA based LTP_07_2026

- - Nitrosotaleales
    - Nitrosotaleaceae
      Nitrosotalea
  - Nitrosopumilales
    - Nitrosopumilaceae
      - Nitrosarchaeum
      - Nitrosopumilus

53 marker proteins based GTDB 11-RS232

- Nitrosopumilaceae
  - Nitrosotalea
  - - "Ca. Nitrosotenuis"
    - - "Ca. Nitrosopelagicus"
      - - "Ca. Nitrosoabyssus"
        - - "Ca. Cenarchaeum"
          - - Nitrosarchaeum
            - - "Ca. Nitrosomaritimum"
              - Nitrosopumilus

== Taxonomy ==
The currently accepted taxonomy is based on the List of Prokaryotic names with Standing in Nomenclature (LPSN) and National Center for Biotechnology Information (NCBI)

- Order Nitrosotaleales Lehtovirta-Morley et al. 2024
  - Family Nitrosotaleaceae Lehtovirta-Morley et al. 2024
    - Nitrosotalea Lehtovirta-Morley et al. 2024
- Order Nitrosopumilales Qin et al. 2017
  - Family "Nitrosotenuaceae" Herbold et al. 2016
    - "Candidatus Nitrosotenuis" Li et al. 2016
  - Family Nitrosopumilaceae Qin et al. 2017
    - "Ca. Cenarchaeum" DeLong & Preston 1996
    - Nitrosarchaeum corrig. Jung et al. 2018
    - "Candidatus Nitrosoabyssus" Garritano et al. 2024
    - ?"Candidatus Nitrosokoinonia" Glasl et al. 2023
    - "Candidatus Nitrosomaritimum" Zhao et al. 2024
    - "Candidatus Nitrosopelagicus" Santoro et al. 2015
    - Nitrosopumilus Qin et al. 2017
    - ?"Candidatus Nitrosospongia" Moeller et al. 2019
