= Hydroxyarchaeol =

hydroxyarchaeol
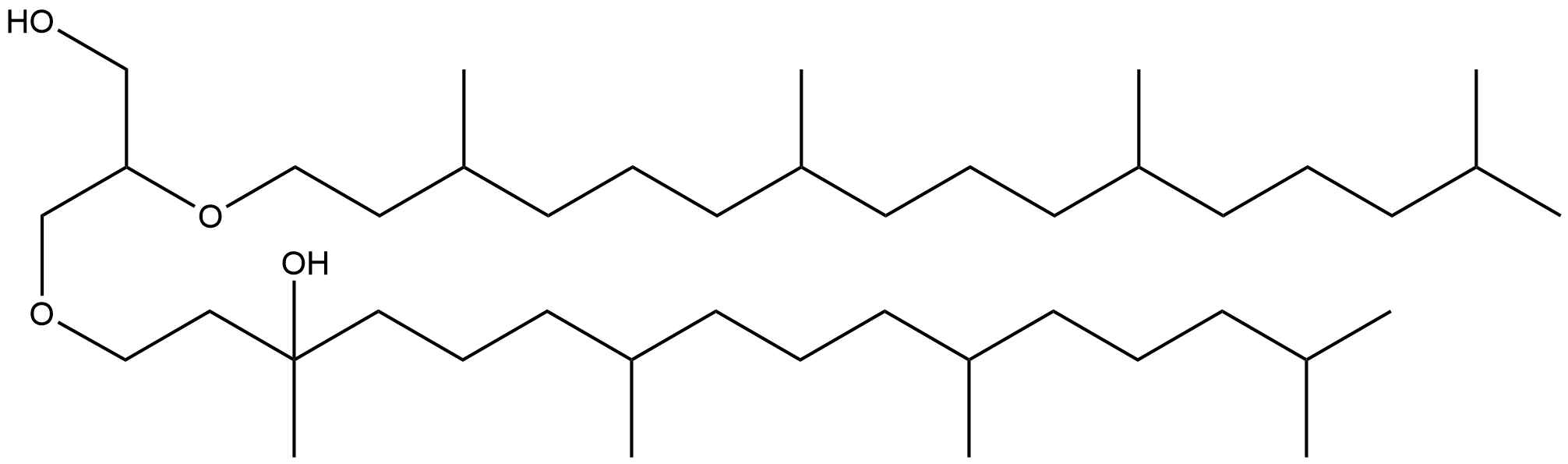

Names
- IUPAC name 1-(3-hydroxy-2-((3,7,11,15-tetramethylhexadecyl)oxy)propoxy)-3-7-11-15-tetramethylhexadecan-3-ol
- Other names hydroxyarchaeol lipid|3'-hydroxydiether lipid|2-O-(3,7,11,15-tetramethyl)hexadecyl-3-O-(3'-hydroxy-3',7',11',15'-tetramethyl)hexadecyl-sn-glycerol

Identifiers
CAS Number	134108-15-9
3D model (JSmol)	Interactive image
PubChem CID	76128146
CompTox Dashboard (EPA)	DTXSID601336846
- InChI: InChI=1S/C43H88O4/c1-35(2)17-11-19-37(5)21-13-23-39(7)24-15-26-41(9)28-31-47-42(33-44)34-46-32-30-43(10,45)29-16-27-40(8)25-14-22-38(6)20-12-18-36(3)4/h35-42,44-45H,11-34H2,1-10H3 Key: WZRFZYVQKWIZEV-UHFFFAOYSA-N
- SMILES: CC(C)CCCC(C)CCCC(C)CCCC(C)CCOC(CO)COCCC(C)(CCCC(C)CCCC(C)CCCC(C)C)O

Properties
Chemical formula	C_{43}H_{88}O_{4}
Molar mass	699.17 g·mol^{−1}
- Except where otherwise noted, data are given for materials in their standard state (at 25 °C [77 °F], 100 kPa). Infobox references

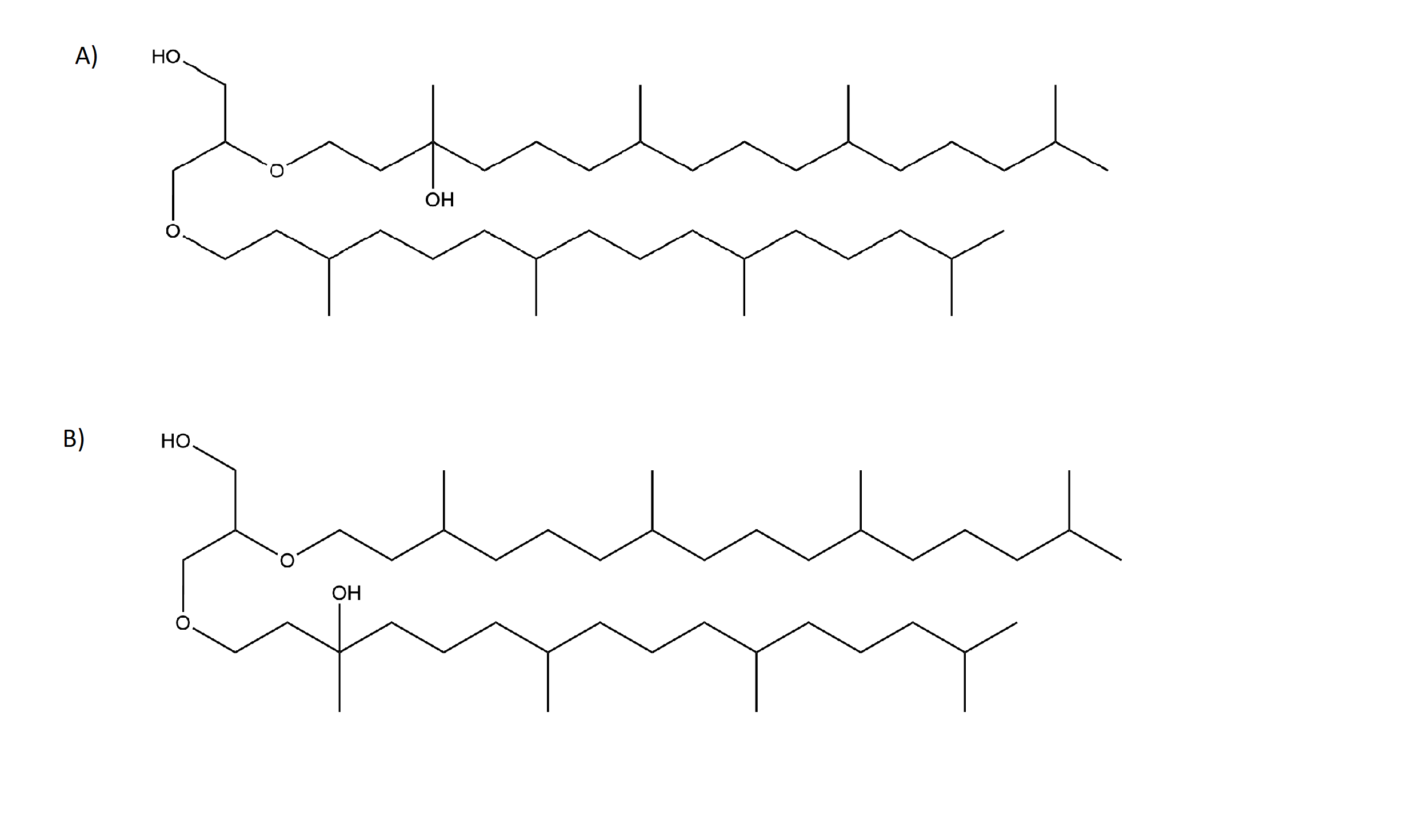
Chemical structure of the two major isomers of hydroxyarchaeol. A) sn-2 hydroxyarchaeol, B) sn-3 hydroxyarchaeol.

Hydroxyarchaeol is a core lipid unique to archaea, similar to archaeol, with a hydroxide functional group at the carbon-3 position of one of its ether side chains. It is found exclusively in certain taxa of methanogenic archaea, and is a common biomarker for methanogenesis and methane-oxidation. Isotopic analysis of hydroxyarchaeol can be informative about the environment and substrates for methanogenesis.

== Discovery ==
Hydroxyarchaeol was first identified by Dennis G. Sprott and colleagues in 1990 from Methanosaeta concilii by a combination of TLC, NMR and mass spectrometric analysis.

== Structure and function ==
The lipid consists of a glycerol backbone with two C_{20} phytanyl ether chains attached, one of which has a hydroxyl (-OH) group attached at the C3 carbon. It is one of the major core lipids of methanogenic archaea alongside archaeol, forming the basis of their cell membrane. The two major forms are sn-2- and sn-3-hydroxyarchaeol, depending on if the hydroxyl group is on the sn-2 or sn-3 phytanyl chain of the glycerol backbone.

== Methanogen biomarker ==
Use of hydroxyarchaeol as a biomarker was a primary way to identify methanogens in the environment, though it has become supplementary to metagenomic and 16S rRNA techniques for identifying phylogeny. While hydroxyarchaeol has only been identified in methanogenic archaea, not all methanogens count it among their core lipids. Other methanogens may contain different derivatives of archaeol, including cyclic archaeol and caldarchaeol based on taxonomic differences. Hydroxyarchaeol has been identified in many different taxa, including within the orders Methanococcales, Methanosarcinales, which contains the genus Methanosaeta, and a genus from the order Methanobacteriales. There is evidence that there is a taxonomic preference for the sn-2 vs sn-3 form based on phylogeny, as a mix of the two forms do not tend to appear in the same organism, but the reason for this difference is not well understood. Because of the hydroxyl group, which is prone to degradation over time, hydroxyarchaeol has not been observed in ancient samples, and thus is thought to indicate modern sources of methanogens .

== Measurement techniques ==
Original measurements of hydroxyarchaeol were done using TLC and NMR, but have become dominated by gas-chromatograph/mass spectrometry. For most methods, extraction of the core lipid is typically done using variations of a Bligh-Dyer method, which makes use of the various polarities and miscibility of dichloromethane (DCM), methanol, and water. Acidic conditions using trichloroacetic acid (TCA) during extraction and additional cleanup of samples with polar solvents such as DCM is often needed to better isolate the lipids of interest.

=== GC-MS ===
Prior to GC-MS analysis, the intact hydroxyarchaeol lipid is typically hydrolyzed to the core lipid component and derivatized by adding trimethyl silyl (TMS) groups to the free hydroxyl functional groups. This allows for the lipid to volatilize in the GC and reach the MS analyzer. Because hydroxyarchaeol has multiple sites that can be modified after TMS derivatization, the observed mass spectra can be either the mono- or di-TMS derivative, and need to be compared to authentic standards to properly identify and quantify. For identification and quantification, the mass spectrometer typically utilizes a quadrupole mass analyzer, but isotopic analysis uses an isotope-ratio mass spectrometer (IRMS) that has higher mass resolution and sensitivity.

=== δ^{13}C Isotope ratio analysis ===
The relative isotopic ratio of carbon (δ^{13}C) found in hydroxyarchaeol is used to identify what the methane-associated organism is using as a carbon source. Carbon sources in the environment will have a measurable δ^{13}C signature that can be matched with the biomarkers found in an organism, which will gain the isotopic signature of its food source. Since archaea that make hydroxyarchaeol can harness a number of carbon sources, including dissolved inorganic carbon (DIC), methanol, trimethylamine, and methane, this is a useful way to determine which is the primary source of energy, or if there is a mixture of use in the environment.

== Case Study ==
Methane-oxidizing archaea in association with sulfate reducing bacteria (ANME-SRB) found at methane-seeps. Red = ANME, green = SRB.

Hydroxyarchaeol has been found in peat bogs and methane seeps in the deep ocean as a marker of both methanogens and methanotrophs. The deep sea sediment hydroxyarchaeol had very depleted δ^{13}C at methane seeps. Both the methane and DIC present also had depleted δ^{13}C values, but not as a perfect match to the identified biomarker. By modeling the isotopic ratio of DIC and methane to the isotopic ratio of the biomarkers, the researchers could estimate the relative contribution to biosynthesis and metabolic pathways that each source had for the organism. The model could predict a relative contribution that matched well with actual measurements, indicating there was mixed metabolism occurring at these sites, with specific biosynthetic pathways using different proportions of carbon derived from each source. This method made use of hydroxyarchaeol in the bulk sample to target the metabolism of a specific group of microbes without need for exhaustive separations of different organisms, making it useful for environmental analysis.
