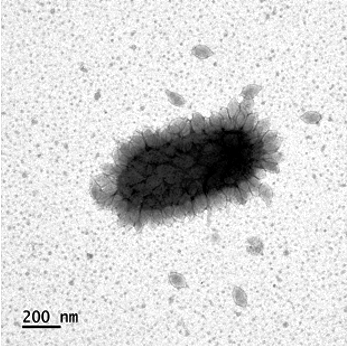
- Nitrosopumilus maritimus, partially with virions of Nitrosopumilus spindle-shaped virus 1 (Thaspiviridae) attached.

Scientific classification
- Domain: Archaea
- Kingdom: Thermoproteati
- Phylum: Thermoproteota
- Class: Nitrososphaeria
- Order: Nitrosopumilales
- Family: Nitrosopumilaceae
- Genus: Nitrosopumilus; Qin et al. 2017

Type species
- Nitrosopumilus maritimus Qin et al. 2017

Species
- See text

Synonyms
- "Ca. Nitrosopumilus" Konneke et al. 2005; "Ca. Nitrosomarinus" Ahlgren et al. 2017

= Nitrosopumilus =

Genus of archaea

Nitrosopumilus is a genus of archaea. The type species, Nitrosopumilus maritimus, is an extremely common archaeon living in seawater. It is the first member of the Group 1a Nitrososphaerota (formerly Thaumarchaeota) to be isolated in pure culture. Gene sequences suggest that the Group 1a Nitrososphaerota are ubiquitous with the oligotrophic surface ocean and can be found in most non-coastal marine waters around the planet. It is one of the smallest living organisms at 0.2 micrometers in diameter. Cells in the species N. maritimus are shaped like peanuts and can be found both as individuals and in loose aggregates. They oxidize ammonia to nitrite and members of N. maritimus can oxidize ammonia at levels as low as 10 nanomolar, near the limit to sustain its life. Archaea in the species N. maritimus live in oxygen-depleted habitats. Oxygen needed for ammonia oxidation might be produced by novel pathway which generates oxygen and dinitrogen. N. maritimus is thus among other organisms which are able to produce oxygen in the dark.

This organism was isolated from sediment in a tropical tank at the Seattle Aquarium by a group led by David Stahl (University of Washington).

== Biology ==
=== Lipid membranes ===
Populations of N. maritimus are probably the main source of glycerol dialkyl glycerol tetraethers (GDGTs) in the ocean, a compound which constitutes their monolayer lipidic cell membranes as intact polar lipids (IPLs) together with crenarcheol. This membrane structure is thought to maximise proton motive force. The compounds found in the membrane of these organisms, such as GDGTs, IPLs, and crenarcheol, can be useful as biomarkers for the presence of organisms belonging to the Nitrososphaerota group in the water column. These archaea have also been found to change their membrane's composition in relation to temperature (by GDGT cyclization), growth, metabolic status, and, even if less dramatically, to pH.

=== Cell division ===
All known Archaea use cell division to duplicate. Euryarchaeota and Bacteria use the FtsZ mechanism in cell division, while Thermoproteota divide using the Cdv machinery. However, Nitrososphaerota such as N. maritimus adopts both mechanisms, FtsZ and Cdv. Nevertheless, after further researches, N. maritimus was found to use mainly Cdv proteins rather than FtsZ during cell division. In this case, Cdv is the primary system in cell division for N. maritimus. Therefore, to replicate a genome of 1.645Mb, N. maritimus spends 15 to 18 hours.

== Physiology ==
=== Genome ===
Ammonia-oxidizing bacteria (AOB) are known to have chemolithoautotrophic growth by using inorganic carbon, N. maritimus, an Ammonia-oxidizing archaea (AOA) use a similar process of growth. While AOB uses Calvin–Bassham–Benson cycle with the CO_{2}-fixing enzyme ribulose bisphosphate carboxylase/oxygenase (RubisCO) as the key enzyme; N. maritimus seems to grow and use an alternative pathway due to the lack of genes and enzymes. Therefore, a variant of the 3-hydroxypropionate/4-hydroxybutyrate is used by N. maritimus to develop autotrophically, which allows its capacity to assimilate inorganic carbon. Using the 3-hydroxypropionate/4-hydroxybutyrate pathway method instead of the Calvin cycle, N. maritimus could provide a growth advantage as the process is more energy-efficient. Due to its originality, N. maritimus plays an essential role in the carbon and nitrogen cycle

=== Ammonia oxidation ===
The isolation and the sequencing of N. maritimuss genome have allowed to extend the insight into the physiology of the organisms belonging to the Nitrososphaerota group. N. maritimus was the first Archaeon with an ammonia oxidizing metabolism to be studied. This organism is common in the marine environment especially at the bottom of the photic zone where the amount of Ammonium and Iron is enough to support its growth. The physiology of N. maritimus remains unclear under certain aspects. It conserves energy for its vital functions, from the oxidation of Ammonia (NH_{3}) and the reduction of Oxygen (O_{2}), with the formation of Nitrite. CO_{2} is the carbon source. It is fixed and assimilated by the microorganism through the 3-hydroxypropinate/4-hydroxybutyrate carbon cycle.

N. maritimus carries out the first step of Nitrification, by acting in a key role in the Nitrogen cycle along the water column. Since this oxidizing reaction releases just a little amount of energy, the growth of this microorganism is slow. N. maritimus’s genome includes the amoA gene, encoding for the Ammonia Monooxygenase (AMO) enzyme. This latter allows the oxidation of ammonia to hydroxylamine (NH_{2}OH). Instead, the genome lacks the gene encoding for Hydroxylamine Oxidoreductase (HAO) responsible for oxidizing the intermediate (NH_{2}OH) to nitrite. The hydroxylamine is produced as a metabolite, and it is immediately consumed during the metabolic reaction. Other intermediates produced during this metabolic pathway are: the nitric oxide (NO), the nitrous oxide (N_{2}O), the nitoxyl (HNO). These are toxic at high concentration. The enzyme responsible for oxidizing the hydroxylamine to nitrite is not well-known yet.

Two hypotheses are suggested for the metabolic pathway of N. maritimus that involve two types of enzymes : the copper-based enzyme (Cu-ME) and the nitrite reductase enzyme (nirK) and its reverse:

- In the first one ammonia is oxidized through AMO forming the hydroxylamine; the latter, plus a molecule of nitric oxide, are, in turn, oxidized by a copper-based enzyme (Cu-ME) producing two molecules of nitrite. One of these is reduced to NO by the nitrite reductase (nirK) and goes back to the cu-ME enzyme. An electrons translocation occurs producing a Proton Motive Force (PMF) and allowing ATP synthesis.
- In the second one ammonia is oxidized through AMO making up the hydroxylamine and then the two enzymes, nirK and Cu-ME, oxidize the hydroxylamine to nitric oxide and this to nitrite. The proper roles and the order at which these enzymes work, have to be clarified.

The S-layer of N. maritimus is found to form into multiple layers of channels that allow ammonium (NH^{+}_{4}) cations to flow through.

Additionally, nitrous oxide is released by this type of metabolism. It is an important greenhouse gas that likely is produced as result of abiotic denitrification of metabolites.

== Taxonomy ==
The currently accepted taxonomy is based on the List of Prokaryotic names with Standing in Nomenclature (LPSN) and National Center for Biotechnology Information (NCBI).

16S rRNA based LTP_07_2026

- Nitrosopumilus
  - - "N. ureiphilus"
    - - N. adriaticus
      - N. zosterae
  - - - N. maritimus
      - N. piranensis
    - - "N. cobalaminigenes"
      - "N. oxyclinae"

53 marker proteins based GTDB 11-RS232

- Nitrosopumilus
  - - "Ca. N. brisbanensis" Prabhu et al. 2024
    - - N. piranensis Bayer et al. 2019
      - - "Ca. N. koreensis" Park et al. 2012
        - N. maritimus Qin et al. 2017
  - - - N. adriaticus Bayer et al. 2019
      - - "N. ureiphilus" Qin et al. 2017
        - N. zosterae Nakagawa et al. 2021
    - - "Ca. N. salarius" corrig. Mosier et al. 2012
      - - - "Ca. N. catalinensis" (Ahlgren et al. 2017) Rinke et al. 2020
          - "Ca. N. limneticus" Klotz et al. 2022
        - - "N. oxyclinae" Qin et al. 2017
          - - "N. cobalaminigenes" Qin et al. 2017
            - "Ca. N. sediminis" Park et al. 2012

Nitrosopumilus incertae sedis:

- "Ca. N. bathypathes" Wei et al. 2025
- "N. cymbastelae" corrig. Zhang et al. 2019
- "N. detritiferus" Zhang et al. 2019
- "N. hexadellae" corrig. Zhang et al. 2019

== Ecology ==
=== Habitats ===
Characteristic of the Nitrososphaerota phylum, N. maritimus is mainly found in oligotrophic (poor environment in nutrients) open ocean, within the Pelagic zone. Initially discovered in Seattle, in an aquarium, today N. maritimus can populate numerous environment such as the subtropical North Pacific and South Atlantic Ocean or the mesopelagic zone in the Pacific Ocean. N. maritimus is an aerobic archeon able to grow even with an extremely low concentration of nutrients, like in dark-deep open ocean, in which N. maritimus as an important impact.

=== Contributions ===
==== Nitrification of the ocean ====
Members of the species N. maritimus can oxidize ammonia to form nitrite, which is the first step of the nitrogen cycle. Ammonia and nitrate are the two nutrients which form the inorganic pool of nitrogen. Populating poor environments (lacking of organic energy sources and sunlight), the oxidation of ammonia could contribute to primary productivity . In fact, nitrate fuels half of the primary production of phytoplankton but not only phytoplankton needs nitrate. The high ammonia's affinity allows N. maritimus to largely compete with the other marine phototrophs and chemotrophs. Regarding the ammonium turnover per unit biomass, N. maritimus would be around 5 times higher than oligotrophic heterotrophs' turnover, and around 30 times higher than most of the oligotrophic diatoms known turnover. Computing these two observations nitrification by N. maritimus plays a key role in the marine nitrogen cycle.

==== Carbon and phosphorus implications ====
Its ability to fix inorganic carbon via an alternative pathway (3-hydroxypropionate/4-hydroxybutyrate pathway) allows N. maritimus to participate efficiently in the flux of the global carbon budget. Coupling with the ammonia-oxidizing pathway, N. maritimus and the other marine thaumarchaea, approximately, recycle 4.5% of the organic carbon mineralized in the oceans and transform 4.3% of detrital phosphorus into new phosphorus substances.

== See also ==
- List of Archaea genera
