= Crenarchaeol =

Names
- IUPAC name [(9S,12S,16S,24S,28R,31R,35S,43S,46S,50S,58S,62R,65R)-12-(Hydroxymethyl)-9,16,24,28,31,35,43,50,58,62,65-undecamethyl-11,14,45,48-tetraoxahexacyclo[63.3.1.1^{2,5}.1^{20,23}.1^{36,39}.154,57]triheptacontan-46-yl]methanol

Identifiers
CAS Number	487010-21-9
3D model (JSmol)	Interactive image
ChemSpider	24822160
PubChem CID	42607380
- InChI: InChI=1S/C82H154O6/c1-61-20-12-27-68(8)75-41-37-71(48-75)30-15-23-64(4)56-86-60- 81(54-84)88-58-67(7)26-18-33-74-40-44-78(51-74)79-34-19-46-82(11,52-79)47-45-63( 3)22-14-29-70(10)77-42-38-72(49-77)31-16-24-65(5)55-85-59-80(53-83)87-57-66(6)25 -17-32-73-39-43-76(50-73)69(9)28-13-21-62(2)36-35-61/h61-81,83-84H,12-60H2,1-11H 3/t61-,62-,63-,64+,65+,66+,67+,68+,69+,70+,71?,72?,73?,74?,75?,76?,77?,78?,79?,8 0+,81+,82-/m1/s1 Key: VLTNDASRNRVJQP-VFMBZWNMSA-N
- SMILES: C[C@@H]1CCC[C@@H](C2CCC(C2)CCC[C@@H](COC[C@@H](OC[C@H](CCCC3CCC(C3)C4CCC[C@@](C4)(CC[C@@H](CCC[C@@H](C5CCC(C5)CCC[C@@H](COC[C@@H](OC[C@H](CCCC6CCC(C6)[C@H](CCC[C@H](CC1)C)C)C)CO)C)C)C)C)C)CO)C)C

Properties
Chemical formula	C_{82}H_{154}O_{6}
Molar mass	1236.128 g·mol^{−1}
- Except where otherwise noted, data are given for materials in their standard state (at 25 °C [77 °F], 100 kPa). Infobox references

Crenarchaeol is a glycerol biphytanes glycerol tetraether (GDGT) biological membrane lipid. Together with archaeol, crenarcheol comprises a major component of archaeal membranes. Archaeal membranes are distinct from those of bacteria and eukaryotes because they contain isoprenoid GDGTs instead of diacyl lipids, which are found in the other domains (Bacteria, Eukarya). It has been proposed that GDGT membrane lipids are an adaptation to the high temperatures present in the environments that are home to extremophile archaea

== Discovery and distribution ==
Archaeal GDGTs were first detected in pelagic waters. Unknown GDGTs were also found in marine sediments and isolated from Cenarchaeum symbiosum, a marine ammonia-oxidizing archaeon that lives in symbiosis with sponges.

Following the discovery of GDGTs outside of hydrothermal environments, crenarchaeol was first identified as the major GDGT component in surface sediments and extracts from C. symbiosum by two-dimensional nuclear magnetic resonance (2D-NMR) spectroscopy. It was named for the phylum Crenarchaeota (now Thermoproteota), to which the ammonia-oxidizing pelagic archaea that produce crenarchaeol were thought to belong before it was proposed that the Marine Group I Crenarchaeota be considered a distinct phylum, Thaumarchaeota (now Nitrososphaerota).

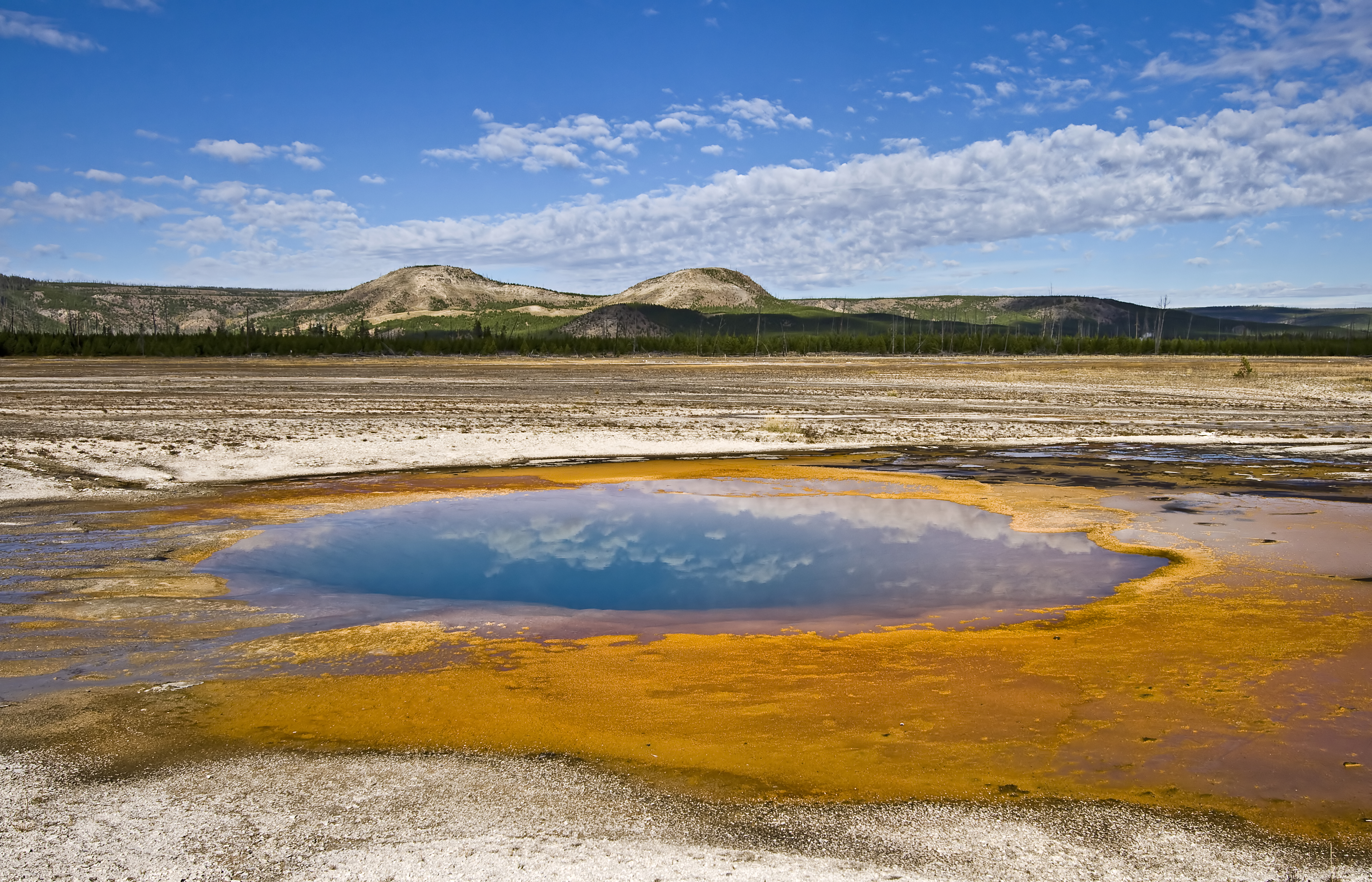
Crenarchaeol was originally thought to be produced only in pelagic ocean environments, but researchers have since discovered that it is also produced by archaea living in high temperature environments including hot springs like this one.

=== Occurrence in ammonia oxidizing organisms ===
Crenarchaeol has been proposed as a biomarker for pelagic ammonia-oxidizing archaea (AOA). Crenarchaeol is produced by AOA belonging to the phylum Nitrososphaerota (formerly classified as the Marine Group 1 Crenarchaeota). It has been confirmed to be produced by pure cultures of the pelagic mesothermic C. symbiosum and Nitrosopumilus maritimus, as well as the moderately thermophilic Nitrososphaera gargensis and the hyperthermophilic Candidatus Nitrosocaldus yellowstonii. The discovery that crenarchaeol in Ca. N. yellowstonii and N. gargensis disproved the previous consensus that crenarchaeol was specific to mesothermic Nitrososphaerota and suggests that it is found more broadly within the phylum.

== In biology ==
=== Chemistry and function ===
Structurally, the molecule consists of two long hydrocarbon chains that extend through the cell membrane and are bound on each to glycerol through ether linkage.

Like other GDGTs, crenarchaeol is a membrane lipid with distinct hydrophobic and hydrophilic regions. The long, nonpolar hydrocarbon chains are hydrophobic while the ether-linked glycerol head groups are polar and hydrophilic. In most organisms, the cell membrane consists of a lipid bilayer in which phospholipids arrange with their hydrophobic, nonpolar hydrocarbon tails facing inwards towards one another and their hydrophilic, polar head groups facing outwards to associate with the polar environments of the cytoplasm or cell exterior. This organization is promoted by the hydrophobic effect, which makes it energetically favorable for hydrophobic molecules to isolate themselves away from aqueous environments. Because GDGTs have two hydrophilic head groups, they form a lipid monolayer in the cell membrane instead of a bilayer, making GDGT-producing archaea exceptional among all clades of life. Originally, it was believed that GDGT membrane lipids were an adaption to life at high temperatures and acidities. Because the two sides of a monolayer lipid are connected by covalent bonds rather than the weaker intermolecular forces that promote the cohesion of bilayers, they are more stable than typical bilayers. This hypothesis is supported by the observation that some extremophile bacteria synthesize their own membrane-spanning, ether-bound GDGT analogues. The cyclic moieties of GDGTs may also be an adaption to hyperthermal conditions, and the number of rings in a GDGT's long hydrocarbon chains is temperature-dependent. Crenarchaeol has two cyclopentyl moieties on one of its hydrocarbon chains and one cyclohexyl and two cyclopentyl moieties on the other.

However, the discovery that crenarchaeol and other GDGTs are produced by organisms living in mesothermal environments has thrown the hyperthermal-adaptation hypothesis into question. It has been proposed that the distinctive cyclohexyl group of crenarchaeol is an adaption to pelagic life, as it produces a "kink" in one of crenarchaeol's hydrocarbon chains that prevents the membrane lipids from packing tightly, as would be favorable under high temperatures but unfavorable under temperate ones.

=== Preservation and degradation in sediments ===
Crenarchaeol are stable for hundreds of millions of years in the environment. It is part of the TEX_{86} paleothermometer, a temperature proxy for sea surface temperatures that has been used to reconstruct paleoclimate through to the middle Jurassic (~160 Ma).

Crenarchaeol and other GDGTs can be preserved in the environment for hundreds of millions of years under the right conditions. Most GDGTs degrade at between 240 and 300 °C and so are not found in rocks that have undergone heating to temperatures higher than 300 °C. GDGTs undergo degradation when exposed to oxygen but the relative concentrations of sediment GDGTs tends to remain the same even during degradation, meaning that degradation does not interfere with proxies like TEX_{86} that are based on the ratios of different GDGTs.

=== TEX_{86} paleothermometer ===
The number of rings in GDGT hydrocarbon chains is temperature dependent and provides the basis for the TEX_{86} paleothermometer, a proxy for measuring ancient sea surface temperature (SST) that relies on measurements of the abundances of crenarchaeol and its isomers. Crenarchaeol has a regioisomer which, based on radiocarbon analysis, may have a different origin than other isoprenoid GDGTs. Possible sources for the regioisomer include benthic archaea and diagenesis of crenarchaeol, as the regioisomer is found in low abundance in surface waters and in cultures of pelagic thaumarchaea. Despite this, if it is excluded from TEX_{86} calculations, the paleothermometer's correlation with sea surface temperature becomes less apparent, indicating it is a necessary component of TEX_{86}.

== Isolation and measurement ==
GDGTs such as crenarchaeol can be analyzed using high-performance liquid chromatography/atmospheric pressure chemical ionization-mass spectrometry (HPLC/APCI-MS) following extraction and acid hydrolysis. Acid hydrolysis cleaves the polar head groups from the molecule, leaving the nonpolar chains behind. This is required for chromatography, which is not well suited to analysis of polar molecules. A variety of extraction techniques have been demonstrated to be effective for GDGTs. One common method is extraction by ultrasonication with methanol followed by washes of the nonpolar solvent dichloromethane (DCM). GDGTs have characteristic [M + H]^{+} - 18 and [M + H]^{+} - 74 ions that, for crenarchaeol, have masses of 1218 and 1162 Da, respectively. Relative abundances of GDGTs can be determined by integrating the peak areas of their characteristic ions.
