= TEX86 =

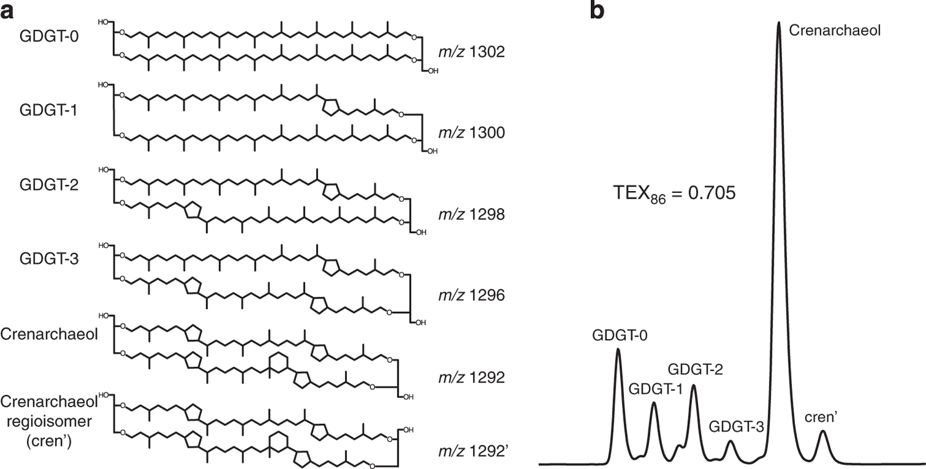
Molecular structures and HPLC detection of GDGTs. Retrieved from Tierney and Tingley (2015).

TEX_{86} is an organic paleothermometer based upon the membrane lipids of mesophilic marine Nitrososphaerota (formerly "Thaumarchaeota", "Marine Group 1 Crenarchaeota").

== Basics ==
The membrane lipids of Nitrososphaerota are composed of glycerol dialkyl glycerol tetraethers (GDGTs) which contain 0-3 cyclopentane moieties (commonly annotated as GDGT-n where n = numbers of cyclopentane moieties). Nitrososphaerota also synthesise crenarchaeol (cren) which contains four cyclopentane moieties and a single cyclohexane moiety and a regio-isomer (cren'). The cyclohexane and cyclopentane rings, formed by internal cyclisation of one of the biphytane chains, have a pronounced effect on the thermal transition points of the Nitrososphaerota cell membrane. Mesocosm studies demonstrate that the degree of cyclisation is generally governed by growth temperature.

== Calibrations ==
Based upon the relative distribution of isoprenoidal GDGTs, Schouten et al. (2002) proposed the tetraether index of 86 carbon atoms (TEX_{86}) as a proxy for sea surface temperature (SST). GDGT-0 is excluded from the calibration as it can have multiple sources while cren is omitted as it exhibits no correlation with SST and is often an order of magnitude more abundant than its isomer and the other GDGTs. The most recent TEX_{86} calibration invokes two separate indices and calibrations: TEX_{86}^{H} uses the same combination of GDGTs as in the original TEX_{86} relationship:

$$\text{GDGT ratio-2}=\tfrac{[\text{GDGT-2}]+[\text{GDGT-3}]+[\text{cren}']}{[\text{GDGT-1}]+[\text{GDGT-2}]+[\text{GDGT-3}]+[\text{cren}']}$$

GDGT ratio-2 is correlated to SST using the calibration equation:

TEX_{86}^{H} = 68.4×log(GDGT ratio-2) + 38.6.

TEX_{86}^{H} has a calibration error of ±2.0 °C and is based upon 255 core-top sediments.

TEX_{86}^{L} employs a combination of GDGTs that is different from TEX_{86}^{H}, removing GDGT-3 from the numerator and excluding cren' entirely:

$$\text{GDGT ratio-1}=\tfrac{[\text{GDGT-2}]}{[\text{GDGT-1}]+[\text{GDGT-2}]+[\text{GDGT-3}]}$$

GDGT ratio-1 is correlated to SST using the calibration equation:

TEX_{86}^{L} = 67.5×log(GDGT ratio-1) + 46.9.

TEX_{86}^{L}has a calibration error of ±4 °C and is based upon 396 core-top sediment samples.

Other calibrations exist (including 1/TEX_{86}, TEX_{86}' and pTEX_{86}) and should be considered when reconstructing temperature.

== Caveats ==
There are several caveats to this proxy and this list is by no means exhaustive. For more information, consult Schouten et al. 2013.

=== Terrestrial input ===
The branched vs isoprenoidal tetratether (BIT) index can used to measure the relative fluvial input of terrestrial organic matter (TOM) into the marine realm. The BIT index is based upon the premise that crenarchaeol is derived from marine-dwelling Nitrososphaerota and branched GDGTs are derived from terrestrial soil bacteria. When BIT values exceed 0.4, a deviation of >2 °C is incorporated into TEX_{86}-based SST estimates. However, isoprenoidal GDGTs can be synthesised on land (by terrestrial archaea) and can render BIT values unreliable; isoGDGT becomes more abundant with higher soil pH. A strong co-variation between GDGT-4 and branched GDGTs in modern marine and freshwater environments also suggests a common or mixed source for isoprenoidal and branched GDGTs (Fietz et al., 2012).

=== Anaerobic oxidation of methane (AOM) ===
The Methane Index (MI) was proposed to help distinguish the relative input of methanotrophic Euryarchaeota in settings characterised by diffuse methane flux and anaerobic oxidation of methane (AOM). These sites are characterised by a distinct GDGT distribution, namely the predominance of GDGT-1. -2 and -3. High MI values (>0.5) reflect high rates of gas-hydrate-related AOM.

=== Degradation ===
Thermal maturity is only thought to affect GDGTs when temperature exceed 240 °C. This can be tested using a ratio of specific hopane isomers. Oxic degradation, which is a selective process and degrades compounds at different rates, has been shown to affect TEX_{86} values and can bias SST values by up to 6 °C.

== Application ==
The oldest TEX_{86} record is from the middle Jurassic (~160Ma) and indicates relatively warm sea surface temperatures. TEX_{86} has been used to reconstruct temperature throughout the Cenozoic era (65–0 Ma) and is useful when other SST proxies are diagenetically altered (e.g. planktonic foraminifera) or absent (e.g. alkenones).

=== Eocene ===
TEX_{86} has been extensively used to reconstruct Eocene (55-34Ma) SST. During the early Eocene, TEX_{86} values indicate warm high southern hemisphere latitude SSTs (20-25 °C) in agreement with other, independently derived proxies (e.g. alkenones, CLAMP, Mg/Ca). During the middle and late Eocene, high southern latitude sites cooled while the tropics remained stable and warm. Possible reasons for this cooling include long-term changes in carbon dioxide and/or changes in gateway reorganisation (e.g. Tasman Gateway, Drake Passage).
