= Archaeol =

Ether lipid in archaea

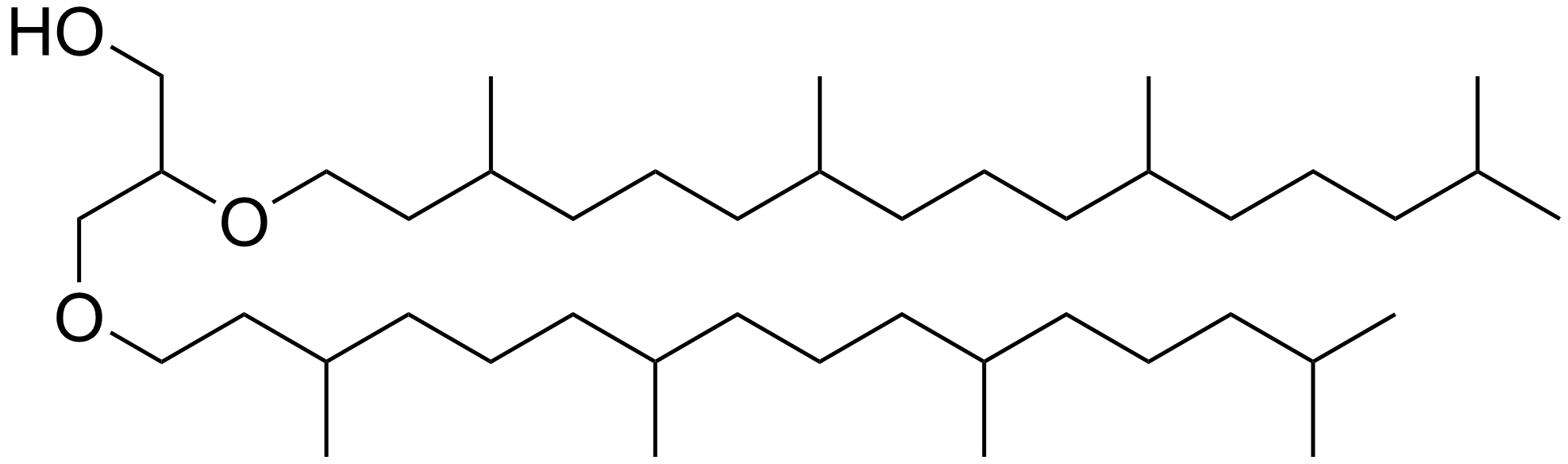

Names
- IUPAC name 2,3-Bis(3,7,11,15-tetramethylhexadecoxy)propan-1-ol
- Other names Archaeol lipid; 2,3-Di-O-phytanyl-sn-glycerol; 2,3-Bis[(3,7,11,15-tetramethylhexadecyl)oxy]-1-propanol

Identifiers
CAS Number	134108-16-0
3D model (JSmol)	Interactive image
ChEBI	CHEBI:202884
ChemSpider	369565
KEGG	C13863
MeSH	archaeol+lipid
PubChem CID	417493
CompTox Dashboard (EPA)	DTXSID80984011
- InChI: InChI=1S/C43H88O3/c1-35(2)17-11-19-37(5)21-13-23-39(7)25-15-27-41(9)29-31-45-34-43(33-44)46-32-30-42(10)28-16-26-40(8)24-14-22-38(6)20-12-18-36(3)4/h35-44H,11-34H2,1-10H3 Key: ISDBCJSGCHUHFI-UHFFFAOYSA-N
- SMILES: CC(C)CCCC(C)CCCC(C)CCCC(C)CCOCC(CO)OCCC(C)CCCC(C)CCCC(C)CCCC(C)C

Properties
Chemical formula	C_{43}H_{88}O_{3}
Molar mass	653.174 g·mol^{−1}
- Except where otherwise noted, data are given for materials in their standard state (at 25 °C [77 °F], 100 kPa). verify (what is ?) Infobox references

Archaeol is a diether composed of two phytanyl chains linked to the sn-2 and sn-3 positions of glycerol. As its phosphate ester, it is a common component of the membranes of archaea.

== Structure and contrast with other lipids ==
The 2,3-sn-glycerol structure and ether bond linkage are two key differences between lipids found in archaea vs those of bacteria and eukarya. The latter use 1,2-sn-glycerol, and mostly, ester bonds. Natural archaeol has 3R, 7R, 11R configurations for the three chiral centers in the isoprenoid chains. There are four structural variations, contributing to the complexity of the membrane lipids in function and properties. The two phytanyl chains can form a 36-member ring to yield macrocyclic archaeol. Hydroxylated archaeol has phytanyl chains hydroxylated at the first tertiary carbon atom, while sesterterpanyl archaeol have the phytanyl side chains with C25 sesterterpanyl chains, substituting at C2 of glycerol or at both carbons. Unsaturated archaeol, with the same carbon skeleton as standard archaeol but one or multiple double bonds in the phytanyl side chains is also discovered.

== Biological role and synthesis ==
Two archaeol molecules can undergo head-to-head linkage to form caldarchaeol (one typical glycerol dialkyl glycerol tetraether, GDGT), one of the most common tetraether lipids in archaea.

=== Biological role ===
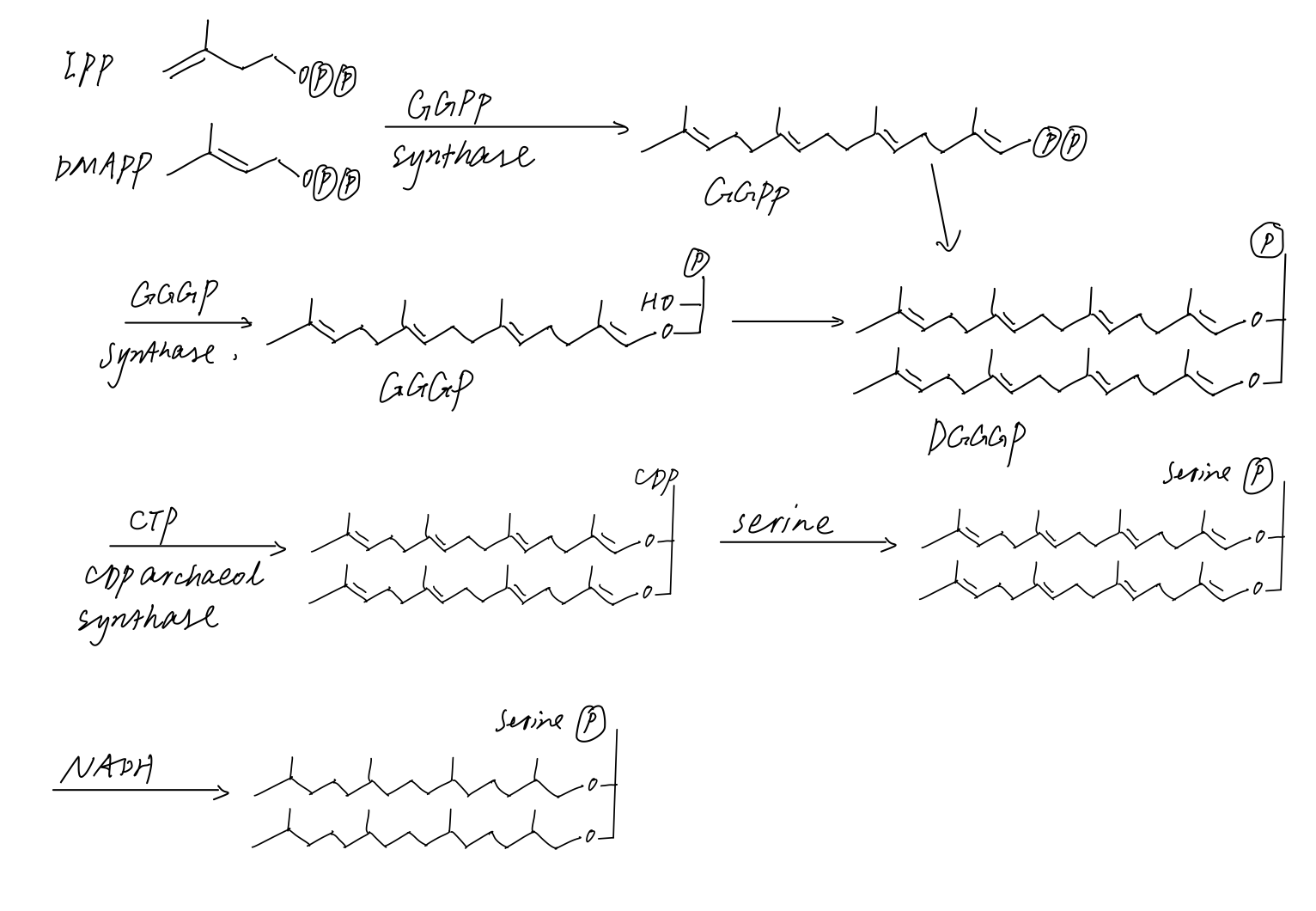
Synthesis of archaeol-based phospholipid in archaea. The isoprenoid side chains come from IPP and DMAPP, which are synthesized via alternate MVA pathways.

Archaeol has been found in all archaea so far, at least in trace amounts. It represents 100% of the diether core lipids in most neutrophilic halophiles and sulfur-dependent thermophiles (though their most core lipids are tetraether lipids). Methanogens contain hydroxyarchaeol and macrocyclic other than the standard archaeol, and sesterterpanyl-chain-containing archaeol is characteristic of alkaliphilic extreme halophiles. It is noteworthy that tetraether lipids are also widely present in archaea.

Liposomes (a spherical vesicle having at least at least one lipid bilayer) of lipids from archaea typically demonstrate extremely low permeability for molecules and ions, even including protons. The ion permeability induced by ionophores (ion transporters across the membranes) is also quite low, and only comparable to that of egg phosphatidylcholine (a very common biological membrane component) at 37˚C when the temperature rises up to c.a. 70˚C. Compared to bacteria and eukarya, the isoprenoid side chains of archaeol are highly branched. This structural difference is believed to lower the permeability of archaea over the whole growth temperature range which enables archaea to adapt to extreme environments.

=== Biosynthesis ===
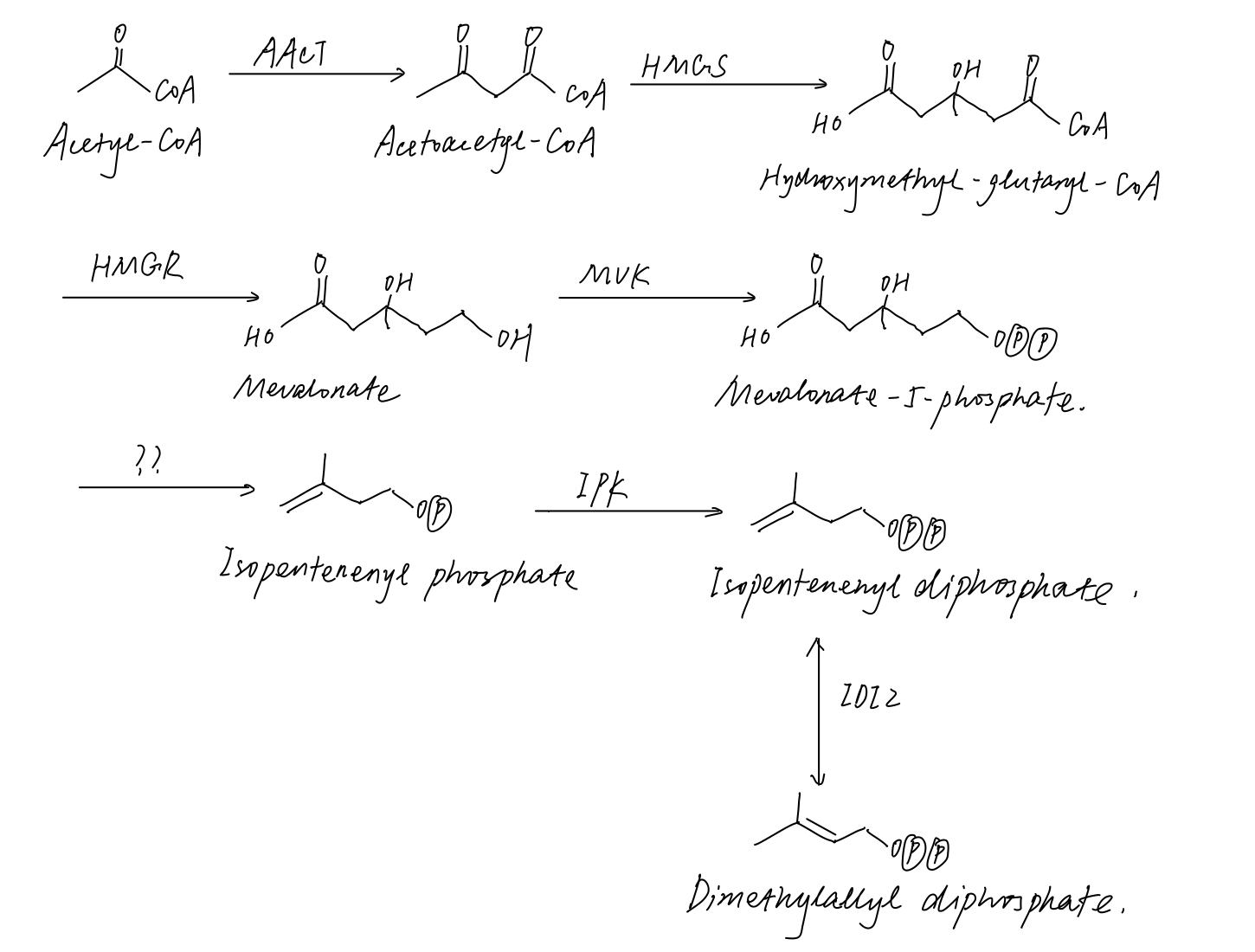
Alternate MVA pathway, occupied in archaea cells for synthesis of isoprenoid chains of archaeol. The last three steps (catalyzed by unknown enzyme ??, IPK and IDI2, respectively) differ from typical MVA pathway.

Geranylgeranylglycerol-1-X (X = phosphate, etc.), an intermediate in the biosynthesis of archaeol.

Archaeol's biosynthesis proceeds by a multistep process mediated by several enzymes. In simplified terms, glycerol 1-phosphate is etherified to two geranylgeranyl substituents contributed by geranylgeranyl pyrophosphate. The double bonds are reduced by nicotinamide and flavins. The phosphate group is subject to modification.

Archaea utilize biosynthetic pathways of isoprenoids that is distinct compared to bacteria and eukarya. The C5 precursors to the geranylgeranyl chains are isopentenyl pyrophosphate (IPP) and dimethylallyl pyrophosphate (DMAPP), which are produced by modified mevalonic acid pathway.

=== Ether lipids in bacteria ===
Though archaeol, featuring the ether linkage between isoprenoid chain to glycerol, has been considered as a biomarker for archaea, ether membrane lipids have also been discovered in some aerobic and anaerobic bacteria, including lipids with one ester bond and one ether bond to alkyl chains. Many strictly anoxic bacteria and a few aerobic species contain plasmalogens (Pla), which has an alkyl chain bound to sn-1 position of the glycerol via a vinyl-ether bond. Similar to archaea, these lipids are thought to increase the resistivity of bacteria to adverse environments. More stunning is the discovery of nonisoprenoid dialkyl glycerol diether lipids (DGD) and branched dialkyl glycerol tetraether lipids (brGDGT), which are formed, in the similar way to archaeol, by binding alkyls chains (but not isoprenoid chains) to glycerol molecules via ether linkage. It's highly notable that these lipids are only different from archaea ether lipids in the side chains and binding positions on the glycerol. DGD is reported in thermophilic bacteria, a few mesophilic bacteria and aggregating myxobacteria.

In 2018, a group from the University of Groningen managed to produce a large amount (30% of total phospholipids) of true archaeol-based phospholipid in transgenic E. coli. They found that the modified cells show higher tolerance to heat and cold. The result builds on top of their earlier 2015 attempt, which produced only a minuscule amount.

== As a lipid biomarker ==
Archaeol in the sediments typically originates from the hydrolysis of archaea membrane phospholipids during diagenesis. Due to its high preservation potential, it is often detected and used by organic geochemists as a biomarker for archaea activity, especially for methanogen biomass and activity. As a methanogen proxy, it is used by Michinari Sunamura et al. to directly measure the methanogens in the sediments of Tokyo Bay, and also used by Katie L. H. Lim et al. as an indicator of methanogenesis in water-saturated soils. C. A. McCartney et al. used it as a proxy for methane production in cattle.

In the meantime, it is also used to help understand ancient biogeochemistry. It was used as a biomarker by Richard D. Pancost et al. in order to reconstruct the Holocene biogeochemistry in ombrotrophic peatlands. A pilot study led by Ian D. Bull et al. also used archaeol as a biomarker to reveal the differences between fermenting digestive systems in foregut and hindgut of ancient herbivorous mammals.

Additionally, because of different degradation kinetics of intact archaeol and caldarchaeol, the ratio of archaeol to caldarchaeol was proposed as a salinity proxy in highland lakes, providing a tool for paleosalinity studies.

Archaeol can also get hydrolyzed in some cases, with its side chains preserved as phytane or pristane, depending on the redox conditions.

== Measurement ==
To analyze archaeol, lipids are commonly extracted via the traditional Bligh-Dyer procedure, usually followed by fractionation (by thin layer or column chromatography) and derivatization. Kazuhiro Demizu et al. and Sadami Ohtsubo et al. proposed similar processes involving acid Bligh and Dyer extraction, acid treatment and derivatization, with the core lipids finally being subjected to chromatography.

To determine the concentration of archaeol present in a sample, chromatography technologies are commonly employed, including high-performance liquid chromatography (HPLC), gas chromatography (GC), and supercritical fluid chromatography (SFC), with mass spectrometry (MS) often applied to aid the identification.

== See also ==
- Diacylglycerol
- Caldarchaeol
- id:Archaeol
