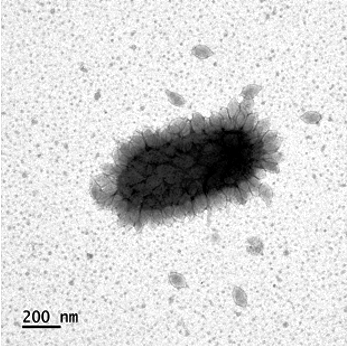
- Nitrosopumilus maritimus, partially with virions of Nitrosopumilus spindle-shaped virus 1 (Thaspiviridae) attached.

Scientific classification
- Domain: Archaea
- Kingdom: Thermoproteati
- Phylum: Thermoproteota
- Class: Nitrososphaeria; Stieglmeier et al. 2014

Orders
- Conexivisphaerales; Nitrososphaerales; Nitrosopumilales; Nitrosotaleales

Synonyms
- Conexivisphaeria Kato et al. 2021; "Geothermarchaeota" Jungbluth, Amend & Rappe 2016; "Nitrososphaeraeota" Oren et al. 2015; "Nitrososphaerota" Whitman et al. 2018; "Thaumarchaeota" Brochier-Armanet et al. 2008

= Nitrososphaeria =

Phylum of archaea

Nitrososphaeria (previously phylum Nitrososphaerota or Thaumarchaeota) is a class of Archaea under the phylum Thermoproteota. The first species, Cenarchaeum symbiosum, was discovered in 1996 and was found to have a genome distinct from other known archaea at the time; hence, it was classified as a separate phylum. A decade later, three ammonia-oxidizing archaea were described, Nitrosopumilus maritimus, Nitrososphaera viennensis, and Nitrososphaera gargensis. Genome analysis in 2010 revealed that C. symbiosum and the three archaea are genetically of the same group.

Taxonomic reassessment in 2021 merged the archaeal group to the phylum Thermoproteota. Most species of Nitrososphaeria are chemolithoautotrophic ammonia-oxidizers and may play important roles in biogeochemical cycles, such as the nitrogen cycle and the carbon cycle. Metagenomic sequencing indicates that they constitute ~1% of the sea surface metagenome across many sites. The lipid crenarchaeol has been found only in Nitrososphaeria, making it a potential biomarker for the class.

Nitrososphaeria-derived membrane-spanning tetraether lipids (glycerol dialkyl glycerol tetraethers; GDGTs) from marine sediments can be used to reconstruct past temperatures via the TEX_{86} paleotemperature proxy, as these lipids vary in structure according to temperature. Because most Nitrososphaeria seem to be autotrophs that fix CO_{2}, their GDGTs can act as a record for past Carbon-13 ratios in the dissolved inorganic carbon pool, and thus have the potential to be used for reconstructions of the carbon cycle in the past.

== Taxonomy ==
In 1996, biologists at the University of California discovered archaea present in a sponge (Axinella sp.) which they had collected from the offshore of Santa Barbara. Genetic analysis showed that the archaea was different but related to Crenarchaeota, the major group of archaea known at the time. As a distinct species, it was named Cenarchaeum symbiosum. Further studies based on ribosomal RNA genes and DNA polymerase began to indicate that the archaea was not closely related to Crenarchaeota.

In 2005, a team of German and American biologists at the University of Washington discovered ammonia-oxidizing archaea from various water sources around Seattle and gave the name Nitrosopumilus maritimus. It was classified under the phylum Crenarchaeota. Another related ammonia-oxidizing archaea, Nitrososphaera gargensis, was discovered in 2008 from Siberian Garga hot spring. By then, C. symbiosum was established as capable of oxidizing ammonia. Genome sequence showed that the group differ significantly from other members of the hyperthermophilic Crenarchaeota . Two phyla of archaea were recognized: Crenarchaeota and Euryarchaeota. Since the genetic difference of the ammonia-oxidizing archaea was huge from member of the two existing phyla, a third phylum Thaumarchaeota was introduced in 2008. The classification was based on phylogenetic data, such as the sequences of these organisms' ribosomal RNA genes, and the presence of a form of type I topoisomerase that was previously thought to be unique to the eukaryotes.

In 2014, Nitrososphaera viennensis was discovered from a garden soil in Vienna, Austria, for which Michaela Stieglmeier and her colleagues created the taxonomic hierarchy, family Nitrososphaeraceae, order Nitrososphaerales and class Nitrososphaeria. International Code of Nomenclature of Prokaryotes (ICNP, Prokaryotic Code), Aharon Oren and George M. Garrity fomralized in 2021 the phylum as Nitrososphaerota for the ammonia-oxidizing archaea, since Stieglmeier's classification was the first valid publication. At the same time, a team of Australian scientists led by Christian Rinke and Philip Hugenholtz published a new classification on archaea, in which they merged Crenarchaeota and Nitrososphaerota (in fact the entire TACK superphylum) into the phylum Thermoproteota, thereby demoting the phylum to the class level.

== Classification and diversity ==
Phylogeny of Nitrososphaeria

- Nitrososphaeria
  - - Conexivisphaerales
      - Conexivisphaeraceae
        Conexivisphaera
  - - - Nitrososphaerales
        - Nitrososphaeraceae
          Nitrososphaera
    - - Nitrosotaleales
        - Nitrosotaleaceae
          Nitrosotalea
      - Nitrosopumilales
        - Nitrosopumilaceae
          - Nitrosarchaeum
          - Nitrosopumilus

The currently accepted taxonomy is based on the List of Prokaryotic names with Standing in Nomenclature (LPSN) and National Center for Biotechnology Information (NCBI)

Phylogeny of Nitrososphaeria

- Nitrososphaeria
  - - "Geothermarchaeales"
      - "Geothermarchaeaceae"
        - "Ca. Geothermarchaeum"
        - "Ca. Scotarchaeum"
  - - - PSMU01
        - PSMU01
          "Ca. Australarchaeum"
    - - Conexivisphaerales
        - Conexivisphaeraceae
          Conexivisphaera
        - "Thermosulfuridaceae"
          "Acidarchaeum"
      - Nitrososphaerales
        - - "Gagatemarchaeaceae"
            "Ca. Gagatemarchaeum"
        - - - "Nitrosomiraceae"
              "Ca. Nitrosomirus"
            - "Nitrosocaldaceae"
              - "Ca. Nitrosothermus"
              - "Ca. Nitrosocaldus"
          - - Nitrososphaeraceae
              - "Ca. Nitrosobungeria"
              - - "Ca. Nitrosopolaris"
                - - Nitrososphaera
                  - - "Ca. Nitrosomicrobium"
                    - "Ca. Nitrosocosmicus"
            - Nitrosopumilaceae
              - Nitrosotalea
              - - "Ca. Nitrosotenuis"
                - - "Ca. Nitrosopelagicus"
                  - - "Ca. Nitrosoabyssus"
                    - - "Cenarchaeum"
                      - - Nitrosarchaeum
                        - - "Ca. Nitrosomaritimum"
                          - Nitrosopumilus

- Class Nitrososphaeria Stieglmeier et al. 2014 [Conexivisphaeria Kato et al. 2020]
  - ?"Cenoporarchaeum" corrig. Zhang et al. 2019
  - ?"Candidatus Giganthauma" Muller et al. 2010
  - ?"Candidatus Nitrosodeserticola" Hwang et al. 2021
  - Order "Geothermarchaeales" Adam et al. 2022
    - Family Geothermarchaeaceae Adam et al. 2022
      - "Candidatus Geothermarchaeum" Adam et al. 2022
      - "Candidatus Scotarchaeum" Adam et al. 2022
  - Order PSMU01
    - Family PSMU01
      - "Candidatus Australarchaeum" Herbold et al. 2024
  - Order Conexivisphaerales Kato et al. 2020
    - Family Conexivisphaeraceae Kato et al. 2020
      - Conexivisphaera Kato et al. 2020
    - Family "Thermosulfuridaceae" Chang et al. 2026 [UBA164]
      - "Acidarchaeum" Chang et al. 2026 [JAJZYL01]
      - ?"Thermosulfuris" Chang et al. 2026
  - Order "Methylarchaeales" Ou et al. 2022
    - Family Methylarchaeaceae Hua et al. 2019
      - ?"Candidatus Methylarchaeum" Hua et al. 2019
      - ?"Candidatus Methanotowutia" Ou et al. 2022
  - Order "Nitrosocaldales" de la Torre et al. 2008
    - Family "Nitrosocaldaceae" Qin et al. 2016
      - "Candidatus Nitrosocaldus" de la Torre et al. 2008
      - "Candidatus Nitrosothermus" Luo et al. 2021
  - Order "Nitrosomirales" Zheng et al. 2024
    - Family "Nitrosomiraceae" Zheng et al. 2024
      - "Candidatus Nitrosomirus" Zheng et al. 2024 [UBA213]
  - Order Nitrososphaerales Stieglmeier et al. 2014
    - Family "Gagatemarchaeaceae" Sheridan et al. 2023
      - "Candidatus Gagatemarchaeum" Sheridan et al. 2023
      - ?"Candidatus Subgagatemarchaeum" Sheridan et al. 2023 [Fn1; IMG2558309099]
    - Family Nitrososphaeraceae Stieglmeier et al. 2014
      - "Candidatus Nitrosobungeria" Tan et al. 2026 [TH5893]
      - "Candidatus Nitrosocosmicus" Lehtovirta-Morley et al. 2016
      - "Candidatus Nitrosomicrobium" Tan et al. 2026 [TA-21]
      - "Candidatus Nitrosopolaris" Pessi, Rutanen & Hultman 2022
      - ?"Candidatus Nitrososappho" Singleton et al. 2025
      - Nitrososphaera Stieglmeier et al. 2014
  - Order Nitrosopumilales Qin et al. 2017
    - Family Nitrosopumilaceae Qin et al. 2017
      - "Cenarchaeum" DeLong & Preston 1996
      - Nitrosarchaeum corrig. Jung et al. 2018
      - "Candidatus Nitrosoabyssus" Garritano et al. 2024
      - ?"Candidatus Nitrosokoinonia" Glasl et al. 2023
      - "Candidatus Nitrosomaritimum" Zhao et al. 2024
      - "Candidatus Nitrosopelagicus" Santoro et al. 2015
      - Nitrosopumilus Qin et al. 2017
      - ?"Candidatus Nitrosospongia" Moeller et al. 2019
      - Nitrosotalea Lehtovirta 2024
      - "Candidatus Nitrosotenuis" Li et al. 2016

== Metabolism ==
Nitrososphaeria are important ammonia oxidizers in aquatic and terrestrial environments, and are the first archaea identified as being involved in nitrification. They are capable of oxidizing ammonia at much lower substrate concentrations than ammonia-oxidizing bacteria, and so probably dominate in oligotrophic conditions. Their ammonia oxidation pathway requires less oxygen than that of ammonia-oxidizing bacteria, so they do better in environments with low oxygen concentrations like sediments and hot springs. Ammonia-oxidizing Nitrososphaeria can be identified metagenomically by the presence of archaeal ammonia monooxygenase (amoA) genes, which indicate that they are overall more dominant than ammonia oxidizing bacteria. In addition to ammonia, at least one Nitrososphaeria strain has been shown to be able to use urea as a substrate for nitrification. This would allow for competition with phytoplankton that also grow on urea. One study of microbes from wastewater treatment plants found that not all Nitrososphaeria that express amoA genes are active ammonia oxidizers. These Nitrososphaeria may be capable of oxidizing methane instead of ammonia, or they may be heterotrophic, indicating a potential for a diversity of metabolic lifestyles within the phylum. Marine Nitrososphaeria have also been shown to produce nitrous oxide, which as a greenhouse gas has implications for climate change. Isotopic analysis indicates that most nitrous oxide flux to the atmosphere from the ocean, which provides around 30% of the natural flux, may be due to the metabolic activities of archaea.

Many members of the phylum assimilate carbon by fixing HCO_{3}^{−}. This is done using a hydroxypropionate/hydroxybutyrate cycle similar to the Thermoproteota but which appears to have evolved independently. All Nitrososphaeria that have been identified by metagenomics thus far encode this pathway. Notably, the Nitrososphaeria CO_{2}-fixation pathway is more efficient than any known aerobic autotrophic pathway. This efficiency helps explain their ability to thrive in low-nutrient environments. Some Nitrososphaeria such as Nitrosopumilus maritimus are able to incorporate organic carbon as well as inorganic, indicating a capacity for mixotrophy. At least two isolated strains have been identified as obligate mixotrophs, meaning they require a source of organic carbon in order to grow.

A study has revealed that Nitrososphaeria are most likely the dominant producers of the critical vitamin B12. This finding has important implications for eukaryotic phytoplankton, many of which are auxotrophic and must acquire vitamin B_{12} from the environment; thus the Nitrososphaeria could play a role in algal blooms and by extension global levels of atmospheric carbon dioxide. Because of the importance of vitamin B_{12} in biological processes such as the citric acid cycle and DNA synthesis, production of it by the Nitrososphaeria may be important for a large number of aquatic organisms.

== Environment ==
Many Nitrososphaeria, such as Nitrosopumilus maritimus, are marine and live in the open ocean. Most of these planktonic Nitrososphaeria, which compose the Marine Group I.1a, are distributed in the subphotic zone, between 100m and 350m. Other marine Nitrososphaeria live in shallower waters. One study has identified two novel Nitrososphaeria species living in the sulfidic environment of a tropical mangrove swamp. Of these two species, Candidatus Giganthauma insulaporcus and Candidatus Giganthauma karukerense, the latter is associated with Gammaproteobacteria with which it may have a symbiotic relationship, though the nature of this relationship is unknown. The two species are very large, forming filaments larger than ever before observed in archaea. As with many Nitrososphaeria, they are mesophilic. Genetic analysis and the observation that the most basal identified Nitrososphaeria genomes are from hot environments suggests that the ancestor of Nitrososphaeria was thermophilic, and mesophily evolved later.

== See also ==
List of Archaea genera
