= Cenarchaeum =

Scientific classification (Candidatus)
- Domain: Archaea
- Kingdom: Thermoproteati
- Phylum: Thermoproteota
- Class: Nitrososphaeria
- Order: Nitrosopumilales
- Family: Nitrosopumilaceae
- Genus: Cenarchaeum; Preston, Wu, Molinski & De Long, 1996
- Species: C. symbiosum

Binomial name
- Cenarchaeum symbiosum Preston, Wu, Molinski & De Long, 1996

Genus of archaea

Cenarchaeum is a monotypic genus of archaeans in the family Nitrosopumilaceae. The marine archaean Cenarchaeum symbiosum is psychrophilic and is found inhabiting marine sponges. Cenarchaeum symbiosum was initially detected as a major symbiotic microorganism living within (it is an endosymbiont of) the sponge Axinella mexicana. It has been ubiquitously detected in the world oceans at lower abundances, while in some genera of marine sponges it is one of the most abundant microbiome members. Its genome sequence and diversity has been investigated in detail finding unique metabolic products and its role in ammonia-oxidizing activities.

== Genome ==
The genome of C. symbiosum is estimated to be 2.02 Million bp in length, with a predicted amount of 2011 genes.

== Ecology ==
Cenarchaeum symbiosum is a psychrophilic organism capable of surviving and proliferating at low temperatures usually ranging from 7-19 Celsius. C. symbiosum has a symbiotic relationship with certain varieties of sponge species, usually living in 10-20 meter depths, typically near California.

== See also ==
- List of Archaea genera
