= Glycerol dialkyl glycerol tetraether =

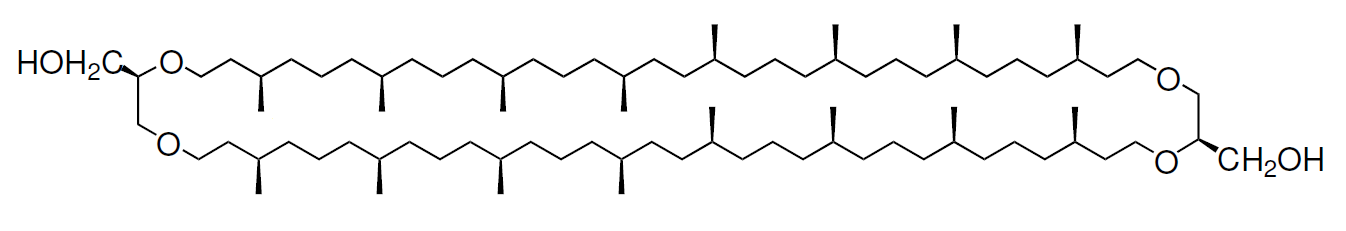
Chemical structure of caldarchaeol, a prototypical GDGT

Glycerol dialkyl glycerol tetraether lipids (GDGTs) are a class of membrane lipids synthesized by archaea and some bacteria, making them useful biomarkers for these organisms in the geological record. Their presence, structure, and relative abundances in natural materials can be useful as proxies for temperature, terrestrial organic matter input, and soil pH for past periods in Earth history. Some structural forms of GDGT form the basis for the TEX86 paleothermometer. Isoprenoid GDGTs, now known to be synthesized by many archaeal classes, were first discovered in extremophilic archaea cultures. Branched GDGTs, likely synthesized by acidobacteriota, were first discovered in a natural Dutch peat sample in 2000.

The phospholipid built from a two-headed tetraether lipid is often called a bolalipid. In a membrane bilayer, a bolalipid can appear in a straight "O-shape" conformation where it spans both sides, or appear in a U-shaped conformation where its two phosphate heads are on the same side.

== Chemical structure ==
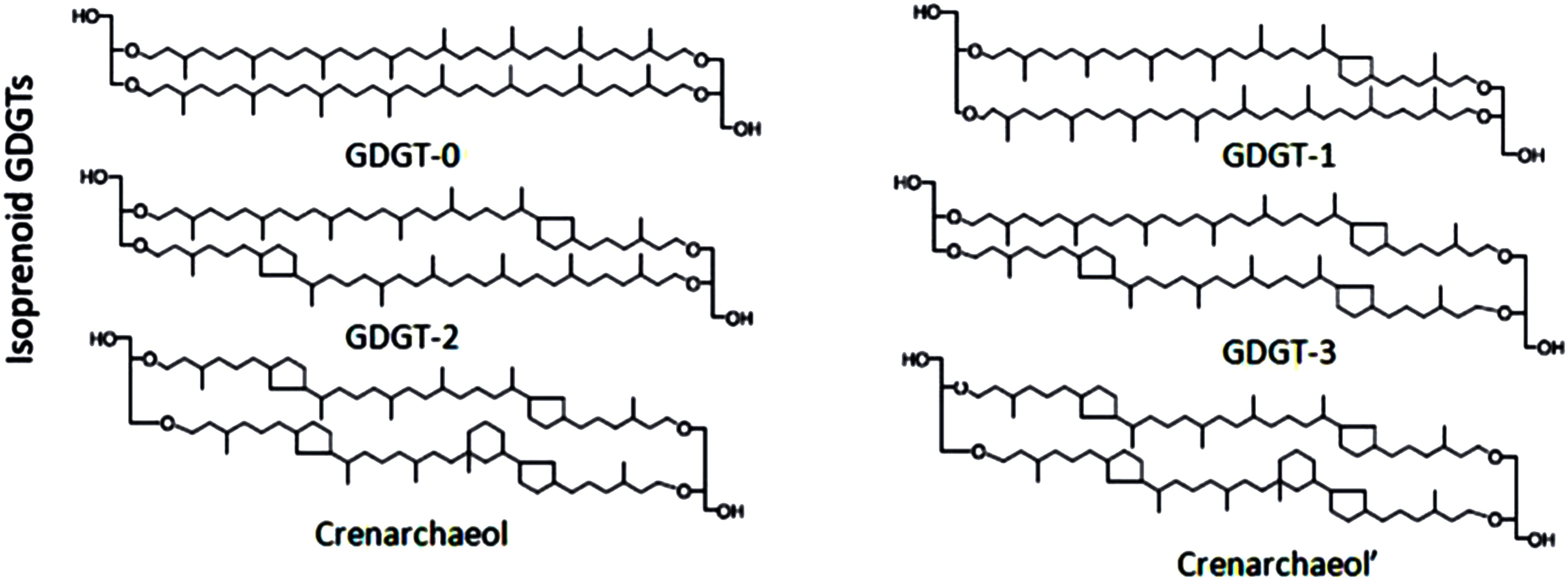
Chemical structures of representative isoprenoid GDGTs

The chemical nature of GDGTs is succinctly described by its name: they consist of two glycerol molecules connected via two alkyl chains, being held together at four ether linkages. In the living microbe, they are attached to two phosphate head groups that allow them to work as membrane phospholipids. Compared to the typical lipid bilayer in eukaryotes and most bacteria, GDGT-diphosphates differ by having two headgroups, which allow one molecule to do the job of two typical phospholipids (allowing monolayers in water) and resist heat better. They are also connected by ether, instead of ester, bonds.

The two primary structural classes of GDGTs are isoprenoid (isoGDGT) and branched (brGDGT), which refer to differences in the carbon skeleton structures.

- Isoprenoid compounds are numbered -0 through -8, with the numeral representing the number of cyclopentane rings present within the carbon skeleton structure. The exception is crenarchaeol, a Nitrososphaerota product with one cyclohexane ring moiety in addition to four cyclopentane rings.
- Branched GDGTs have zero, one, or two cyclopentane moieties and are further classified based the positioning of their branches. They are numbered with roman numerals and letters.
  - The roman numeral describes the total amount of modifications, summing branches and cyclopentane moieties. "I" indicates 4, "II" indicates 5, and "III" indicates 6. The simplest brGDGT is GDGT-I, with four methyls.
  - A lowercase suffix means that some modifications are cyclopentanes instead of methyl branches. a means one cyclopentane, b means two, and vice versa. For example, GDGT-IIb is a compound with three branches and two cyclopentane moieties (a total of five modifications).

== Biological origin ==
Isoprenoid GDGTs originate as archaeal membrane lipids, whose fatty acids are converted to glycerol via esterification (ether lipid). They were first recognized as being associated with extremophilic archaea, but research in recent decades has discovered the compounds in a wide range of mesophilic environments as well, including soils, lake sediment, and marine deposits. Archaeal phylogenetic classes Nitrososphaerota (formerly Thaumarchaeota), Thermoproteota (formerly Crenarchaeota), "Euryarchaeota", and "Korarchaeota" produce GDGTs.

Branched GDGTs are most commonly detected in peats and soils and are most associated with terrestrial settings. To date, no direct evidence for an unequivocal source organism has been reported, but the structural similarity of acidobacterial lipid to brGDGT alkyl chains strongly suggests that acidobacteriota synthesize brGDGT. The stereochemistry strongly hints at a non-archaeal origin.

=== GDGT-0 ===
GDGT-0 has zero cyclopentane moieties and is the most ubiquitous isoGDGT synthesized by archaea. Halophilic archaea are the only group of archaea not known to produce GDGT-0. Carbon isotope analyses and association with sites of anaerobic methane oxidation suggest that GDGT-0 is produced via methanotrophs. In microbiology literature not dealing with the geological record, GDGT-0 is sometimes referred to as caldarchaeol.

=== GDGT-1 – GDGT-4 ===
GDGT-1, GDGT-2, and GDGT-3 have one, two, and three cyclopentane rings respectively within their isoprenoid biphytane carbon structures, respectively. Nitrososphaerota are the largest producers of these groups in marine and lacustrine environments. Methanogens are not thought to be large synthesizers of these molecules, with the exception of Methanopyrus kandleri, which does produce them. These classes are lower in abundance than GDGT-0 and GDGRT-4. They are used in the TEX86 paleothermometer.

GDGT-4 refers to the version with four cyclopentane rings. It is quite abundant (although not easy to differentiate from crenarchaeol on GC/MS, see below). Nitrososphaerota also makes GDGT-4.

=== Crenarchaeol ===
Crenarchaeol is mainly attributed to ammonium-oxidizing Nitrososphaerota and has four cyclopentane rings plus one cyclohexane ring, which distinguishes it from GDGT-4 and is unique to the Nitrososphaerota phylum. The evolution of the cyclohexane ring was likely to adjust the density of the membrane packing to more optimally function at the cooler ocean temperatures to which Nitrososphaerota adapted. Due to their structural similarities, crenarchaeol and GDGT-4 have similar GC/MS elution times. They are similar in prevalence to GDGT-0 and therefore are not included in the TEX_{86} paleothermometer because their abundance overwhelms the less abundant GDGT groups.

A crenarchaeol regioisomer, however, is a part of the TEX_{86} paleothermometer. This isomer likely differs by having a cis configuration on the cyclopentane ring neighboring the additional cyclohexane ring. It is presumed to be also made by Nitrososphaerota.

=== GDGT-5 – GDGT-8 ===
GDGTs -5 through -8 are nearly exclusive to extreme high-temperature environments such as hot springs. The larger number of cyclopentane moieties facilitates a more densely packed membrane lipid structure, which better inhibits trans-membrane passage of protons and ions. Doing so increases the molecules' thermal stability, which is necessary to survive at extreme temperatures.

Two proteins responsible for making these GDGTs were identified in Sulfolobus acidocaldarius, a thermoacidophile. grsA is responsible for producing the four cyclopentane rings at the C7 position (also seen in less ring-rich GDGTs), while grsB cyclizes at the unique C3 position. Homologs of the two genes are found throughout Nitrososphaerota.

=== brGDGT ===
The building blocks of brGDGT, specifically the long alkyl groups (iso-diabolic acid), are detected in acidobacteria subdivisions 1, 3, 4, and 6. Small amounts of brGDGT-I was detected in Acidobacteriaceae strain A2-4c by full mass spectrum and tentatively in Acidobacteriaceae strain 307 by single-ion monitoring MS; none has been detected in the 44 other strains tested as of 2018. More complex brGDGTs known from nature have not yet been detected in any cell culture.

== GDGT-based proxies ==
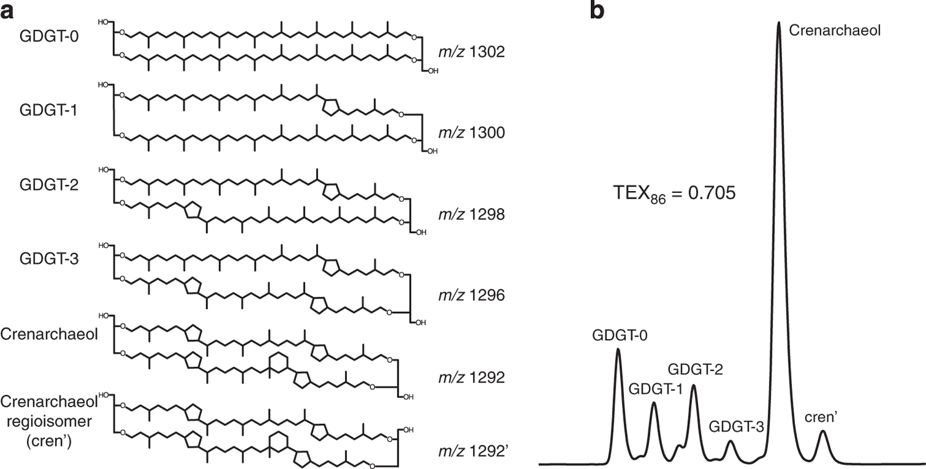
Molecular structures and HPLC detection of GDGTs. Retrieved from Tierney and Tingley (2015).

=== TEX86 ===
Because the number of cyclopentane moieties in a GDGT compound is related to the temperature of the growth environment, with increasing numbers of cyclopentane rings resulting in increased thermal stability and allowing for survival at higher temperatures, GDGT distribution and abundance can be employed as paleoclimate proxies. TEX86 is one such paleothermometer which relates distribution and relative abundance of GDGT-1, GDGT-2, GDGT-3, and crenarchaeol isomer to past sea surface temperature (SST) (see TEX86). GDGT-0, GDGT-4, and crenarchaeol are excluded from consideration for this proxy due to their very high abundances relative to isoGDGTs 1–3. The relationship between isoGDGT distribution and temperature is not linear, and some studies have demonstrated its distinctive bias towards unrealistically cold temperatures in the lower latitudes. Current research suggests TEX86 works best in the temperature range 15-34 degrees Celsius. Seasonal variability in archaeal productivity and depth in the water column at which the archaea grow should be considered prior to employing this proxy.

=== BIT Index ===
The branched:isoprenoid tetraether (BIT) index relates the relative abundances of brGDGTs in a natural sample to the relative abundance of soil organic matter in that sample. It is calculated by ratioing a sum of bacterially-produced brGDGT abundances over a sum of archaeal isoGDGT abundances and is based on the fundamental idea that brGDGTs are produced most commonly in terrestrial environments (most ubiquitous in soils and peats) while archaeal isoGDGTs (particularly crenarchaeol) are produced in marine environments. While caveats and analytical uncertainties remain an issue, the BIT index is a potentially useful proxy for assessing the amount of fluvially transported soil organic matter compared to marine organic matter.

=== MBT/CBT index ===
The methylation of branched tetraethers (MBT) and cyclization of branched tetraethers (CBT) indices relate abundances and distributions of bacterially-produced brGDGTs to relative changes in soil pH and mean annual air temperature. Further research is needed to assess seasonal bias, appropriate calibration protocols, and whether the brGDGT distributions record air or soil temperature.

== Measurement techniques ==
GDGTs are identified via organic geochemical analysis as the polar head groups of the membrane lipids. High-precision liquid chromatography mass spectrometry (HPLC-MS) is the primary means by which GDGTs are analyzed due to this method's tolerance for high temperatures.
