= Biphytane =

Names
- IUPAC name 3,7,11,15,18,22,26,30-Octamethyldotriacontane

Identifiers
CAS Number	84296-10-6
3D model (JSmol)	Interactive image
ChemSpider	57509546
PubChem CID	13797360
CompTox Dashboard (EPA)	DTXSID30549770
- InChI: InChI=1S/C40H82/c1-11-33(3)19-13-21-35(5)23-15-25-37(7)27-17-29-39(9)31-32-40(10)30-18-28-38(8)26-16-24-36(6)22-14-20-34(4)12-2/h33-40H,11-32H2,1-10H3 Key: WEHKMXJXZKAYRJ-UHFFFAOYSA-N
- SMILES: CCC(C)CCCC(C)CCCC(C)CCCC(C)CCC(C)CCCC(C)CCCC(C)CCCC(C)CC

Properties
Chemical formula	C_{40}H_{84}
Molar mass	565.112 g/mol
- Except where otherwise noted, data are given for materials in their standard state (at 25 °C [77 °F], 100 kPa). Infobox references

Biphytane (or bisphytane) is a C_{40} isoprenoid produced from glycerol dialkyl glycerol tetraether (GDGT) degradation. As a common lipid membrane component, biphytane is widely used as a biomarker for archaea. In particular, given its association with sites of active anaerobic oxidation of methane (AOM), it is considered a biomarker of methanotrophic archaea. It has been found in both marine and terrestrial environments.

== Chemical structure ==
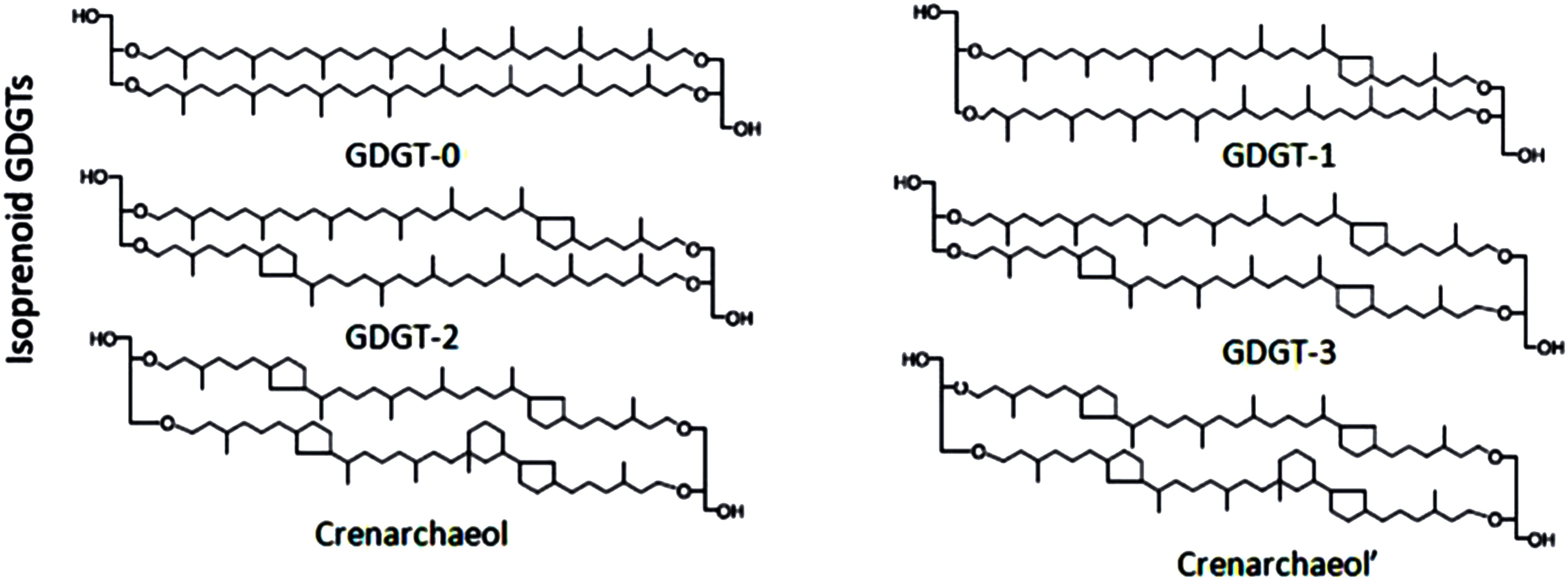
Molecular structures of isoprenoid GDGTs containing 0–4 cyclopentane rings (GDGT-0 to GDGT-4).

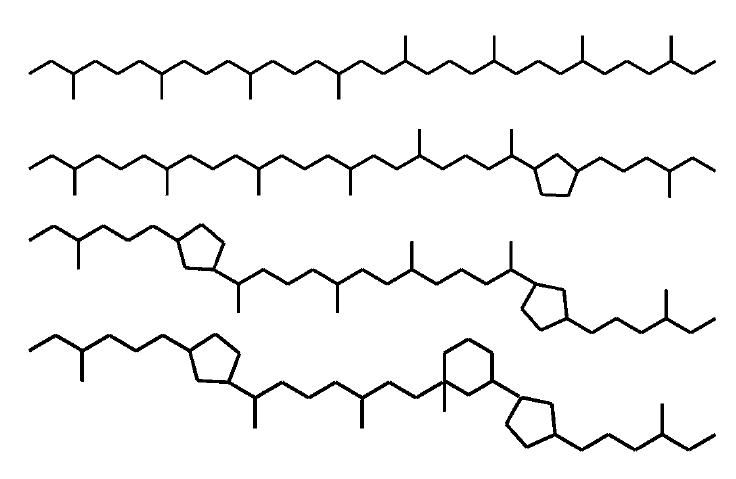
Structures of biphytane with increasing degree of cyclization from top (acyclic) to bottom (with three cycloalkyl rings).

Glycerol dialkyl glycerol tetraethers (GDGT) are major membrane lipids synthesized by archaea and some bacteria. In particular, isoprenoid GDGTs are characterized by isoprenoid carbon chains connected to the glycerol molecules by ether bonds. Biphytane is produced by the chemical cleavage of the ether bonds within isoprenoid GDGT (GDGT-0). It is composed of isoprene units bound by ether bonds with six isoprene units (or two phytanes) linked together by a head-to-head linkage.

Biphytane can be found in cyclic forms containing one to three pentacyclic rings when derived from isoprenoid GDGTs with such biosynthetically cyclized isoprenoid carbon skeletons. In most analyzed samples from the environment, the acyclic form with biphytane as the isoprenoid carbon chain is typically the most abundant form. Hence, in this article, biphytane is used to refer to the acyclic form unless stated otherwise.

== Biological origin ==
As it occurs within GDGT, biphytane has been detected in the water column, marine sediments, hydrothermally-influenced sediments, cold seep sediments dominated by anaerobic oxidation of methane activity, and limestone. Though it had been primarily studied in aquatic settings, recent studies have also started investigating terrestrial environments, such as peat bogs where the source of biphytane was identified as methanogenic peat archaea. Studies have reported the detection of biphytane in petroleum as well.

While early studies had considered GDGTs (and hence biphytane) to be biomarkers of extremophilic archaea, both indirect and direct evidence of GDGT originating from archaea of mesophilic marine environments or lacustrine environments with non-extreme pH and salinity have been available since the late 1970s. Because biphytane in particular has been widely detected in sties of active AOM activity, it is considered a biomarker of methanotrophic archaea.

Analogous to sterols in eukaryotic membranes, GDGT plays a similar role in improving the rigidity of archaeal cell membranes. Supporting this, it has been reported that thermophiles increase the degree of cyclization with increasing growth temperatures to further improve membrane fluidity.

== Measurement techniques ==
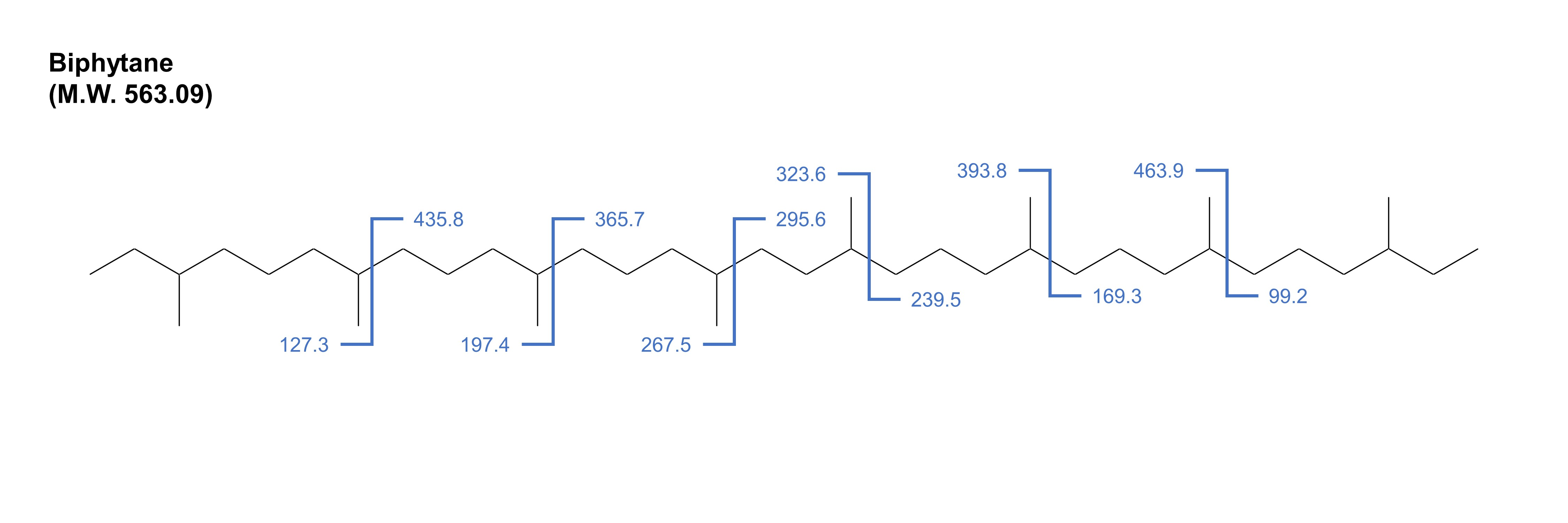
Mass spectral fragment ions characteristic of (acyclic) biphytane. Blue lines mark the location of fragmentation and the associated numbers correspond to the resulting ion fragments' m/z values.

Typically, biphytane measurement is performed as an indirect analysis of GDGT. When chemically deriving biphytane from such ether lipids, the ether bonds are first cleaved using hydrogen iodide (HI), boron trichloride (BCl_{3}), or boron tribromide (BBr_{3}) that produces alkyl halides. Then, the alkyl halides are either reduced to saturated hydrocarbons using HI/NaSCH_{3} or LiAlH_{4} or converted to methylthioesthers with NaSCH_{3}. The obtained saturated or derivatized hydrocarbons can subsequently be separated and measured using standard gas chromatography-mass spectrometry (GC-MS) procedures.

Alternatively, direct analysis of GDGT can be done with liquid chromatography but, when further structural characterization is required, MS fragments characteristic of biphytane can be obtained via high-performance liquid chromatography linked to tandem mass spectrometry (HPLC-MS/MS).

The diagnostic mass spectral fragment ions for biphytane are m/z 197, 259, 267, 323, 383, 393, and 463. Because the cyclic biphytanes yield different mass spectral fragment ions, the modified forms of biphytane present in a sample can be differentiated.

== Application as a biomarker ==
Biphytane is considered to have a relatively high stability given its detection in high abundance within both recent and ancient sediments and petroleum, suggesting its ability to persist thermal maturation. Whether biphytane degrades to shorter isoprenoids over time remains unclear.

Biphytane is a well-established biomarker of archaea since it is found exclusively in archaea and all major groups except for halophilic Archaea. When combined with other analyses, it could be used to gain further insight into the analyzed sample. For instance, the abundance ratio of the biphytane (both acyclic and cyclic) to phytane has been used to distinguish between different groups of anaerobic methanotrophic archaea (ANME) from marine sediments given its higher abundance in ANME-1 than -2.

Alternatively, δ^{13}C measurements could be combined to further confirm the origin. Because methanotrophs utilize isotopically light carbon sources, they are characterized by very negative carbon isotope values (i.e. depleted in ^{13}C). For example, by comparing δ^{13}C values of biphytanic diacids and GDGT-derived biphytane from the same seep limestones, a study inferred that, despite the chemical similarity of the compounds, they likely were derived from different sources; while the biphytanic diacids were mostly derived from methane-oxidizing euryarchea, the biphytanes were from mixed sources.

=== Case study: Late Archean sediments ===
In 2006, Ventura et al. measured solvent-extractable hydrocarbons with GC-MS from metasedimentary rocks sampled from the Tisdale and Porcupine Assemblage (2,707 to 2685 Ma) near Timmins, ON, Canada. From the extracted samples, the authors measured biphytane, cyclic biphytanes, and derivatives of biphytanes. Because post-Archaean deposition of the compounds could be ruled out given the reduced adsorptive capacity and restricted porosity of the sediments, the authors were able to conclude that the presence of biphytane, along with other molecular fossils, suggests the existence of archaea in the Late Archean sedimentary environments and in subsurface hydrothermal settings.
