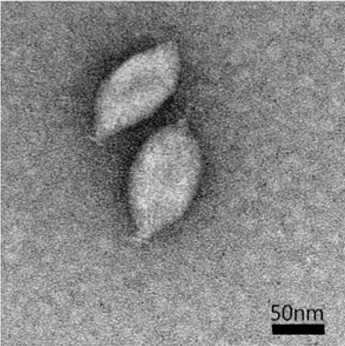
- TEM image of virions of Nitrosopumilus spindle-shaped virus 1.

Virus classification
- (unranked): Virus
- Family: Thaspiviridae
- Genus: Nitmarvirus

Species
- Nitmarvirus maris

Synonyms
- Nitmarvirus NSV1; Nitrosopumilus spindle-shaped virus 1 Virus name; NSV1 Virus name abbr.; MK57005: GenBank accession; NC_048199 REFSEQ accession

= Thaspiviridae =

Family of viruses

Thaspiviridae is a family of incertae sedis spindle-shaped viruses. The family contains a single genus, Nitmarvirus, which contains a single species, Nitrosopumilus spindle-shaped virus 1 (NSV1, Nitmarvirus maris).

Thaspiviridae are known to infect mesophilic ammonia-oxidizing archaea of the genus Nitrosopumilus.

== Structure ==
The virion is spindle-shaped, measuring 64±3 nm in diameter and 112±6 nm in length, with short fibres at one pole. Its morphology is very similar to that of the members of the families Fuselloviridae and Halspiviridae, which infect hyperthermophilic and hyperhalophilic archaea, respectively.

== Genome ==
Its genome is linear dsDNA of length 27–29 kbp, with 176 bp terminal inverted repeats. The virus genome is predicted to carry 48 genes. With the exception of protein-primed B DNA polymerase, which is also found in several groups of archaeal viruses and non-viral mobile genetic elements that also have linear genomes with terminal inverted repeats, the proteins encoded by Nitrosopumilus spindle-shaped virus 1 are unrelated to those of other archaeal and bacterial viruses.

== Replication ==
The virus is non-lytic (capable of exiting host cells without killing them), and chronic (can be demonstrated in the body at all times and the disease may be present or absent for an extended period of time). The virus genome is likely to be replicated by the virus-encoded protein-primed family B DNA polymerase, as has been inferred for other viruses. The virus also encodes a proliferating cell nuclear antigen which is also likely to be involved in viral genome replication.
