= Methanobrevibacter oralis =

Scientific classification
- Domain: Archaea
- Kingdom: Methanobacteriati
- Phylum: Methanobacteriota
- Class: Methanobacteria
- Order: Methanobacteriales
- Family: Methanobacteriaceae
- Genus: Methanobrevibacter
- Species: M. oralis

Binomial name
- Methanobrevibacter oralis Ferrari et al. 1995

Species of archaeon

Methanobrevibacter oralis is a methanogenic archaeon species considered to be a member of the human microbiota, mainly associated to the oral cavity. M. oralis is a coccobacillary shaped, single-cell, Gram-positive, non-motile microorganism of the Archaea domain of life. This species has been isolated and sequenced from humans in dental plaque and in their gastrointestinal tract. As a methanogen and a hydrogenotroph, this prokaryote can produce methane by using hydrogen and carbon dioxide as substrates through a process called methanogenesis.

== Discovery and comparisons to Methanobrevibacter smithii ==
Originally isolated in 1994 from human dental plaque, Methanobrevibacter oralis has been the third most common methanogenic archaea seen in the human body, preceded by Methanobrevibacter smithii and Methanosphaera stadtmanae. This species of archaea has not been described in other species. It has been seen in ancient human dental calculus, as well as in different studies of oral pathologies in different continents, from Europe, Asia, the Americas and Africa.

The first draft genomic sequence, however, came from a strain that came from stool. This species is highly phylogenetically related to M. smithii however it is not a distinct member of the human gut, instead it is most prevalent in the human oral cavity. Comparisons of their genomic sequences shows distinct gene differences between the two species that may provide some information on the niche distinction. Another difference that separates M. oralis from M. smithii is that it only utilizes hydrogen gas (H_{2}) and carbon dioxide (CO_{2}) for methanogenesis, while M. smithii uses those two substrates as well as formate.

== Implications in oral health and human microbiome ==
The major interest with M. oralis has been that it is associated with periodontal disease, with an increase in abundance seen of this archaea when compared to its abundance in healthy samples. Periodontitis is an infection caused by multiple, different anaerobic bacteria and it has been suggested that the increase of M. oralis contributes to this disease due to potential syntrophic interactions with the other members of this infection. These syntrophic interactions include supporting microbial fermentation by consuming the hydrogen from said process. Although not currently considered a pathogen for this disease, multiple studies are looking into understanding its relation to this disease through more cultivation-independent sample sets, evolutionary studies, and immunological responses.

Although focus has been on the oral microbiome, PCR-based and metagenomic sequencing studies have been seeing evidence of this species in human gut, brain abscess, in the respiratory tract, and appendicular abscesses. More studies need to be done to understand the implication of M. oralis in these niches.
