= Methanobrevibacter intestini =

Scientific classification
- Domain: Archaea
- Kingdom: Methanobacteriati
- Phylum: Methanobacteriota
- Class: Methanobacteria
- Order: Methanobacteriales
- Family: Methanobacteriaceae
- Genus: Methanobrevibacter
- Species: M. intestini

Binomial name
- Methanobrevibacter intestini Weinberger et al. 2025

Species of archaea

Methanobrevibacter intestini is a methanogenic, rod-shaped, non-flagellated archaeon found in the human gut microbiome.

== Phylogeny ==
Methanobrevibacter intestini is closely related to the species M. smithii, an archaeon of the same genus that thrives in the human gut. In fact, M. intestini was once considered a strain of M. smithii because its 16S ribosomal RNA (rRNA) gene was 99% identical to a reference strain of M. smithii. However, recent analysis of the Genome Taxonomy Database revealed that M. smithii contains two clades: "s__Methanobrevibacter_A smithii" and "s__Methanobrevibacter_A smithii_A". Using whole-genome analysis, researchers discovered key differences between these clades. s__Methanobrevibacter_A smithii_A contained a greater median genome size (1.9 million base pairs in comparison to 1.7 million base pairs) with an average nucleotide identity (ANI) of 93.95%. ANI is a metric used to determine the similarity between the nucleotide sequences of two whole genomes. Because the ANI falls under the modern microbial species cutoff of 95%, s__Methanobrevibacter_A smithii_A was reclassified as a wholly separate species called Methanobrevibacter intestini. This novel classification is further supported by a 3% nucleotide divergence in their mcrA gene. This gene encodes for methyl-coenzyme M reductase: an enzyme necessary for methanogenesis.

== Discovery ==
=== Original Isolation ===
Methanobrevibacter intestini was originally isolated from a human stool sample from Mayo Clinic. As described in their 2017 draft genome sequence announcement, Jennings et al. at the University of Illinois isolated and enriched the strain using hydrogen gas and carbon dioxide as a carbon and energy source. Upon analysis, it was found that the isolate exhibited autofluorescence when excited at 420 nm, which is a defining marker of cofactor F420. This cofactor is specific to methanogens, suggesting this strain is a methanogen, or an organism that produces methane. The researchers then extracted its DNA, used Illumina sequencing to produce reads, and then assembled those reads into scaffolds and ultimately a genome. At the time, it was thought to be a strain of M. smithii and referred to as strain WWM1085.

=== Official Classification ===
In 2021, Weinberger et al. at the Medical University of Graz, Austria purified this enriched culture using an antibiotic treatment consisting of streptomycin and penicillin. Both antibiotics were at a concentration of 10 mg/mL. After using multiple research methods, such as comparing its mcrA gene, completing full genome sequencing, and utilizing electron microscopy, they officially described WWM1085 as a novel species called M. intestini.

== Morphology ==
Methanobrevibacter intestini takes the shape of a coccobacillus, which is a short rod. This species presents as single, distinct cells that often assemble in pairs, short chains, or longer filaments.

== Metabolism ==
Methanobrevibacter intestini facilitates methanogenesis, which is the process of producing methane as a byproduct during ATP generation. The species accomplishes this by utilizing both hydrogen gas and carbon dioxide as energy sources. M. intestini also relies on the presence of acetate and yeast extract to support growth. Finally, the species utilizes key enzymes such as methyl-coenzyme M reductase. This enzyme, encoded by the mcrA gene, is found in all methanogenic archaea and is responsible for catalyzing the final step of methanogenesis. M. intestini can perform these essential metabolic functions across a wide range of pH and temperature conditions. In particular, these functions are best performed at a pH of 5.5 to 7.5 and a temperature range of around 35 to 39°C. Given that M. intestini is a strict anaerobe, it cannot undergo metabolism in the presence of oxygen.

== Genomics ==
In 2021, Chibani et al. gathered 1,167 unique archaeal genomes from the human gut by examining pre-existing databases of whole genome sequences, specifically metagenome-assembled genomes (MAGs) and isolate genomes. One of these genomes belonged to the clade s__Methanobrevibacter_A smithii_A, which researchers now know as M. intestini. Using this genomic information, researchers discovered that M. intestini contains approximately 1.9 million base pairs, with guanine and cytosine comprising 30.30 mol% of the genome. Because researchers were interested in determining the genetic differences between M. intestini and M. smithii, researchers analyzed parameters such as 16S rRNA, ANI, and mcrA. While the 16S rRNA gene remained highly similar between the two species, researchers reported a major difference of 3% in the mcrA gene sequence and an ANI value of 93.95%. The probability of these differences being significant was calculated using a program called JSpeciesWS.

== Ecology ==
This species lives in the human gut as a strict anaerobe, which means that it can only grow in the absence of oxygen. However, this archaeal anaerobe does not work alone as M. intestini partakes in syntrophic interactions with other gut bacteria. The most well-studied of these bacteria are Christensenella minuta and Bacteroides thetaiotaomicron, which interact with M. intestini by providing resources such as hydrogen and acetate. Although research has largely focused on these two bacterial microbes, it also suggests that other players, like Escherichia coli, are involved in these ecological interactions.

== Significance ==
=== Current understanding ===
This species is extremely common in humans, thought to be found in just over 90% of people. Despite how common it is, research has not focused as much on archaea in the human gut compared to their bacteria counterparts. This is largely due to how hard they are to study. Standard lab methods are designed for bacteria and not archaea, which have different physiological properties, and therefore current databases are limited. With this in mind, the discovery and full genome sequencing of M. intestini gets researchers closer to understanding its specific role in the human gastrointestinal system.

=== Future interventions ===
Currently, both M. smithii and M. intestini are understood to be methanogens. This is important because methane can be detected in the human breath and has been linked to reduced intestinal muscle movement and therefore linked to constipation-predominant irritable bowel syndrome. High methane levels can also indicate oxidative stress and potentially serve as a diagnostic tool. Conversely, methane could function as an antioxidant, protecting cells from damage and exhibiting anti-inflammatory effects. Because researchers are still unsure whether archaea in the gut can benefit or disrupt human health, being able to study a diverse range of archaea is essential to advancing public health. For instance, since methane production has been linked to common gastrointestinal disorders like irritable bowel syndrome, understanding methanogens like M. intestini can improve treatments in the future.
