= Methanobrevibacter wolinii =

Scientific classification
- Domain: Archaea
- Kingdom: Methanobacteriati
- Phylum: Methanobacteriota
- Class: Methanobacteria
- Order: Methanobacteriales
- Family: Methanobacteriaceae
- Genus: Methanobrevibacter
- Species: M. wolinii

Binomial name
- Methanobrevibacter wolinii Miller and Lin, 2002

Species of archaeon

Methanobrevibacter wolinii is a species of methanogen archaeon, named after Meyer J. Wolin.

== Description ==
Coccobacillus with slightly tapered ends, about t 0.6 micrometres in width and 1.0-1.4 micrometres in length, occurring in pairs or short chains. Gram-positive reaction. Its cell walls are composed of pseudomurein. It is a strict anaerobe and its type strain is SH^{T} (=DSM 11976^{T} =OCM 814^{T}). It was first isolated from sheep faeces.
