= Methanobrevibacter gottschalkii =

Scientific classification
- Domain: Archaea
- Kingdom: Methanobacteriati
- Phylum: Methanobacteriota
- Class: Methanobacteria
- Order: Methanobacteriales
- Family: Methanobacteriaceae
- Genus: Methanobrevibacter
- Species: M. gottschalkii

Binomial name
- Methanobrevibacter gottschalkii Miller and Lin, 2002

Species of archaeon

Methanobrevibacter gottschalkii is a species of methanogen archaeon, named after Gerhard Gottschalk.

== Description ==
It is a coccobacillus with rounded ends, about 0.7 micrometres in width and 0.9 micrometres in length, occurring in pairs or short chains. Gram-positive reaction. Its cell wall is composed of pseudomurein. It is a strict anaerobe and its type strain is HO^{T} (=DSM 11977^{T} =OCM 813^{T}). It was first isolated from horse and pig faeces.
