= Methanobrevibacter woesei =

Scientific classification
- Domain: Archaea
- Kingdom: Methanobacteriati
- Phylum: Methanobacteriota
- Class: Methanobacteria
- Order: Methanobacteriales
- Family: Methanobacteriaceae
- Genus: Methanobrevibacter
- Species: M. woesei

Binomial name
- Methanobrevibacter woesei Miller and Lin, 2002

Species of archaeon

Methanobrevibacter woesei is a species of methanogen archaeon, named after Carl R. Woese.

== Description ==
Coccobacillus with slightly tapered ends, about 0.6 micrometres in width and 1 micrometre in length, occurring in pairs or short chains. Gram-positive reaction. Its cell walls are composed of pseudomurein. It is a strict anaerobe and its type strain is GS^{T}(=DSM 11979^{T} =OCM 815^{T}). It was first isolated from goose faeces.
