= Methanobrevibacter thaueri =

Scientific classification
- Domain: Archaea
- Kingdom: Methanobacteriati
- Phylum: Methanobacteriota
- Class: Methanobacteria
- Order: Methanobacteriales
- Family: Methanobacteriaceae
- Genus: Methanobrevibacter
- Species: M. thaueri

Binomial name
- Methanobrevibacter thaueri Miller and Lin, 2002

Species of archaeon

Methanobrevibacter thaueri is a species of methanogen archaeon, named after Rolf K. Thauer.

== Description ==
Coccobacillus with slightly tapered ends, about 0.5 micrometres in width and 0.6-1.2 micrometres in length, occurring in pairs or short chains. Gram-positive reaction. Its cell walls are composed of pseudomurein. It is a strict anaerobe and its type strain is CW^{T} (=DSM 11995^{T} =OCM 817^{T}). It was first isolated from cow faeces.
