= Methanobrevibacter curvatus =

Scientific classification
- Domain: Archaea
- Kingdom: Methanobacteriati
- Phylum: Methanobacteriota
- Class: Methanobacteria
- Order: Methanobacteriales
- Family: Methanobacteriaceae
- Genus: Methanobrevibacter
- Species: M. curvatus

Binomial name
- Methanobrevibacter curvatus Leadbetter and Breznak 1997

Species of archaeon

Methanoflexus curvatus (formerly Methanobrevibacter curvatus) is a species of methanogen archaeon. It was first isolated from the hindgut of the termite Reticulitermes flavipes. It is rod-shaped, ranging in size from 0.34 to 1.6 μm and possesses polar fibers. Its morphology, gram-positive staining reaction, resistance to cell lysis by chemical agents and narrow range of utilisable substrates are typical of species belonging to the family Methanobrevibacteraceae.

It habitates on or near the hindgut epithelium and also attached to filamentous prokaryotes associated with the gut wall. It is one of the predominant gut biota.
