= Methanogen =

Type of microorganism that produces methane as a waste product

Methanogens are anaerobic archaea that produce methane as a byproduct of their energy metabolism, i.e., catabolism. Methane production, or methanogenesis, is the only biochemical pathway for ATP generation in methanogens. All known methanogens belong exclusively to the domain Archaea, although some bacteria, plants, and animal cells are also known to produce methane. However, the biochemical pathway for methane production in these organisms differs from that in methanogens and does not contribute to ATP formation. Methanogens belong to various phyla within the domain Archaea. Previous studies placed all known methanogens into the superphylum Euryarchaeota. However, recent phylogenomic data have led to their reclassification into several different phyla. Methanogens are common in various anoxic environments, such as marine and freshwater sediments, wetlands, the digestive tracts of animals, wastewater treatment plants, rice paddy soil, and landfills. While some methanogens are extremophiles, such as Methanopyrus kandleri, which grows between 84 and 110 °C (183 and 230 °F), or Methanonatronarchaeum thermophilum, which grows at a pH range of 8.2 to 10.2 and a Na^{+} concentration of 3 to 4.8 M, most of the isolates are mesophilic and grow around neutral pH.

== Physical description ==
Methanogens are usually cocci (spherical) or rods (cylindrical) in shape, but long filaments (Methanobrevibacter filiformis, Methanospirillum hungatei) and curved forms (Methanobrevibacter curvatus, Methanobrevibacter cuticularis) also occur. There are over 150 described species of methanogens, which do not form a monophyletic group in the domain Archaea (see Taxonomy). They are exclusively anaerobic organisms that cannot function under aerobic conditions due to the extreme oxygen sensitivity of methanogenesis enzymes and FeS clusters involved in ATP production. However, the degree of oxygen sensitivity varies, as methanogenesis has often been detected in temporarily oxygenated environments such as rice paddy soil, and various molecular mechanisms potentially involved in oxygen and reactive oxygen species (ROS) detoxification have been proposed. For instance, a recently identified species Candidatus Methanothrix paradoxum common in wetlands and soil can function in anoxic microsites within aerobic environments but it is sensitive to the presence of oxygen even at trace level and cannot usually sustain oxygen stress for a prolonged time. However, Methanosarcina barkeri from a sister family Methanosarcinaceae is exceptional in possessing a superoxide dismutase (SOD) enzyme, and may survive longer than the others in the presence of O_{2}.

As is the case for other archaea, methanogens lack peptidoglycan, a polymer that is found in the cell walls of bacteria. Instead, some methanogens have a cell wall formed by pseudopeptidoglycan (also known as pseudomurein). However, most of methanogens have a paracrystalline protein array (S-layer) that fits together like a jigsaw puzzle. In some lineages there are less common types of cell envelope such as the proteinaceous sheath of Methanospirillum or the methanochondroitin of Methanosarcina aggregated cells.

== Ecology ==
In anaerobic environments, methanogens play a vital ecological role, removing excess hydrogen and fermentation products that have been produced by other forms of anaerobic respiration. Methanogens typically thrive in environments in which all electron acceptors other than CO_{2} (such as oxygen, nitrate, ferric iron (Fe(III)), and sulfate) have been depleted. Such environments include wetlands and rice paddy soil, the digestive tracts of various animals (ruminants, arthropods, humans), wastewater treatment plants and landfills, deep-water oceanic sediments, and hydrothermal vents. Most of these environments are not categorized as extreme, and thus the methanogens inhabiting them are also not considered extremophiles. However, many well-studied methanogens are thermophiles such as Methanopyrus kandleri, Methanothermobacter marburgensis, Methanocaldococcus jannaschii. On the other hand, gut methanogens such as Methanobrevibacter smithii common in humans or Methanobrevibacter ruminantium omnipresent in ruminants are mesophiles.

=== Methanogens in extreme environments ===
In deep basaltic rocks near the mid-ocean ridges, methanogens can obtain their hydrogen from the serpentinization reaction of olivine as observed in the hydrothermal field of Lost City. The thermal breakdown of water and water radiolysis are other possible sources of hydrogen. Methanogens are key agents of remineralization of organic carbon in continental margin sediments and other aquatic sediments with high rates of sedimentation and high sediment organic matter. Under the correct conditions of pressure and temperature, biogenic methane can accumulate in massive deposits of methane clathrates that account for a significant fraction of organic carbon in continental margin sediments and represent a key reservoir of a potent greenhouse gas.

Methanogens have been found in several extreme environments on Earth – buried under kilometres of ice in Greenland and living in hot, dry desert soil. They are known to be the most common archaea in deep subterranean habitats. Live microbes making methane were found in a glacial ice core sample retrieved from about three kilometres under Greenland by researchers from the University of California, Berkeley. They also found a constant metabolism able to repair macromolecular damage, at temperatures of 145 to –40 °C.

Another study has also discovered methanogens in a harsh environment on Earth. Researchers studied dozens of soil and vapour samples from five different desert environments in Utah, Idaho and California in the United States, and in Canada and Chile. Of these, five soil samples and three vapour samples from the vicinity of the Mars Desert Research Station in Utah were found to have signs of viable methanogens.

Some scientists have proposed that the presence of methane in the Martian atmosphere may be indicative of native methanogens on that planet. In June 2019, NASA's Curiosity rover detected methane, commonly generated by underground microbes such as methanogens, which signals possibility of life on Mars.

Closely related to the methanogens are the anaerobic methane oxidizers, which utilize methane as a substrate in conjunction with the reduction of sulfate and nitrate. Most methanogens are autotrophic producers, but those that oxidize CH_{3}COO^{−} are classed as heterotrophs instead.

=== Methanogens in the digestive tract of animals ===
The digestive tract of animals is characterized by a nutrient-rich and predominantly anaerobic environment, making it an ideal habitat for many microbes, including methanogens. Despite this, methanogens and archaea, in general, were largely overlooked as part of the gut microbiota until recently. However, they play a crucial role in maintaining gut balance by utilizing end products of bacterial fermentation, such as H_{2}, acetate, methanol, and methylamines.

Methanobrevibacter smithii is the predominant methanogenic archaeon in the microbiota of the human gut. Recent extensive surveys of archaea presence in the animal gut, based on 16S rRNA analysis, have provided a comprehensive view of archaea diversity and abundance. These studies revealed that only a few archaeal lineages are present, with the majority being methanogens, while non-methanogenic archaea are rare and not abundant. Taxonomic classification of archaeal diversity identified that representatives of only three phyla are present in the digestive tracts of animals: Methanobacteriota (order Methanobacteriales), Thermoplasmatota (order Methanomassiliicoccales), and Halobacteriota (orders Methanomicrobiales and Methanosarcinales). However, not all families and genera within these orders were detected in animal guts, but only a few genera, suggesting their specific adaptations to the gut environment.

== Comparative genomics and molecular signatures ==
Comparative proteomic analysis has led to the identification of 31 signature proteins which are specific for methanogens (also known as Methanoarchaeota). Most of these proteins are related to methanogenesis, and they could serve as potential molecular markers for methanogens. Additionally, 10 proteins found in all methanogens, which are shared by Archaeoglobus, suggest that these two groups are related. In phylogenetic trees, methanogens are not monophyletic and they are generally split into three clades. Hence, the unique shared presence of large numbers of proteins by all methanogens could be due to lateral gene transfers. Additionally, more recent novel proteins associated with sulfide trafficking have been linked to methanogen archaea. More proteomic analysis is needed to further differentiate specific genera within the methanogen class and reveal novel pathways for methanogenic metabolism.

Modern DNA or RNA sequencing approaches has elucidated several genomic markers specific to several groups of methanogens. One such finding isolated nine methanogens from genus Methanoculleus and found that there were at least 2 trehalose synthases genes that were found in all nine genomes. Thus far, the gene has been observed only in this genus, therefore it can be used as a marker to identify the archaea Methanoculleus. As sequencing techniques progress and databases become populated with an abundance of genomic data, a greater number of strains and traits can be identified, but many genera have remained understudied. For example, halophilic methanogens are potentially important microbes for carbon cycling in coastal wetland ecosystems but seem to be greatly understudied. One recent publication isolated a novel strain from genus Methanohalophilus which resides in sulfide-rich seawater. Interestingly, they have isolated several portions of this strain's genome that are different from other isolated strains of this genus (Methanohalophilus mahii, Methanohalophilus halophilus, Methanohalophilus portucalensis, Methanohalophilus euhalbius). Some differences include a highly conserved genome, sulfur and glycogen metabolisms and viral resistance. Genomic markers consistent with the microbes environment have been observed in many other cases. One such study found that methane producing archaea found in hydraulic fracturing zones had genomes which varied with vertical depth. Subsurface and surface genomes varied along with the constraints found in individual depth zones, though fine-scale diversity was also found in this study. Genomic markers pointing at environmentally relevant factors are often non-exclusive. A survey of Methanogenic Thermoplasmata has found these organisms in human and animal intestinal tracts. This novel species was also found in other methanogenic environments such as wetland soils, though the group isolated in the wetlands did tend to have a larger number of genes encoding for anti-oxidation enzymes that were not present in the same group isolated in the human and animal intestinal tract. A common issue with identifying and discovering novel species of methanogens is that sometimes the genomic differences can be quite small, yet the research group decides they are different enough to separate into individual species. One study took a group of Methanocellales and ran a comparative genomic study. The three strains were originally considered identical, but a detailed approach to genomic isolation showed differences among their previously considered identical genomes. Differences were seen in gene copy number and there was also metabolic diversity associated with the genomic information.

Genomic signatures not only allow one to mark unique methanogens and genes relevant to environmental conditions; it has also led to a better understanding of the evolution of these archaea. Some methanogens must actively mitigate against oxic environments. Functional genes involved with the production of antioxidants have been found in methanogens, and some specific groups tend to have an enrichment of this genomic feature. Methanogens containing a genome with enriched antioxidant properties may provide evidence that this genomic addition may have occurred during the Great Oxygenation Event. In another study, three strains from the lineage Thermoplasmatales isolated from animal gastro-intestinal tracts revealed evolutionary differences. The eukaryotic-like histone gene which is present in most methanogen genomes was not present, alluding to evidence that an ancestral branch was lost within Thermoplasmatales and related lineages. Furthermore, the group Methanomassiliicoccus has a genome which appears to have lost many common genes coding for the first several steps of methanogenesis. These genes appear to have been replaced by genes coding for a novel methylated methogenic pathway. This pathway has been reported in several types of environments, pointing to non-environment specific evolution, and may point to an ancestral deviation.

== Metabolism ==
=== Methane production ===
Methanogens are known to produce methane from substrates such as H_{2}/CO_{2}, acetate, formate, methanol and methylamines in a process called methanogenesis. Different methanogenic reactions are catalyzed by unique sets of enzymes and coenzymes. While reaction mechanism and energetics vary between one reaction and another, all of these reactions contribute to net positive energy production by creating ion concentration gradients that are used to drive ATP synthesis. The overall reaction for H_{2}/CO_{2} methanogenesis is:

$\ce{CO2 + 4 H2 -> CH4 + 2 H2O}$ (∆G˚' = -134 kJ/mol CH_{4})

Well-studied organisms that produce methane via H_{2}/CO_{2} methanogenesis include Methanosarcina barkeri, Methanobacterium thermoautotrophicum, and Methanobacterium wolfei. These organisms are typically found in anaerobic environments.

In the earliest stage of H_{2}/CO_{2} methanogenesis, CO_{2} binds to methanofuran (MF) and is reduced to formyl-MF. This endergonic reductive process (∆G˚'= +16 kJ/mol) is dependent on the availability of H_{2} and is catalyzed by the enzyme formyl-MF dehydrogenase.

$$\ce{CO2 + H2 + MF -> HCO-MF + H2O}$$

The formyl constituent of formyl-MF is then transferred to the coenzyme tetrahydromethanopterin (H4MPT) and is catalyzed by a soluble enzyme known as formyltransferase. This results in the formation of formyl-H4MPT.

$$\ce{HCO-MF + H4MPT -> HCO-H4MPT + MF}$$

Formyl-H4MPT is subsequently reduced to methenyl-H4MPT. Methenyl-H4MPT then undergoes a one-step hydrolysis followed by a two-step reduction to methyl-H4MPT. The two-step reversible reduction is assisted by coenzyme F_{420} whose hydride acceptor spontaneously oxidizes. Once oxidized, F_{420}'s electron supply is replenished by accepting electrons from H_{2}. This step is catalyzed by methylene H4MPT dehydrogenase.

$\ce{HCO-H4MPT + H+ -> CH-H4MPT+ + H2O}$ (Formyl-H4MPT reduction)

$\ce{CH-H4MPT+ + F420H2 -> CH2=H4MPT + F420 + H+}$(Methenyl-H4MPT hydrolysis)

$\ce{CH2=H4MPT + H2 -> CH3-H4MPT + H+}$(H4MPT reduction)

Next, the methyl group of methyl-M4MPT is transferred to coenzyme M via a methyltransferase-catalyzed reaction.

$$\ce{CH3-H4MPT + HS-CoM -> CH3-S-CoM + H4MPT}$$

The final step of H_{2}/CO_{2} methanogenesis involves methyl-coenzyme M reductase and two coenzymes: N-7 mercaptoheptanoylthreonine phosphate (HS-HTP) and coenzyme F_{430}. HS-HTP donates electrons to methyl-coenzyme M allowing the formation of methane and mixed disulfide of HS-CoM. F_{430}, on the other hand, serves as a prosthetic group to the reductase. H_{2} donates electrons to the mixed disulfide of HS-CoM and regenerates coenzyme M.

$\ce{CH3-S-CoM + HS-HTP -> CH4 + CoM-S-S-HTP}$ (Formation of methane)

$\ce{CoM-S-S-HTP + H2 -> HS-CoM + HS-HTP}$ (Regeneration of coenzyme M)

== Biotechnological application ==
=== Wastewater treatment ===
Methanogens are widely used in anaerobic digestors to treat wastewater as well as aqueous organic pollutants. Industries have selected methanogens for their ability to perform biomethanation during wastewater decomposition thereby rendering the process sustainable and cost-effective.

Bio-decomposition in the anaerobic digester involves a four-staged cooperative action performed by different microorganisms. The first stage is the hydrolysis of insoluble polymerized organic matter by anaerobes such as Streptococcus and Enterobacterium. In the second stage, acidogens break down dissolved organic pollutants in wastewater to fatty acids. In the third stage, acetogens convert fatty acids to acetates. In the final stage, methanogens metabolize acetates to gaseous methane. The byproduct methane leaves the aqueous layer and serves as an energy source to power wastewater-processing within the digestor, thus generating a self-sustaining mechanism.

Methanogens also effectively decrease the concentration of organic matter in wastewater run-off. For instance, agricultural wastewater, highly rich in organic material, has been a major cause of aquatic ecosystem degradation. The chemical imbalances can lead to severe ramifications such as eutrophication. Through anaerobic digestion, the purification of wastewater can prevent unexpected blooms in water systems as well as trap methanogenesis within digesters. This allocates biomethane for energy production and prevents a potent greenhouse gas, methane, from being released into the atmosphere.

The organic components of wastewater vary vastly. Chemical structures of the organic matter select for specific methanogens to perform anaerobic digestion. An example is the members of Methanosaeta genus dominate the digestion of palm oil mill effluent (POME) and brewery waste. Modernizing wastewater treatment systems to incorporate higher diversity of microorganisms to decrease organic content in treatment is under active research in the field of microbiological and chemical engineering. Current new generations of Staged Multi-Phase Anaerobic reactors and Upflow Sludge Bed reactor systems are designed to have innovated features to counter high loading wastewater input, extreme temperature conditions, and possible inhibitory compounds.

== Taxonomy ==
Initially, methanogens were considered to be bacteria, as it was not possible to distinguish archaea and bacteria before the introduction of molecular techniques such as DNA sequencing and PCR. Since the introduction of the domain Archaea by Carl Woese in 1977, methanogens were for a prolonged period considered a monophyletic group, later named Euryarchaeota (super)phylum. However, intensive studies of various environments have proved that there are more and more non-methanogenic lineages among methanogenic ones.

The development of genome sequencing directly from environmental samples (metagenomics) allowed the discovery of the first methanogens outside the Euryarchaeota superphylum. The first such putative methanogenic lineage was Bathyarchaeia, a class within the Thermoproteota phylum. Later, it was shown that this lineage is not methanogenic but alkane-oxidizing utilizing highly divergent enzyme Acr similar to the hallmark gene of methanogenesis, methyl-CoM reductase (McrABG). The first isolate of Bathyarchaeum tardum from sediment of coastal lake in Russia showed that it metabolizes aromatic compounds and proteins as it was previously predicted based on metagenomic studies. However, more new putative methanogens outside of Euryarchaeota were discovered based on the presence McrABG.

For instance, methanogens were found in the phyla Thermoproteota (orders Methanomethyliales, Korarchaeales, Methanohydrogenales, Nezhaarchaeales) and Methanobacteriota_B (order Methanofastidiosales). Additionally, some new lineages of methanogens were isolated in pure culture, which allowed the discovery of a new type of methanogenesis: H_{2}-dependent methyl-reducing methanogenesis, which is independent of the Wood-Ljungdahl pathway. For example, in 2012, the order Methanoplasmatales from the phylum Thermoplasmatota was described as a seventh order of methanogens. Later, the order was renamed Methanomassiliicoccales based on the isolated from human gut Methanomassiliicoccus luminyensis. The first isolate from Thermoproteota phylum was obtained in 2024 and species description was published in 2025.

Another new lineage in the Halobacteriota phylum, order Methanonatronarchaeales, was discovered in alkaline saline lakes in Siberia in 2017. It also employs H_{2}-dependent methyl-reducing methanogenesis but intriguingly harbors almost the full Wood-Ljungdahl pathway. However, it is disconnected from McrABG as no MtrA-H complex was detected.

The taxonomy of methanogens reflects the evolution of these archaea, with some studies suggesting that the Last Archaeal Common Ancestor was methanogenic. If correct, this suggests that many archaeal lineages lost the ability to produce methane and switched to other types of metabolism. Currently, most of the isolated methanogens belong to one of three archaeal phyla (classification GTDB release 220): Halobacteriota, Methanobacteriota, and Thermoplasmatota. Under the International Code of Nomenclature for Prokaryotes, all three phyla belong to the same kingdom, Methanobacteriati. In total, more than 150 methanogen species are known in culture, with some represented by more than one strain.

- Phylum Halobacteriota
  - Class Methanocellia
    - Order Methanocellales
      - Family Methanocellaceae
        - Genus Methanocella Sakai et al. 2008
          - Methanocella paludicola Sakai et al. 2008 (type species)
          - Methanocella arvoryzae Sakai et al. 2010
          - Methanocella conradii Lü and Lu 2012
        - Genus Methanooceanicella Zhang et al. 2024
          - Methanooceanicella nereidis Zhang et al. 2024 (type species)
  - Class Methanomicrobia
    - Order Methanomicrobiales
      - Family Methanocalculaceae Zhilina et al. 2014
        - Genus Methanocalculus Ollivier et al. 1998
          - Methanocalculus halotolerans Ollivier et al. 1998 (type species)
          - Methanocalculus alkaliphilus Sorokin et al. 2015
          - Methanocalculus chunghsingensis Lai et al. 2004
          - Methanocalculus natronophilus Zhilina et al. 2014
          - Methanocalculus pumilus Mori et al. 2000
          - Methanocalculus taiwanensis Lai et al. 2002
      - Family Methanocorpusculaceae Zellner et al. 1989
        - Methanocorpusculum Zellner et al. 1988
          - Methanocorpusculum parvum Zellner et al. 1988 (type species)
          - Methanocorpusculum bavaricum Zellner et al. 1989
          - Methanocorpusculum labreanum
          - Methanocorpusculum sinense Zellner et al. 1989
      - Family Methanomicrobiaceae Balch and Wolfe 1981
        - Genus Methanomicrobium Balch and Wolfe 1981
          - Methanomicrobium mobile (Paynter and Hungate 1968) Balch and Wolfe 1981 (type species)
          - Methanomicrobium antiquum Mochimaru et al. 2016
        - Genus Methanoculleus Maestrojuán et al. 1990
          - Methanoculleus bourgensis corrig. (Ollivier et al. 1986) Maestrojuán et al. 1990 (type species)
          - Methanoculleus chikugoensis Dianou et al. 2001
          - Methanoculleus horonobensis Shimizu et al. 2013
          - Methanoculleus hydrogenitrophicus Tian et al. 2010
          - Methanoculleus marisnigri
          - Methanoculleus palmolei Zellner et al. 1998
          - Methanoculleus receptaculi Cheng et al. 2008
          - Methanoculleus sediminis Chen et al. 2015
          - Methanoculleus submarinus Mikucki et al. 2003
          - Methanoculleus taiwanensis Weng et al. 2015
          - Methanoculleus thermophilus corrig. (Rivard and Smith 1982) Maestrojuán et al. 1990
        - Genus Methanogenium Romesser et al. 1981
          - Methanogenium cariaci Romesser et al. 1981 (type species)
          - Methanogenium frigidum
          - Methanogenium marinum Chong et al. 2003
          - Methanogenium organophilum
        - Genus Methanofollis Zellner et al. 1999
          - Methanofollis tationis (Zabel et al. 1986) Zellner et al. 1999 (type strains)
          - Methanofollis aquaemaris Lai and Chen 2001
          - Methanofollis ethanolicus Imachi et al. 2009
          - Methanofollis fontis Chen et al. 2020
          - Methanofollis formosanus Wu et al. 2005
          - Methanofollis liminatans (Zellner et al. 1990) Zellner et al. 1999
      - Family Methanoregulaceae Sakai et al. 2012
        - Genus Methanoregula Bräuer et al. 2011
          - Methanoregula boonei Bräuer et al. 2011 (type species)
          - Methanoregula formicica Yashiro et al. 2011
      - Family Methanospirillaceae Boone et al. 2002
        - Methanospirillum Ferry et al. 1974
          - Methanospirillum hungatei corrig. Ferry et al. 1974 (type species)
          - Methanospirillum lacunae Iino et al. 2010
          - Methanospirillum psychrodurum Zhou et al. 2014
          - Methanospirillum stamsii Parshina et al. 2014
  - Class Methanonatronarchaeia
    - Order Methanonatronarchaeales
      - Family Methanonatronarchaeaceae Sorokin et al. 2018
        - GenusMethanonatronarchaeum Sorokin et al. 2018
          - Methanonatronarchaeum thermophilum Sorokin et al. 2018 (type species)
  - Class Methanosarcinia
    - Order Methanosarcinales
      - Family Methanosarcinaceae
        - Genus Methanosarcina Kluyver and van Niel 1936
          - Methanosarcina barkeri Schnellen 1947 (type species)
          - Methanosarcina acetivorans
          - Methanosarcina baltica von Klein et al. 2002
          - Methanosarcina flavescens Kern et al. 2016
          - Methanosarcina horonobensis Shimizu et al. 2011
          - Methanosarcina lacustris Simankova et al. 2002
          - Methanosarcina mazei (Barker 1936) Mah and Kuhn 1984
          - Methanosarcina semesiae Lyimo et al. 2000
          - Methanosarcina siciliae (Stetter and König 1989) Ni et al. 1994
          - Methanosarcina soligelidi Wagner et al. 2013
          - Methanosarcina spelaei Ganzert et al. 2014
          - Methanosarcina subterranea Shimizu et al. 2015
          - Methanosarcina thermophila Zinder et al. 1985
          - Methanosarcina vacuolata Zhilina and Zavarzin 1987
        - Genus Methanimicrococcus corrig. Sprenger et al. 2000
          - Methanimicrococcus blatticola corrig. Sprenger et al. 2000 (type species)
          - Methanimicrococcus hacksteinii Protasov and Brune 2025
          - Methanimicrococcus hongohii Protasov and Brune 2025
          - Methanimicrococcus stummii Protasov and Brune 2025
        - Genus Methanococcoides Sowers and Ferry 1985
          - Methanococcoides methylutens Sowers and Ferry 1985 (type species)
          - Methanococcoides alaskense Singh et al. 2005
          - Methanococcoides burtonii Franzmann et al. 1993
          - Methanococcoides orientis Liang et al. 2022
          - Methanococcoides vulcani L'Haridon et al. 2014
        - Genus Methanohalobium Zhilina and Zavarzin 1988
          - Methanohalobium evestigatum corrig. Zhilina and Zavarzin 1988 (type species)
        - Genus Methanohalophilus Paterek and Smith 1988
          - Methanohalophilus mahii Paterek and Smith 1988 (type species)
          - Methanohalophilus halophilus (Zhilina 1984) Wilharm et al. 1991
          - Methanohalophilus levihalophilus Katayama et al. 2014
          - Methanohalophilus portucalensis Boone et al. 1993
          - Methanohalophilus profundi L'Haridon et al. 2021
        - Genus Methanolapillus Protasov and Brune 2025
          - Methanolapillus millepedarum Protasov and Brune 2025 (type species)
          - Methanolapillus africanus Protasov and Brune 2025
          - Methanolapillus ohkumae Protasov and Brune 2025
        - Genus Methanolobus König and Stetter 1983
          - Methanolobus tindarius König and Stetter 1983 (type species)
          - Methanolobus bombayensis Kadam et al. 1994
          - Methanolobus chelungpuianus Wu and Lai 2015
          - Methanolobus halotolerans Shen et al. 2020
          - Methanolobus mangrovi Zhou et al. 2023
          - Methanolobus oregonensis (Liu et al. 1990) Boone 2002
          - Methanolobus profundi Mochimaru et al. 2009
          - Methanolobus psychrotolerans Chen et al. 2018
          - Methanolobus sediminis Zhou et al. 2023
          - Methanolobus taylorii Oremland and Boone 1994
          - Methanolobus vulcani Stetter et al. 1989
          - Methanolobus zinderi Doerfert et al. 2009
        - Genus Methanomethylovorans Lomans et al. 2004
          - Methanomethylovorans hollandica Lomans et al. 2004 (type species)
          - Methanomethylovorans thermophila Jiang et al. 2005
          - Methanomethylovorans uponensis Cha et al. 2014
        - Genus Methanosalsum Boone and Baker 2002
          - Methanosalsum zhilinae (Mathrani et al. 1988) Boone and Baker 2002 (type species)
          - Methanosalsum natronophilum Sorokin et al. 2015
      - Family Methanotrichaceae
        - Genus Methanothrix Huser et al. 1983
          - Methanothrix soehngenii Huser et al. 1983 (type species)
          - Methanothrix harundinacea (Ma et al. 2006) Akinyemi et al. 2021
          - Methanothrix thermoacetophila corrig. Nozhevnikova and Chudina 1988
          - "Candidatus Methanothrix paradoxa" corrig. Angle et al. 2017
      - Family Methermicoccaceae
        - Genus Methermicoccus Cheng et al. 2007
          - Methermicoccus shengliensis Cheng et al. 2007 (type species)
- Phylum Methanobacteriota
  - Class Methanobacteria
    - Order Methanobacteriales
      - Family Methanobacteriaceae
        - Genus Methanobacterium Kluyver and van Niel 1936
          - Methanobacterium formicicum Schnellen 1947 (type species)
          - Methanobacterium aarhusense Shlimon et al. 2004
          - Methanobacterium aggregans Kern et al. 2015
          - Methanobacterium alcaliphilum Worakit et al. 1986
          - Methanobacterium alkalithermotolerans Mei et al. 2022
          - Methanobacterium arcticum Shcherbakova et al. 2011
          - Methanobacterium aridiramus Lee et al. 2025
          - Methanobacterium beijingense Ma et al. 2005
          - Methanobacterium bryantii Balch and Wolfe 1981
          - Methanobacterium cahuitense Dengler et al. 2026
          - Methanobacterium congolense Cuzin et al. 2001
          - Methanobacterium espanolae Patel et al. 1990
          - Methanobacterium ferruginis Mori and Harayama 2011
          - Methanobacterium flexile Zhu et al. 2011
          - Methanobacterium ivanovii Jain et al. 1988
          - Methanobacterium kanagiense Kitamura et al. 2011
          - Methanobacterium lacus Borrel et al. 2012
          - Methanobacterium movens Zhu et al. 2011
          - Methanobacterium movilense Schirmack et al. 2014
          - Methanobacterium nebraskense Fiore et al. 2026
          - Methanobacterium oryzae Joulian et al. 2000
          - Methanobacterium paludis Cadillo-Quiroz et al. 2014
          - Methanobacterium palustre Zellner et al. 1990
          - Methanobacterium petrolearium Mori and Harayama 2011
          - Methanobacterium spitsbergense Trubitsyn et al. 2024
          - Methanobacterium subterraneum Kotelnikova et al. 1998
          - Methanobacterium thermaggregans corrig. Blotevogel and Fischer 1988
          - Methanobacterium uliginosum König 1985
          - Methanobacterium veterum Krivushin et al. 2010
        - Genus Methanosphaera Miller and Wolin 1985
          - Methanosphaera stadtmanae corrig. Miller and Wolin 1985 (type species)
          - Methanosphaera cuniculi Biavati et al. 1990
        - Family Methanobrevibacteraceae
          - Genus Methanobrevibacter Balch and Wolfe 1981
            - Methanobrevibacter ruminantium (Smith and Hungate 1958) Balch and Wolfe 1981 (type species)
            - Methanobrevibacter olleyae Rea et al. 2007
          - Genus Methanacia Protasov and Brune 2026
            - Methanacia filiformis (Leadbetter et al. 1998) Protasov and Brune comb. nov. (type species)
          - Genus Methanarmilla Protasov and Brune 2026
            - Methanarmilla wolinii (Miller and Lin 2002) Protasov and Brune comb.nov. (type species)
            - Methanarmilla boviskoreani (Lee et al. 2013) Protasov and Brune comb.nov.
          - Genus Methanobaculum Protasov and Brune 2026
            - Methanobaculum cuticulare (Leadbetter and Breznak 1997) Protasov and Brune comb.nov. (type species)
          - Genus Methanobinarius Protasov and Brune 2026
            - Methanobinarius arboriphilus corrig. (Zeikus and Henning 1975) Protasov and Brune comb. nov. (type species)
          - Genus Methanobotrus Protasov and Brune 2026
            - Methanobotrus acididurans (Savant et al. 2002) Protasov and Brune comb. nov. (type species)
          - Genus Methanocatella Protasov and Brune 2026
            - Methanocatella smithii (Balch and Wolfe 1981) Protasov and Brune comb. nov. (type species)
            - Methanocatella intestini (Weinberger et al. 2025) Protasov and Brune comb. nov.
            - Methanocatella gottschalkii (Miller and Lin 2002) Protasov and Brune comb. nov.
            - Methanocatella millerae (Rea et al. 2007) Protasov and Brune comb. nov.
            - Methanocatella oralis (Ferrari et al. 1995) Protasov and Brune comb. nov.
            - Methanocatella thaueri (Miller and Lin 2002) Protasov and Brune comb. nov.
            - Methanocatella woesei (Miller and Lin 2002) Protasov and Brune comb. nov.
            - Methanocatella massiliense Huynh et al. 2015
          - Genus Methanobaculum Protasov and Brune 2026
            - Methanoflexus curvatus (Leadbetter and Breznak 1997) Protasov and Brune comb. nov.
          - Genus Methanomonile Protasov and Brune 2026
            - Methanomonile shimae Protasov and Brune sp. nov. (type species)
        - Genus Methanothermobacter Wasserfallen et al. 2000
          - Methanothermobacter thermautotrophicus corrig. (Zeikus and Wolfe 1972) Wasserfallen et al. 2000 (type species)
          - Methanothermobacter crinale Cheng et al. 2012
          - Methanothermobacter defluvii (Kotelnikova et al. 1994) Boone 2002
          - Methanothermobacter marburgensis Wasserfallen et al. 2000
          - Methanothermobacter tenebrarum Nakamura et al. 2013
          - Methanothermobacter thermoflexus (Kotelnikova et al. 1994) Boone 2002
          - Methanothermobacter thermophilus (Laurinavichus et al. 1990) Boone 2002
          - Methanothermobacter wolfei corrig. (Winter et al. 1985) Wasserfallen et al. 2000
      - Family Methanothermobaculaceae
        - Genus Methanothermobaculum Protasov and Brune 2026
          - Methanothermobaculum tenebrarum (Nakamura et al. 2013) Protasov and Brune comb. nov.
      - Family Methanothermaceae
        - Genus Methanothermus Stetter 1982
          - Methanothermus fervidus Stetter 1982 (type species)
  - Class Methanopyri
    - Order Methanopyrales
      - Family Methanopyraceae
        - Genus Methanopyrus Kurr et al. 1992
          - Methanopyrus kandleri Kurr et al. 1992 (type species)
  - Class Methanococci
    - Order Methanococcales
      - Family Methanococcaceae Balch and Wolfe 1981
        - Genus Methanococcus Kluyver and van Niel 1936
          - Methanococcus vannielii Stadtman and Barker 1951 (type species)
          - Methanococcus aeolicus
          - Methanococcus burtonii
          - Methanococcus chunghsingensis
          - Methanococcus deltae
          - Methanococcus jannaschii
          - Methanococcus maripaludis
        - Genus Methanofervidicoccus
          - Methanofervidicoccus abyssi Sakai et al. 2019 (type species)
        - Genus Methanothermococcus
          - Methanothermococcus thermolithotrophicus (Huber et al. 1984) Whitman 2002 (type species)
      - Family Methanocaldococcaceae
        - Genus Methanocaldococcus
          - Methanocaldococcus jannaschii (Jones et al. 1984) Whitman 2002 (type species)
        - Genus Methanotorris
          - Methanotorris igneus (Burggraf et al. 1990) Whitman 2002 (type species)
- Phylum Thermoplasmatota
  - Class Thermoplasmata
    - Order Methanomassiliicoccales
      - Family Methanomassiliicoccaceae
        - Genus Methanomassiliicoccus Dridi et al. 2012
          - Methanomassiliicoccus luminyensis Dridi et al. 2012 (type species)
      - Family Methanomethylophilaceae
        - Genus Methanomethylophilus Borrel et al. 2024
          - Methanomethylophilus alvi Borrel et al. 2024 (type species)
- Phylum Thermoproteota
  - Class Methanosuratincolia
    - Order Methanosuratincolales
      - Family Methanosuratincolaceae
      - Genus Methanosuratincola Wu et al. 2025
        - Methanosuratincola petrocarbonis Wu et al. 2025 (type species)

== See also ==
- Extremophile
- Hydrogen cycle
- Kraken Mare
- List of Archaea genera
- Methane clathrate
- Methanogens in digestive tract of ruminants
- Methanopyrus
- Methanotroph
