= Methanobrevibacter cuticularis =

Scientific classification
- Domain: Archaea
- Kingdom: Methanobacteriati
- Phylum: Methanobacteriota
- Class: Methanobacteria
- Order: Methanobacteriales
- Family: Methanobacteriaceae
- Genus: Methanobrevibacter
- Species: M. cuticularis

Binomial name
- Methanobrevibacter cuticularis Leadbetter & Breznak, 1996

Species of archaeon

Methanobrevibacter cuticularis is a species of methanogen archaeon. It was first isolated from the hindgut of the termite Reticulitermes flavipes. It is rod-shaped, ranging in size from 0.34 to 1.6 μm and possesses polar fibers. Its morphology, gram-positive staining reaction, resistance to cell lysis by chemical agents and narrow range of utilizable substrates are typical of species belonging to the family Methanobacteriaceae. It habitates on or near the hindgut epithelium and also attached to filamentous prokaryotes associated with the gut wall. It is one of the predominant gut biota.
