= Methanobrevibacter filiformis =

Scientific classification
- Domain: Archaea
- Kingdom: Methanobacteriati
- Phylum: Methanobacteriota
- Class: Methanobacteria
- Order: Methanobacteriales
- Family: Methanobacteriaceae
- Genus: Methanobrevibacter
- Species: M. filiformis

Binomial name
- Methanobrevibacter filiformis Leadbetter et al. 1998

Species of archaeon

Methanobrevibacter filiformis is a species of methanogen archaeon. It was first isolated from the hindgut of the termite Reticulitermes flavipes. It is rod-shaped and possesses polar fibers. Its morphology, gram-positive staining reaction, resistance to cell lysis by chemical agents and narrow range of utilisable substrates are typical of species belonging to the family Methanobacteriaceae. It habitates on or near the hindgut epithelium and also attached to filamentous prokaryotes associated with the gut wall. It is one of the predominant gut biota.
