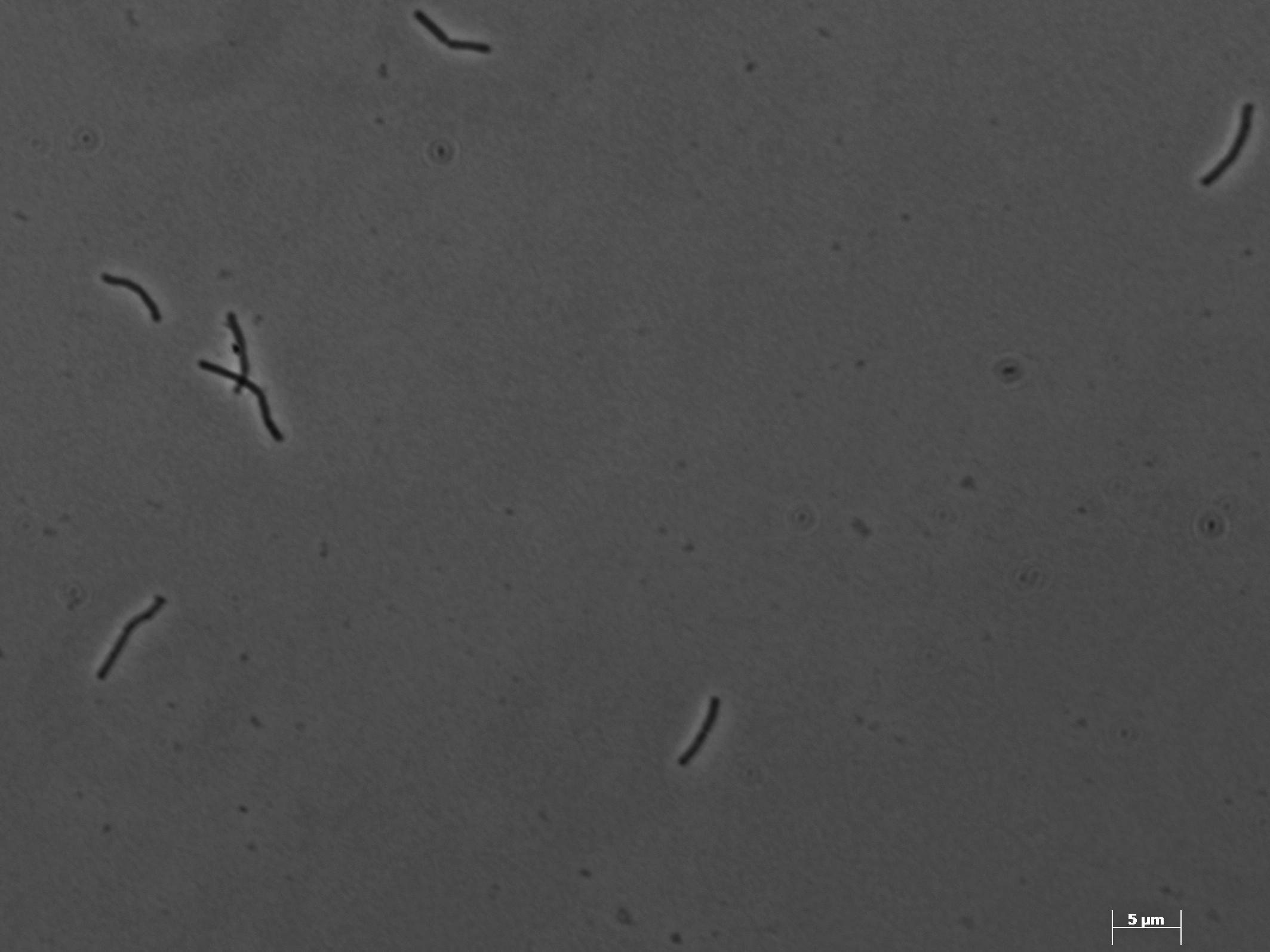
- Methanothermobacter marburgensis strain Marburg (DSM 2133), phase-contrast photo

Scientific classification
- Domain: Archaea
- Kingdom: Methanobacteriati
- Phylum: Methanobacteriota
- Class: Methanobacteria
- Order: Methanobacteriales
- Family: Methanobacteriaceae
- Genus: Methanothermobacter
- Species: M. marburgensis

Binomial name
- Methanothermobacter marburgensis Wasserfallen et al. 2000

= Methanothermobacter marburgensis =

Species of archaeon

Methanothermobacter marburgensis is a thermophilic and obligately autotrophic methanogenic archaeon. The type strain Marburg^{T} was isolated from sewage sludge in the vicinity of the city Marburg, Germany. It was also detected in hot springs. It grows in the temperature between 45 and 70 °C with optimum at 65 °C thus it is classified as thermophile. Cells are rods with length 3–3.5 μm and 0.3–0.4 μm wide, Gram-positive and non-motile. Its genome has been sequenced.

They reduce carbon dioxide with hydrogen into methane as the only pathway for ATP production. It does not require any organic supplements and it grows on mineral media with CO_{2} as a carbon source, H_{2} as a source of electrons, NH_{3} as a nitrogen source, and sulfide as a sulfur source (obligate autotroph). The metabolism of Methanothermobacter marburgensis strain Marburg has been reconstructed in the form of an experimentally validated computer model.

It has been reported that under nickel-limited conditions, Methanothermobacter marburgensis significantly downregulates [NiFe]-hydrogenases, with their functions being substituted by [Fe]-hydrogenase (Hmd) and an electron-donating protein (Elp) complexed with heterodisulfide reductase (Hdr).
