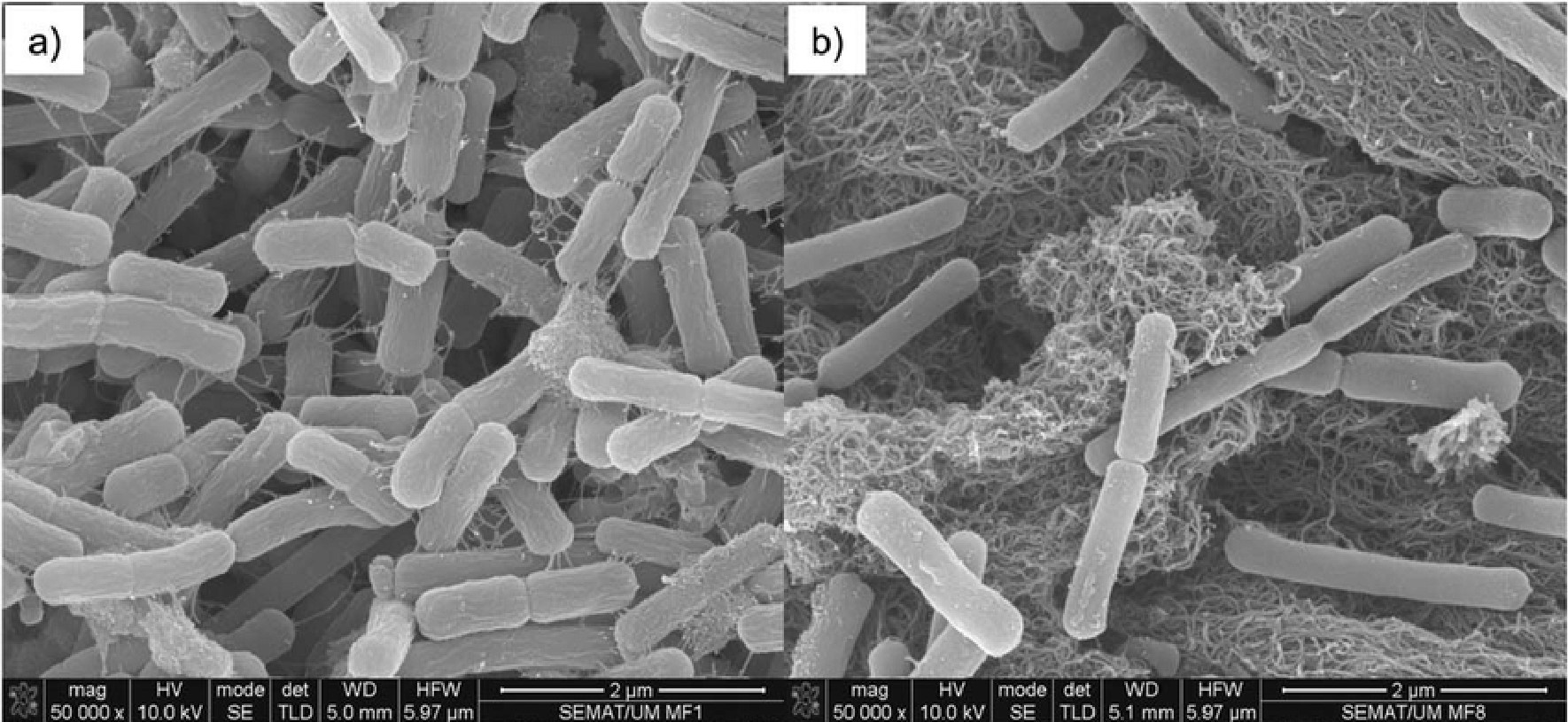
- Methanobacterium formicicum

Scientific classification
- Domain: Archaea
- Kingdom: Methanobacteriati
- Phylum: Methanobacteriota
- Class: Methanobacteria
- Order: Methanobacteriales
- Family: Methanobacteriaceae
- Genus: Methanobacterium; Kluyver and van Niel 1936

Type species
- Methanobacterium formicicum Schnellen 1947

Species
- See text

Synonyms
- "Bacterium" ("Methanobacterium") (Kluyver & van Niel 1936) Breed et al. 1948

= Methanobacterium =

Genus of archaea

Methanobacterium (from Latin methanum, meaning "methane", and bactērium) is a genus of the Methanobacteria class in the Archaea domain, which produce methane as a metabolic byproduct. Despite the name, this genus belongs not to the bacterial domain but the archaeal domain (for instance, they lack peptidoglycan in their cell walls). Methanobacterium are nonmotile and live without oxygen, which is toxic to them, and they only inhabit anoxic environments.

A shared trait by all methanogens is their ability to recycle products. They can use the products of metabolic activities occurring during methanogenesis as substrates for the formation of methane. Methanobacterium species typically thrive in environments with optimal growth temperatures ranging from 28 to 40 °C, and in versatile ecological ranges. They are a part of the scientific world that is still relatively unknown, but methanogens are thought to be some of earth's earliest life forms. They do not create endospores when nutrients are limited. They are ubiquitous in some hot, low-oxygen environments, such as anaerobic digesters, wastewater, and hot springs.

== Discovery ==
In 1776, Alesandro Volta discovered that gas bubbles coming from a freshwater swamp were flammable. This finding led him to believe that methane gas could be produced by living organisms, however, he thought that this methane was coming from decomposing organic matter. In 1933, methanogens were first cultured, revealing that this methane was coming from living organisms.

== Diversity and taxonomy ==
Methanobacterium are a specific genus within the methanogen species. The evolutionary history of Methanobacterium is still relatively unknown, but methanogens are thought to be some of earth's earliest life forms, with origins dating back over 3.4 billion years.

Methanogens, including Methanobacterium species, belong to the archaea domain, characterized by unique features such as unconventional 16S rRNA sequences, distinct lipid structures, and novel cell wall compositions. These organisms are prevalent in extreme environments but are also found in more moderate habitats, exhibiting a wide range of growth temperatures from psychrotrophic to hyperthermophilic, and varying salinity preferences from freshwater to saturated brine. Despite their taxonomic placement within archaea, methanogens display diverse cellular envelopes, which can consist of protein surface layers (S-layers), glycosylated S-layer proteins, additional polymers like methanochondroitin, or pseudomurein in Gram-positive staining species. Methanogens are unique among archaea in their adaptability to a broad spectrum of environmental conditions, with a preference for neutral to moderately alkaline pH values.

Taxonomically, methanogens are classified into 25 genera, distributed across 12 families and five orders, highlighting the substantial phenotypic and genotypic diversity within this group. This taxonomic diversity suggests that methanogenesis, the metabolic pathway through which methanogens produce methane, is an ancient and widespread trait. The monophyletic nature of modern methanogens indicates that methanogenesis likely evolved only once, with all contemporary methanogens sharing a common ancestor. Recent taxonomic schemes reflect the rich diversity and evolutionary history of methanogens, underscoring their importance in anaerobic microbial ecosystems and their intriguing adaptation to diverse environmental niches.

Each species of Methanobacterium is capable of the syntropic process of methane production, with a majority of the species being hydrogenotrophic. The species differ in their ability to use different substrates for the methane production process. The substrates utilized in the methane production process can be hydrogenotrophic, methylotrophic, or acetoclastic.

== Phylogeny ==
The currently accepted taxonomy is based on the List of Prokaryotic names with Standing in Nomenclature (LPSN) and National Center for Biotechnology Information (NCBI).

16S rRNA based LTP_07_2026

- - - Methanobacterium
      - - M. aarhusense Shlimon et al. 2004
        - - M. movilense corrig. Schirmack et al. 2014
          - - M. oryzae Joulian et al. 2000
            - - M. ivanovii Jain et al. 1988
              - - M. veterum Krivushin et al. 2010
                - - M. arcticum Shcherbakova et al. 2011
                  - - M. bryantii Balch & Wolfe 1981
                    - M. espanolae Patel, Sprott & Fein 1990
      - - - M. beijingense Ma, Liu & Dong 2005
          - - - M. lacus Borrel et al. 2012
              - M. spitsbergense Trubitsyn et al. 2024
            - - M. paludis Cadillo-Quiroz et al. 2014
              - - M. aggregans Kern, Linge & Rother 2015
                - M. congolense Cuzin et al. 2001
        - - M. aridiramus Lee et al. 2025
          - - - M. kanagiense Kitamura et al. 2011
              - M. petrolearium Mori & Harayama 2011
            - - M. ferruginis Mori & Harayama 2011
              - - - "M. cahuitense" Dengler et al. 2023
                  - M. subterraneum Kotelnikova, Macario & Pedersen 1998
                - - M. formicicum Schnellen 1947
                  - M. palustre Zellner et al. 1990
  - - - Methanobacterium~
        - - M. flexile Zhu, Liu & Dong 2011
          - - M. alkalithermotolerans Mei et al. 2022
            - - M. alcaliphilum Worakit et al. 1986
              - M. movens Zhu, Liu & Dong 2011
    - - Methanosphaera
      - Methanobrevibacter

53 marker proteins based GTDB 11-RS232

- - - - "Methanobacterium_E"
        Methanobacterium alcaliphilum
      - "Methanobacterium_F"
        Methanobacterium alkalithermotolerans
  - - - "Methanobacterium_D"
        - Methanobacterium oryzae
        - - Methanobacterium bryantii
          - Methanobacterium veterum
            [incl. M. arcticum]
    - - - Methanobacterium
          - - - M. lacus
              - M. spitsbergense
            - - M. paludis
              - - M. aggregans
                - M. congolense
          - - M. aridiramus
            - - M. subterraneum
              - - M. formicicum
                - - M. ferruginis
                  - M. petrolearium
      - Methanosphaera

Unassigned species:

- "M. curvum" Sun, Zhou & Dong 2001
- M. nebraskense Fiore, Zhou & Weber 2026
- "M. propionicum" Stadtman & Barker 1951
- "M. soehngenii" Barker 1936
- "M. suboxydans" Stadtman & Barker 1951
- M. thermaggregans corrig. Blotevogel & Fischer 1988
- M. uliginosum König 1985

== Species ==
There are many different species of Methanobacterium with officially recognized names. A few and listed and described below:

Methanobacterium formicicum is an archaeon found in the rumen of cattle, buffalo, sheep, goats and other animals. Microbes in the gut, degrade nutrients from feed (polysaccharides, proteins, and fats) into organic molecules which later are turned into methane by Methanobacterium such as Methanobacterium formicicum. Methanobacterium formicicum can be found in the human gut as well as in animals and can cause gastrointestinal and metabolic disorders in both humans and animals.

Methanobacterium oryzae was isolated from rice field soil in the Philippines. Methanobacterium, such as Methanobacterium oryzae, that thrive in rice fields often use hydrogen and acetate as their main energy source. This Methanobacterium as well as other species of Methanobacterium found in rice field soils from around the world are a major source of methane which is a dominant greenhouse gas.

Methanobacterium palustre thrives in marshland areas and was first found in a peat bog.

Methanobacterium arcticum was isolated from permafrost sediments in the Russian Arctic. This species of Methanobacterium uses only hydrogen, carbon dioxide, and formate as fuel. Unlike some other Methanobacteria, it does not use acetate to grow.

Methanobacterium thermoautotrophicum Marburg can undergo natural genetic transformation, the transfer of DNA from one cell to another. Genetic transformation in archaeal species, generally, appears to be an adaptation for repairing DNA damage in a cell by utilizing intact DNA information derived from another cell.

Methanobacterium thermaggregans were found from fed-batch fermentation. M. thermaggregans is alkaliphilic and thermophilic and has been suggested as a suitable candidate for biological methane production.

== Genome ==
The genome of seven different Methanobacterium and Methanobrevibacter have been sequenced. Methanobacterium has a strain that demonstrates a genome of approximately 1,350 sequences. About 190 of those strains are specific in BRM9 genes, which are correlated to proteins or prophage. It includes mesophilic methanogens from various anaerobic conditions. However, they carry a tiny amount of methanogen characteristic within the rumen. These genes, which are used for their central metabolism and their pseudomurein cell wall, propose that the species is capable of inhibition by the small molecule inhibitor and vaccine. This is determined by the methane alleviation devices that have the ability to grow the genes found in the rumen.

Methanobacterium plays a role in both the waste and water waste processes due to its abilities of degrading organic substances. Methanobacterium are normally isolated from natural oxygen deficient environments such as, freshwater, marine sediments, wet soils, the rumen and the intestines of animals, humans, and insects. Through molecular findings of the 16S rRNA and mcrA gene, which encodes the methyl coenzyme M reductase on the alpha subunit, shows that there are additional unidentified methanogens that exist in other ecosystems.

== Morphology ==
Methanobacterium are generally bacillus-shaped microbes. Because there are many different species in the Methanobacterium genus, there are a variety of shapes, sizes, and arrangements these microbes can possess. These rod shaped microbes can be curved, straight, or crooked. They can also range in size, can be short or long, and can be found individually, in pairs, or in chains. Some Methanobacterium species can even be found in large clusters or aggregates which consist of long intertwined chains of individual microbes.

There have been many strains of Methanobacterium that have been isolated and studied profoundly. One particular strain of Methanobacterium that has been isolated and studied is Methanobacterium thermoautotrophicum. This revealed the presence of intracytoplasmic membranes, an internal membrane system consisting of 3 membranes stacked on top of each other without a cytoplasm separating them. Methanobacterium palustre is another strain that further confirms a large characteristic of Methanobacterium is a gram-positive cell wall, lacking a peptidoglycan layer outside of its cytoplasmic membrane. The cell wall of the family Methanobacteriaea consists of pseudomurein, a carbohydrate backbone and a cross-linking peptide with amino acids that form the peptide bonds and serve the nature of the bonding and sugar type.

== Physiology ==
Methanobacterium are strict anaerobes, meaning they cannot survive in the presence of oxygen. Most species belonging to this genus are also autotrophs which create organic compounds from inorganic materials such as carbon dioxide. Methanobacterium can be classified as hydrogenotrophic methanogens. Hydrogenotrophic methanogens use hydrogen, carbon dioxide, formate, and alcohols to synthesize methane. These substrates are also important for the growth and maintenance of Methanobacterium. Methanogenesis is a vital part of the carbon cycle as it performs the conversion of organic carbon into methane gas.

This part of the carbon cycle is referred to as the methanogenesis cycle. It is a process involving three different kinds of carbon dioxide reduction, which ultimately lead to the production of methane. However, within each separate pathway, there are intermediary products that are used as substrates in some other part of the cycle. The interconnectedness of products and substrates are defined by the term syntropic. The cycling substrates can be arranged into 3 groups based on the whether the autotrophic carbon dioxide (CO_{2)} reduction was with hydrogen gas (H_{2)}, formate (CH_{2}O_{2}), or secondary alcohols. Some members of this genus can use formate to reduce methane; others live exclusively through the reduction of carbon dioxide with hydrogen.

== Optimal growth temperature ==
Methanobacterium species typically thrive in environments with optimal growth temperatures ranging from 28 to 40 °C. Methanobacteria are widely distributed in geothermal settings like hot springs and hydrothermal vents. This mesophilic temperature range indicates that Methanobacterium organisms are adapted to moderate environmental conditions, neither extremely hot nor cold. This temperature preference allows them to inhabit a variety of anaerobic environments, including soil, sediments, and animal digestive tracts, where conditions often fall within this mesophilic range. Within these habitats, Methanobacterium species contribute to methane production through their hydrogenotrophic metabolism, utilizing hydrogen and carbon dioxide as metabolic substrates.

== Habitat ==
Methanobacterium species inhabit various anaerobic environments, showcasing a versatile ecological range. They can be found in diverse habitats such as soil, wetlands, sediment layers, sewage treatment plants, and the gastrointestinal tracts of animals. Within these environments, Methanobacterium species play crucial roles in anaerobic microbial ecosystems, contributing to processes like organic matter decomposition via methane production through the methanogenesis pathway.

=== In the human gut ===
Methanobacterium is found in the human colon. It is involved in managing the amount of calories that is being consumed, by influencing the process of bacterial breakdown.

There are two specific groups that have undergone isolation and culture from the human intestines. However, methanogens have also been discovered in colostrum and breast milk from mothers who are healthy and lactating. This was discovered from performing the techniques of quantitative polymerase chain reaction (qPCR), culture, and amplicon sequencing.

A species of Methanobacterium called M. smithii is found in the human intestines. M. smithii is able to integrate glycans within the intestines for fixing, which is used for regulating protein expression. An increase of methane concentration in human residue is correlated with BMI.

Methanogens remove hydrogen that remains in the gut, based on hydrogen accumulation in the intestines that can reduce the productivity of the microbial activities. Methanogens can also be used as probiotics. This is possible since methanogens are capable of using trimethylamine as a substrate for methanogenesis. Trimethylamine is produced in the human intestines by intestinal bacteria. An increase of trimethylamine may cause cardiovascular disease. These methanogens are able to utilize hydrogen to decrease trimethylamine while it is growing in the intestines.

== See also ==
- List of Archaea genera
