= Methanobrevibacter smithii =

Scientific classification
- Domain: Archaea
- Kingdom: Methanobacteriati
- Phylum: Methanobacteriota
- Class: Methanobacteria
- Order: Methanobacteriales
- Family: Methanobacteriaceae
- Genus: Methanobrevibacter
- Species: M. smithii

Binomial name
- Methanobrevibacter smithii Balch and Wolfe 1981

Species of archaeon

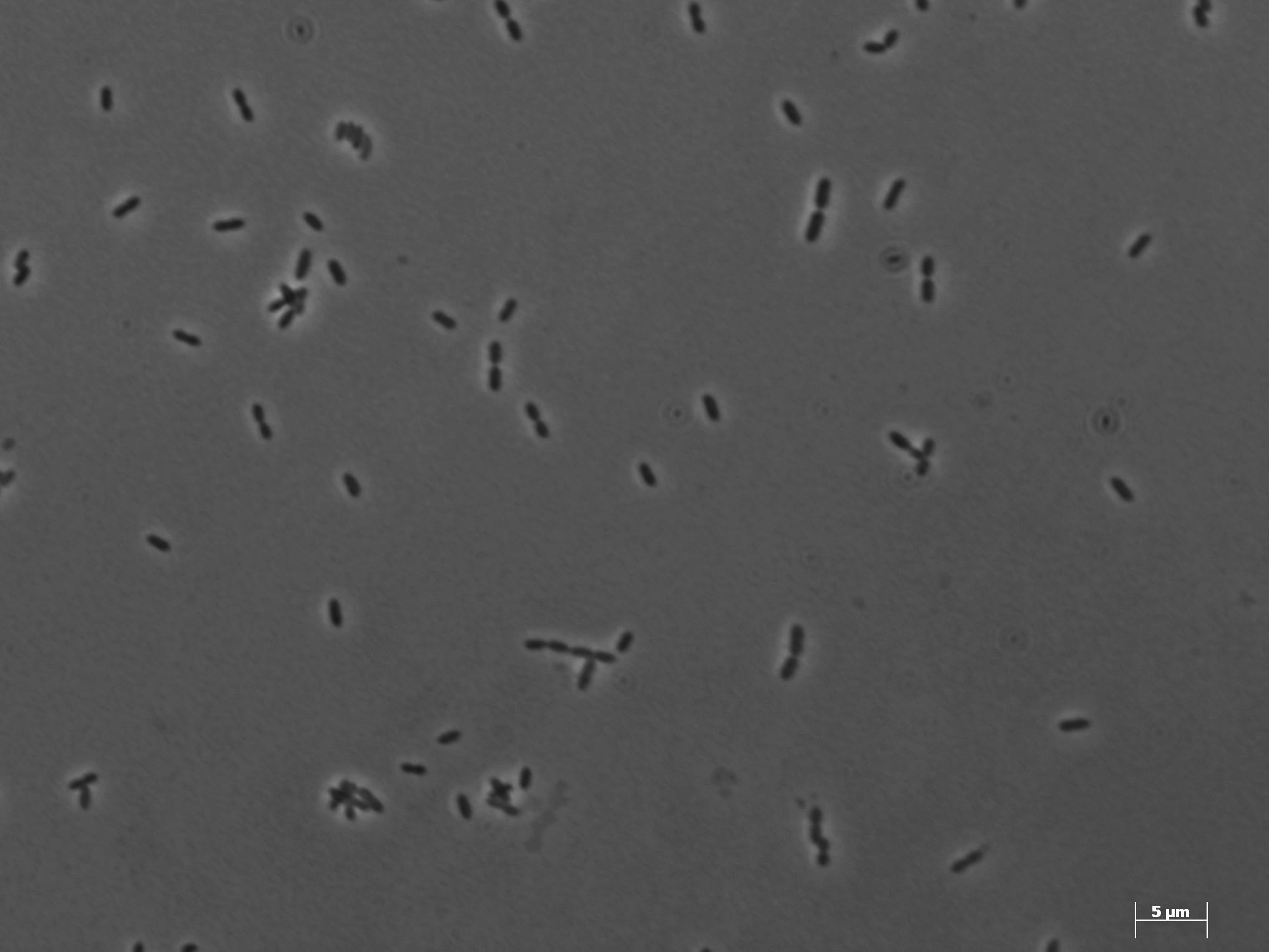
Phase-contrast photo of Methanobrevibacter smithii PS^{T}

Methanobrevibacter smithii is the predominant methanogenic archaeon in the microbiota of the human gut. M. smithii has a coccobacillus shape. It plays an important role in the efficient digestion of polysaccharides (complex sugars) by consuming the end products of bacterial fermentation (H_{2}, CO_{2}, acetate, and formate). M. smithii is a hydrogenotrophic methanogen that utilizes hydrogen by combining it with carbon dioxide to form methane. The removal of hydrogen by M. smithii is thought to allow an increase in the extraction of energy from nutrients by shifting bacterial fermentation to more oxidized end products.

== Importance in the human gut ==
Methanobrevibacter smithii is an anaerobic archaea which enjoys colonizing the colon and rectum thanks to its anaerobic environment, optimal pH (6.5-7), and slow transit time. M. smithii is the most common methanogenic archaeon in the human gut microbiota. M. smithii is paramount in digestive processes, and has a high prevalence in human feces. M. smithii is found in breast milk and breast feeding is a major route of M. smithii acquisition and colonization in newborns. Methanogens, including M. smithii, play a role as one of the three central hydrogen-consuming microorganisms or hydrogenotrophs in the human gut microbiota, along with various acetogenic bacteria and sulfate-reducing bacteria. Understanding these microorganisms and how they contribute to hydrogen metabolism in the gut can provide insight into the efficiency of dietary fermentation. Accumulation of hydrogen in the gut reduces the efficiency of microbial fermentation. Methanogenic archaea are therefore particularly significant for the human gut, because they are pivotal in the removal of excess hydrogen.

=== Metabolism ===
M. smithii presents a relatively greater expression of genes which employ carbon dioxide (CO_{2}), hydrogen gas (H_{2}), and formate (HCO^{−}_{2}) for methanogenesis, compared to non-gut methanogens. The main energy producing route of M. smithii metabolism comes from the utilization of hydrogen and carbon dioxide shown in the equation: 4 H_{2} + CO_{2} → CH_{4} + 2 H_{2}O. M. smithii can also use formate as a carbon source by converting it to CO_{2} via formate dehydrogenase ezymes. It also has an intact pathway to allow for CO_{2} utilization gene cluster for the methanogenic consumption of Bacteroides thetaiotaomicron-produced metabolite.

M. smithii supports methanogenic and nonmethanogenic removal of diverse bacterial end products of fermentation.

The dominant archaeon in the human gut ecosystem affects the specificity and efficiency of bacterial digestion of dietary polysaccharides. This influences the person's calorie harvest and body fat. M. smithii, along with certain bacteria, is more often found in lean individuals than in those who are overweight. Researchers have sequenced M. smithii genome, indicating that M. smithii may be a therapeutic target for reducing energy harvest in obese humans.

=== Microbial interactions ===
Methanobrevibacter smithii is able to interact with Bacteroides thetaiotaomicron in mouse co-colonization studies where they alter the metabolic pathways of each other. In the presence of M. smithii, B. thetaiotaomicron increases its production of acetate which can be utilized by an incomplete reductive tricarboxylic acid cycle (rTCA) in M. smithii for biosynthesis. During this relationship, M. smithii also increases expression of its metabolic pathways for nitrogen assimilation, ethanol and methanol utilization, and formate utilization. This relationship was found to significantly decrease the cecal ethanol content in co-colonized mice due the increased utilization by M. smithii.

The gut microbiota is dominated by gram-negative Bacteroidota, and Bacillota (mostly gram-positive). Archaea are most prominently represented by the methanogenic M. smithii. M. smithii is believed to be a therapeutic target for manipulation and an adaptation to the gut ecosystem.

== M. smithii in human health and disease ==
=== In Anorexic Patients ===
In 2009, the largest human study concerning obesity and gut microbiota to date was conducted. Obesity disorders are the result of an imbalance and have serious consequences such as cardiovascular disease, type 2 diabetes, and colon cancer. The gut microbiota and environment contributes to the energy imbalance because of its involvement in energy intake, conversion and storage. Culture-independent methods have shown that high proportions of methanogens can comprise up to 10% of all anaerobes in the colons of healthy adults. The quantification average of M. smithii for the anorexic group was much greater than the lean and obese group. Thus, higher amounts of M. smithii were found in anorexic patients than lean patients.

The development of Methanobrevibacter in anorexia patients may be associated with an adaptive attempt towards optimal exploitation of the low caloric diet of anorexic patients. Hence, an increase in M. smithii leads to the optimization of food transformation in low caloric diets. M. smithii could also be related to constipation, a common condition for anorexic patients.

=== M. smithii and constipation ===
Observational studies show a strong association between delayed intestinal transit and the production of methane. Experimental data suggest a direct inhibitory activity of methane on the colonic and ileal smooth muscle and a possible role for methane as a gasotransmitter. Statins can inhibit archaeal cell membrane biosynthesis apparently without affecting bacterial numbers as demonstrated in livestock and humans. This opens the possibility of a therapeutic intervention that targets a specific etiological factor of constipation while protecting the intestinal microbiome. While it is generally believed that statins inhibit methane production via their effect on cell membrane biosynthesis, mediated by inhibition of the HMG-CoA reductase, there is accumulating evidence for an alternative or additional mechanism of action where statins inhibit methanogenesis directly. It appears that this other mechanism may predominate when the lactone form of statins, particularly lovastatin, is administered.

=== Other Disease Associations ===
Methanobrevibacter smithii is also found in dental plaque and in the vagina (with vaginosis).

== Cell wall and cell membrane compared to bacteria ==
The cell wall and cell membrane of Methanobrevibacter smithii determine susceptibility to antibiotics and statins. The cell wall is composed of pseudopeptidoglycan (and not peptidoglycan as in bacteria) which makes archaea resistant to lysozyme and many antibiotics that interfere with cell wall synthesis. The cell membrane consists of a lipid bilayer or monolayer, the backbone of which is composed of isoprene units that are linked to glycerol by ether bonds. In contrast, the lipid bilayer of bacteria consists of a fatty acid backbone that is linked to glycerol by an ester bond. The presence of statin-sensitive isoprene units in the cell membrane of archaea allows statins to selectively interfere with the growth of archaea while leaving the cell membrane of bacteria unaffected. While bacteria do not use isoprene units in their cell membrane they are still required elsewhere. These bacterial isoprene units are, however, synthesized by the mevalonate pathway (MEP) that is not inhibited by statins.

== Viruses ==
Methanobrevibacter smithii PS chromosome contains a provirus derived from the integration of a head-tailed archaeal virus genome. The provirus was shown to be sporadically induced, resulting in release of virions with isometric icoahedral capsids and long non-contractile tails (siphovirus-like morphology). The Methanobrevibacter smithii tailed virus 1 (MSTV1) was found to coexists with its host in a stable equilibrium, with average virus-to-host ratio maintained at ~0.1 both in vitro and in vivo. A similar dynamics is also typical of bacteriophages infecting gut bacteria, suggesting that bacterial and archaeal viruses in the gastrointestinal tract have convergence of a similar propagation strategy.
