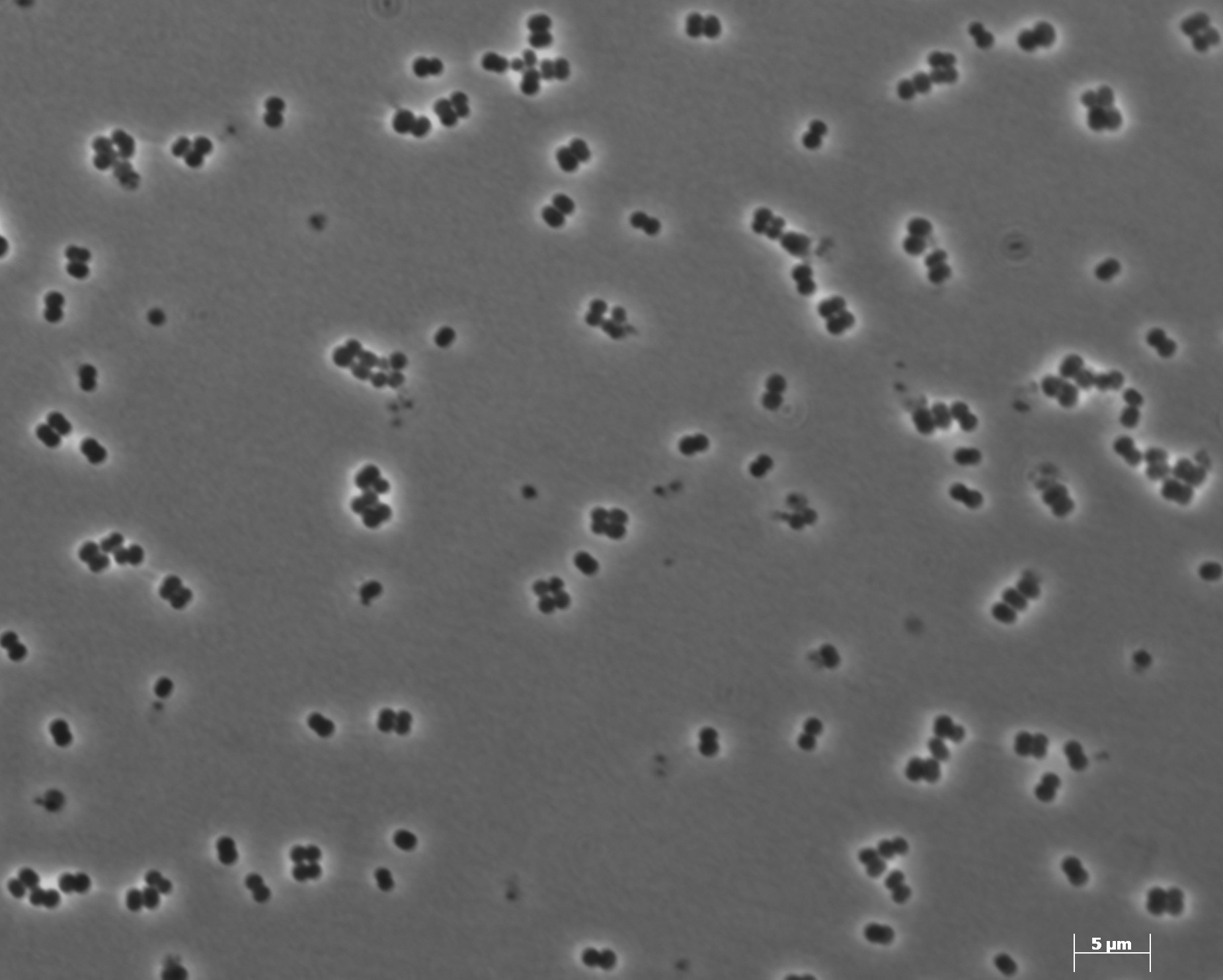
- Methanosphaera stadtmanae type strain MCB-3 (DSM 3091; JCM 11832), phase-contrast photo.

Scientific classification
- Domain: Archaea
- Kingdom: Methanobacteriati
- Phylum: Methanobacteriota
- Class: Methanobacteria
- Order: Methanobacteriales
- Family: Methanobacteriaceae
- Genus: Methanosphaera
- Species: M. stadtmanae

Binomial name
- Methanosphaera stadtmanae Miller & Wollin, 1985

= Methanosphaera stadtmanae =

Species of archaeon

Methanosphaera stadtmanae is a methanogen archaeon. It is a non-motile, Gram-positive, spherical-shaped organism that obtains energy by using hydrogen to reduce methanol to methane. It does not possess cytochromes and is part of the large intestine's biota.
