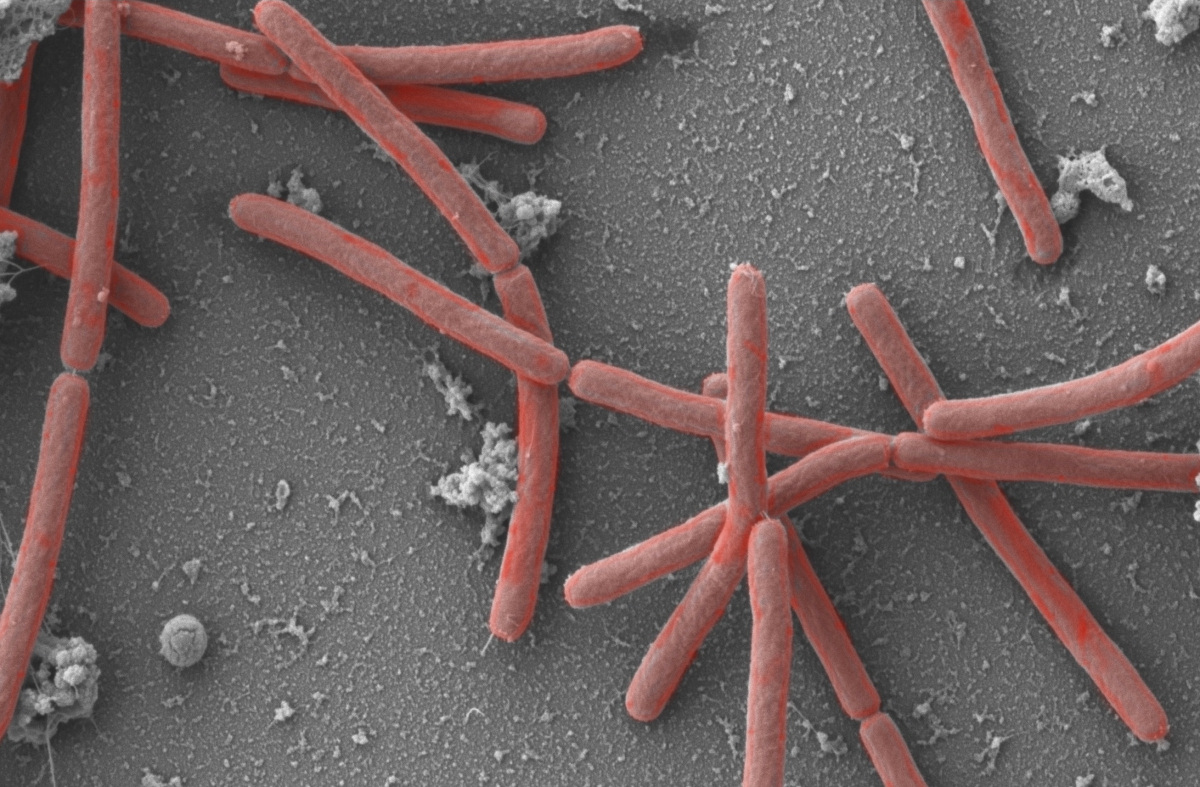
- Methanothermobacter thermautotrophicus

Scientific classification
- Domain: Archaea
- Kingdom: Methanobacteriati
- Phylum: Methanobacteriota
- Class: Methanobacteria
- Order: Methanobacteriales
- Family: Methanobacteriaceae
- Genus: Methanothermobacter; Wasserfallen et al. 2000

Type species
- Methanothermobacter thermautotrophicus (Zeikus & Wolfe 1972) Wasserfallen et al. 2000

Species
- M. crinale; M. defluvii; M. marburgensis; M. tenebrarum; M. thermautotrophicus; M. thermoflexus; M. thermophilus; M. wolfei

Synonyms
- "Methanobacter" Boone, Whitman & Rouviére 1993

= Methanothermobacter =

Genus of archaea

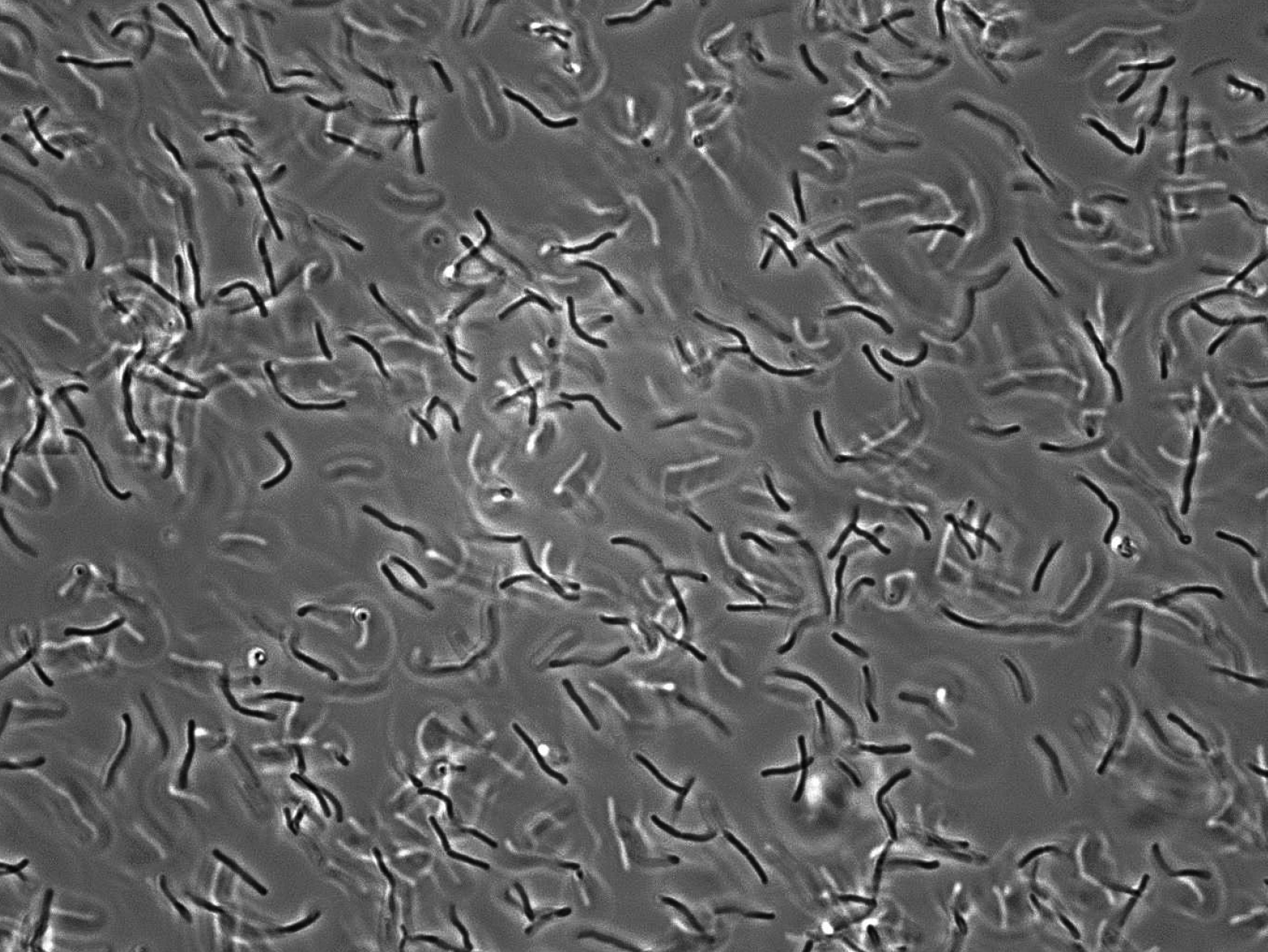
Phase contrast image of Methanothermobacter marburgensis DSM 2133. Specimen was obtained in late exponential phase from a fed-batch fermentation. The cells are rod shaped and elongated.

Methanothermobacter is a genus of archaeans in the family Methanobacteriaceae. The species within this genus are thermophilic and grow best at temperatures between 55 °C and 65 °C. They are methanogens; they use carbon dioxide and hydrogen as substrates to produce methane for energy.

== Phylogeny ==
The currently accepted taxonomy is based on the List of Prokaryotic names with Standing in Nomenclature (LPSN) and National Center for Biotechnology Information (NCBI).

16S rRNA based LTP_07_2026

- Methanobacteriaceae
  - - Methanothermobacter~
      - M. crinale
      - M. tenebrarum
  - - - Methanothermobacter
        - M. wolfei
        - - - M. marburgensis
            - Methanobacterium thermaggregans
          - - M. thermautotrophicus
            - - M. thermophilus
              - - M. defluvii
                - M. thermoflexus
    - other

53 marker proteins based GTDB 11-RS232

- - - DSM‑23052 "Methanothermobacter_A"
      Methanothermobacter tenebrarum
  - - - "Methanothermobacteraceae" Methanothermobacter
        - M. wolfei
        - - M. marburgensis
          - M. thermautotrophicus [incl. M. defluvii]
    - Methanobacteriaceae

== Metabolism ==
The metabolism of Methanothermobacter thermautotrophicus has been reconstructed in the form of experimentally validated computer models for the two strains Z-245 and ΔH.

== See also ==
- List of Archaea genera
