= Methenyltetrahydromethanopterin cyclohydrolase =

Class of enzymes

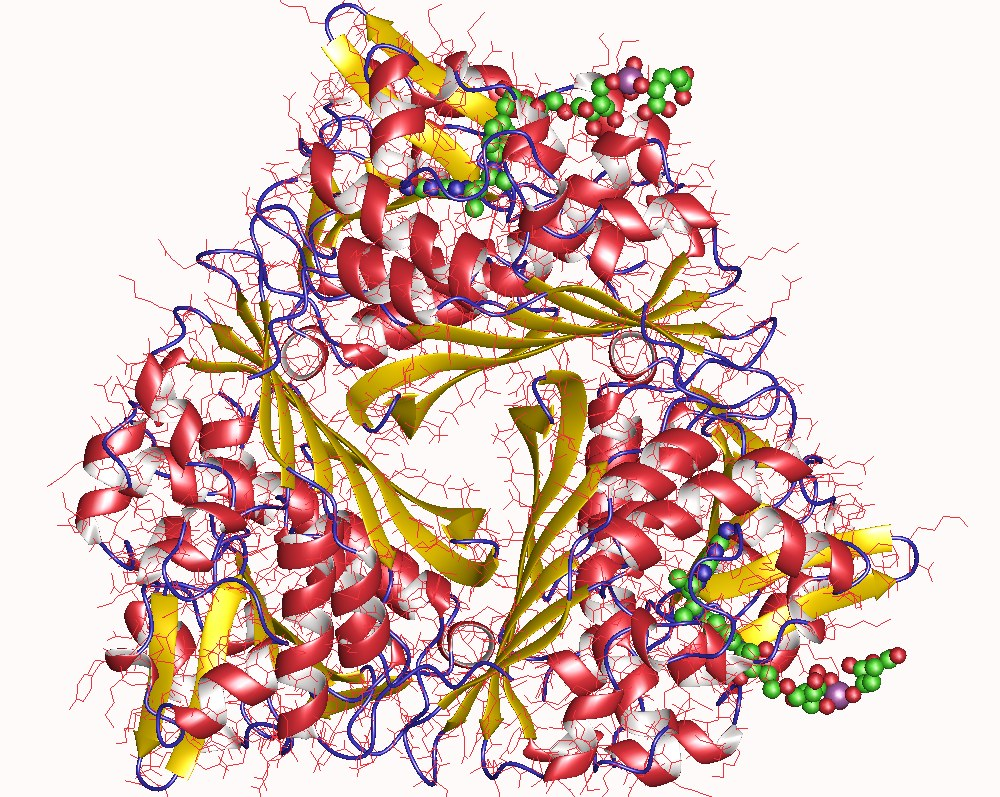
- Methenyltetrahydromethanopterin cyclohydrolase trimer, Archaeoglobus fulgidus

Identifiers
- EC no.: 3.5.4.27
- CAS no.: 99533-50-3

Databases
- BRENDA: enzyme data
- ExPASy: NiceZyme view
- KEGG: enzyme entry
- MetaCyc: metabolic pathway
- Rhea: reactions
- PDB structures: RCSB PDB PDBe PDBsum
- Gene Ontology: AmiGO / QuickGO
Search
- PMC: articles
- PubMed: articles
- NCBI: proteins

Methenyltetrahydromethanopterin cyclohydrolase (EC 3.5.4.27) is an enzyme characterised from a Methanobacterium that catalyzes the hydrolysis of 5,10-(methanylylidene)tetrahydromethanopterin to N(5)-formyl-5,6,7,8-tetrahydromethanopterin and ammonia:

5,10-(methanylylidene)tetrahydromethanopterin
H_{2}O
NH_{3}
N(5)-formyl-5,6,7,8-tetrahydromethanopterin

The reaction is part of the biosynthesis of the carriers of one-carbon units in archaea, equivalent to the role of folic acid in other organisms. The structure of the enzyme has been determined by X-ray crystallography.

This enzyme is a hydrolase, one acting on carbon-nitrogen bonds other than peptide bonds, specifically in cyclic amidines. The systematic name of this enzyme class is 5,10-methenyltetrahydromethanopterin 10-hydrolase (decyclizing). Other names in common use include 5,10-methenyltetrahydromethanopterin cyclohydrolase, N5,N10-methenyltetrahydromethanopterin cyclohydrolase, and methenyl-H4MPT cyclohydrolase.
