= Formatotrophs =

Organisms that assimilate formate or formic acid

Formatotrophs are organisms that can assimilate formate or formic acid to use as a carbon source or for reducing power. Some authors classify formatotrophs as one of the five trophic groups of methanogens, which also include hydrogenotrophs, acetotrophs, methylotrophs, and alcoholotrophs. Formatotrophs have garnered attention for applications in biotechnology as part of a "formate bioeconomy", in which synthesized formate could be used as a nutrient for microorganisms. Formate can be electrochemically synthesized from CO_{2} and renewable energy, and formatotrophs may be genetically modified to enhance production of biochemical products to be used as biofuels. Technical limitations in culturing formatotrophs have limited the discovery of natural formatotrophs and impeded research on their formate-metabolizing enzymes, which are of interest for applications in carbon sequestration and astrobiology.

== Etymology ==
Formatotrophs gain their name from the Latin: formica, meaning "ant" (formic acid having been named for its presence as a chemical defense in ants) and the Ancient Greek: Τροφικος, romanized: trophikos, meaning "pertaining to nourishment or food".

== Natural formatotrophs and their ecological role ==
Formatotrophs perform key metabolic processes through syntrophic relationships. In these relationships, formate is harvested for energy or carbon metabolism in diverse environments. These reactions are of particular importance in biogeochemical processes related to carbon cycling and transfer of reducing agent, such as hydrogen, acting as a keystone with abiotic formate. Some methanogenic organisms convert formate into hydrogen and bicarbonate, providing hydrogen for other methanogens. Formate can be assimilated by formatotrophs in syntrophic associations with methanogens present during oxidation of formate; otherwise, formate oxidation would not be energetically sufficient to support growth and is thermodynamically disfavored (△G = +1.3 kJ /mol). Thus, at least one methanogenic partner microorganism must be present to remove hydrogen. Some microorganisms, such as desulfurococcus amylolyticus, are able to convert formate into carbon dioxide, acetate, citrate, and ethanol.

=== Formate oxidation equation ===
$\ce{HCOO- + H2O -> HCO3- + H2}$

=== Examples of natural formatotrophs ===
- Methylacidiphilum sp. RTK17.1
- Cupriavidus necator
- Desulfurococcus amylolyticus
- Thermococcus onnurineus
- Methylobacterium extorquens

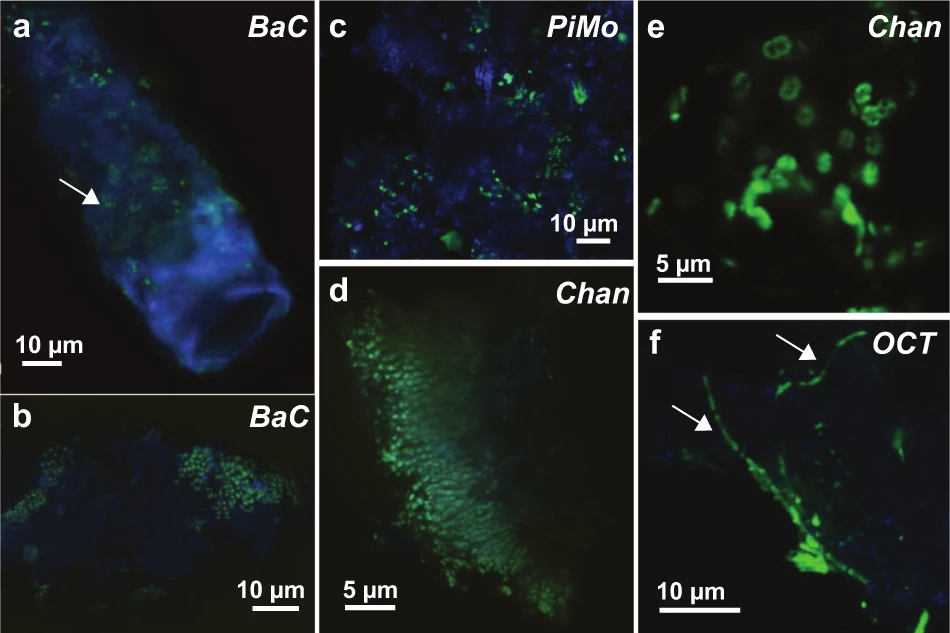
Confocal laser scanning microscopy images showing different microbial morphotypes in chimney samples from the Lost City hydrothermal field

Recent metagenomic studies indicate widespread presence of potential formatotrophs in the Lost City hydrothermal field, an area of alkaline hydrothermal chimneys in the Atlantic Ocean, where serpentinization reactions of rock matter form calcium carbonate structures, hydrogen, methane, formate and other components. The exteriors of the chimneys are usually coated in biofilm. Harsh environmental conditions limit the development of microorganisms because chemical reactions keep concentrations of dissolved inorganic carbon low, indicating that carbon dioxide is not the primary carbon source. Thus, initial studies hypothesized that formate was the main carbon source due to the high concentrations of formate (36 to 158 μM) found in the field. The metabolism of microbial communities in the hydrothermal field are largely unknown due to difficulties with laboratory isolation and culture. Metagenomic and genomic evidence supports the assimilation of formate in the Lost City chimneys as the main carbon source. Metagenome assembled genomes (MAGs) determined that the most abundant genome was in the methanosarcinales, which did not present metabolic pathways related with formate metabolism, and chloroflexota (formerly chloroflexi) MAGs were five times less abundant.

The biofilm formed over the chimneys in the Lost City provides a glimpse of one possible carbon cycle that may have been in operation in the early days of life on earth, in an ecosystem based on geochemical reactions. Similarly, studies of carbon assimilation strategies in ultrabasic groundwater explored the chemosynthesic microbial reactions in wells drilled into the ultramafic Coast Range Ophiolite Microbial Observatory (CROMO) and found that the microbial communities present in those aquifers use the products of serpentinization, including formate and methane, as carbon sources.

C. necator is one of the most well-studied aerobic formatotrophs. It can use carbon dioxide, formate, and hydrogen as carbon and energy sources and has a denitrification process. It is a model microorganism studied for production of polyhydroxyalkanoate, a compound of interest in bioplastic engineering. It has been gaining particular attention as a chassis for metabolic engineering for the synthesis of alcohols and other bio-based compounds. A significant limitation for further engineering with this strain is the limited cell density that can be achieved in chemically defined media.

=== Formate assimilation metabolic pathways ===
Natural metabolic pathways for formate assimilation include the reductive pentose phosphate pathway, serine pathway, the reductive acetyl-CoA pathway in acetogens and methanogens, and the glycine pathway. The reductive pentose phosphate pathway uses 11 formate molecules to produce 1 acetyl-CoA, whereas the reductive acetyl-CoA pathway uses only 4.

Table 1: Summary of metabolic pathways for formate assimilation
Pathway	Amount of formate required to synthesize acetyl-CoA
Reductive pentose phosphate pathway	11 formate molecules (4 for NADPH regeneration and 7 for ATP production)
Serine pathway	7 formate molecules (1 assimilated, 3 to provide NADPH, and 3 for ATP generation)
Reductive acetyl-CoA pathway in acetogens and methanogens	4 formate molecules (1 assimilated, 3 to provide NADPH)

== Formatotrophs for carbon sequestration ==
The low ionization potential of formate makes it a good electron donor to provide reducing power to microorganisms. To sequester carbon, the production of formate by electrosynthesis — an abiotic process — could be integrated with a biotic process that uses it as a carbon source. Formatotrophic microorganism could feasibly be used to produce valuable chemicals. Few formatotrophs have been studied, and thus most research into fermentation of formate is focused on the development of synthetic pathways or matching enzymes from different microorganisms to create totally new pathways and on the improvement of enzymes by directed evolution techniques. There are many pathways that could potentially assimilate formate for the production of biofuels, other biosynthetic products or single-cell protein, whether by using existing formate-fixing reactions or by designing novel enzymes.

The US Department of Energy, US National Renewable Energy Laboratory and US Advanced Research Projects Agency–Energy have set up funding opportunities to improve formate assimilation with C. necator.

Microorganism growing in serpentinization systems may aid in understanding carbon cycling between abiotic and biotic systems. These studies have further applications in astrobiology and studies of evolution and the emergence of life.
