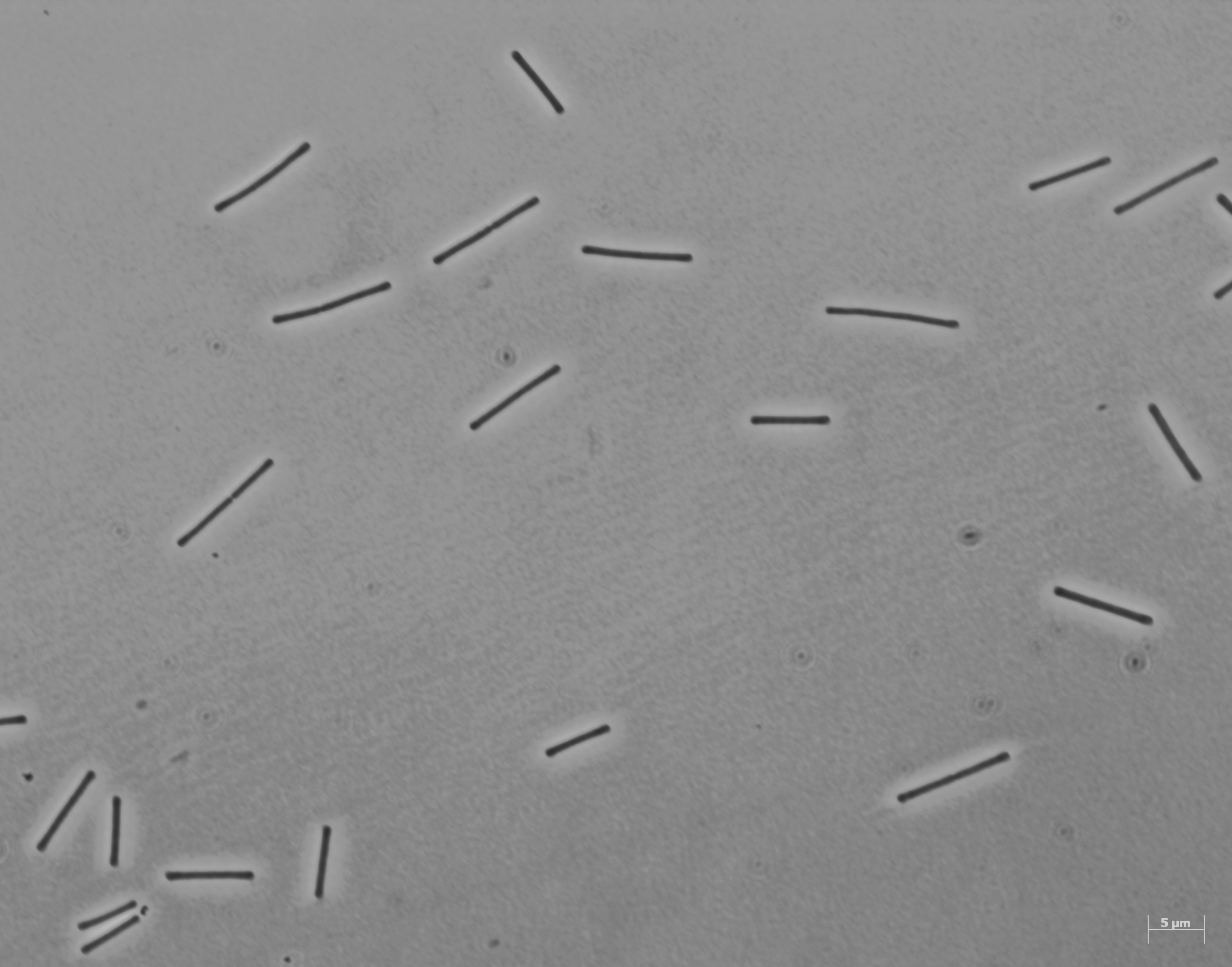

Scientific classification
- Domain: Archaea
- Kingdom: Methanobacteriati
- Phylum: Methanobacteriota
- Class: Methanopyri
- Order: Methanopyrales; Huber and Stetter, 2002
- Family: Methanopyraceae; Huber and Stetter, 2002
- Genus: Methanopyrus; Kurr et al., 1992
- Species: M. kandleri

Binomial name
- Methanopyrus kandleri Kurr et al., 1992

= Methanopyrus =

Genus of archaea

Methanopyrus is a genus of methanogen, with a single described species, Methanopyrus kandleri (type strain AV19). It is a rod-shaped hyperthermophile, discovered on the wall of a black smoker from the Gulf of California at a depth of 2,000 m, at temperatures of 84–110 °C. Strain 116 was discovered in black smoker fluid of the Kairei hydrothermal field; it can survive and reproduce at 122 °C. M. kandleri also requires a high ionic concentration (>1 M) in order for growth and cellular activity. Due to the species' high resilience and extreme environment, M. kandleri is also classified as an extremophile. It lives in a hydrogen–carbon dioxide rich environment, and like other methanogens reduces the latter to methane. It is placed among the phylum Methanobacteriota forming its own class.

== Microbiological characteristics ==
=== Morphology ===
Methanopyrus kandleri is a rod-shaped methanogen with an approximate length of 2–14 μm and diameter of 0.5 μm. The cellular membrane of M. kandleri is unique as it consists of terpenoid lipids, believed to be one of the most primitive lipids and a predecessor to phytanyl di-ethers found in later archaea. Terpenoid lipids are a group of lipids containing cholesterol, hopanoids, carotenoid, phytane, and bisphytane. Although terpenoids are the main component of the membrane in M. kandleri, they are more of a supporting structure in eukaryote and bacteria. M. kandleri is motile via polar flagella tufts.

Methanopyrus kandleri has a high concentration of cyclic 2,3-diphosphoglycerate. This compound is often found in hyperthermophiles, helping to prevent protein denaturation in high temperatures. The increased concentration of cyclic 2,3-diphosphoglycerate protects the methanogen, helping it survive in an environment that many other organisms could not. Beyond this compound to help protect the proteins, M. kandleri also has a high salt concentration inside its membrane. This increased concentration of salt helps with enzyme stability and promotes activity of the enzymes at higher temperatures.

=== Metabolism ===
As a methanogen, M. kandleri utilizes hydrogen as an electron source and reduces carbon dioxide from the environment into methane, a process known as methanogenesis. M. kandleri is a chemolithoautotrophic, obligate anaerobe, i.e. never uses oxygen as a final electron acceptor and cannot tolerate its presence.

== Habitat ==
Cultures of M. kandleri have been isolated from various submarine hydrothermal vents from locations in the Gulf of California, Central Indian Ridge, Mid-Atlantic Ridge, and Iceland. The species was first discovered on the wall of a black smoker from the Gulf of California at a depth of 2,000 m, at temperatures of 84–110 °C. M. kandleri can survive up to temperatures of 122 °C, although optimal growth has been determined to be at 98 °C. High internal ionic cell concentrations (>1 M) are required for cell growth and activity. Due to the extremity of environment that M. kandleri resides in, it is hypothesized that further phylogenetic isolation has occurred due to the exclusivity of the species niche.

== Genomic properties ==
The complete genome of Methanopyrus kandleri was sequenced by researchers at Fidelity Systems. It was determined to be a GC-rich genome containing 1,694,969 nucleotides of which about 62.1% is guanine or cytosine. The single circular chromosome possesses 1,691 protein-coding genes and 39 RNA genes. The species also possesses a large number of orphan genes, possibly through viral gene transfer.

== Future research ==
Methanopyrus kandleri is also the only species known to have topoisomerase V. Topoisomerase V allows for M. kandleri to survive in such high temperatures and helps to relax both positively and negatively supercoiled DNA . Topoisomerase V is a unique enzyme because it possesses both topoisomerase and DNA repair activities, specifically multiple DNA repair sites that can act independently of each other even if there is damage to one of the sites on the DNA. Although topoisomerase V is useful in this case, finding other hyperthermophiles that have topoisomerase V has proven difficult. This lack of topoisomerase V in other archaeon has led researchers to believe that the origin of the enzyme in M. kandleri is a result of viral gene transfer and the unusual amount of orphan genes in the species provides evidence for this theory. Additionally, the evolved cellular responses in M. kandleri due to its extreme environment has been another subject of research, as scientists look to apply the resilient enzymatic processes for industrial purposes.

== See also ==
- List of Archaea genera
