= Methanofollis =

Scientific classification
- Domain: Archaea
- Kingdom: Methanobacteriati
- Phylum: Methanobacteriota
- Class: "Methanomicrobia"
- Order: Methanomicrobiales
- Family: Methanomicrobiaceae
- Genus: Methanofollis; Zellner et al. 1999

Type species
- Methanofollis tationis (Zabel, König & Winter 1986) Zellner et al. 1999

Species
- M. aquaemaris; M. ethanolicus; M. fontis; M. formosanus; M. liminatans; M. propanolicus; M. tationis

Genus of archaea

Methanofollis is a genus of archaean in the family Methanomicrobiaceae.

== Description and significance ==
Methanofollis ("a methane-producing bag") is a non-motile, Gram-negative, obligately anaerobic, mesophilic archaeon that produces methane. It grows between the temperatures 20–45 °C (optimum 34–40 °C), and at the pH of around 7.

== Genome structure ==
The genome of the archaeon has not yet sequenced. The G + C content of the DNA is determined to be 60.0%.

== Cell structure and metabolism ==
The cells of Methanofollis are highly irregular cocci, with diameter of 1.25–2.0 μm. The major polar lipids are phospholipids, glycolipids, and phosphoglycolipids. It utilizes H_{2}/CO_{2}, formate, 2-propanol/CO_{2}, and 2-butanol/CO_{2} for growth and methanogenesis. No growth has been observed on acetate, trimethylamine, methanol, ethanol, 2-propanol, isobutanol, or 2-butanol as catabolic substrates.

== Ecology ==
Most species of the archaeon are isolated from anaerobic high-rate wastewater bioreactors or solfataric fields. For example, M. tationis was isolated from a solfataric field on Mount Tatio in the Atacama desert in northern Chile.

== Phylogeny ==
The currently accepted taxonomy is based on the List of Prokaryotic names with Standing in Nomenclature (LPSN) and National Center for Biotechnology Information (NCBI).

16S rRNA based LTP_07_2026

- Methanofollis
  - - M. aquaemaris Lai & Chen 2001
    - M. formosanus Wu, Chen & Lai 2005
  - - - M. ethanolicus Imachi et al. 2009
      - M. propanolicus Dengler et al. 2026
    - - M. fontis Chen et al. 2020
      - - M. liminatans (Zellner et al. 1990) Zellner et al. 1999
        - M. tationis (Zabel, König & Winter 1986) Zellner et al. 1999

53 marker proteins based GTDB 11-RS232

- Methanofollis
  - - M. aquaemaris
    - M. formosanus
  - - M. ethanolicus
    - - M. fontis
      - - M. liminatans
        - M. tationis

== See also ==
- List of Archaea genera
