= N-Acetyltalosaminuronic acid =

Names
- IUPAC name 2-Acetamido-2-deoxy-α-L-talopyranuronic acid
- Systematic IUPAC name (2R,3S,4S,5R,6R)-5-Acetamido-3,4,6-trihydroxyoxane-2-carboxylic acid
- Other names Talanac; α-L-N-Acetyltalosaminuronic acid; α-L-2-N-Acetylamino-2-desoxytaluronic acid; α-L-Talopyranuronic acid, 2-(acetylamino)-2-deoxy-, (5Z,11α,13E,15S)-; NAT

Identifiers
| CAS Number | 90319-06-5 |
| 3D model (JSmol) | Interactive image; Interactive image; Interactive image |
| ChEBI | CHEBI:85106 |
| ChemSpider | 21106455 |
| MeSH | acid N-acetyltalosaminuronic acid |
| PubChem CID | 146155 |
| UNII | V3WF9VU8DS |
| CompTox Dashboard (EPA) | DTXSID70238090 |
- InChI: InChI=1S/C8H13NO7/c1-2(10)9-3-4(11)5(12)6(7(13)14)16-8(3)15/h3-6,8,11-12,15H,1H3,(H,9,10)(H,13,14)/t3-,4+,5+,6-,8-/m0/s1 Key: KSOXQRPSZKLEOR-FPJCOBNTSA-N; InChI=1/C8H13NO7/c1-2(10)9-3-4(11)5(12)6(7(13)14)16-8(3)15/h3-6,8,11-12,15H,1H3,(H,9,10)(H,13,14)/t3-,4+,5+,6-,8-/m0/s1 Key: KSOXQRPSZKLEOR-FPJCOBNTBW
- SMILES: O[C@H]1O[C@@H]([C@H](O)[C@H](O)[C@@H]1NC(C)=O)C(O)=O; O[C@H]1O[C@@H]([C@H](O)[C@H](O)[C@@H]1NC(C)=O)C(O)=O; CC(=O)N[C@@H]1[C@@H]([C@@H]([C@@H](O[C@H]1O)C(=O)O)O)O

Properties
| Chemical formula | C_{8}H_{13}NO_{7} |
| Molar mass | 235.19132 g/mol |
- Except where otherwise noted, data are given for materials in their standard state (at 25 °C [77 °F], 100 kPa). verify (what is ?) Infobox references

N-Acetyltalosaminuronic acid is a uronic acid. It is a component of pseudopeptidoglycan, a structural polymer found in the cell walls in some types of Archaea. In archaea, the beta-1,3-glycosidic bond links N-acetylglucosamine (NAG) and N-acetyltalosaminuronic (NAT) acid in pseudomurein, providing resistance to lysozyme.
