= Methanosphaera =

Scientific classification
- Domain: Archaea
- Kingdom: Methanobacteriati
- Phylum: Methanobacteriota
- Class: Methanobacteria
- Order: Methanobacteriales
- Family: Methanobacteriaceae
- Genus: Methanosphaera; Miller and Wolin 1985

Type species
- Methanosphaera stadtmanae corrig. Miller & Wolin 1985

Species
- M. cuniculi; "M. massiliense"; M. stadtmanae

Genus of archaea

Methanosphaera is a genus of Archaea within the family Methanobacteriaceae. It was distinguished from other genera within Methanobacteriaceae in 1985 on the basis of the oligonucleotide sequence of its 16S RNA. Like other archaea within Methanobacteriaceae, those of Methanosphaera are methanogens, but while most use formate to reduce carbon dioxide, those of Methanosphaera use hydrogen to reduce methanol to methane.

== Phylogeny ==
The currently accepted taxonomy is based on the List of Prokaryotic names with Standing in Nomenclature (LPSN) and National Center for Biotechnology Information (NCBI).

16S rRNA based LTP_07_2026

- Thermosphaera
  - M. cuniculi
  - M. stadtmanae

53 marker proteins based GTDB 11-RS232

- Methanosphaera
  - M. cuniculi Biavati, Vast & Ferry 1990
  - - "Ca. M. massiliense" Pilliol et al. 2024
    - M. stadtmanae corrig. Miller & Wolin 1985

== See also ==
- List of Archaea genera
