= Pseudopeptidoglycan =

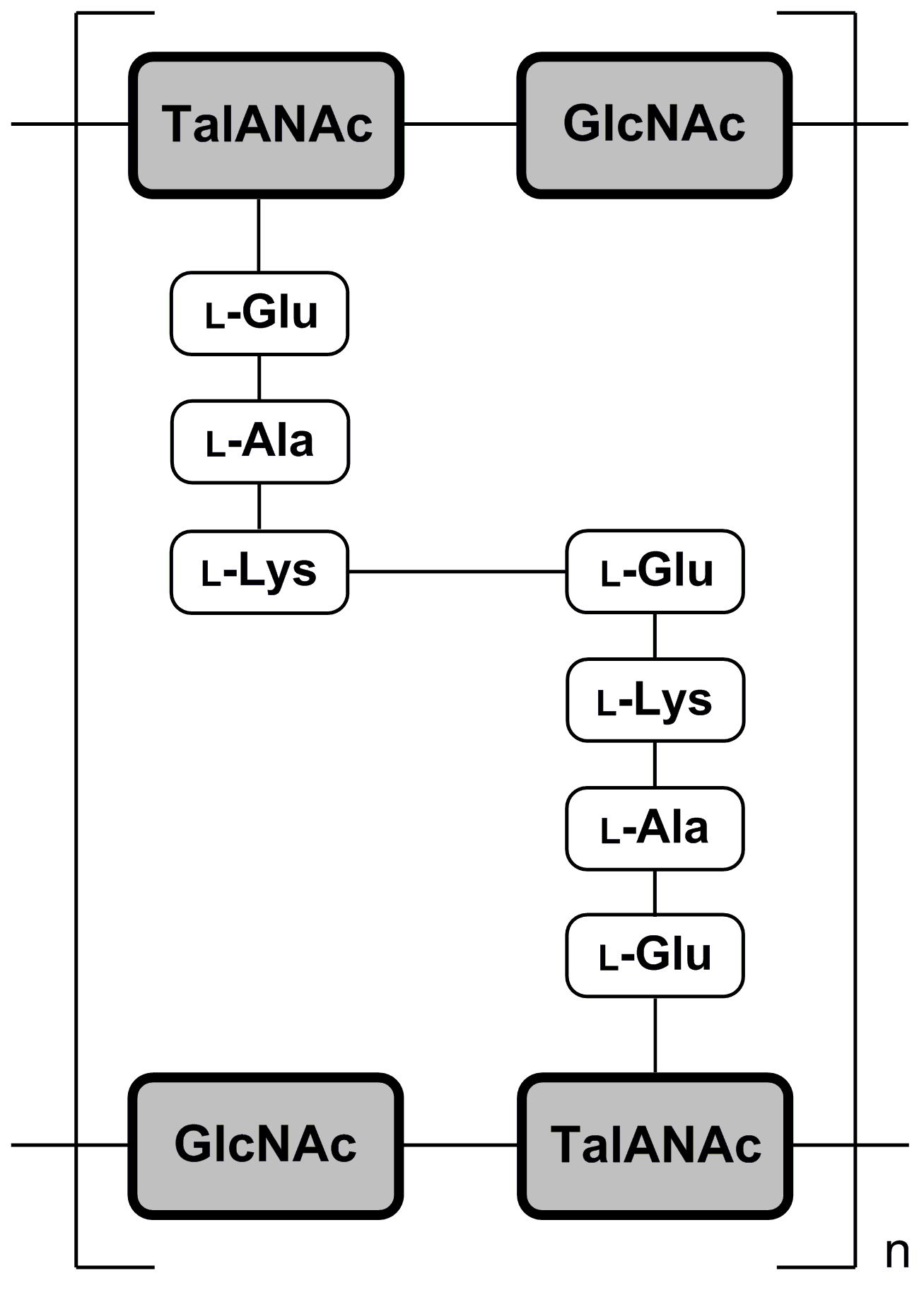
Structure schematic, showing sugar units and UDP-L-Glu-γ-L-Ala-ε-L-Lys-L-Ala peptide stem. Additional glutamic acid residue attached to the L-Lys residue via a γ bond not shown.

Pseudopeptidoglycan (also known as pseudomurein; PPG hereafter) is a major cell wall component of some Archaea that differs from bacterial peptidoglycan in chemical structure, but resembles bacterial peptidoglycan in function and physical structure. Pseudopeptidoglycan, in general, is only present in a few methanogenic archaea. The basic components are N-acetylglucosamine and N-acetyltalosaminuronic acid (bacterial peptidoglycan containing N-acetylmuramic acid instead), which are linked by β-1,3-glycosidic bonds.

Lysozyme, a host defense mechanism present in human secretions (e.g. saliva and tears) breaks β-1,4-glycosidic bonds to degrade peptidoglycan. However, because pseudopeptidoglycan has β-1,3-glycosidic bonds, lysozyme is ineffective. It was thought from these large differences in cell wall chemistry that archaeal cell walls and bacterial cell walls have not evolved from a common ancestor but are only the result of a convergent evolution, but recent structural work has revealed deeper homology.

No archaeal enzymes are known that cleave the β-1,3-glycosidic bonds in pseudopeptidoglycan, but it can be degraded by pseudomurein endoisopeptidase encoded by two prophages. The pseudomurein endoisopeptidases function by cleaving the peptide links between adjacent pseudopeptidoglycan strands.

== Structure ==
Pseudopeptidoglycan is composed of two sugars, N-acetylglucosamine and N-acetyltalosaminuronic acid. These sugars are made of different amino acids, and the peptide cross-links within pseudopeptidoglycan are formed with different amino acids. The peptide bond is formed between the lysine of a N-acetyltalosaminuronic acid and a glutamine of a parallel N-acetyltalosaminuronic acid. Pseudopeptidoglycan, like peptidoglycan in bacteria, forms a mesh-like layer outside of the plasma membrane of the archaea.

== Function ==
Only a few methanogenic archaea have cell walls composed of pseudopeptidoglycan. This component functions much like peptidoglycan in a bacterial cell. Pseudopeptidoglycan is used by the archaeal cell to determine its shape and provide structure to the cell. It is also used to protect the cell from undesired molecules or anything harmful in its environment.

== Biosynthesis ==
PPG is produced by enzymes of two gene clusters. Recent work on the peptide ligases show, surprisingly, a common origin with murein synthesis. The pathway is now known to include the orthologous-to-bacteria CarB, MurC/D (peptide ligase), MurG, MraY, UppP, UppS, and flippase presumably performing an analogous function, and two novel but conserved transmembrane proteins. GlmM and GlmU, which produce UDP-GlcNAc in bacteria, are also present with phosphoglucomutase (PGM). Half of the species also have MurT and GatD, known to perform cell wall modifications in bacteria. No orthologous cross-linking enzymes have been identified. Notably, "formation of the disaccharide moiety of the glycopeptide monomer occurs before the transfer to membrane protein by MraY", as opposed to after in bacteria. Further work would be needed to connect these information into a coherent pathway.

== Effects of different bacterial medicines on pseudopeptidoglycan ==
=== Lysozyme ===
Lysozyme is a natural defense mechanism in humans that has the ability to break down peptidoglycan in bacterial cells. It degrades the peptidoglycan by targeting the β-1,4-glycosidic bonds that connect the alternating amino sugars in which it is composed of. This degradation of the glycosidic bonds within peptidoglycan cause the sugars to separate and inhibit the structural integrity of the peptidoglycan and the bacteria.

Pseudopeptidoglycan, however, is composed of a different acidic amino sugar, which is N-acetyltalosaminuronic acid. This difference is the reason that it has β-1,3-glycosidic bonds (as opposed to the β-1,4-glycosidic bonds in bacteria). Lysozymes targets the linkage in peptidoglycan, and without that, becomes ineffective against pseudopeptidoglycan.

=== Penicillin ===
Penicillin is a group of antibiotics that have been effective against many bacterial infections. It attacks bacteria by targeting and inhibiting the transpeptidase that catalyzes the cross-linking of the amino sugars in peptidoglycan. However, pseudopeptidoglycan contains different amino sugars, and therefore, a different catalysis enzyme is used. The different amino acids cause antibiotics, that target cell walls like penicillin, to be ineffective against pseudopeptidoglycan.

== Taxonomic distribution ==
PPG is found in the archaeal orders of Methanobacteriales and Methanopyrales. Some genera under these orders are:

- Methanobacterium
- Methanobrevibacter
- Methanothermobacter
- Methanothermus
- Methanosphaera
- Methanopyrus

== See also ==
- Cell wall
- Methanochondroitin
- Peptidoglycan
