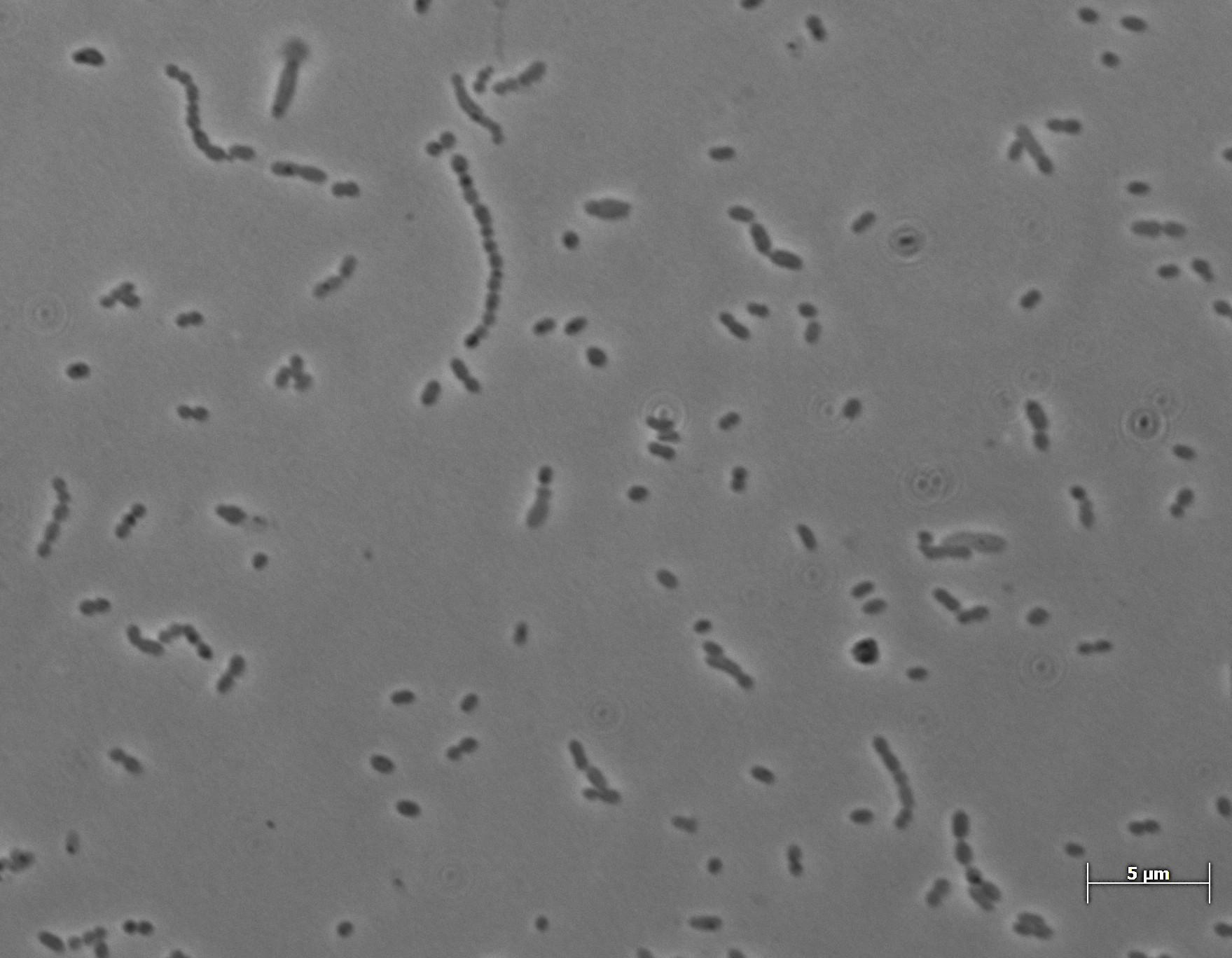
- Methanobrevibacter ruminantium, type species of the genus Methanobrevibacter (type strain M1, ATCC 35063; DSM 1093; JCM 13430), phase-contrast photo.

Scientific classification
- Domain: Archaea
- Kingdom: Methanobacteriati
- Phylum: Methanobacteriota
- Class: Methanobacteria
- Order: Methanobacteriales
- Family: Methanobacteriaceae
- Genus: Methanobrevibacter; Balch and Wolfe 1981

Type species
- Methanobrevibacter ruminantium (Smith & Hungate 1958) Balch & Wolfe 1981

Species
- See text

= Methanobrevibacter =

Genus of archaea

Methanobrevibacter is a genus of archaea in the family Methanobacteriaceae. The species within Methanobrevibacter genus are strictly anaerobic and produce methane through the reduction of carbon dioxide via hydrogen with some also able to utulize formate. Methanobrevibacter species exclusively inhabit digestive tract of various animals such as cattle, termites, and primates including humans. As part of cattle gut microbiome, Methanobrevibacter species responsible for about 20% of annual methane emission to the atmosphere.

== Nomenclature ==
The name Methanobrevibacter has Latin and Greek roots. Methanum is Latin for methane, brevi is Latin for short, and bacter is Greek for bar or rod. This word typically describes these bacteria which are short, rod shaped and produce methane.

Professional publications use the abbreviations M., Mbb., and Mbr., as in M. smithii, Mbb. smithii, and Mbr. smithii.

== Phylogeny ==
The currently accepted taxonomy is based on the List of Prokaryotic names with Standing in Nomenclature (LPSN) and National Center for Biotechnology Information (NCBI).

16S rRNA based LTP_07_2026

- Methanobrevibacter
  - - - M. arboriphilicum
      - M. cuticularis
    - - M. curvatus
      - M. filiformis
  - - M. acididurans
    - - - M. boviskoreani
        - M. wolinii
      - - - M. olleyae
          - M. ruminantium
        - - M. woesei
          - - - M. intestini
              - M. smithii
            - - M. thaueri
              - - M. gottschalkii
                - M. millerae

53 marker proteins based GTDB 11-RS232

- - - "Methanacia filiformis" (Leadbetter, Crosby & Breznak 1998) Protasov & Brune 2023
    - - "Methanoflexus"
        - "M. curvatus" (Leadbetter & Breznak 1997) Protasov & Brune 2023
        - "Ca. M. mossambicus" Protasov & Brune 2023
      - "Methanovirga"
        - - "M. aequatorialis" Protasov & Brune 2023
          - "M. basalitermitum" Protasov & Brune 2023
        - - "Ca. M. meridionalis" Protasov & Brune 2023
          - - "M. australis" Protasov & Brune 2023
            - "Ca. M. procula" Protasov & Brune 2023
  - - - "Methanorudis spinitermitis" Protasov & Brune 2023
      - - "Methanobaculum cuticulare" (Leadbetter & Breznak 1997) Protasov & Brune 2023
        - - "Methanobinarius"
            - "M. arboriphilicus" corrig. (Zeikus & Henning 1975) Protasov & Brune 2023
            - "Ca. M. endosymbioticus" Protasov & Brune 2023
    - - - - Methanobrevibacter_A
            Methanobrevibacter acididurans Savant et al. 2002
        - - "Methanarmilla"
            - "M. boviskoreani" (Lee et al. 2013) Protasov & Brune 2023
            - "M. wolinii" (Miller & Lin 2002) Protasov & Brune 2023
          - Methanobrevibacter
            - M. olleyae Rea et al. 2007
            - M. ruminantium (Smith & Hungate 1958) Balch & Wolfe 1981
      - - "Methanocatella"
          - "M. woesei" (Miller & Lin 2002) Protasov & Brune 2023
          - - - Methanobrevibacter intestini Weinberger et al. 2025
              - "M. smithii" (Balch & Wolfe 1981) Protasov & Brune 2023
            - - "M. oralis" (Ferrari et al. 1995) Protasov & Brune 2023
              - - "M. millerae" (Rea et al. 2007) Protasov & Brune 2023
                - - "M. gottschalkii" (Miller & Lin 2002) Protasov & Brune 2023
                  - "M. thaueri" (Miller & Lin 2002) Protasov & Brune 2023

The GTDB tree shows named species represented in R11-RS232; accession-based placeholder species are omitted. Quoted genus names are genome-based names used by GTDB and are not validly published replacements for Methanobrevibacter under the ICNP. The suffix "_A" is a GTDB cluster identifier.

Unassigned species:

- "Ca. M. cononymphae" Kaneko et al. 2024
- "M. massiliense" Huynh et al. 2015

== See also ==
- List of Archaea genera
