= Hydrogenotroph =

Organism that metabolizes molecular hydrogen

Hydrogenotrophs are organisms that are able to metabolize molecular hydrogen as a source of energy.

An example of hydrogenotrophy is performed by carbon dioxide-reducing organisms which use CO_{2} and H_{2} to produce methane (CH_{4}) by the following reaction:

- CO_{2} + 4H_{2} → CH_{4} + 2H_{2}O

Other hydrogenotrophic metabolic pathways include acetogenesis, sulfate reduction, and other hydrogen-oxidizing bacteria. Those that metabolize methane are called methanotrophs. Hydrogenotrophs belong to a group of organisms known as methanogens, organisms that carry out anaerobic processes that are responsible for the production of methane through carbon dioxide reduction. Methanogens also include a group of organisms called methylotrophs, organisms that can use single-carbon molecules or molecules with no carbon-carbon bonds.

== Background Information ==
Hydrogenotrophic bacteria were first experimented with by NASA in the 1960s in order to find a replenishable food source. Hydrogenotrophic bacteria have been found to have a high protein and carbohydrate content and have been a guiding principle in developing sustainable agricultural methods. Experimentation has revealed that hydrogenotrophic bacteria can convert carbon dioxide into food more rapidly than plants, making them an efficient and sustainable alternative to implement into plant-based high-protein diets and as a substitute in products that use plant extracts and oils.

In September 2022, finnish biotech startup Solar Foods received its first food regulatory approval from the Singapore Food Agency (SFA) for a protein supplement (Solein) derived from hydrogenotrophic microorganisms, and has since started production in a commercial-scale facility.

Hydrogenotrophs are commonly found in the human gut, along with other fermentative bacteria which live in symbiosis with one another. They are also found in soils and in sediments of freshwater and marine ecosystems around the world.

== See also ==
- Single cell protein
