= Methanobacteriaceae =

Scientific classification
- Domain: Archaea
- Kingdom: Methanobacteriati
- Phylum: Methanobacteriota
- Class: Methanobacteria
- Order: Methanobacteriales
- Family: Methanobacteriaceae; Barker 1956

Genera
- "Methanacia"; "Methanarmilla"; Methanobacterium; "Methanobaculum"; "Methanobinarius"; Methanobrevibacter; "Methanocatella"; "Methanoflexus"; "Methanorudis"; Methanosphaera; "Methanovirga"

Family of archaea

Methanobacteriaceae are a family of archaeans in the order Methanobacteriales.

== Phylogeny ==
The currently accepted taxonomy is based on the List of Prokaryotic names with Standing in Nomenclature (LPSN) and National Center for Biotechnology Information (NCBI).

16S rRNA based LTP_07_2026

- Methanobacteriaceae
  - Methanothermobacter~
  - - Methanothermobacter
    - - Methanobacterium
      - - Methanobacterium~1
        - - Methanosphaera
          - Methanobrevibacter

53 marker proteins based GTDB 11-RS232

- - - DSM‑23052
      "Methanothermobacter_A"
  - - Methanothermobacteraceae
      Methanothermobacter
    - Methanobacteriaceae
      - - - "Methanacia"
          - - "Methanoflexus"
            - "Methanovirga"
        - - - "Methanorudis"
            - - "Methanobaculum"
              - "Methanobinarius"
          - - "Methanocatella"
            - - Methanobrevibacter_A
              - - Methanarmilla
                - Methanobrevibacter
      - - Methanobacterium_E & F
        - - Methanobacterium_D
          - - Methanosphaera
            - Methanobacterium

== See also ==
- List of Archaea genera
