= Methanobacteriales =

Scientific classification
- Domain: Archaea
- Kingdom: Methanobacteriati
- Phylum: Methanobacteriota
- Class: Methanobacteria
- Order: Methanobacteriales; Balch and Wolfe 1981

Families
- Methanobacteriaceae; Methanothermaceae; Methanothermobacteraceae

Order of archaea

Methanobacteriales is an order of archaeans in the class Methanobacteria. Species within this order differ from other methanogens in that they can use fewer catabolic substrates and have distinct morphological characteristics, lipid compositions, and RNA sequences. Their cell walls are composed of pseudomurein. Most species are Gram-positive with rod-shaped bodies and some can form long filaments. Most of them use formate to reduce carbon dioxide, but those of the genus Methanosphaera use hydrogen to reduce methanol to methane.

== Phylogeny ==
The currently accepted taxonomy is based on the List of Prokaryotic names with Standing in Nomenclature (LPSN) and National Center for Biotechnology Information (NCBI).

16S rRNA based LTP_07_2026

- Methanobacteriales
  - Methanothermaceae
    Methanothermus
  - Methanobacteriaceae
    - Methanothermobacter~
    - - Methanothermobacter
      - - Methanobacterium
        - - Methanobacterium~1
          - - Methanosphaera
            - Methanobrevibacter

53 marker proteins based GTDB 11-RS232

- - DSM‑2088
    - Methanothermaceae
      Methanothermus
  - Methanobacteriales
    - - DSM‑23052
        "Methanothermobacter_A"
    - - Methanothermobacteraceae
        Methanothermobacter
      - Methanobacteriaceae
        - - - "Methanacia"
            - - "Methanoflexus"
              - "Methanovirga"
          - - - "Methanorudis"
              - - "Methanobaculum"
                - "Methanobinarius"
            - - "Methanocatella"
              - - Methanobrevibacter_A
                - - "Methanarmilla"
                  - Methanobrevibacter
        - - "Methanobacterium_E" & F
          - - "Methanobacterium_D"
            - - Methanosphaera
              - Methanobacterium

== See also ==
- List of Archaea genera
