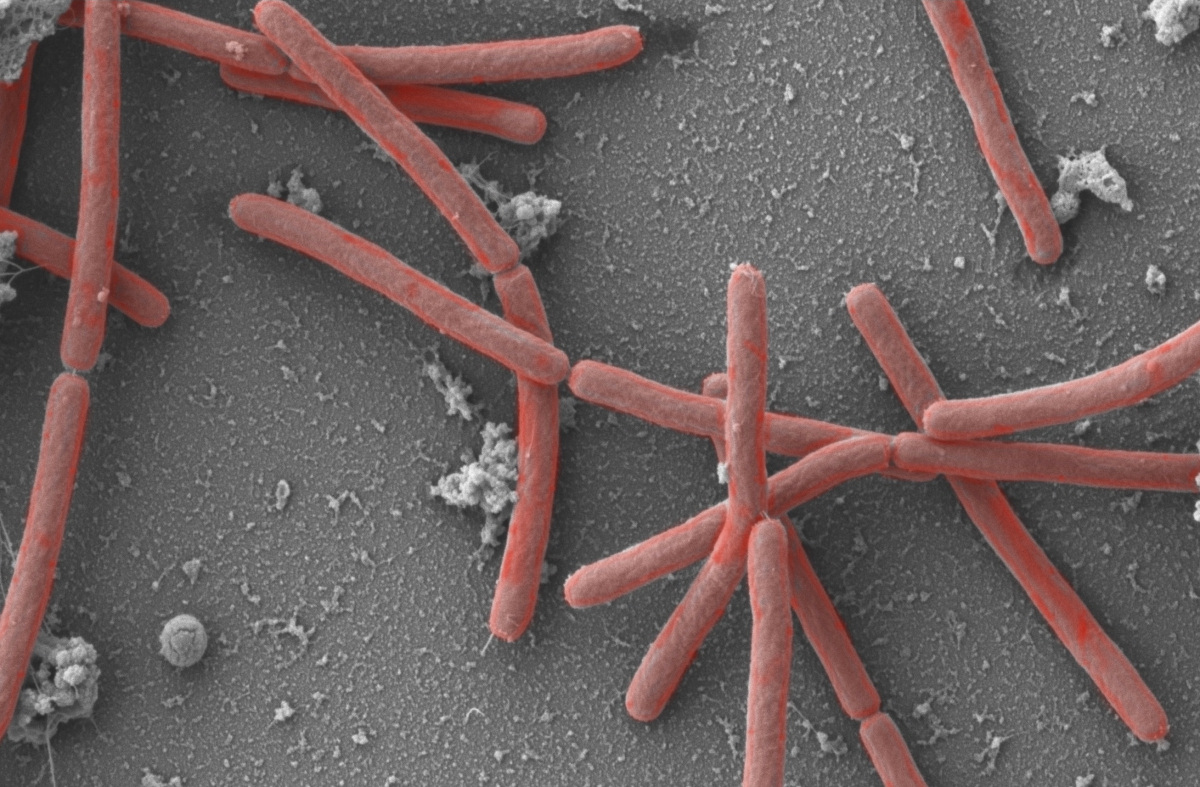
- Methanothermobacter thermautotrophicus

Scientific classification
- Domain: Archaea
- Kingdom: Methanobacteriati
- Phylum: Methanobacteriota
- Class: Methanobacteria; Boone 2002

Orders
- Methanobacteriales

Synonyms
- Archaeobacteria Murray 1988; "Methanobacteriia" Oren, Parte & Garrity 2016; Methanothermea Cavalier-Smith 2002

= Methanobacteria =

Class of archaea

Methanobacteria is a class of archaeans in the kingdom "Methanobacteriati". and National Center for Biotechnology Information (NCBI). Several of the classes of the "Methanobacteriati" are methanogens and the Methanobacteria are one of these classes.

== Applications ==
Methanobacteria can be used in biomass conversion as well as energy production through Anaerobic digestion (AD) process. Microbial community is used in Anaerobic digestion (AD) to convert organic wastes into clean energy by reducing chemical and biological oxygen demand in the wastes. Solid-state anaerobic digestion, which contains six genera of methanogens including Methanobacteria, can ferment rice straw and then produce methane. Since conventional treatment is burning rice straw in field, applying Methanobacteria to waste disposal process can reduce the air pollution caused by straw burning and also alleviate energy shortage problem, especially in rural areas. During biomethanation process, insoluble organic material and higher molecular mass compounds will first be transformed into simple carbon compounds. These break-down products will then be fermented to acetic acid, hydrogen and carbon dioxide. Eventually, the acetic acids can be fermented by different methanogenic archaea to produce methane.

The product of Methanobacteria in human body can be used to test diseases. Methane in breath is produced by anaerobic methanobacteria in human colon as a metabolic end product. The status of Methanobacteria product detected in breath tests can be used to evaluate patients' particular gastrointestinal disorders. It is shown that the proportion of breath methane excreters among patients with colorectal cancer is much higher than that of normal people. However, methane breath status might be influenced by variable factors existing in diagnostic procedures, limiting the usage of breath methane test in cancer diagnosis.

== See also ==
- List of Archaea genera
