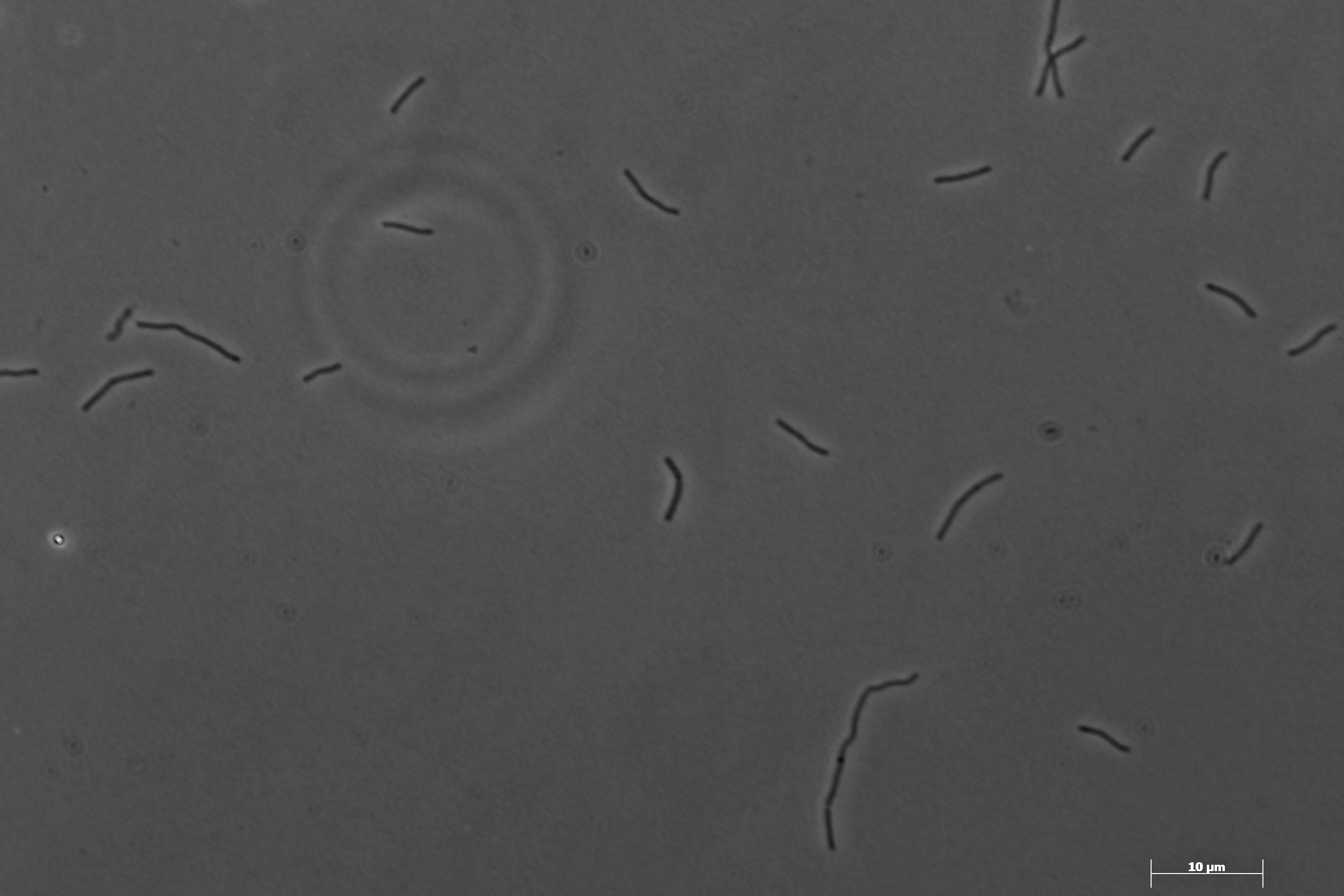
- Phase-contrast photo of Methanobacterium formicicum strain MF (DSM 1535)

Scientific classification
- Domain: Archaea
- Kingdom: Methanobacteriati
- Phylum: Methanobacteriota; Garrity & Holt 2023

Subgroups
- Archaeoglobi; Halobacteria; Methanobacteria; Methanococci; "Methanofastidiosia"; "Methanoliparia"; Methanonatronarchaeia; Methanopyri; Methanosarcinia; Thermococci; Thermoplasmata; Incertae sedis; "Methanoflorentales"; Methanomicrobiales; "Methanophagales"; "Syntropharchaeales"; "Ca. Thalassarchaea"

= Methanobacteriota =

Phylum of archaea

Methanobacteriota is a phylum in the domain Archaea. The phylum was introduced to prokaryotic nomenclature in 2023.
