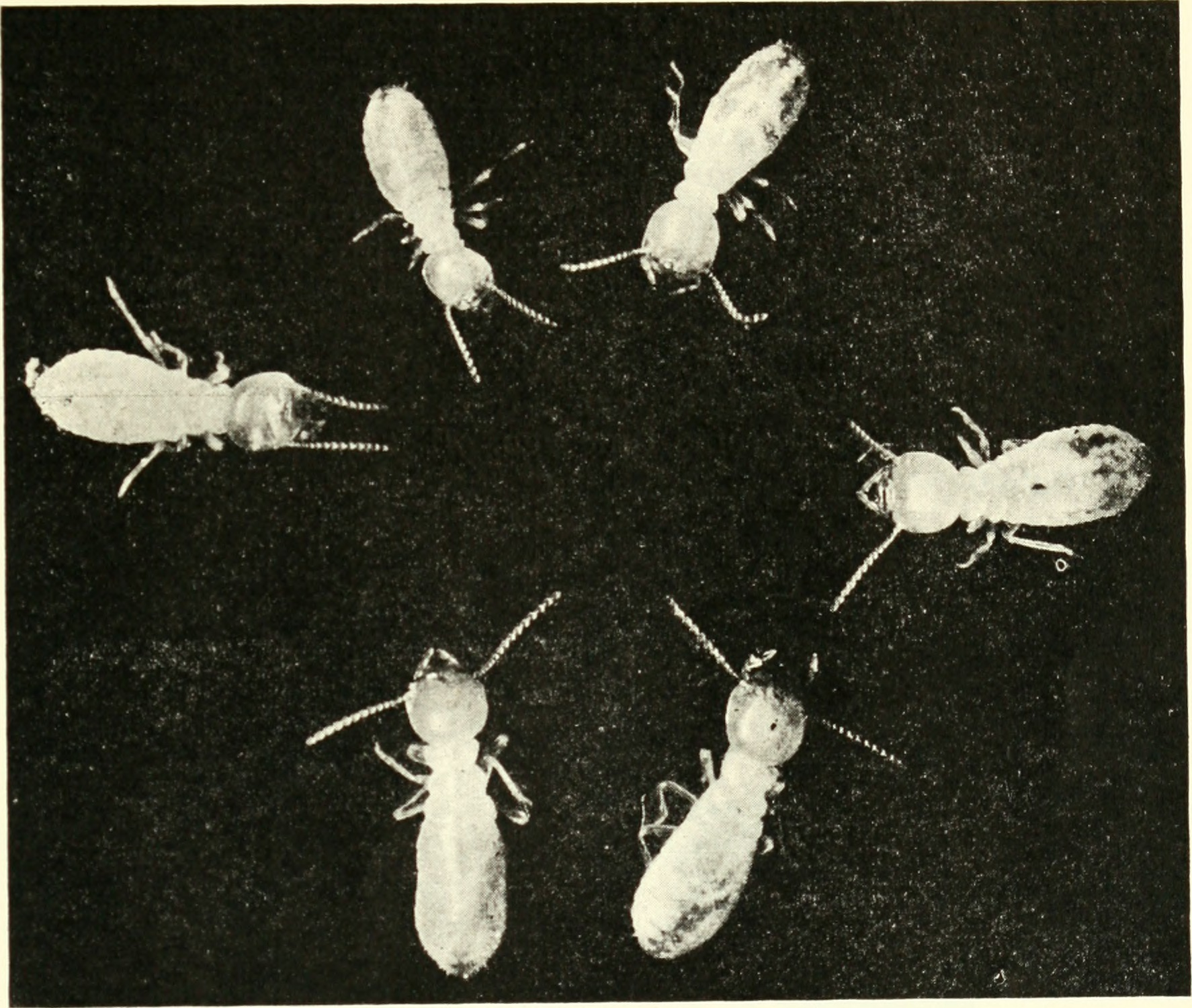
- Workers

Scientific classification
- Domain: Eukaryota
- Kingdom: Animalia
- Phylum: Arthropoda
- Class: Insecta
- Order: Blattodea
- Infraorder: Isoptera
- Family: Heterotermitidae
- Genus: Reticulitermes
- Species: R. tibialis

Binomial name
- Reticulitermes tibialis Banks in Banks and Snyder, 1920

= Reticulitermes tibialis =

Species of termite

Reticulitermes tibialis, the arid-land subterranean termite, is a species of termite in the family Heterotermitidae. It is found in the United States, mostly in the western half, occurring in deserts, prairies and other dry locations.

== Description ==
Subterranean termites in the genus Reticulitermes are difficult to distinguish morphologically. Other similar species found in much the same geographical area are Reticulitermes flavipes, Reticulitermes virginicus and Reticulitermes hageni. Reticulitermes tibialis tends to live in drier habitats and can be distinguished from the other species by gene sequencing. Winged adults of this species are about 10 mm (0.4 in) in length. They have a broad prothorax and are black, with black legs.

== Distribution and habitat ==
Reticulitermes tibialis has a wider distribution in North America than other members of its genus. Its range includes most of the western and north central parts of the United States as far east as Illinois. In the east, it coexists with R. flavipes, R. virginicus and R. hageni, and south of Lake Michigan, its range overlaps with that of Reticulitermes arenincola. It mostly occurs in deserts and arid locations such as prairies with hard-packed or alkaline soil, canyons, river valleys and among sand dunes. It occurs at altitudes of up to 2,200 m (7,000 ft) and more in the Rocky Mountains. As well as wooden structures, it attacks logs and fallen timber, and in deserts feeds on creosote and greasewood bushes.

== Life cycle ==
Winged reproductives (alates) appear above ground in the fall, winter or spring, depending on location. After a short flight they shed their wings, and a female will search for a crevice or other suitable underground nesting site and be joined there by a male. Having mated and excavated a chamber, the female starts laying eggs. The first batch of eggs hatch into larvae which develop into workers; these enlarge the nest, search for food and carry it back to the nest. As the number of termites in the colony expands, some workers further develop into soldiers; in well-established colonies, there may be hundreds of thousands of individual insects. Alates are not produced until the colony has been established for several years. In large colonies, it is possible for workers to develop into non-winged reproductives which lay eggs to supplement the queen's effort, or which can replace her should she die.

Because they tend to inhabit arid areas with low human populations, this species does relatively little damage to man-made structures as compared to other Reticulitermes species.
