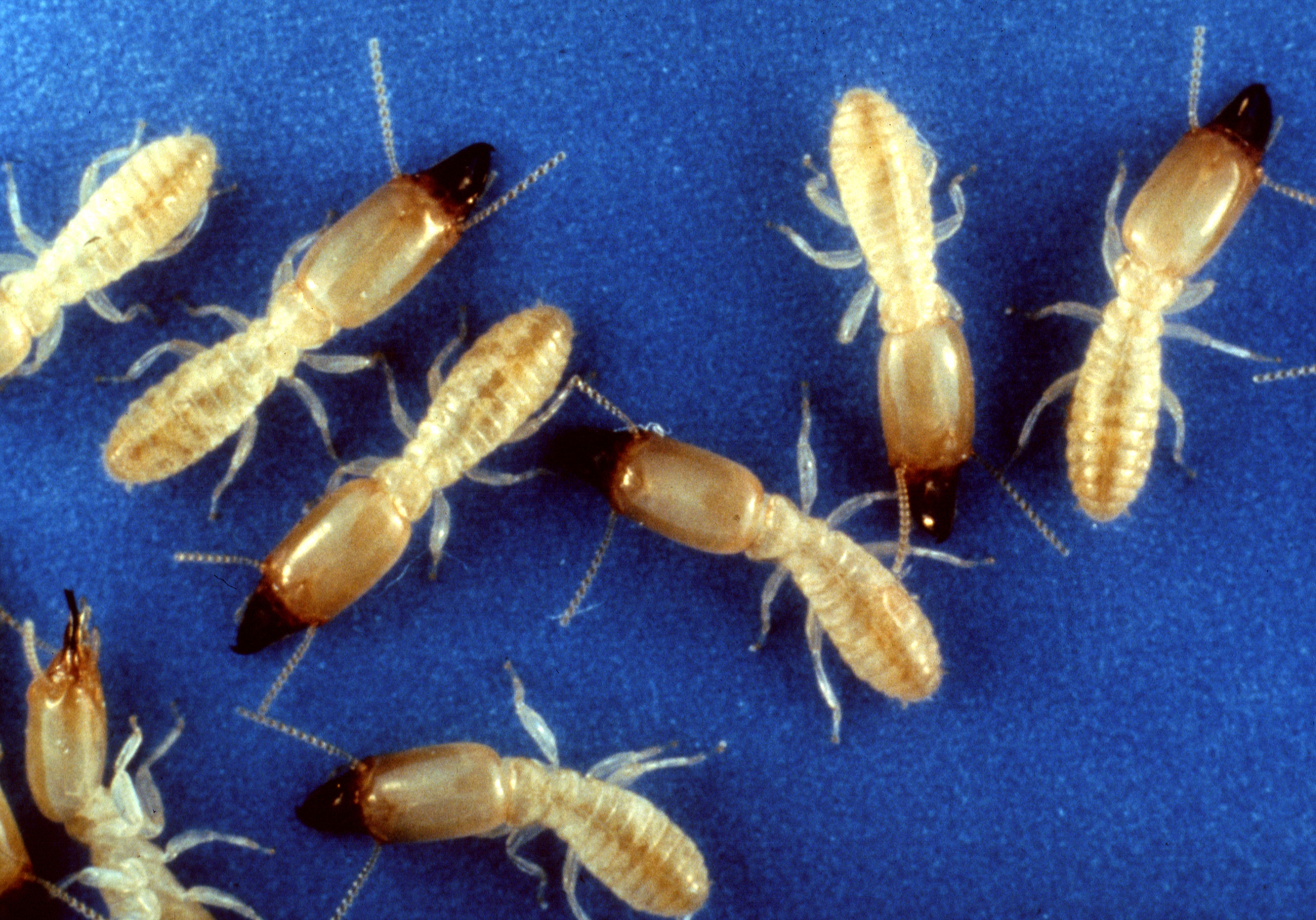

Scientific classification
- Kingdom: Animalia
- Phylum: Arthropoda
- Clade: Pancrustacea
- Class: Insecta
- Order: Blattodea
- Infraorder: Isoptera
- Family: Heterotermitidae
- Genus: Reticulitermes
- Species: R. flavipes

Binomial name
- Reticulitermes flavipes (Kollar, 1837)

Synonyms
- Termes flavipes Kollar; Reticulitermes santonensis Feytaud

= Reticulitermes flavipes =

Species of insect found in North America

Reticulitermes flavipes, the eastern subterranean termite, is the most common termite found in North America. These termites are the most economically important wood destroying insects in the United States and are classified as pests. They feed on cellulose material such as the structural wood in buildings, wooden fixtures, paper, books, and cotton. A mature colony can range from 20,000 workers to as high as 5 million workers and the primary queen of the colony lays 5,000 to 10,000 eggs per year to add to this total.

== Distribution ==
The eastern subterranean termite (R. flavipes) is the most widely distributed Reticulitermes species. It occurs throughout the eastern United States, including Texas, and can be found as far north as southern Ontario. In 2006, R. flavipes was also recorded in Oregon, on the West coast of the United States.

Reticulitermes santonensis in France is now understood to be a synonym of R. flavipes. The species is now believed to originate in the southeastern United States and to be exotic or invasive in southern Canada, Europe (France, Germany, Italy, the Netherlands), South America (Uruguay, Chile), and the Bahamas.

== Description ==
Eastern subterranean termites, like other social insects, share resources and divide labor based on a caste system. They live in loosely associated societies called colonies which are composed of both males and females. The termites in the colony are generally organized into the worker caste, the soldier caste, and the reproductive caste.

=== Worker caste ===
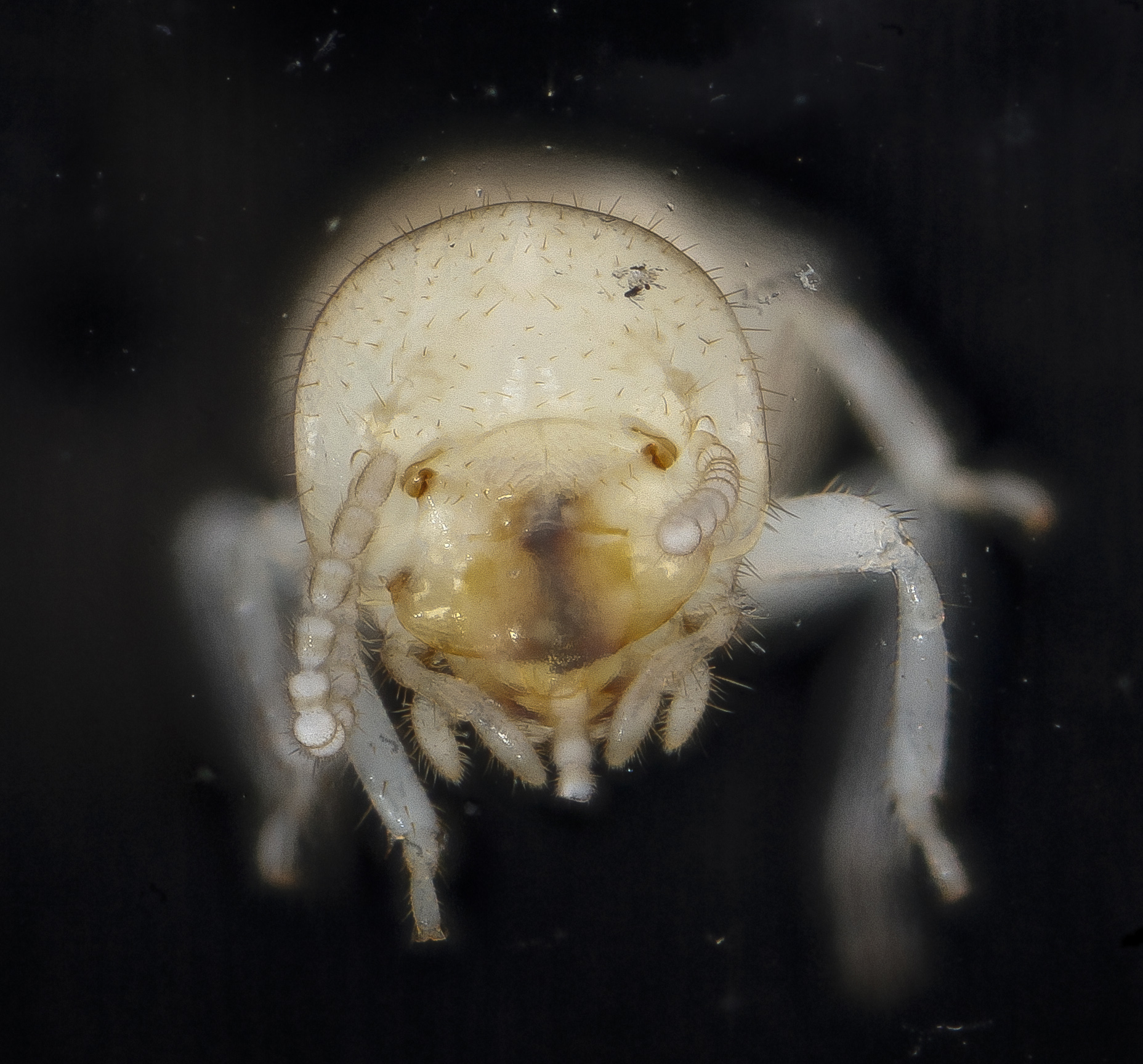
Worker

Workers are about 3 mm long and are blind, wingless, soft-bodied, creamy white to grayish-white with a round head. They make up the majority of the termites that actually eat the wood. They are sterile and forage for food and water, construct and repair shelter tubes, feed and groom other termites, care for eggs and young, and participate in colony defense.

=== Soldier caste ===
Soldier termites are also wingless and resemble workers except that they have a large, rectangular, yellowish-brown head with long black mandibles. The soldiers’ primary function is colony defense and the mandibles are mainly used for crushing enemy ants which may invade the colony. Additionally, R. flavipes has a fontanelle (frontal gland pore) on the forehead from which it secretes a blend of terpenoid compounds. These secretions are synthesised de novo and are also used to defend the colony from predators such as ants. The soldier caste only makes up 1 to 2% of the entire colony. The soldiers are not capable of feeding themselves and rely on the worker termites to provide them with regurgitated food.

Soldiers have been found to protect alates as they begin to leave the nest. Perhaps correspondingly, soldiers populations reach their highest in the Spring as temperatures increase.

=== Reproductive caste ===
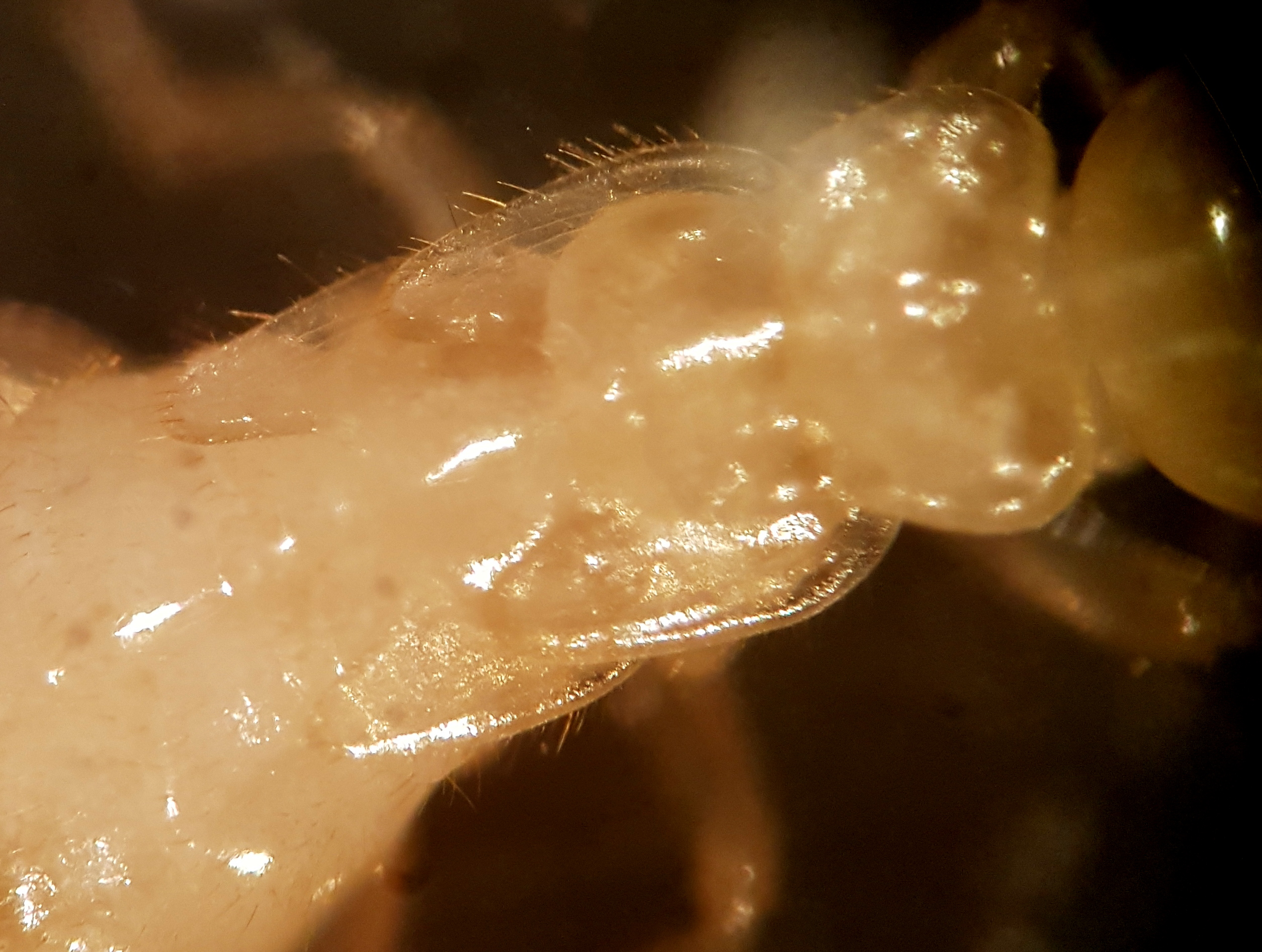
Wing buds of a nymph

Immature termites on the sexual, or reproductive, line are called nymphs and can be distinguished from workers by the presence of wing buds. Under natural conditions, the work that they do in the nest is negligible compared to that done by workers. They can feed themselves, but there is debate over how long (over how many instars) they retain this ability.

Alates (from the Latin ālātus, "having wings") are winged, sexually mature adults that are capable of dispersal and outbreeding. In R. flavipes, they are 8.5-10mm in length to the tips of their wings and have compound eyes, ocelli, and a dark brown to black fully sclerotized cuticle. As the species name suggests (flāvī, "yellow" + pēs, "foot"), the tarsi are yellowish. To distinguish R. flavipes from similar species (at least in the United States), the position of the ocelli can be used: looking at the head from the side, the distance between the ocellus and the nearest compound eye is at least as large as the diameter of the ocellus.

Alates always develop from nymphs, with the last nymphal stage characterised by particularly long wing buds. After leaving their nests and swarming, male and female alates pair, shed their wings, begin excavating a new nest, and mate. From this point onward, they are called kings and queens, dealates, or primary reproductives.

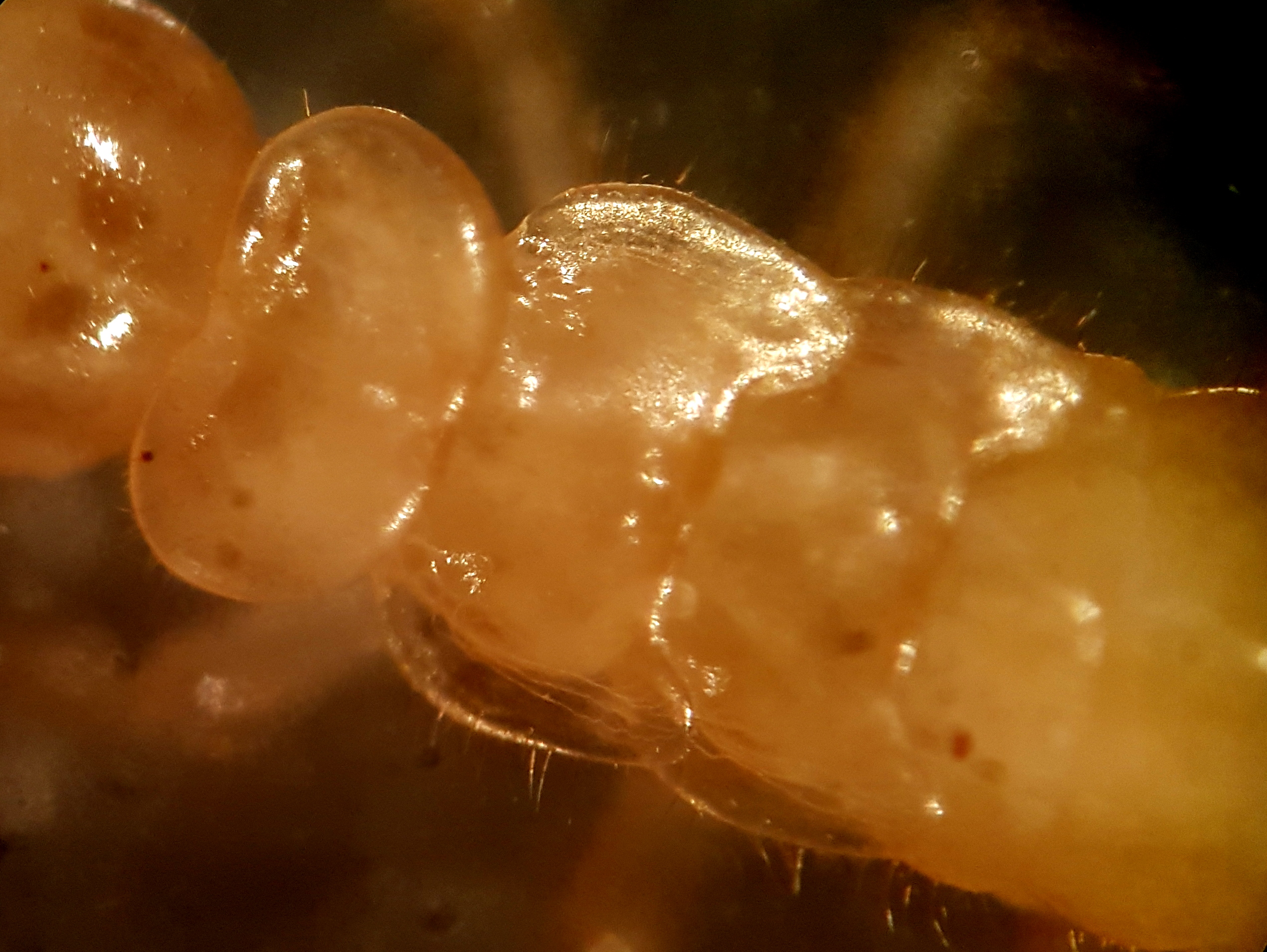
Wing buds of a brachypterous neotenic

Secondary reproductives, or neotenics, develop from either the reproductive line (brachypterous neotenics) or, in rare cases, the worker line (ergatoids). Ergatoids are the only members of the reproductive caste that have neither wing buds nor wings. Like workers, soldiers, and nymphs, they are eyeless. Ergatoids are seldom found in nature.

Brachypterous neotenics, which are common in the French population of R. flavipes (formerly R. santonensis), and possibly other populations as well, develop from nymphs via a nymph-like pre-brachypterous neotenic stage. They can be distinguished from nymphs by their shorter wing buds (brachy-, "short" + -pterous, "having wings"), darker pigmentation, slight sclerotization, and longer abdomens. Like alates, brachypterous neotenics also have compound eyes and ocelli. Female neotenics lay eggs at a lower rate than queens, but when present in large numbers, they may play a significant role in the growth of the colony.

== Life cycle ==
R. flavipes are opportunistic, and a newly hatched termite can develop into any of a number of castes. At first, it becomes a worker termite and is most likely to remain one for its entire lifespan. Molting can change the worker into a pre-soldier and subsequently, a soldier. The soldier caste is a terminal stage which can no longer molt.

R. flavipes also molts into nymphs, which are the precursors of winged adult termites called alates which are sexually mature. Nymphal termites are non terminal and can revert to the worker stage. These reverted nymphs are called pseudergates. Nymphs and workers can also develop into secondary and tertiary neotenic reproductives respectively.

=== Behavior ===
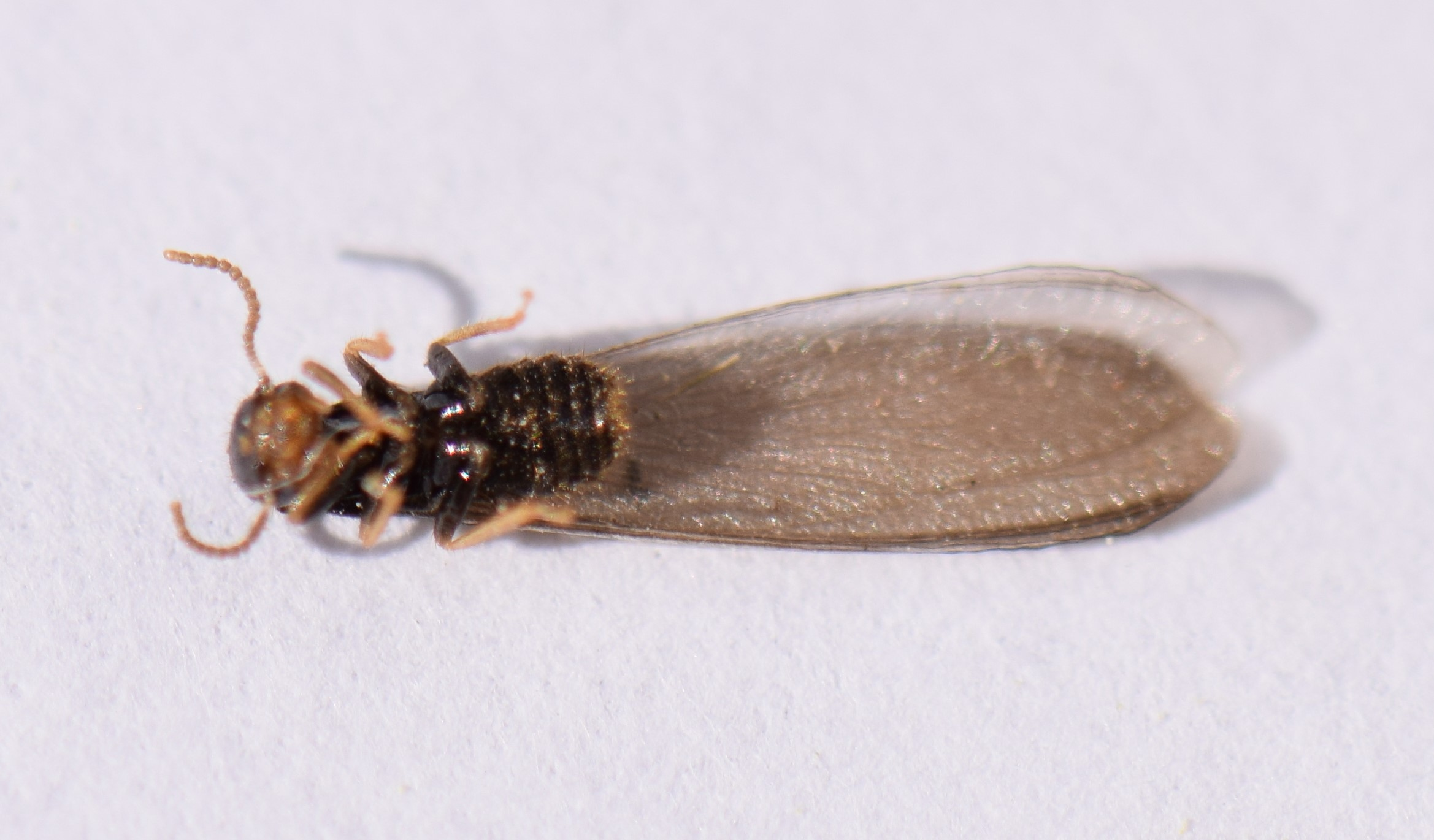
Ventral view of a R. flavipes swarmer

Because termites are social insects, they share many of their tasks. This can be seen throughout the caste system, where different castes take on different responsibilities for the betterment of the whole colony. R. flavipes cooperate in the rearing of young and also share their resources with the nest.

Swarming is the sudden, dramatic appearance of R. flavipes alates in the daytime from February to April. After this behavior male and female alates lose their wings, pair up, and form new colonies.

R. flavipes is mobile throughout its life and no permanent central nest area exists. Therefore, all termite castes can be found in any of the different sites occupied by a colony. Their activity is determined by food, moisture and temperature, and movement is usually driven by one of these necessities. Termites feed on anything made of or containing cellulose, but can tunnel into non-cellulose containing material to gain access to their destination. This behavior can be destructive to human activities.

== Gut microbiota ==
=== Flagellates ===
==== Discovery ====
The first person to observe and formally describe symbiotic flagellates in R. flavipes was the American paleontologist Joseph Leidy. In 1877, he reported his findings to the Academy of Natural Sciences of Philadelphia, describing three new species which he mistakenly took to be parasitic ciliates: Trichonympha agilis, Pyrsonympha vertens, and Dinenympha gracilis.

Prof. LEIDY remarked that in seeking small animals beneath stones and fragments of wood in our forests, observing the very common White Ant, Termes flavipes, he noticed that the intestine of the insect, seen in the translucent abdomen, was distended with brown matter. Feeling curious to learn the exact nature of this matter, he was surprised to find that it consisted largely of infusorial and other parasites, mingled with minute particles of decayed wood. In many instances the parasites are so numerous as to make up the greater portion of the bulk of the intestinal pulp. Every individual he had examined, of workers, soldiers, and winged forms, was infested with the parasites, which may be estimated by millions.

— Proceedings of the Academy of Natural Sciences of Philadelphia (1877)

==== Species present in Reticulitermes flavipes ====
Flagellates from a Reticulitermes flavipes gut

So far, least 9 genera and 11 species of symbiotic flagellate have been found in the R. flavipes hindgut:

- Dinenympha fimbriata Kirby, 1924
- Dinenympha gracilis Leidy, 1877
- Holomastigotes elongatum Grassi, 1892
- Microjoenia fallax (Duboscq & Grassé, 1928)
- Monocercomonas sp. Grassi, 1879
- Pyrsonympha major Powell, 1928
- Pyrsonympha vertens Leidy, 1877
- Spironympha kofoidi Koidzumi, 1917
- Spirotrichonympha flagellata (Grassi, 1892)
- Trichomitus trypanoides (Duboscq & Grassé, 1924)
- Trichonympha agilis Leidy, 1877

A 2003 study that focused on oxymonad flagellates found evidence of at least one additional undescribed Dinenympha species. They also found what they believe is an undescribed "second" Pyrsonympha species in addition to P. vertens. The authors question whether P. major, which was first described in Reticulitermes hesperus, is truly found in R. flavipes and consider it a case of mistaken identity.

==== Role in digestion ====
Flagellates are a feature of all termite families except Termitidae, the so-called "higher termites". They are found exclusively in the hindgut, especially the paunch, an enlarged section of the hindgut with an anaerobic interior that serves as a fermenter. In R. flavipes, wood eaten by the termite is first broken up with the mandibles, treated with host endoglucanases from the salivary glands, ground up into small particles in the gizzard, and then treated with additional host cellulases in the midgut, freeing glucose for immediate absorption. It then passes into the paunch, where flagellates take up the partly digested wood particles through endocytosis. The flagellates break lignocellulose (xylan or cellulose) down into simple sugars, which they ferment for their own energy needs, producing CO_{2}, H_{2}, and short-chain fatty acids such as acetate as waste products. The short-chain fatty acids (which are also produced by homoacetogenic gut bacteria from CO_{2} and H_{2}) can be directly absorbed by the termite host. The vast majority of digestion takes place in the paunch: almost all xylanase activity, just over one quarter of the endoglucanase activity, and almost two thirds of the exoglucanase activity in the R. flavipes digestive system is localised in the hindgut and attributed to gut flagellates.

Although this is an obligate symbiosis, newly hatched larvae do not have gut flagellates. These are acquired when the larvae are fed with flagellate-containing anal fluids from other members of the colony (proctodeal trophallaxis). Proctodeal trophallaxis is also used to replenish flagellates and other gut symbionts after each moult.

=== Bacteria ===
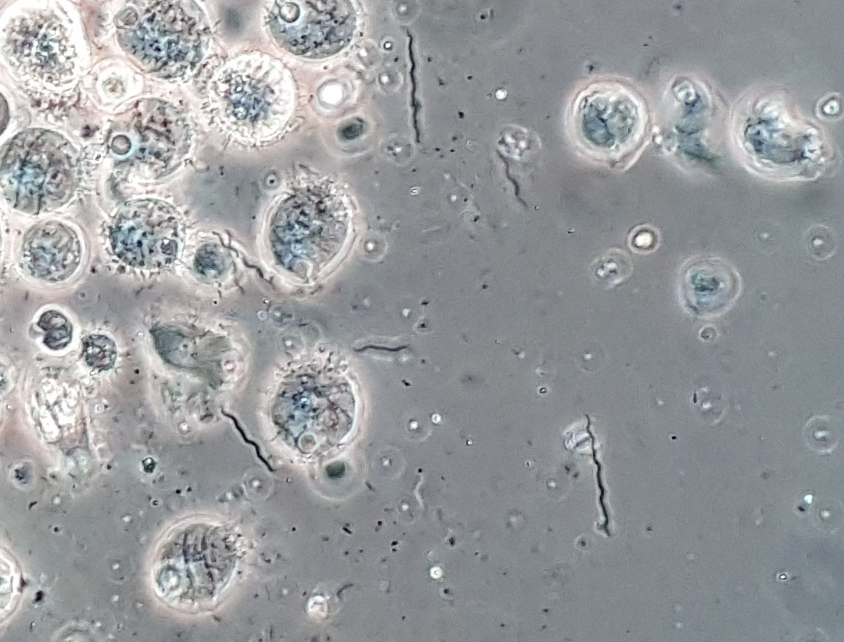
Spirochaetes and flagellates from a R. flavipes gut

Most bacterial species in the termite gut are difficult or impossible to culture, so methods like 16S ribosomal RNA sequencing are used to identify which groups are present. One such analysis of R. flavipes worker guts uncovered representatives of the Endomicrobia (Elusimicrobiota), Actinomycetota, Pseudomonadota, Bacillota, Bacteroidota, and Spirochaetota. The dominant bacterial taxon in the core gut microbiome is the genus Treponema (Spirochaetota), which accounted for approximately 32% of sequences in another 16S rRNA study. The same study identified Endomicrobia (phylum:Elusimicrobiota), which are predominant endosymbionts several protozoa in the termtie gut. Artificial defaunation of Reticulitermes species by force-feeding on starch or starvation leads to a loss of flagellates and, by association, these endosymbiotic Endomicrobia, and an increase in abundance of free-living relatives. A rare free-living member of this class, Endomicrobium proavitum, the first Endomicrobia species to be cultured and named, was isolated from sterile-filtered gut homogenates from defaunated (starch-fed) R. flavipes workers. It is believed to play a role in nitrogen fixation.

While some gut bacteria live free in the gut lumen or attached to the gut wall, many others live in close association with flagellates. These include uncultured members of Endomicrobia (Elusimicrobiota) and other taxa that live as cytoplasmic symbionts, as well as epibiotic symbionts that attach to the outer surface of cells. In R. flavipes, cytoplasmic symbionts have been identified in flagellates such as Trichonympha agilis (Hypermastigida) and Pyrsonympha vertens (Oxymonadida). The latter is also characterised by spirochaete epibiotic symbionts. In other termite species, members of the spirochaete genus Treponema have been identified as endo- and ectosymbionts of flagellates: similar associations may explain Treponema's dominance in the R. flavipes gut.

Disruption of the gut microbiota using agents like antibiotics or boric acid, a common agent used in preventative treatment, have been shown to cause irrecoverable damage to digestion and lead to the rise of opportunistic pathogens.

=== Archaea ===
Archaea isolated from the R. flavipes hindgut include the H_{2}- and CO_{2}-utilizing methanogens Methanobrevibacter cuticularis and curvatus. These two species are believed to be the dominant methanogens in R. flavipes and are found in the peripheral, microxic region of the hindgut, on or in close proximity to the gut wall, where they are sometimes attached to filamentous prokaryotes.

=== Caste-specific differences ===
Although there is a core microbiome shared among castes and colonies, the alate caste gut is characterised by a significantly lower abundances of bacteria in the genus Treponema (Spirochaetota) and the class Endomicrobia (Elusimicrobia) compared to workers and soldiers. Flagellates in the class Parabasalia and the order Oxymonadida are also significantly less abundant in the alate gut, with the latter significantly reduced in dealates as well.

== Human impact ==
Along with Reticulitermes virginica, R. flavipes is responsible for 80% of the $2.2 billion spent annually in the United States on termite control. Termites feed on wood cellulose, meaning that their presence in human made structures often goes unnoticed for lengthy periods of time. A termite infested timber will appear structurally sound from the outside, while inside it will have a honeycombed appearance. To detect the presence of R. flavipes the observer can test the integrity of the wood by tapping it with a screwdriver. If present, R. flavipes is found at, near or below ground level. Trim work, sub flooring, flooring, and the structural timbers are the areas of a building most susceptible to termite damage. The Eastern subterranean termite is considered a serious economic timber pest and it is estimated that in high activity areas more than 1 in 5 homes have been or will be attacked.

Termite control methods include: physical barriers, chemical treatments, and physical treatments (such as heat, freezing, electrocution and microwave irradiation).

Structural damage to buildings is not R. flavipes’ only impact on humans. Termites also play a critical role in the decomposition of organic matter in natural communities. Without termites, the accumulation of dead organic matter on the forest floor would become detrimental to integrity of that forest. The benefits provided by R. flavipes in terms of their contribution to environmental regulation may far outweigh the disadvantages they pose.

== See also ==
- Wood Destroying Insect Report
