= Andreas Brune =

- Born: March 1960 (age 66)
- Education: Philipps University of Marburg (Diploma) University of Tübingen (Dr. rer. nat.)
- Scientific career
- Fields: Microbiology, Microbiome, Physiology of microorganisms, Taxonomy
- Thesis: (1990)
- Doctoral advisor: Bernhard Schink
- Other academic advisors: John Breznak
- Website: https://www.mpi-marburg.mpg.de/654934/Andreas-Brune

Andreas Brune (born 1960) is a German microbiologist and microbial ecologist. He served as a Research Group Leader at the Max Planck Institute for Terrestrial Microbiology in Marburg and holds the position of Honorary Professor at the Philipps University of Marburg. His research focuses on the symbiotic digestion of lignocellulose by termite gut microbiota, the microecology of intestinal tracts, and the evolution of anaerobic microbial communities.

== Early life and education ==
Andreas Brune studied biology at the Philipps University of Marburg, receiving his Diplom in 1986. He completed his doctoral studies in microbiology at the University of Tübingen in 1990, earning his doctoral title (Dr. rer. nat.). His doctoral advisor was Prof. Dr. Bernhard Schink.

From 1991 to 1993, Brune worked as a postdoctoral researcher in the lab of John Breznak at Michigan State University in East Lansing, Michigan, USA. Upon returning to Germany, he joined the University of Konstanz as a research associate and group leader (1993–2003), where he completed his Habilitation in microbiology and microbial ecology in 2000.

In 2003, Brune was appointed Research Group Leader in the Department of Biogeochemistry at the Max Planck Institute for Terrestrial Microbiology in Marburg. He has also served as an Honorary Professor in the Biology Department of the Philipps University of Marburg since 2005. In 2017, he became into his role as a Department-Independent Research Group Leader at the Max Planck Institute for Terrestrial Microbiology.

== Career and research ==
Brune's research group, Insect Gut Microbiology and Symbiosis, studied the complex microbial ecosystems inside the intestinal tracts of termites and some other arthropods (cockroaches, scarab beetle larvae and millipedes). Termite guts function as tiny, highly efficient bioreactors that convert complex plant fiber and lignocellulose into fermentation products (primarily acetate) that fuel the host's metabolism.

Key scientific contributions of his research include:

- Termite gut microenvironment and oxygen dynamics: Using microelectrode technology, Brune's early work conducted at John Breznak's lab demonstrated that despite the strictly anaerobic nature of many hindgut processes (such as acetogenesis and methanogenesis), oxygen continuously diffuses into the microoxic periphery of the gut. There, it is rapidly consumed by the resident microbiota acting as an oxygen sink. Due to large large surface-to-volume ratios microoxic habitat in termite and in general arthropod hindgut was calculated to be about 40% of total volume of the gut.
- Discovery of the seventh order of methanogens: Brune and his team characterized "Candidatus Methanoplasmatales" (later assigned to Methanomassiliicoccales), establishing it as the seventh order of methanogenic archaea. They revealed its unique mode of energy metabolism, specifically, hydrogen-dependent methyl reduction.
- Evolution of the termite gut microbiome: His work has charted the co-evolution of termites and their intestinal flagellates and prokaryotes, showing how dietary transitions (such as wood-feeding to soil-feeding) and host phylogeny dictate gut community composition.

== Isolation and characterization of novel microorganisms ==
The Brune laboratory is widely recognized for pioneering targeted cultivation and isolation strategies for fastidious microorganisms inhabiting animal digestive tracts many of which were long considered "unculturable." By designing specialized anaerobic culture techniques and custom growth media tailored to insect hindgut microenvironments, his research group has isolated and taxonomically characterized numerous novel taxa across both the bacterial and archaeal domains.

Notable discoveries and pure-culture isolations from his laboratory include:

- Intestinal methanogens: Isolation and physiological characterization of intestinal methanogens, including Methanomonila shimae (Methanobacteriales), genus Methanolapillus and three new species from the genus Methanimicrococcus (Methanosarcinales), genus Methanorbis (Methanomicrobiales).
- Arthropod-associated spirochetes: Isolation and functional characterization of dominant hindgut spirochetes Breznakiella homolactica and description of a new family Breznakiellaceae.
- Elusimicrobiota representatives: Isolation and description of the first representative of Candidate phylum termite group 1 (TG1) characterized by extremely small cell size, Elusimicrobium minutum strain Pei191. Based on the isolate the phylum was renamed as Elusimicrobiota. Later a new representative from a sister class Endomicrobia, Endomicrobium proavitum, was isolated in Brune's lab from a termite Reticulitermes santonensis.

These isolation successes have provided crucial reference strains that allow researchers to validate metagenomic predictions through direct physiological and biochemical experimentation.
