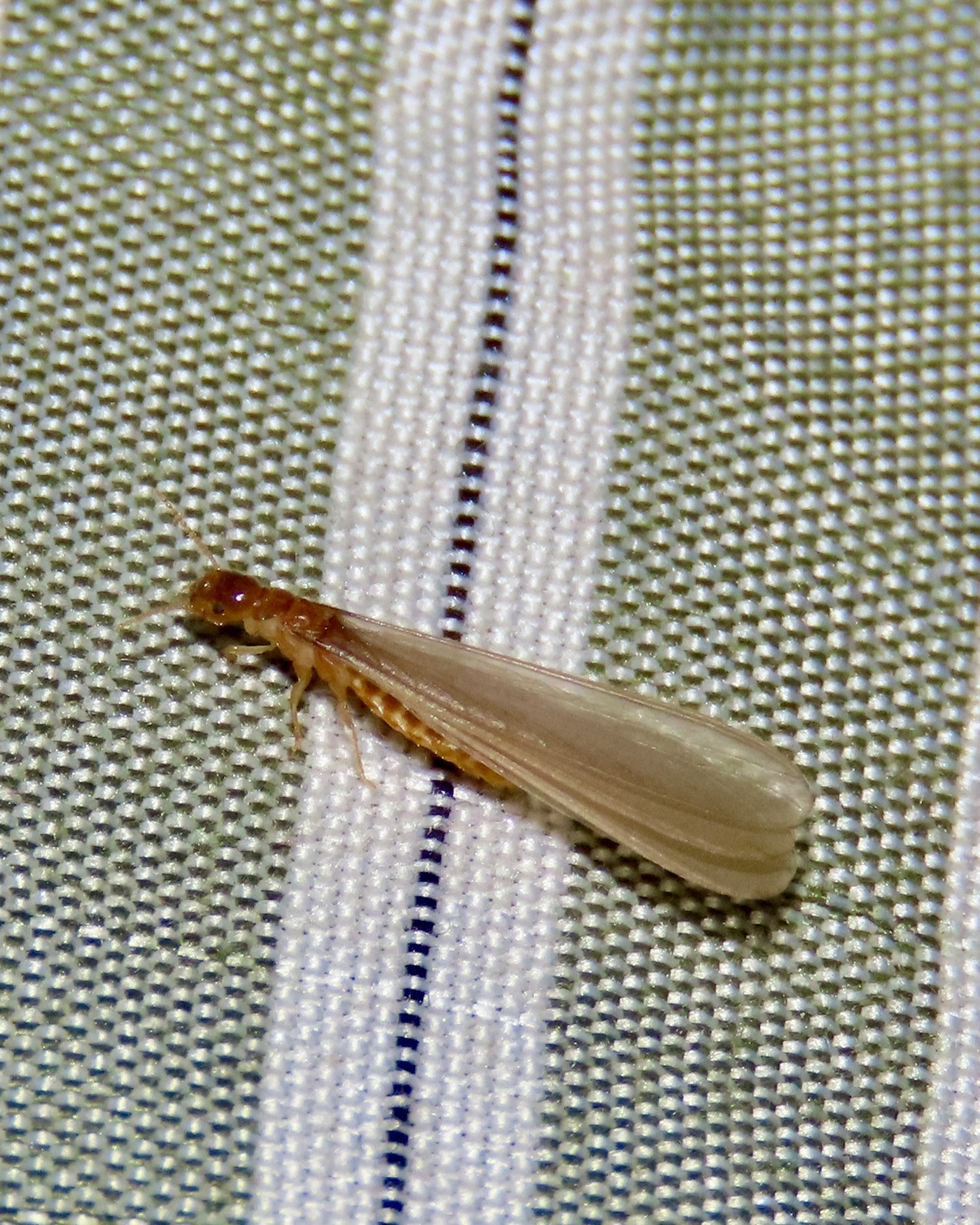

Scientific classification
- Domain: Eukaryota
- Kingdom: Animalia
- Phylum: Arthropoda
- Class: Insecta
- Order: Blattodea
- Infraorder: Isoptera
- Genus: Heterotermes
- Species: H. aureus

Binomial name
- Heterotermes aureus (Snyder, 1920)

Synonyms
- Reticulitermes aureus Snyder, 1920

= Heterotermes aureus =

Species of termite

Heterotermes aureus, commonly known as the desert subterranean termite, is a species of termite in the family Heterotermitidae. It is native to the deserts of North America where the colony has an underground nest.

== Description ==
This is a small termite species. The winged reproductives which emerge from the nest are about 4 mm (0.16 in) long, including their wings. The forewings are larger than the hind wings and have two distinctive hardened veins at the front. The fontanelle (front gland pore) on the head is indistinct or missing, and the body is pale yellowish brown. The soldiers have rectangular heads with a distinct fontanelle and long slender mandibles, which are fairly straight but slightly inwardly-curving near the tip. This distinguishes this species from the western subterranean termite (Reticulitermes hesperus) which has thick, curved mandibles.

== Distribution and habitat ==
Heterotermes aureus is endemic to northern Mexico and the southwestern United States. The termites are found in arid habitats, particularly the Colorado and Sonoran Deserts. They also feed on structural timber in buildings, fences and utility poles. This is one of the commonest underground termites in Arizona, and is able to feed in drier locations than other subterranean desert species. When it enters buildings, which it can do through a minute crack in concrete, it prefers to feed on wood that grew in spring rather than summer growth, which has a higher lignin content; the attacked timbers have a honeycomb-like appearance with soil in the galleries. The termites can create free-standing tubes descending from the ceiling.

== The colony ==
A colony of Heterotermes aureus consists of four castes: a queen living deep underground, winged alates, workers and soldiers. The colony size has been estimated as being in the range 45,000 to 300,000 workers. Tunnels are made either underground or on the surface in the form of sealed tubes. The termites only venture into the open air when the young winged reproductives emerge to embark on their nuptial flights on warm humid nights in summer.

== Ecology ==
This termite feeds on dead wood. Foraging parties search for standing timber, dead cacti and suitable pieces of dead wood on the ground. It prefers to forage in shaded or damp areas, and creates yellowish-brown mud shelter tubes with a circular cross-section, to go over or round objects. Although the termite is a generalist detritivore, in a research study in the Sonoran Desert, the blue palo verde (Parkinsonia florida ) was the most common dead wood species, and was consumed in the greatest quantities. Nevertheless, choller (Cylindropuntia), mesquite (Prosopis) and catclaw (Senegalia greggii) were preferred when they were available. Like other termites in the family Heterotermitidae, Heterotermes aureus harbours symbiotic protists in its gut which help it with the digestion of cellulose.
