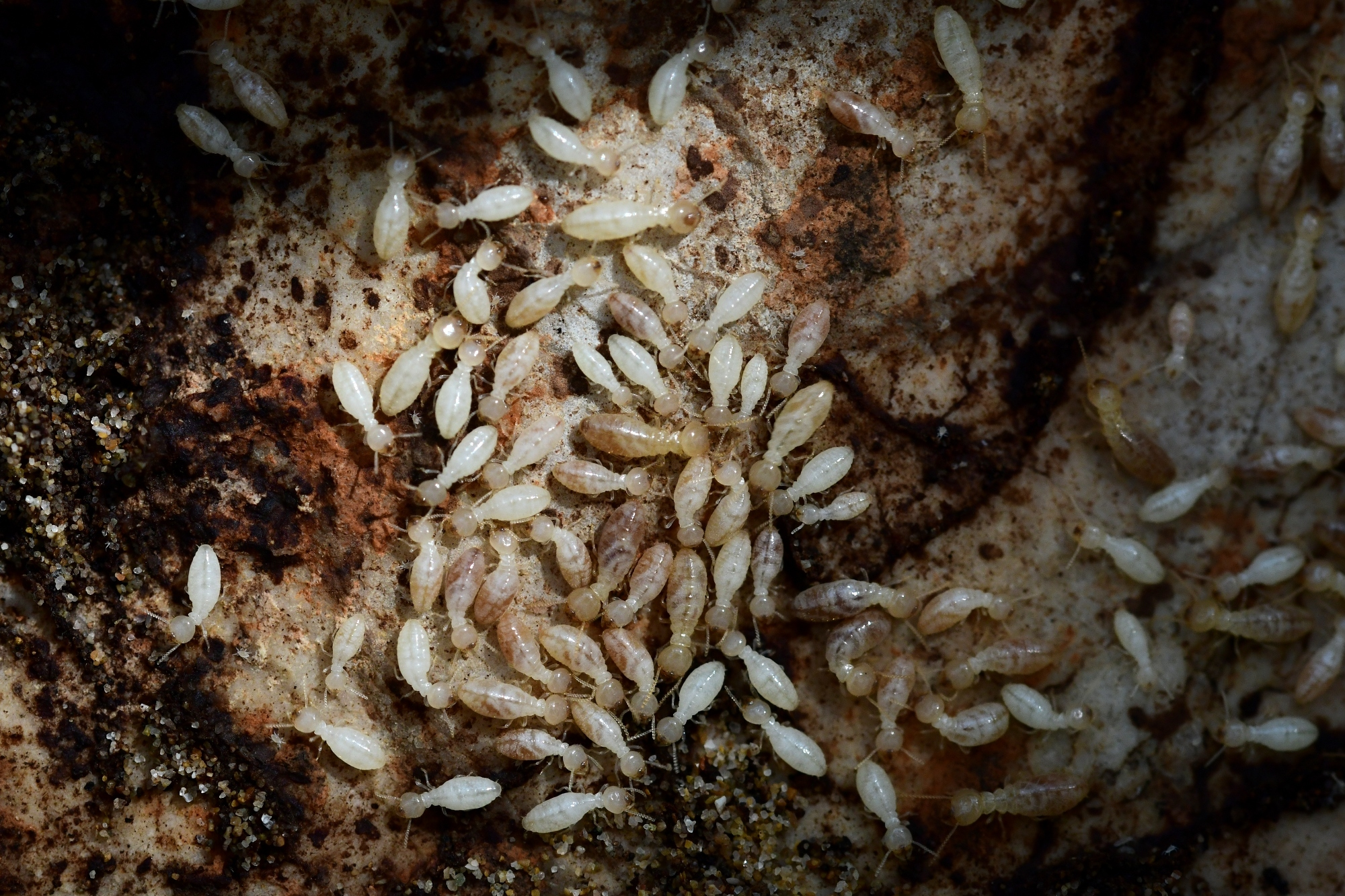
- Reticulitermes urbis colony in Western Greece

Scientific classification
- Kingdom: Animalia
- Phylum: Arthropoda
- Clade: Pancrustacea
- Class: Insecta
- Order: Blattodea
- Infraorder: Isoptera
- Family: Heterotermitidae
- Genus: Reticulitermes
- Species: R. urbis

Binomial name
- Reticulitermes urbis Bagnères, Uva & Clément, 2003

Synonyms
- Reticulitermes sp. nov. (Bagnères et al., 2001)

= Reticulitermes urbis =

Species of termite

Reticulitermes urbis, commonly known as urban subterranean termite, is a species of subterranean termite in the family Heterotermitidae. It was described in 2003 from specimens collected in Domène (Isère, France) and Bagnacavallo (Bologna, Italy). The species is native to the Balkan Peninsula and has been introduced into Italy and southeastern France, where it is considered an invasive urban pest.

== Description ==
Reticulitermes urbis can be distinguished from other European Reticulitermes species by the following morphological characters: the post-clypeus is curved and prominent, extending above the top of the head; in alates (winged reproductives), the tibiae are dark, the wings are clear, and the head is very dark. The species also possesses a distinctive cuticular hydrocarbon profile and defensive soldier secretions. Soldiers produce defensive secretions with affinities to those of R. balkanensis.

== Distribution and habitat ==
Reticulitermes urbis has a disjunct distribution. In its native range, it occurs along the Adriatic coast of the Balkans: Croatia, Bosnia-Herzegovina, Montenegro, and Greece (including the Peloponnese, western Greece, and the Ionian islands). In these areas, it is found in natural Mediterranean habitats such as maquis shrubland, degraded holm oak forests and pine forests, from sea level up to about 50 m elevation.

In its introduced range, R. urbis is found exclusively in urban and peri-urban areas. In Italy, it occurs in the north-east (Veneto, Emilia-Romagna) and south (Apulia, Basilicata). In France, it is present in the south-east (Isère, Bouches-du-Rhône, Var, Alpes-Maritimes), including the cities of Domène, Grenoble, Marseille, La Ciotat, Saint-Cyr-Les-Lecques, Antibes, and Sophia Antipolis.

In Italy, R. urbis is found sympatrically (co-occurring) with the native Reticulitermes lucifugus in Friuli-Venezia Giulia, Apulia, Basilicata, and along the Adriatic and Ionian sides.

== Phylogeny and biogeography ==
Molecular phylogenetic analyses based on mitochondrial and nuclear markers place R. urbis within an eastern Mediterranean clade that includes R. balkanensis (Balkans), R. clypeatus (Israel), and a Turkish lineage previously identified as R. lucifugus. The split between R. urbis and its eastern Mediterranean relatives is estimated to have occurred during the Quaternary glaciations.

Genetic diversity is significantly higher in Balkan populations than in Italian and French populations, suggesting a founder effect during introduction. The parsimony network shows no clear association between mtDNA haplotypes and geographic regions in the introduced range, indicating human-mediated dispersal. Results support a history of multiple introduction events into Italy and France from different Balkan source populations, consistent with continuous exchanges along human trade routes.

== Social organization and breeding structure ==
Unlike many other Reticulitermes species that have both simple-family colonies (headed by a single primary pair) and extended-family colonies (with secondary reproductives, neotenics), R. urbis colonies in both native and introduced populations are exclusively extended-family colonies. All colonies studied contain multiple reproductives (neotenics), which are offspring of the original primary pair. Colonies never possess five or more alleles at any microsatellite locus, indicating that all supernumerary reproductives are descendants of a single founding pair.

In urban populations, F-statistics indicate that only about two neotenics are reproductively active within a colony, despite many individuals differentiating into neotenics. In semi-urbanized populations, between 10 and 300 neotenics may interbreed over several generations. This suggests that the number of active reproductives is regulated, possibly by pheromonal inhibition, and may vary with habitat type.

In the Domène population (France), genetic analysis revealed a unicolonial population (supercolony) covering nearly 7 hectares, with all collection points belonging to a single extended-family colony with separate reproductive centers. This supercolony exhibited no intraspecific aggression between nests, high termite density (approximately 2,200 termites per m²), and dispersion by budding (colony fragmentation). This is the first documented case of unicoloniality in termites.

== Caste differentiation and colony growth ==
Laboratory studies have shown that colonies of R. urbis initiated with fewer than 20 workers die within 60 weeks, while colonies started with at least 20 workers can survive, with varied survival rates depending on initial size and season of formation (summer or autumn). The number of nymphs initially present does not affect colony survival or growth. Reproductives develop from nymphs within two weeks and later from workers. Many neotenics derived from nymphs are killed by workers. Three years after colony initiation, the majority of colonies contain only two reproductives. A few individual workers may still be alive after 3 years. Soldier proportions range from 5.23% to 7.69% of the total population. The number of viable "juveniles" is relatively low throughout the tests, and overall population growth is insufficient to replace dead workers or significantly increase colony size. The potential to establish viable colonies from small groups (5–50 workers) is very low.

== Pest status and control ==
Reticulitermes urbis causes significant damage to wooden structures and furniture in infested buildings. The most notable infestation occurs in the old town of Bagnacavallo (Ravenna, Italy), where the species has been present for 30–40 years and affects an area of approximately 20 hectares, including eight churches and four monasteries containing artworks of historical value. A 15-year monitoring-baiting program using the insect growth regulator (IGR) hexaflumuron successfully eliminated termites from the Bagnacavallo old town.

Similar successful control has been achieved in Domène (France), where a supercolony covering 6.8 hectares was treated, achieving 95% termite-free status within a few years. The unicolonial structure of the Domène population facilitated the spread of bait toxin through trophallaxis (food exchange) across the entire supercolony.
