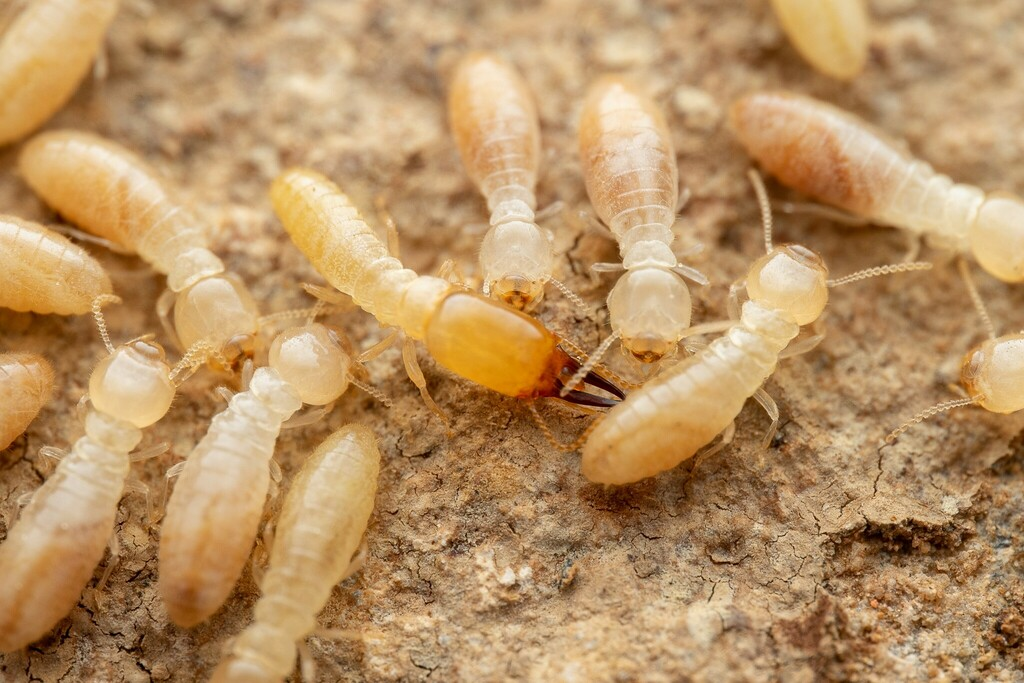
- A colony of H. aureus found after lifting a rock

Scientific classification
- Domain: Eukaryota
- Kingdom: Animalia
- Phylum: Arthropoda
- Class: Insecta
- Order: Blattodea
- Infraorder: Isoptera
- Family: Heterotermitidae
- Genus: Heterotermes; Froggatt, 1896

= Heterotermes =

Genus of termites

Heterotermes is a genus of subterranean termites belonging to the family Heterotermitidae. The genus has an almost cosmopolitan distribution. One of their closest relatives is the Reticulitermes genus.

== General overview ==
Heterotermes are considered pests because they form large colonies and can cause severe property damage. They feed themselves by gathering cellulose from natural sources including dead tree logs, stumps, and branches as well as from man-made wooden structures such as buildings, books and paper.

Heterotermes are considered to be highly adaptable, having a relatively fast growth rate in mature colonies with good conditions. They are found in dry and humid wooded areas, such as the West Indies and the Bahamas, except for Heterotermes aureus, which has been found in Northwestern Mexico and the Southwestern United States. Heterotermes show relatively fast neotenic formation within the colony and are only observed to have the nymphoid neotenic caste as a secondary reproductive.

They are similar in appearance to Reticulitermes, but Heterotermes soldiers are smaller and exhibit a mandible with a curved tip and a base area that is straighter than that of Reticulitermes.

== Castes ==
=== Primary reproductives ===
The alates of many Heterotermes and Reticulitermes are very similar in morphology. However, many Heterotermes gynes are more lightly pigmented (color range is usually pale yellow-brown to orange-brown) than Reticulitermes. They are between 7 and 11 millimeters in length. A colony usually only consists of one pair of primary reproductives, but they are occasionally found to have more than one reproductive pair.

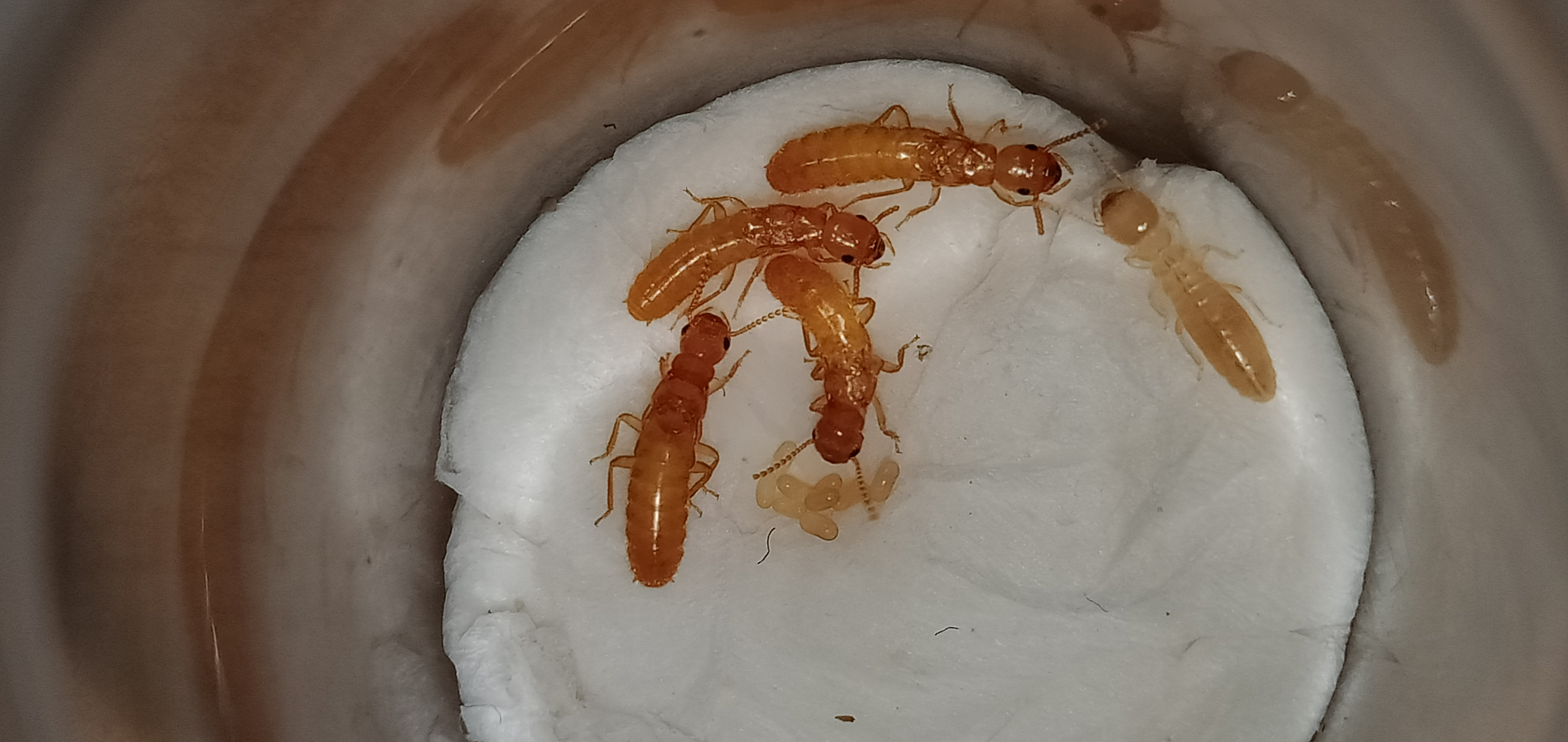
Heterotermes alates with eggs. By Dulneth Wijewardana

=== Secondary reproductives ===
The only type of secondary reproductive found in Heterotermes are nymphoid neotenic individuals. They usually arise in case of colony isolation or the death of primary reproductives. They start to develop from nymphs around their third instar. Older nymphs of this caste are also found to molt back into a nymphoid neotenic in case they are needed. A colony can have multiple nymphoid neotenic pairs that become physogastric within the first few weeks to produce eggs. Similar to workers, they lack visible eyes and are usually lightly pigmented which gives them a light orange tint.

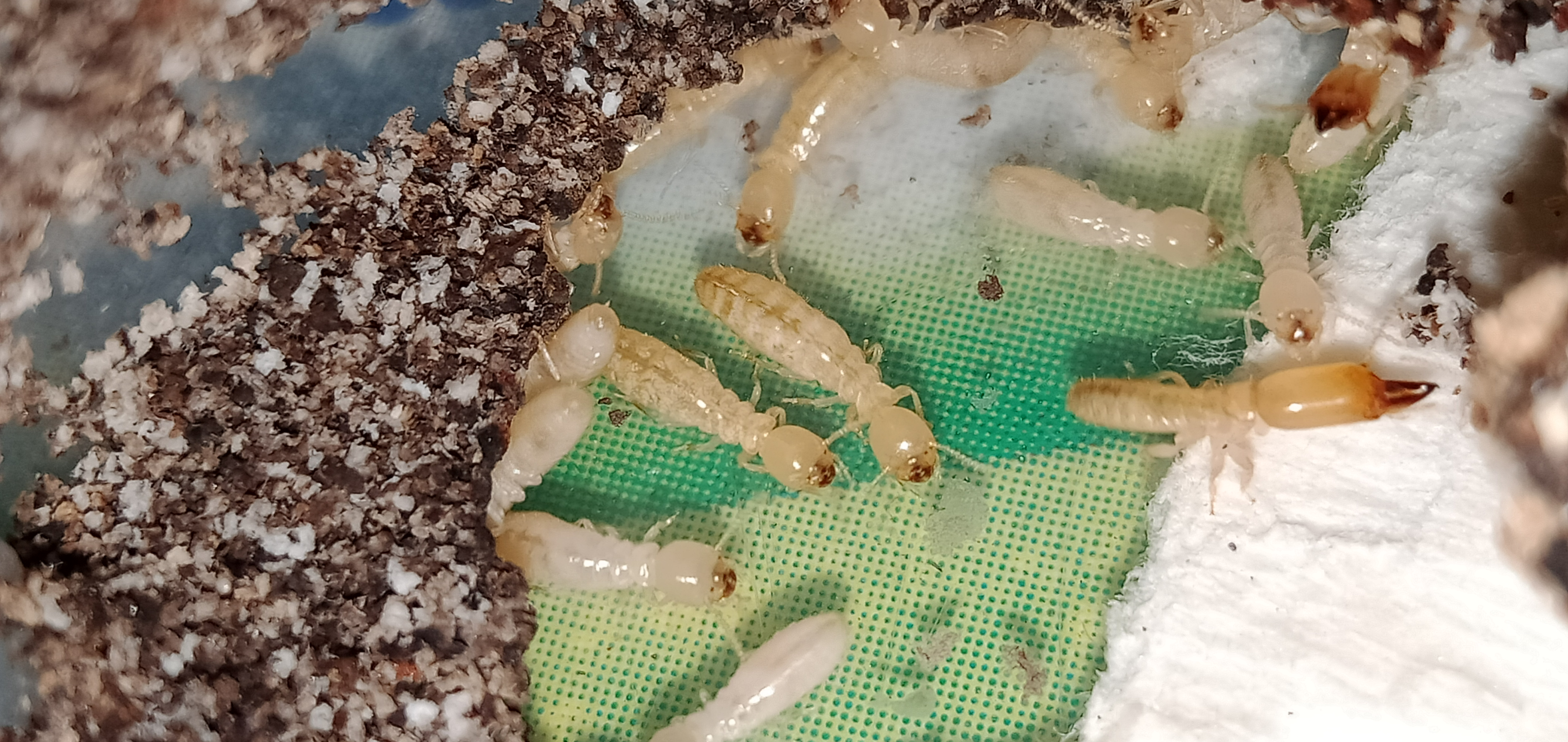
Nymphoid neotenic females of Heterotermes, By Dulneth Wijewardana

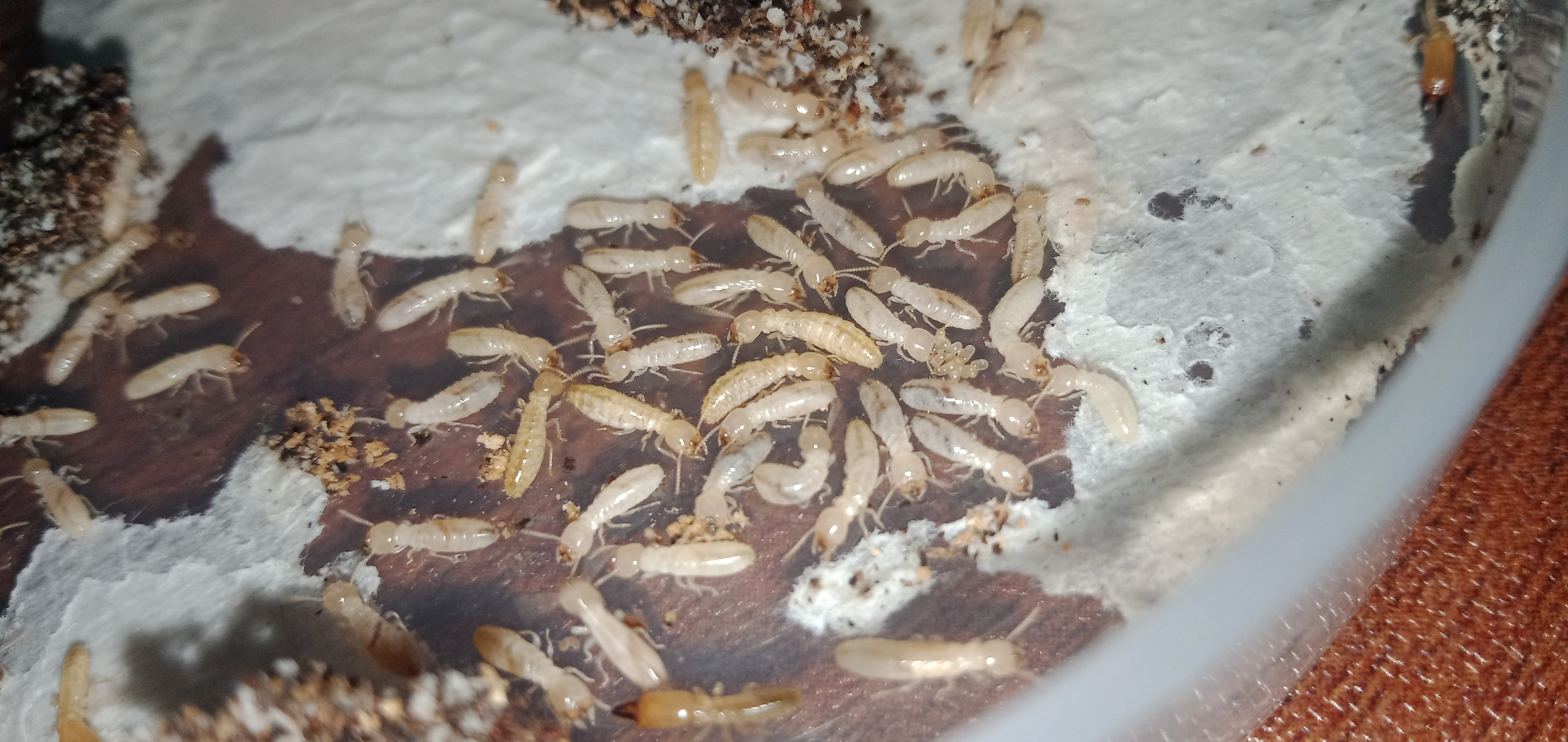
Nymphoid neotenic pairs among colony with eggs and workers, By Dulneth Wijewardana

=== Workers and soldiers ===
Workers make up the majority of a colony alongside soldiers. Workers perform tasks such as gathering food, expanding the nest, and caring for reproductives and their brood, while soldiers perform the task of defending the nest against intruders. Soldiers will excrete a light grey-tinted sticky liquid when disturbed, and are also found to bump their heads into nest walls to alert fellow colony members about arriving danger.

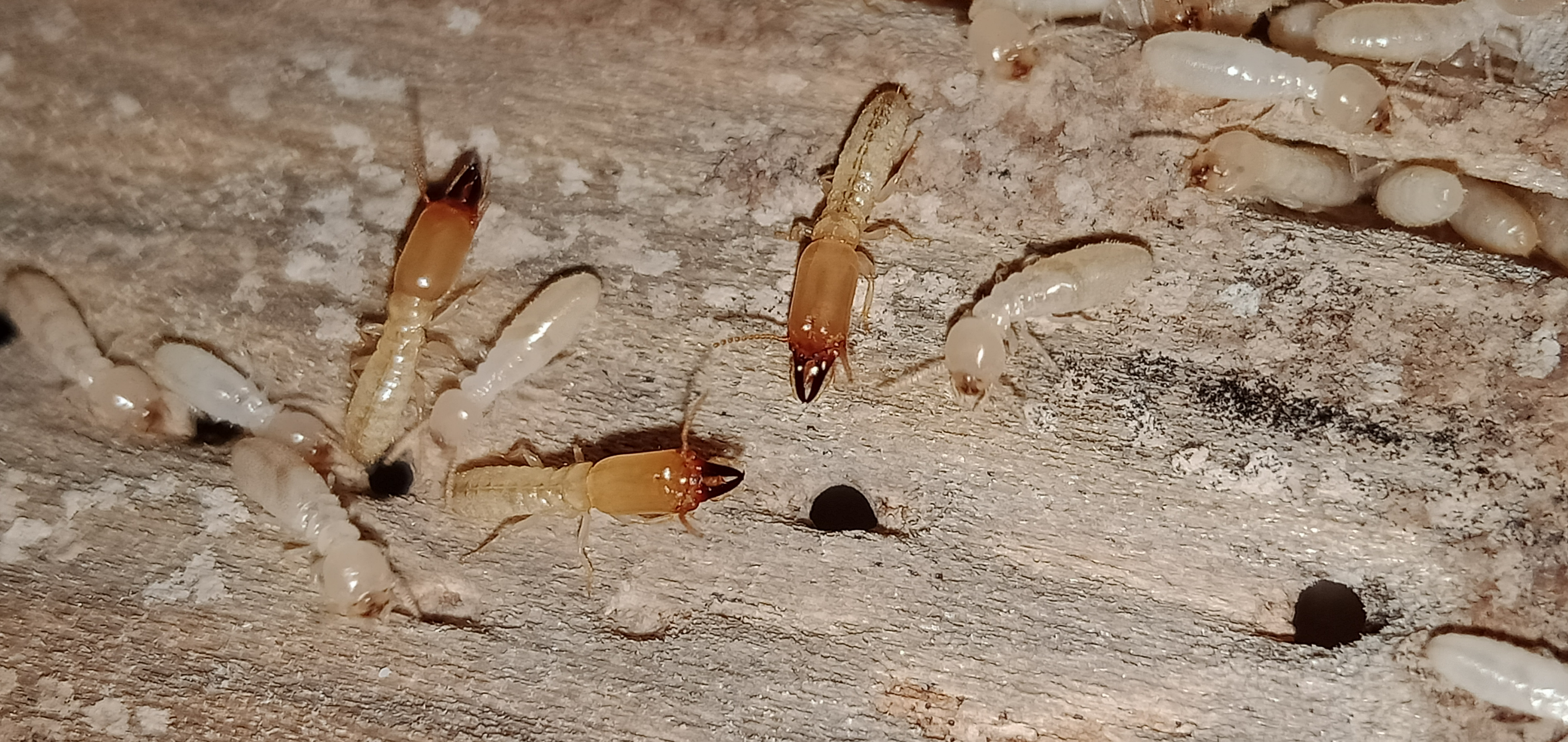
Workers and Soldiers found within a heterotermes colony, By Dulneth Wijewardana

== Species ==
- Heterotermes aethiopicus (Sjöstedt, 1911)
- Heterotermes assu (Constantino, 2000)
- Heterotermes aureus (Snyder, 1920)
- Heterotermes balwanti (Mathur & Chhotani, 1969)
- Heterotermes brevicatena (Watson & Miller, 1989)
- Heterotermes cardini (Snyder, 1924)
- Heterotermes ceylonicus (Holmgren, 1911)
- Heterotermes convexinotatus (Snyder, 1924)
- Heterotermes crinitus (Emerson, 1924)
- Heterotermes eocenicus (Engel, 2008)
- Heterotermes ferox (Froggatt, 1898)
- Heterotermes gertrudae (Roonwal, 1953)
- Heterotermes indicola (Wasmann, 1902)
- Heterotermes intermedius (Hill, 1932)
- Heterotermes longicatena (Watson & Miller, 1989)
- Heterotermes longiceps (Snyder, 1924)
- Heterotermes maculatus (Light, 1933)
- Heterotermes malabaricus (Snyder, 1933)
- Heterotermes occiduus (Hill, 1927)
- Heterotermes omanae (Chhotani, 1988)
- Heterotermes pamatatensis (Kemner, 1934)
- Heterotermes paradoxus (Froggatt, 1898)
- Heterotermes perfidus (Silvestri, 1936)
- Heterotermes philippinensis (Light, 1921)
- Heterotermes platycephalus (Froggatt, 1897)
- Heterotermes primaevus (Snyder, 1960)
- Heterotermes sulcatus (Mathews, 1977)
- Heterotermes tenuior (Haviland, 1898)
- Heterotermes tenuis (Hagen, 1858)
- Heterotermes vagus (Hill, 1927)
- Heterotermes validus (Hill, 1915)
- Heterotermes wittmeri (Chhotani & Bose, 1982)
