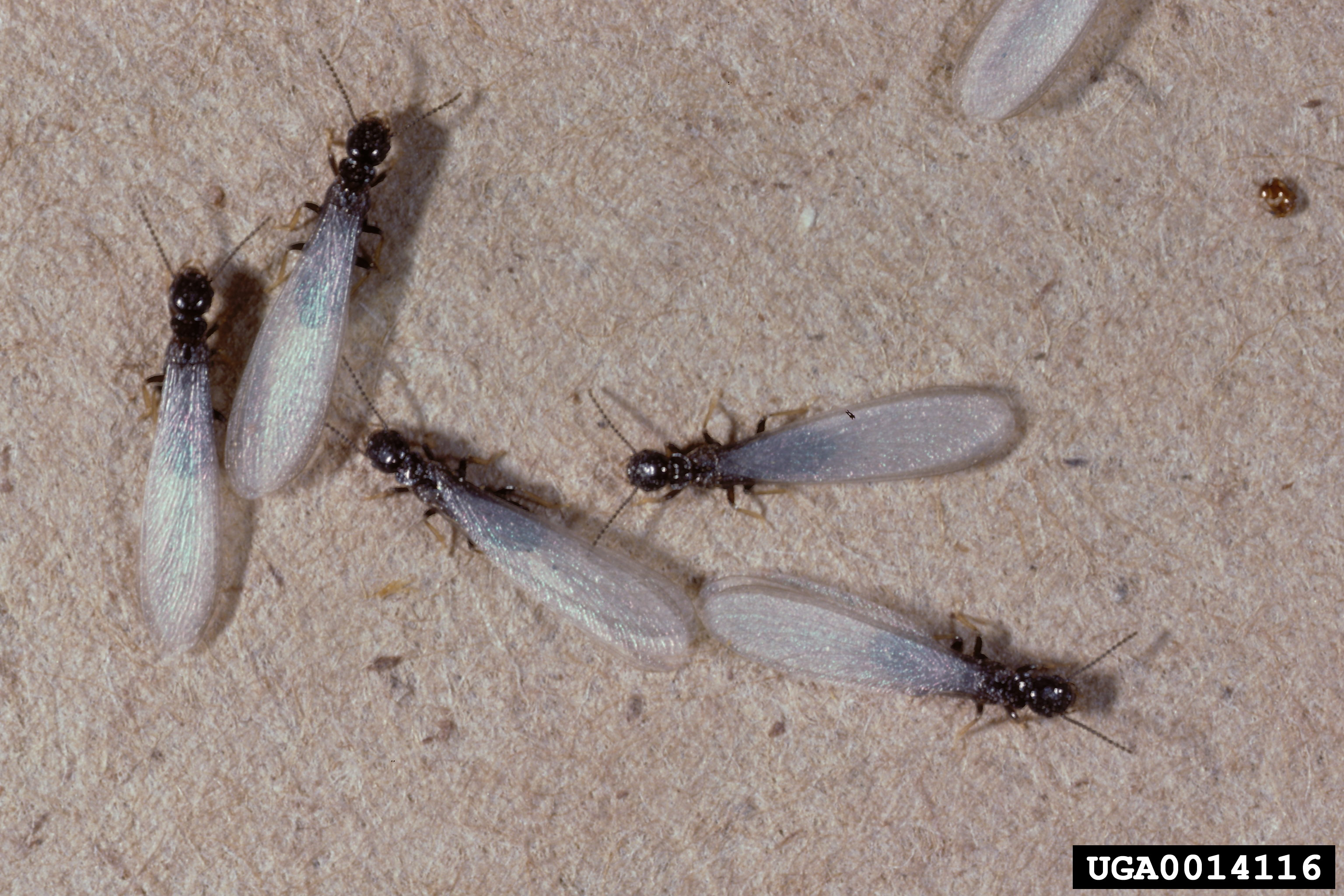

Scientific classification
- Domain: Eukaryota
- Kingdom: Animalia
- Phylum: Arthropoda
- Class: Insecta
- Order: Blattodea
- Infraorder: Isoptera
- Family: Rhinotermitidae
- Genus: Reticulitermes
- Species: R. virginicus

Binomial name
- Reticulitermes virginicus (Banks, 1907)

= Reticulitermes virginicus =

Species of termite

Reticulitermes virginicus is a species of subterranean termite native to North America, found often in the southern United States. It was described in 1907.

Like all other termite species, R. virginicus is a eusocial species, characterized by individuals in a colony with overlapped generations cooperating in brood care and having reproductive division of labor. The adults that grow wings and fly from the nest to find a mate and start a new colony are called alates, or winged reproductives. In this species they are dark brown. Alates leave the nest between early February and late May. They prefer warm and sunny afternoons after rain. Like in all other termite species, all four of their wings are equal length. R. virginicus alates have wings about 0.3 inches (0.76 cm) long with two visible, hardened and thickened veins.

== Life cycle ==
These termites live underground, and their presence is often undetected. Winged reproductives (alates) appear above ground in the late winter or spring. When this happens inside a house, this may alert the homeowner to the fact that the termites are present. After a short flight, the insects shed their wings, and a female will search for a crevice or other suitable underground nesting site and be joined there by a male. Having mated and excavated a chamber, the female (queen) starts laying eggs. The first batch of eggs hatch into larvae which develop into workers; these enlarge the nest, search for food and carry it back to the nest. As the number of termites in the colony increases, some workers further develop into soldiers; in well-established colonies, there may be hundreds of thousands of individual insects. Alates are not produced until the colony has been established for several years. In large colonies, it is possible for workers to develop into non-winged reproductives which lay eggs to supplement the queen's effort, or which can replace her should she die.

== Damage ==
The termites tunnel underground, foraging up to 150 ft (46 m) from the nest. If they venture above ground, they create tubes to protect their passageways. They can enter buildings through joints in the mortar or cracks in the foundations. They feed on wood, and harbour symbiotic bacteria in the gut to help them digest the cellulose. They hollow out timbers, leaving a paper-thin surface intact, which may appear blistered or peeling. In the United States, Reticulitermes flavipes, Reticulitermes virginicus and Coptotermes formosanus are responsible for 80% of the damage done by termites.
