= Heterotermes indicola =

Scientific classification
- Kingdom: Animalia
- Phylum: Arthropoda
- Class: Insecta
- Order: Blattodea
- Infraorder: Isoptera
- Family: Heterotermitidae
- Genus: Heterotermes
- Species: H. indicola

Binomial name
- Heterotermes indicola (Wasmann, 1902)

Synonyms
- Leucotermes indicola Wasmann, 1902

Species of termite

Heterotermes indicola, is a species of subterranean termite of the genus Heterotermes. It is native to tropical India, Pakistan and Sri Lanka but has extended its range into the subtropics and warm temperate areas of the Himalayan foothills to altitudes of about 2,000 m (6,600 ft). It causes damage to timber in buildings and is one of the most destructive termites in urban and agricultural areas in the world. Soldiers are about 4.1-4.9mm long. Extracts of garlic and Calotropis procera are known to have termiticidal effects on H. indicola.

== Ecology ==
Subterranean termites live in colonies underground, with no mounds or above-ground structures to indicate that they are present. Sugarcane can be severely attacked causing 90 to 100% damage, fruit orchards 80 to 90% damage, maize 45% damage and wheat 10 to 12% damage. Another crop attacked by this termite is the bitter melon (Momordica charantia). This termite favours a soil moisture content of 20 to 30%, and a timber moisture content of 80 to 100%.

These termites are known to attack and feed on many economically important species on a large scale, reducing their yield. Trees and woody plants attacked include:

- Abies pindrow
- Acacia arabica
- Albizzia lebbeck
- Alstonia scholaris
- Azadirachta indica
- Betula utilis
- Camellia sinensis
- Cedrus deodara
- Cordia oblique
- Dalbergia sissoo
- Ehretia serrate
- Erythrina suberosa
- Eucalyptus citriodora
- Ficus religiosa
- Heterophragma adenophyllum
- Mangifera indica
- Melia azedarach
- Momordica charantia
- Moringa oleifera
- Morus spp.
- Pinus wallichiana
- Pinus roxberghii
- Populus deltoides
- Putranjiva roxburghii
- Syzygium cumini
- Terminalia arjuna
- Ziziphus jujuba

== Structural damage ==
This subterranean termite causes extensive damage in houses to wooden structures, as well as feeding on paper, cloth and other cellulose-containing products. It gains entry to buildings through timber in contact with the ground, creating galleries along the grain of the wood. It hollows out the timber, leaving a thin external layer intact and plastering the interior surfaces with excreta. It also creates mud tunnels along surfaces, and sometimes creates hanging, stub tunnels, a particular characteristic of this species. Timber buildings can be badly affected by this termite, and in the 1940s, the small town of Sri Hargobindpur in Punjab had to be abandoned because of the destruction wreaked by this species.
