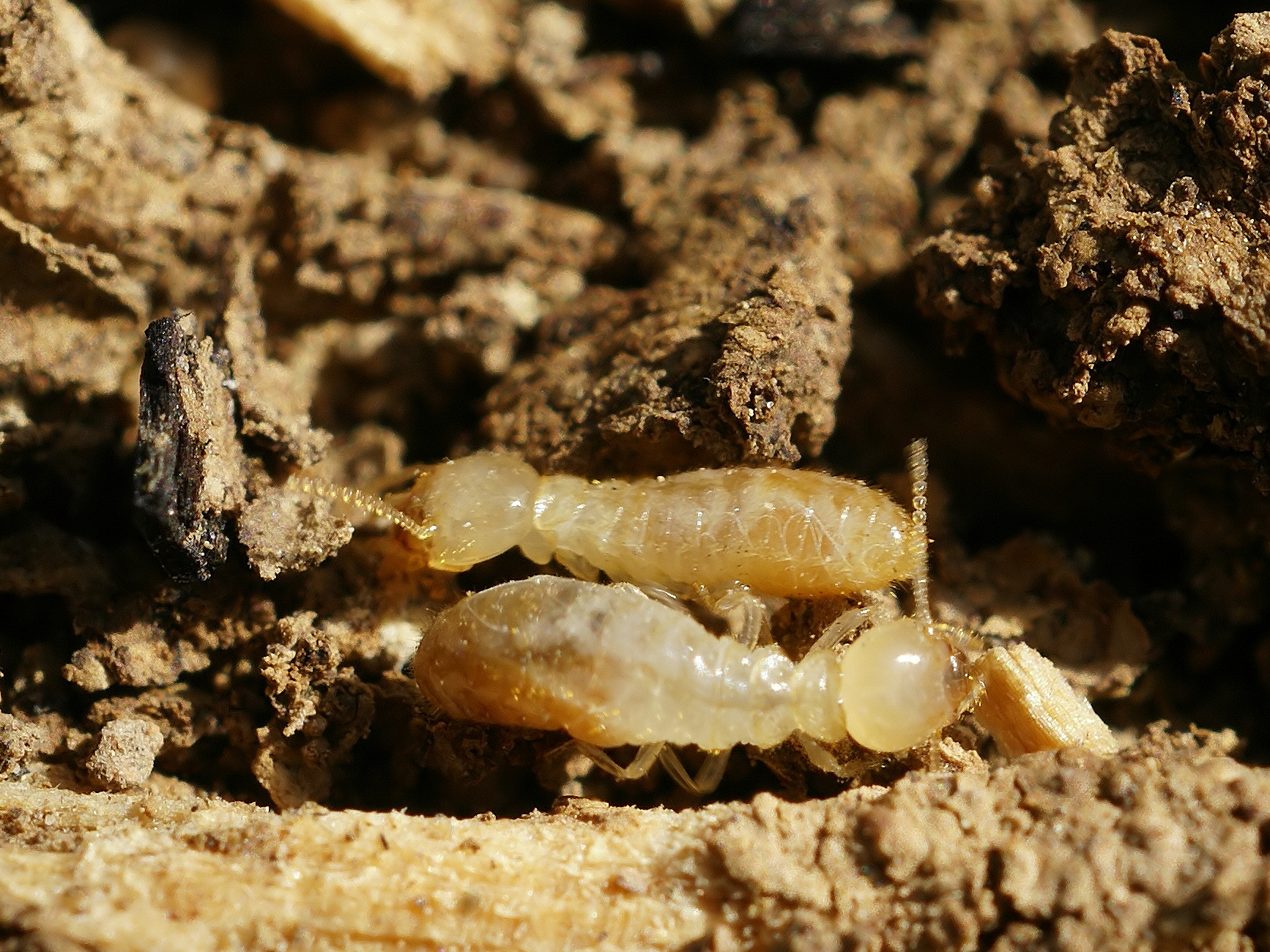

Scientific classification
- Kingdom: Animalia
- Phylum: Arthropoda
- Clade: Pancrustacea
- Class: Insecta
- Order: Blattodea
- Infraorder: Isoptera
- Family: Heterotermitidae
- Genus: Reticulitermes
- Species: R. banyulensis

Binomial name
- Reticulitermes banyulensis Clément, 1978

= Reticulitermes banyulensis =

Species of termite

Reticulitermes banyulensis is a species of termite of the family Heterotermitidae found in the Roussillon region in France.
