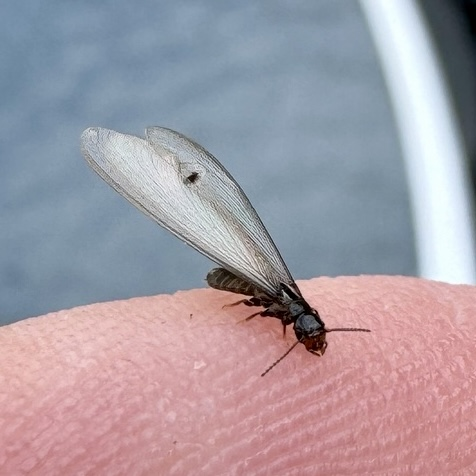
- Reproductive adult on the wing
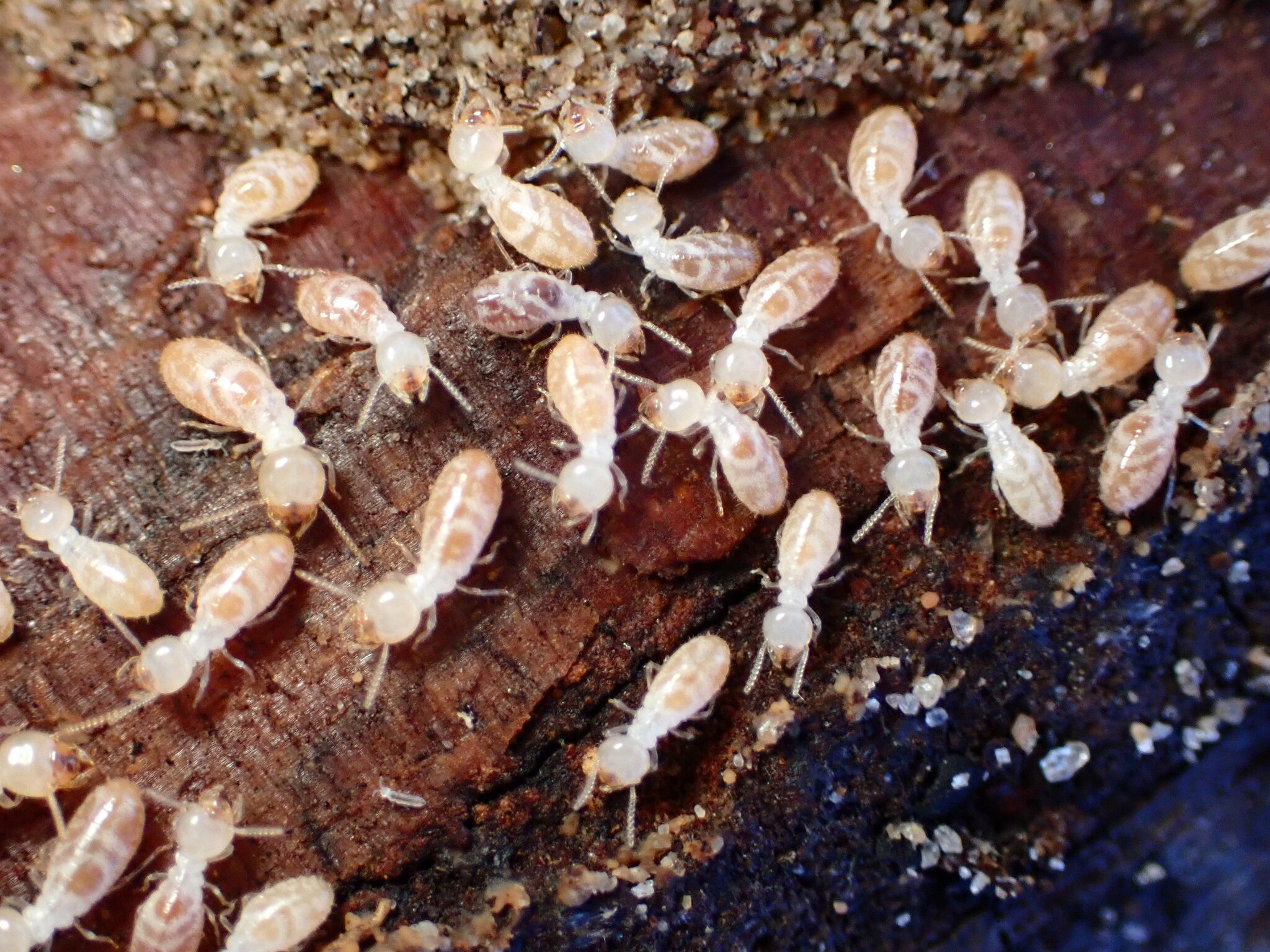
- Workers in the colony

Scientific classification
- Kingdom: Animalia
- Phylum: Arthropoda
- Class: Insecta
- Order: Blattodea
- Infraorder: Isoptera
- Family: Heterotermitidae
- Genus: Reticulitermes
- Species: R. hesperus

Binomial name
- Reticulitermes hesperus Banks in Banks & Snyder, 1920

= Reticulitermes hesperus =

Species of termite

Reticulitermes hesperus, the western subterranean termite, is a species of termite in the family Heterotermitidae. It is found in Central America and North America. R. hesperus is native to the coast between British Columbia and Southern California. Like other subterranean termites, they live underground, where they have elaborate eusocial societies composed of a queen, workers, and soldiers, as well as a rotating case of sexually reproductive adults and their larval and immature offspring. The reproductive adults are the only ones with functional wings. The reproductive adults will swarm on warm days in spring and fall, particularly after a rain event, looking for mating partners. These termites prefer moist living environments and prefer to consume wood that has already been partially decayed by saprotrophic fungus.

A similar species, Reticulitermes tibialis, is more common in the interior of western North America.

== Ecology ==
Adults and nymphs are preyed on by the larvae of the lacewing Lomamyia latipennis. The lacewing lays its eggs on stumps and rotten logs and the newly hatched larvae make their way to termite galleries via crevices. Having found a termite, the first instar larva waves its abdomen and releases an allomone which paralyses the termite in two to three minutes; it then consumes the termite. Second and third instar lacewing larvae can subdue several termites at the same time.

== See also ==
- Heterotermes aureus
