= Reticulitermes arenincola =

Scientific classification
- Domain: Eukaryota
- Kingdom: Animalia
- Phylum: Arthropoda
- Class: Insecta
- Order: Blattodea
- Infraorder: Isoptera
- Family: Heterotermitidae
- Genus: Reticulitermes
- Species: R. arenincola

Binomial name
- Reticulitermes arenincola Goellner, 1931

Species of termite

Reticulitermes arenincola is a species of subterranean termite native to North America.
