= Liberimonas magnetica =

Candidatus Liberimonas magnetica

Scientific classification (Candidatus)
- Domain: Bacteria
- Kingdom: Pseudomonadati
- Phylum: Elusimicrobiota
- Class: Endomicrobiia
- Order: Endomicrobiales
- Family: Liberimonadaceae
- Genus: Ca. Liberimonas
- Species: Ca. Liberimonas magnetica

Binomial name
- Candidatus Liberimonas magnetica Uzun et al. 2023

Candidate species of bacteria

Candidatus Liberimonas magnetica is a species of bacteria from the phylum of Elusimicrobiota. It is considered part of the "rare biosphere", meaning it is found at very low concentrations in the environments they inhabit. Liberimonas magnetica is uncultured as of yet, so its name is currently provisional.
