= Elusimicrobiota =

Scientific classification
- Domain: Bacteria
- Kingdom: Pseudomonadati
- Phylum: Elusimicrobiota; Geissinger et al. 2021

Classes
- Elusimicrobia; Endomicrobiia

Synonyms
- "Elusimicrobaeota" Oren et al. 2015; "Elusimicrobia" Geissinger et al. 2009; "Elusimicrobiota" Whitman et al. 2018; Candidate phylum TG1

Phylum of bacteria

The phylum Elusimicrobiota, previously known as "Termite Group 1", has been shown to be widespread in different ecosystems like marine environment, sewage sludge, contaminated sites and soils, and toxic wastes. The high abundance of Elusimicrobiota representatives is only seen for the lineage of symbionts found in termites and ants.

The first organism to be cultured was Elusimicrobium minutum; however, two other species have been partially described and placed in a separate class, known as Endomicrobia.

== History ==
Members of the phylum now named Elusimicrobiota were first identified in the gut of the termite Reticulitermes speratus through 16S rRNA sequencing in 1996. This novel group was named "Termite Group 1". In 1998, Termite Group 1 was designated as a candidate phylum.

In 2005, the name "Endomicrobia" was proposed for the candidate phylum.

In 2009, Elusimicrobium minutum became the first member of Termite Group 1 to be cultured, and "Elusimicrobia" was proposed as the new phylum name.

Now, Elusimicrobia and Endomicrobia are the two classes within phylum Elusimicrobiota.

== Members and characteristics ==
The first bacteria in the phylum to be characterized were found in the gut of the termite species Reticulitermes santonensis. Two proposed species, Endomicrobium trichonymphae and Endomicrobium pyrsonymphae, live as endosymbionts in the cytoplasms of two different flagellates, Trichonympha agilis and Pyrsonympha vertens, respectively. The bacteria are both small, with a length of about 0.6 μm, and have two membranes.

Members of the phylum are not exclusive to the termite gut and have been found in the guts of other organisms including the wood-feeding cockroach and the cow rumen. Elusimicrobiota sequences have also been identified in environmental samples such as soil and marine sediments.

Two species of Elusimicrobiota have been cultured. The first, Elusimicrobium minutum, belongs to the class Elusimicrobia. This gram-negative bacteria was isolated from the hindgut of Pachnoda ephippiata larva, which is a scarab beetle. Elusimicrobium minutum is small at about 0.3 to 2.5 μm long, classifying it as an ultramicrobacterium. It is a mesophile, growing at temperatures from 20 to 32°C. As an obligate anaerobe, it relies solely on fermentation of sugars for energy, producing acetate, ethanol, lactate, hydrogen, and alanine.

The second species that has been cultured is Endomicrobium proavitum. It was isolated from the gut of the termite Reticulitermes santonensis. Unlike the uncultured species previous characterized from this organism, Endomicrobium proavitum is free-living, not an endosymbiont. Similar to Elusimicrobium minutum, it is a gram-negative, obligate anaerobe, and also qualifies as an ultramicrobacterium. It can only ferment glucose, producing acetate, lactate, hydrogen, and CO_{2}. Endomicrobium proavitum is also capable of nitrogen fixation. Another feature of Endomicrobium proavitum is that the most common cell shape changes throughout the growth cycle. During the stationary phase when the bacterial population is not growing, the cells are a round cocciod shape. During a period of growth, most cells are rod-shaped. Some of the rod-shaped cells eventually form a bud at one end. Endomicrobium proavitum is a member of the family Endomicrobiaceae. Genomic analysis suggests that all members of this family are also obligate anaerobes that ferment sugars.

Two proposed Elusimicrobiota species were identified by sequencing in black bog soil. Candidatus Liberimonas magnetica belongs to the class Endomicrobia, while Candidatus Obscuribacterium magneticum belongs to the class Elusimicrobia. These species appear to encode genes for magnetosomes, which are cellular structures that contain magnetic crystals. This suggests that they are capable of orienting themselves along magnetic fields in a process called magnetotaxis. Candidatus Liberimonas magnetica may rely on fermentation, while Candidatus Obscuribacterium magneticum may rely on respiration for energy.

== Phylogeny ==
16S rRNA based LTP_10_2024

- - Elusimicrobiales Elusimicrobiaceae
    - Elusimicrobium
  - Endomicrobiales Endomicrobiaceae
    - Endomicrobium

120 marker proteins based GTDB 10-RS226

- - "Elusimicrobiia"
    - "Obscuribacteriales"
      - "Obscuribacteriaceae"
        "Ca. Obscuribacterium"
    - Elusimicrobiales
      - Elusimicrobiaceae
        - "Ca. Pseudelusimicrobium"
        - - "Ca. Proelusimicrobium"
          - - Elusimicrobium
            - "Ca. Avelusimicrobium"
  - Endomicrobiia
    - Endomicrobiales
      - "Liberimonadaceae"
        "Ca. Liberimonas"
      - Endomicrobiaceae
        - - "Ca. Proruminimicrobium"
          - - "Ca. Praeruminimicrobium"
            - - "Ca. Ruminimicrobium"
              - "Ca. Ruminimicrobiellum"
        - - "Ca. Proendomicrobium"
          - - - "Ca. Ectomicrobium"
              - "Ca. Parendomicrobium"
            - - Endomicrobium
              - "Ca. Endomicrobiellum"

== Taxonomy ==
The currently accepted taxonomy is based solemnly on the List of Prokaryotic names with Standing in Nomenclature (LPSN) and National Center for Biotechnology Information (NCBI).

- Phylum Elusimicrobiota Geissinger et al. 2021
  - Class "Elusimicrobiia" Oren, Parte & Garrity 2016 ex Cavalier-Smith 2020 [Elusimicrobia Geissinger et al. 2010]
    - Order "Obscuribacteriales" Uzun et al. 2023 [F11]
      - Family "Obscuribacteriaceae" Uzun et al. 2023
        - Genus "Ca. Obscuribacterium" Uzun et al. 2023
    - Order Elusimicrobiales Geissinger et al. 2010
      - Family Lloretiaceae" Gago et al. 2024
        - Genus ?"Ca. Lloretia" Gago et al. 2024
      - Family Elusimicrobiaceae Geissinger et al. 2010
        - Genus "Ca. Avelusimicrobium" Gilroy et al. 2021
        - Genus Elusimicrobium Geissinger et al. 2010
        - Genus ?"Parelusimicrobium" Mies et al. 2025
        - Genus "Ca. Proelusimicrobium" Mies et al. 2025
        - Genus "Ca. Pseudelusimicrobium" Mies et al. 2025
  - Class Endomicrobiia corrig. Zheng et al. 2018
    - Order Endomicrobiales Zheng et al. 2018
      - Family "Liberimonadaceae" Uzun et al. 2023
        - Genus "Ca. Liberimonas" Uzun et al. 2023 [JAFGIL01]
      - Family Endomicrobiaceae Zheng et al. 2018
        - Genus "Ca. Ectomicrobium" Mies & Brune 2024 [JAISQF01]
        - Genus "Ca. Endomicrobiellum" Mies & Brune 2024 [Endomicrobium_A]
        - Genus Endomicrobium Zheng et al. 2018
        - Genus "Ca. Parendomicrobium" Mies & Brune 2024 [JAISKX01]
        - Genus "Ca. Praeruminimicrobium" Mies & Brune 2024 [JAHDQW01]
        - Genus "Ca. Proendomicrobium" Mies & Brune 2024 [WQVR01]
        - Genus "Ca. Proruminimicrobium" Mies & Brune 2024 [JAHDRN01]
        - Genus "Ca. Ruminimicrobiellum" Mies & Brune 2024 [RUG658]
        - Genus "Ca. Ruminimicrobium" Mies & Brune 2024 [RUG240]

== See also ==
- List of bacterial orders
- List of bacteria genera
