= Reticulitermes hageni =

Scientific classification
- Domain: Eukaryota
- Kingdom: Animalia
- Phylum: Arthropoda
- Class: Insecta
- Order: Blattodea
- Infraorder: Isoptera
- Genus: Reticulitermes
- Species: R. hageni

Binomial name
- Reticulitermes hageni Banks in Banks & Snyder, 1920

Species of termite

Reticulitermes hageni, the light southeastern subterranean termite, is a species of termite in the family Heterotermitidae. It is found in North America.
