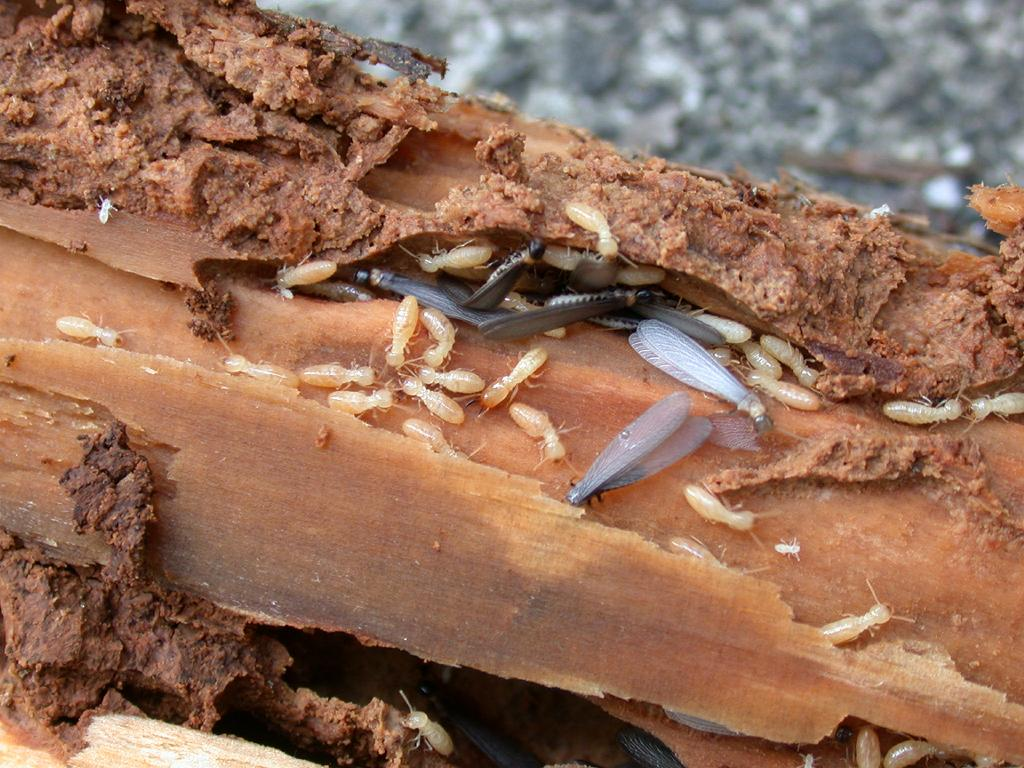

Scientific classification
- Kingdom: Animalia
- Phylum: Arthropoda
- Class: Insecta
- Order: Blattodea
- Infraorder: Isoptera
- Family: Heterotermitidae
- Genus: Reticulitermes
- Species: R. speratus

Binomial name
- Reticulitermes speratus (Kolbe, 1885)

= Reticulitermes speratus =

Species of termite

Reticulitermes speratus, the Japanese termite, is a species of subterranean termite found in Japan, North Korea, and South Korea. It eats decayed wood. It is adapted to withstand the cold temperatures of the temperate regions it inhabits.

The mitochondrial genome of the subspecies Reticulitermes speratus kyushuensis has been determined.

== Behavior ==
New colonies are typically founded by a male-female pair, but alternatively sometimes by a same-sex female pair, in which case reproduction is parthenogenetic. New incipient colonies may also be founded by same-sex male pairs. These male pairs of termites cannot reproduce, but by cooperating they are able to survive long enough that one or both has the potential to later replace a male in another colony. This male can then reproduce by mating with the female there .

The queen is succeeded by asexual reproduction, in which an aged queen lays eggs with no openings for sperm to enter through, effectively making a clone of herself. All individuals have part of their eyes developed, but the size increases if the individual is on a reproductive tract.

Individuals have been shown to cannibalize injured nestmates.

=== Queen longevity ===
R. speratus queens achieve a long lifespan without sacrificing fecundity. These queens have more than twice the catalase activity and seven times higher expression of the catalase gene RsCAT1 than workers, soldiers and nymphs. Catalase catalyses the decomposition of hydrogen peroxide, a reactive oxygen species. Thus catalase protects against oxidative stress and oxidative DNA damage. The extended longevity of R. speratus queens is likely due, in part, to efficient antioxidant capability.
