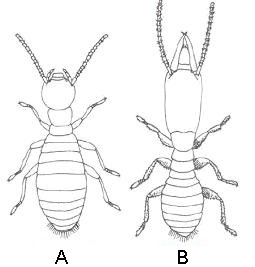
- Diagram showing the variations within the species. On the left is a soldier, and on the right is a worker.

Scientific classification
- Kingdom: Animalia
- Phylum: Arthropoda
- Clade: Pancrustacea
- Class: Insecta
- Order: Blattodea
- Infraorder: Isoptera
- Family: Heterotermitidae
- Genus: Reticulitermes
- Species: R. lucifugus

Binomial name
- Reticulitermes lucifugus (Rossi, 1792)

= Reticulitermes lucifugus =

Species of termite

Reticulitermes lucifugus is classified as a species of termite in the genus Reticulitermes. Its diet consists mainly of rotten timber and logs. It is found in the Provence region, Italy, and the Broadleaf woodlands of North America.
