= Elusimicrobium minutum =

Scientific classification
- Domain: Bacteria
- Kingdom: Pseudomonadati
- Phylum: Elusimicrobiota
- Class: Elusimicrobia; Geissinger et al. 2010
- Order: Elusimicrobiales; Geissinger et al. 2010
- Family: Elusimicrobiaceae; Geissinger et al. 2010
- Genus: Elusimicrobium; Geissinger et al. 2010
- Species: E. minutum

Binomial name
- Elusimicrobium minutum Geissinger et al. 2010

Species of bacterium

Elusimicrobium minutum is an ultramicrobacterium and first accepted member to be cultured of a major bacterial lineage previously known only as candidate phylum Termite Gut 1 (TG1), which has accordingly been renamed phylum Elusimicrobiota. It was isolated in the laboratory of Andreas Brune at the Max Planck Institute for Terrestrial Microbiology, from the scarab beetle. It is a mesophilic, obligately anaerobic ultramicrobacterium with a gram-negative cell envelope. Cells are typically rod shaped, but cultures are pleomorphic in all growth phases (0.3 to 2.5 μm long and 0.17 to 0.3 μm wide). The isolate grows heterotrophically on sugars and ferments D-galactose, D-glucose, D-fructose, D-glucosamine, and N-acetyl-D-glucosamine to acetate, ethanol, hydrogen, and alanine as major products but only if amino acids are present in the medium

== The genome of Elusimicrobium minutum ==
The 1.64 Mbp genome of E. minutum reveals the presences of several genes required for uptake and fermentation of sugars via the Embden–Meyerhof pathway, including several hydrogenases, and an unusual peptide degradation pathway comprising transamination reactions. It also reveals the presence of genes coding for peptidoglycan and lipopolysaccharide biosynthesis. The genome also seems to encode 60 PilE genes putatively involved in pilus assembly, polyketide synthesis, non-ribosomal peptide synthesis and many other still undiscovered metabolic traits.
