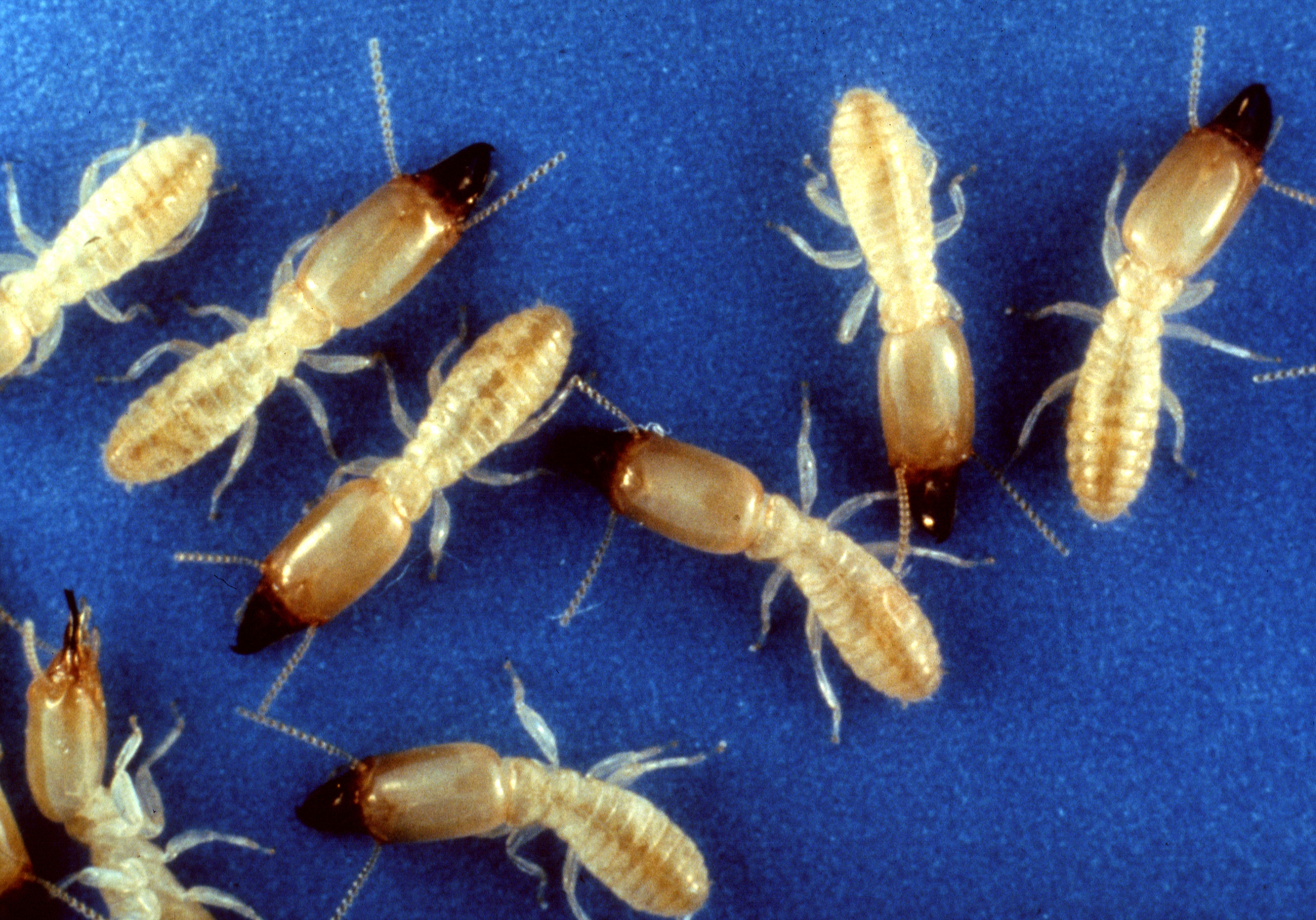
- Reticulitermes flavipes soldiers

Scientific classification
- Kingdom: Animalia
- Phylum: Arthropoda
- Clade: Pancrustacea
- Class: Insecta
- Order: Blattodea
- Infraorder: Isoptera
- Family: Heterotermitidae
- Genus: Reticulitermes; Holmgren, 1913

Species
- Reticulitermes amamianus Reticulitermes arenincola Reticulitermes balkanensis Reticulitermes banyulensis Reticulitermes chinensis Reticulitermes clypeatus Reticulitermes flavipes Reticulitermes grassei Reticulitermes guangzhouensis Reticulitermes hageni Reticulitermes hesperus Reticulitermes kanmonensis Reticulitermes khaoyaiensis Reticulitermes leptomandibularis Reticulitermes lucifugus Reticulitermes malletei Reticulitermes miyatakei Reticulitermes nelsonae Reticulitermes okinawanus Reticulitermes santonensis Reticulitermes speratus Reticulitermes tibialis Reticulitermes urbis Reticulitermes virginicus Reticulitermes yaeyamanus

Synonyms
- Maresa Giebel, 1856

= Reticulitermes =

Genus of termites

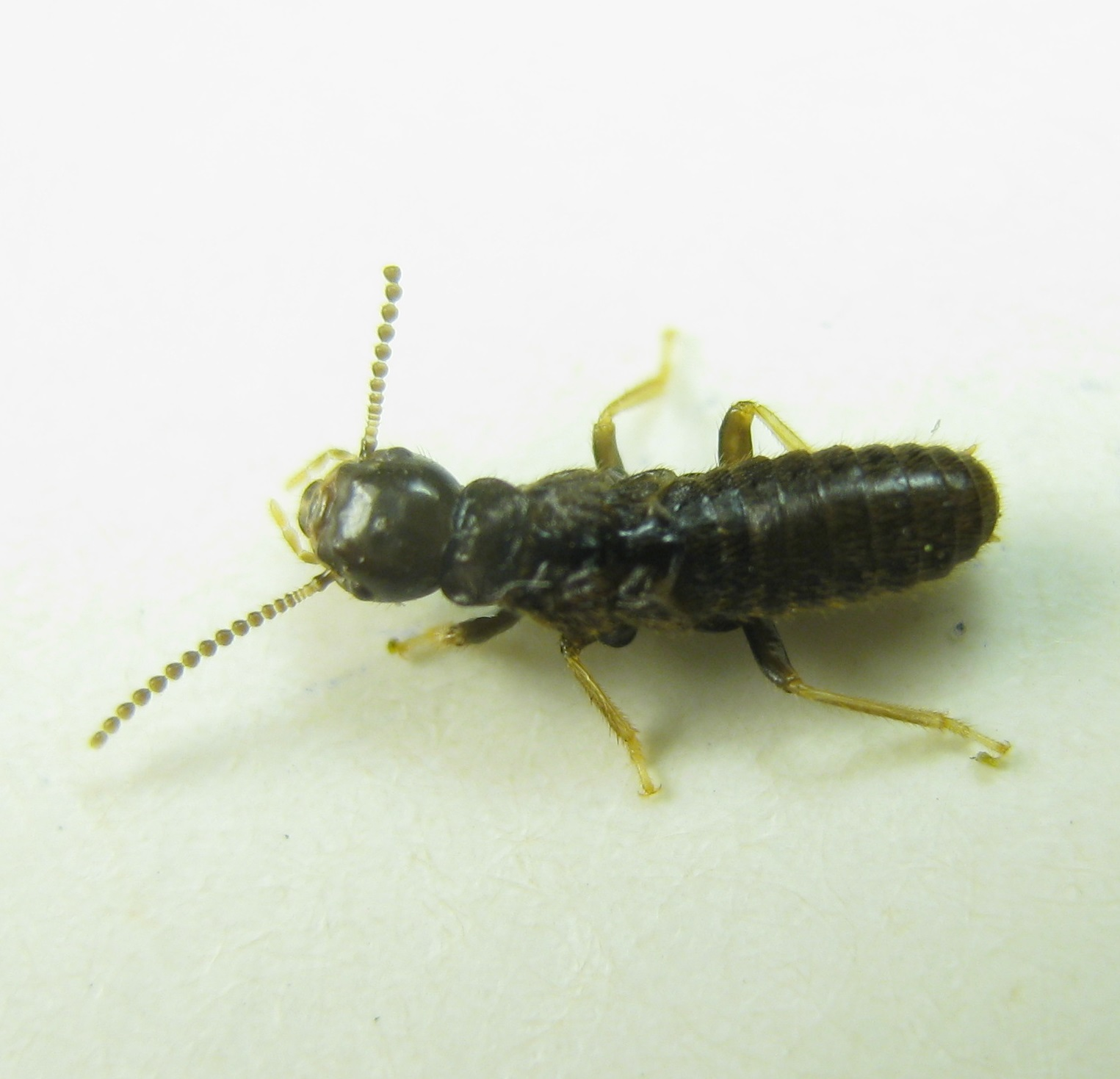
Reticulitermes sp.

Reticulitermes is a termite genus in the family Heterotermitidae. They are found in most temperate regions on Earth including much of Asia and Western Europe, and all of North America.

== Caste descriptions ==
Reticulitermes species have three general castes: reproductive, worker, and soldier.

=== Reproductive caste ===
In two Reticulitermes species, R. virginicus and R. speratus, mother-son breeding systems have been found. This means their colony members are more related to their mothers than their fathers since 50% of their genotype comes from their mother and 50% from their father who also shares 50% of his genotype with their shared mother. This has shown to bias female alate production over males, likely because colony members favor caring for those who they are most related to (see Kin Selection).

=== Worker caste ===
Reticulitermes species have bifurcated development and so they have a true worker caste, although workers retain a high level of plasticity and can become ergatoid reproductives due to the hemimetabolic nature of most termites. Those who do not can either become soldiers or stay workers. Workers typically focus on brood care and general nest management.

=== Soldier caste ===
The soldier caste of most Reticulitermes defend the nest by either using their mandibles to attack invaders or by using their large heads to plug the entrances to their nests. They are most well known for their defensive abilities, though they are known to do many other tasks, such as aiding colony reproduction by accompanying alates and stimulating the production of supplementary reproductives. Like other termite soldiers, they are unable to feed themselves due to their large mandibles.

Many species of Reticulitermes have sex biases in their soldier castes with significantly more female soldiers than males. Some species, like R. virginicus, have next to no male soldiers at all. This is believed to be caused by the sexual dimorphism in termites in which females have a larger size potential than males and the fact that soldiers need to be able to plug entrances with their large heads. However, in R. flavipes, where there is no sexual dimorphism in the reproductive caste, there is also no sex bias in soldier production.

== Distribution ==
=== In Europe ===
Reticulitermes flavipes (former santonensis) is found in western France, Reticulitermes grassei in southwestern France, northwestern and southern Spain and Portugal, Reticulitermes banyulensis in the Roussillon region of France and Reticulitermes lucifugus in the Provence region. The subspecies, Reticulitermes lucifugus corsicus is found in Corsica and Sardinia. Reticulitermes urbis, a newly described species is found in urban zones in the southeast of France (Marseille in the west to Italy in the east).

=== In Asia ===
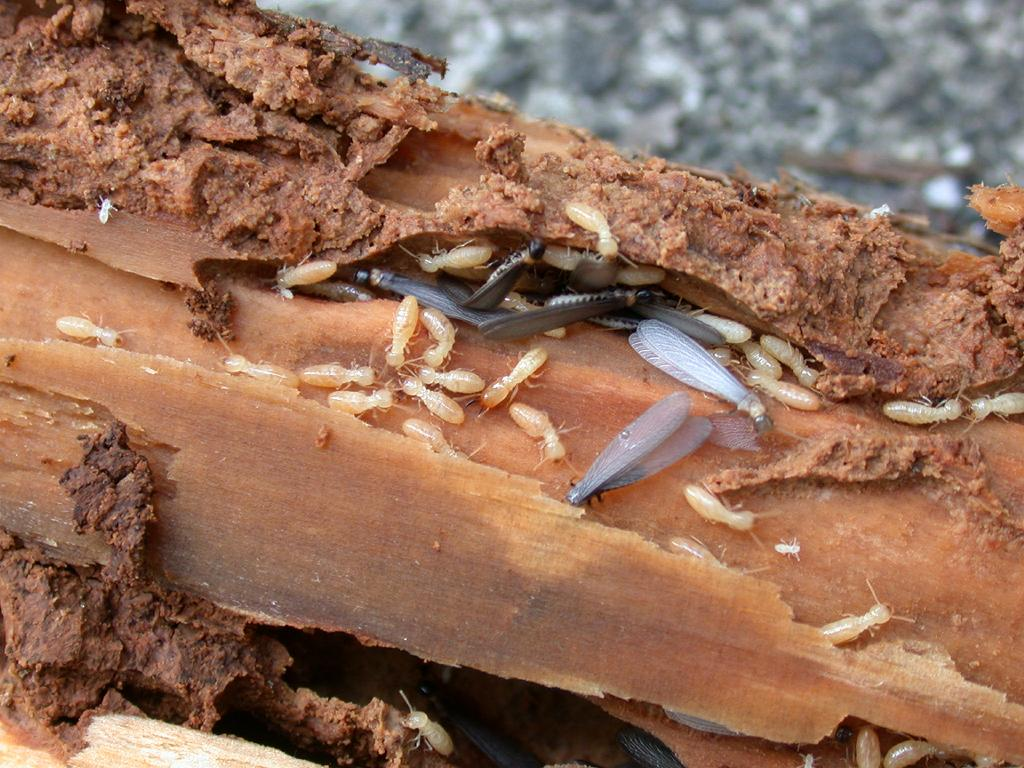
Nest of Reticulitermes speratus (Japan)

Reticulitermes clypeatus is found in Middle East.
Reticulitermes lucifugus is found in Turkey.
Reticulitermes chinensis, Reticulitermes guangzhouensis, Reticulitermes leptomandibularis and Reticulitermes khaoyaiensis are found in China.
Reticulitermes kanmonensis Korea, China and Japan.
Reticulitermes amamianus, Reticulitermes speratus, Reticulitermes miyatakei, Reticulitermes okinawanus and Reticulitermes yaeyamanus are found in Japan.
Reticulitermes arenincola is found in India.
Reticulitermes speratus is also found in all place in South Korea as well as Japan and North Korea

=== In North America ===
The eastern subterranean termite (Reticulitermes flavipes) is the most widely distributed termite found in the eastern United States. R. flavipes is commonly found in southern Ontario, and is found in all the eastern states including Texas, extending as far south as Mexico City and as far west as Arizona, with likely accidental introductions on the west coast of the US.

Other termites found there are the dark southeastern subterranean termite (Reticulitermes virginicus) and the light southeastern subterranean termite (Reticulitermes hageni). These are less important economically (such as in damage to crops) because of their more limited range.

Other termites species are found: Reticulitermes hesperus in California; Reticulitermes malletei in Mississippi; Reticulitermes nelsonae in Louisiana and Florida.

== In medical research ==
The extended longevity of social insect queens is of interest because it implies the presence of an anti-aging mechanism. Long-lived queens of Reticulitermes speratus have markedly less oxidative damage to their DNA than non-reproductive individuals (workers, soldiers and nymphs). Queens have more than twice the catalase activity and seven times higher levels of expression of the catalase gene RsCAT1 than workers, soldiers and nymphs. Catalase catalyzes the decomposition the reactive oxygen species hydrogen peroxide, and protects against oxidative stress. It appears that the extended longevity of R. speratus queens is partially explained by their efficient antioxidant capability.
