= Alate =

Winged reproductive caste from a social insect colony in its winged form

Alate (Latin ālātus, from āla (“wing”)) is an adjective and noun used in entomology and botany to refer to something that has wings or winglike structures.

== In entomology ==
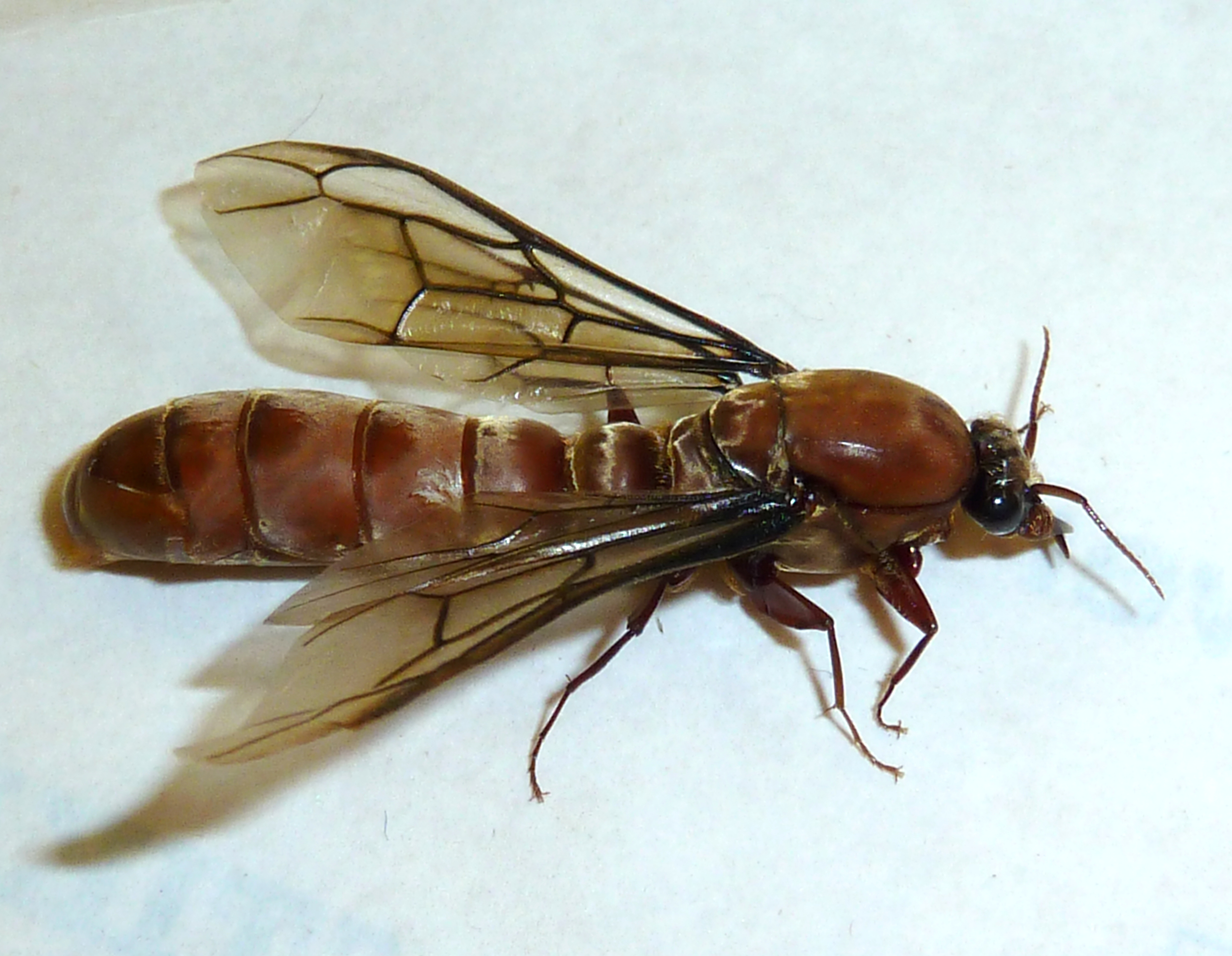
Dorylus male alate

In entomology, "alate" usually refers to the winged form of a social insect, especially ants or termites, though it can also be applied to aphids and some thrips.

Alate females are referred to as gynes, and are typically those destined to become queens. A "dealate" is an adult insect that shed or lost its wings ("dealation").

== In botany ==
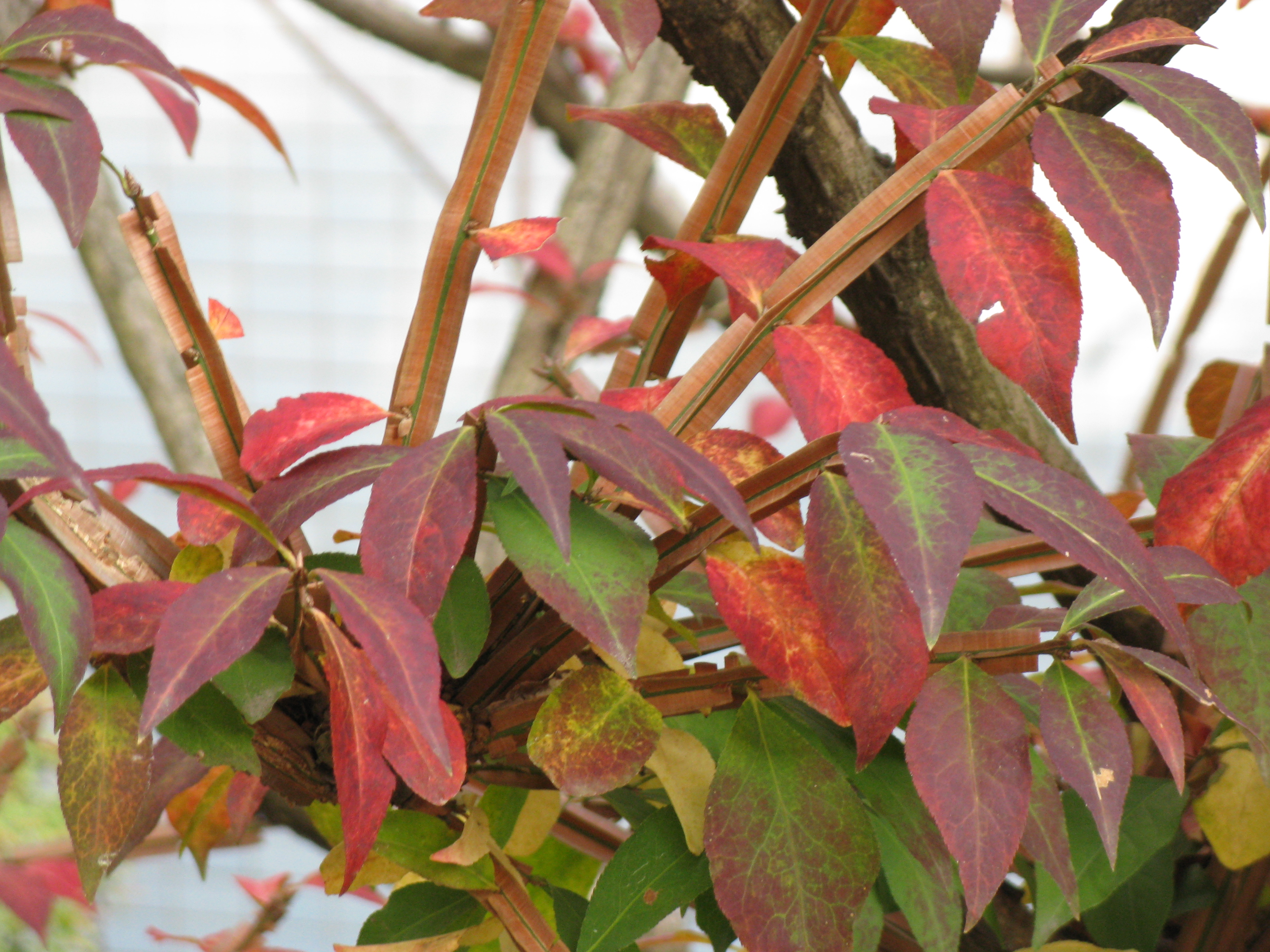
Euonymus alatus has wing-like structures on the stems

In botany, "alate" refers to wing-like structures on some seeds that use wind dispersal. It is also used to describe flattened ridges which run longitudinally on stems.
