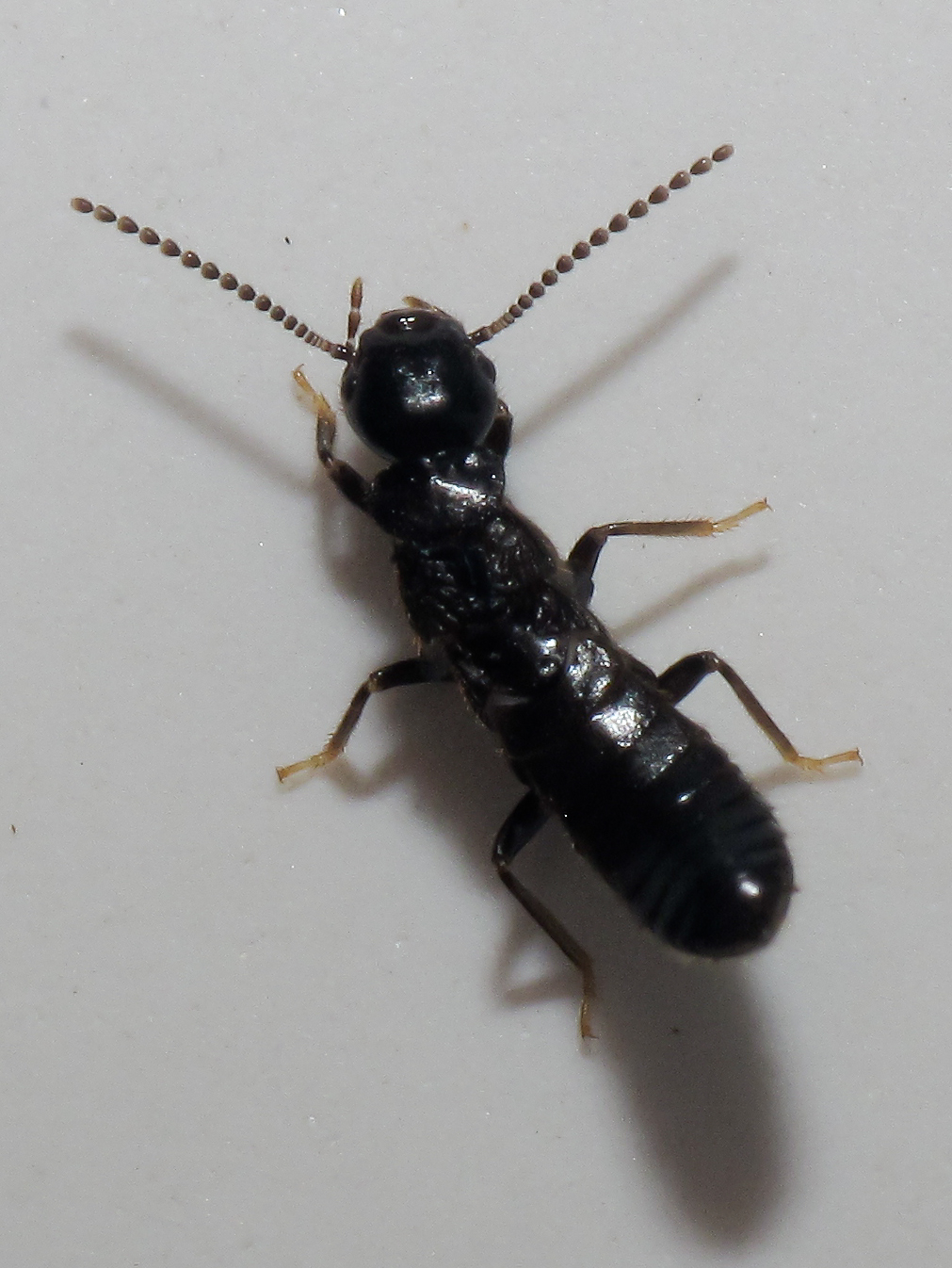
- Reticulitermes lucifugus imago

Scientific classification
- Kingdom: Animalia
- Phylum: Arthropoda
- Clade: Pancrustacea
- Class: Insecta
- Order: Blattodea
- Infraorder: Isoptera
- Nanorder: Geoisoptera
- Family: Heterotermitidae; Hellemans et al., 2024

Type genus
- Heterotermes Froggatt, 1897

= Heterotermitidae =

Family of termites

Heterotermitidae, or the Subterranean termites, is a family of termites that was elevated to family level from the subfamily Heterotermitinae, formerly nested in Rhinotermitidae. Recent cladistic analyses as of 2024 position Heterotermitidae as sister to the Termitidae, forming the clade Geoisoptera. This family includes the most economically significant termites, Reticulitermes, Heterotermes, and especially Coptotermes with C. formosanus in particular costing an estimated >$2.2 billion in annual damages within the United States alone. They primarily feed through the soil-wood interface, foraging for food through the soil and mud tubes. The nests of most species are typically diffuse subterranean galleries and tunnels, however Coptotermes is known to build more complex centralized nests built from carton, with some species building mounds.

== Genera ==
- Reticulitermes
- Heterotermes
- Coptotermes
