= Methanothrix =

Scientific classification
- Domain: Archaea
- Kingdom: Methanobacteriati
- Phylum: Methanobacteriota
- Class: "Methanomicrobia"
- Order: Methanosarcinales
- Family: Methanosaetaceae
- Genus: Methanothrix; Huser, Wuhrmann & Zehnder 1983 nom. nov.

Type species
- Methanothrix soehngenii Huser, Wuhrmann & Zehnder 1983

Species
- M. harundinacea; "Ca. M. paradoxum"; M. soehngenii; M. thermoacetophila

Synonyms
- Methanosaeta Patel and Sprott 1990

Genus of archaea

Methanothrix is a genus of methanogenic archaea within the phylum Methanobacteriota. Methanothrix cells were first isolated from a mesophilic sewage digester but have since been found in many anaerobic and aerobic environments. Methanothrix were originally understood to be obligate anaerobes that can survive exposure to high concentrations of oxygen, but recent studies have shown at least one Candidatus operational taxonomic unit proposed to be in the Methanothrix genus not only survives but remains active in oxic soils. This proposed species, Ca. Methanothrix paradoxum, is frequently found in methane-releasing ecosystems and is the dominant methanogen in oxic soils.

Methanothrix are non-motile rod-shaped cells which connect together to form long filaments. These filaments are enclosed in a proteinaceous sheath. Methanothrix species, like their close relative Methanosarcina barkeri, have membranes entirely composed of diphytanylglycerol diethers.

== Phylogeny ==
The currently accepted taxonomy is based on the List of Prokaryotic names with Standing in Nomenclature (LPSN) and National Center for Biotechnology Information (NCBI).

16S rRNA based LTP_07_2026

- Methanothrix
  - M. harundinacea (Ma, Liu & Dong 2006) Akinyemi et al. 2021
  - - M. soehngenii
    - M. thermoacetophila

53 marker proteins based GTDB 11-RS232

- - "Methanocrinis"
    - "M. harundinaceus" (Ma, Liu & Dong 2006) Khomyakova et al. 2023
    - - "Ca. M. alkalitolerans" Khomyakova et al. 2023
      - "Ca. M. natronophilus" Khomyakova et al. 2023
  - Methanothrix
    - M. soehngenii Huser, Wuhrmann & Zehnder 1983 (incl. Methanosaeta concilii)
    - M. thermoacetophila corrig. Nozhevnikova & Chudina 1988 (incl. M. thermophila)

== Metabolism ==
Methanothrix species use acetate and carbon dioxide as carbon substrates.

When using acetate, Methanothrix species use an incomplete citric acid cycle in the oxidative direction. After formation of acetyl-CoA, the carbon-carbon bond of acetate is cleaved by a carbon monoxide dehydrogenase/acetyl-CoA synthase enzyme. The methyl moiety is transferred through multiple complexes until it is finally reduced to methane by a methyl-CoM reductase.

Methanothrix species have been observed receiving electrons to reduce carbon dioxide to methane through direct interspecies electron transfer (DIET) with Geobacter species. Geobacter sulfurreducens transfers electrons into Methanothrix cells using electrically conductive pili.

== Microbial Ecology ==
Compared to the acetotrophic Methanosarcina species, Methanothrix species have lower Monod Equation parameters. Methanothrix have slower maximum growth rates and smaller half-saturation coefficients due to differences in the genera's aceticlastic pathways. Consequently, when acetate concentrations are high, Methanothrix species are likely to be outcompeted by Methanosarcina, which can utilize the available substrate faster. However, in low acetate environments, Methanothrix species will dominate due to their lower minimum threshold for acetate. This expectation is consistent with observations of abundant Methanothrix in low-acetate ecosystems across the world.

Because Methanothrix species are well adapted to survive exposure to oxygen and thrive using either acetate or carbon dioxide as a carbon substrate, they are thought to be one of the largest microbial contributors to methanogenesis on Earth.

== See also ==
- List of Archaea genera
