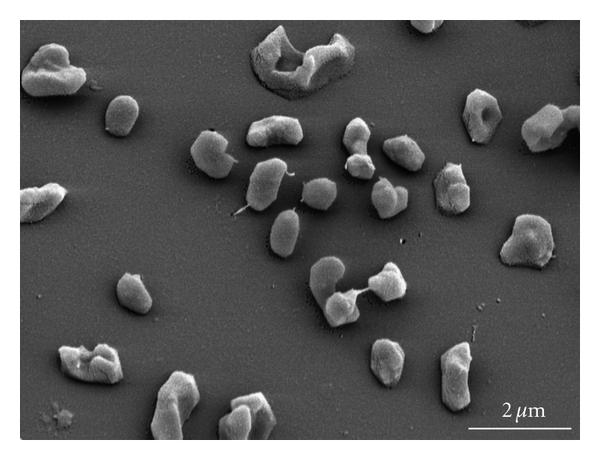
- Scanning electron microscope image of Mhp. mahii SLP

Scientific classification
- Domain: Archaea
- Kingdom: Methanobacteriati
- Phylum: Methanobacteriota
- Class: "Methanomicrobia"
- Order: Methanosarcinales
- Family: Methanosarcinaceae
- Genus: Methanohalophilus
- Species: M. mahii

Binomial name
- Methanohalophilus mahii Paterek and Smith (1988)

= Methanohalophilus mahii =

Species of archaeon

Methanohalophilus mahii (also known as Mhp. mahii) is an obligately anaerobic, methylotrophic, methanogenic cocci-shaped archaeon of the genus Methanohalophilus that can be found in high salinity aquatic environments. The name Methanohalophilus is said to be derived from methanum meaning "methane" in Latin; halo meaning "salt" in Greek; and mahii meaning "of Mah" in Latin, after R.A. Mah, who did substantial amounts of research on aerobic and methanogenic microbes. The proper word in ancient Greek for "salt" is however hals (ἅλς). The specific strain type was designated SLP (= ATCC 35705) and is currently the only identified strain of this species.

== Phylogeny ==
There are a total of four species in the genus Methanohalophilus including Methanohalophilus mahii, Methanohalophilus halophilus, Methanohalophilus portucalensis, and Methanohalophilus euhalobius. The closest relative, Methanohalophilus portucalensis, has a 99.8% similarity in sequence across the whole genome to Methanohalophilus mahii. The other Methanohalophilus species have less than a 94.7% similarity to Methanohalophilus mahii. All species in the genus are halophilic methanogens that contribute to marine ecosystem mineral cycling.

== Discovery ==
In 1988, Robert Paterek and Paul Smith were searching for methanogenic bacteria in the Great Salt Lake in Utah when they first discovered the archaeon Methanohalophilus mahii in its anoxic sediments. Sediment samples were collected and stored in plexiglas tubes, and sub-core samples taken with a brass cork borer and transferred to fifty milliliter serum bottles. All samples were processed within forty-eight hours of collection. The media used for isolation of Methanohalophilus mahii colonies was prepared using the Hungate technique for proper isolation of anaerobic microbes. Serial dilutions were prepared in a 1:10 ratio, and agar roll tubes were inoculated and incubated at 30 °C for eight weeks. Isolated methanogenic colonies were chosen by identifying those with a foamy texture, denoting gas release, and repeatedly diluted and inoculated on agar roll tubes until only one type of colony morphology remained. These colonies appeared as cream to pale yellow-colored circular-shaped colonies with an overall foamy texture due to gas release.

=== Cell Culture ===
Several analyses were done to determine cell characteristics. Methanohalophilus mahii is classified as a moderate halophile, or an organism that can grow in high salinity environments, since it can grow anywhere from a 0.5 to 3.5 M NaCl (about 30-200 g/L) range, with an optimal growth concentration at 2.0 M (about 115-120 g/L) NaCl, but with a 1.2 M NaCl (about 70 g/L) concentration yielding the highest culture density. It can also grow in varying pH levels ranging from 6.5 to 8.2, with an optimum pH of 7.5. Methanohalophilus mahii is a mesophile, or an organism that thrives at moderate temperatures, and grows best at a temperature of 37 °C.

=== Cell Structure ===
Methanohalophilus mahii cells stain Gram negative, and are non-motile, irregular cocci approximately 0.8 to 1.8 micrometers in diameter. Additionally, the cells fluoresce under 420 nanometer light. Membrane phospholipids are composed of β-hydroxyarchaeol cores, glucose glycolipids, and ethanolamine, glycerol, and myo-inositol polar head groups.

== Metabolism ==
Methanohalophilus mahii is an obligately anaerobic methylotrophic and methanogenic chemoheterotroph, able to reduce single-carbon compounds and multi-carbon compounds given that there are no carbon-carbon double bonds present. Trace amounts of Mg^{2}^{+}, K^{+}, Ca^{2+}, and Fe^{2+} ions are required for methanogenic growth. Methanol can be used independently as a carbon source, and the Embden-Meyerhof-Parnas (EMP) glycolytic pathway can be utilized for catabolic processes. Possible electron donors include methanol, methylamines, dimethylamines, and trimethylamines. Methanohalophilus mahii is capable of utilizing several metabolic pathways to either reduce or oxidize methyl groups, creating either methane or carbon dioxide in the process. In the reductive methylotrophic methanogenic pathway, Methanohalophilus mahii can eventually reduce a methyl group to a methane, which is released. In the oxidative methylotrophic pathway, the methyl group is instead oxidized to carbon dioxide and released. This process directly contributes to carbon mineralization in marine ecosystems.

== Genome ==
Methanohalophilus mahii's genome was sequenced through shotgun sequencing using a 6.8 kilobase Sanger DNA library. The complete genome size was determined to be 2,012,424 base pairs long, with 2,906 total genes, and 2,032 actual protein-coding genes. The sequence had a 42.6% GC content, and forty-five pseudogenes were located.

== Importance ==
Methanohalophilus mahii has a unique suppressor tRNA with a modified pyrrolysine, an amino acid that is most commonly found in prokaryotes, that can recognize and bind to the amber STOP codon (UAG) which is also coded for by the genes used for methylamine methyltransferases. This species was also the first member to have its genome completely sequenced in the genus Methanohalophilus[1], which comprises mildly halophilic, methylotrophic methanogens. These archaea in general are known to greatly contribute to the carbon mineralization process in marine ecosystems. Specifically, the oxidative methylotrophic pathway Methanohalophilus mahii utilizes allows the species to oxidize methane to carbon dioxide, which, in turn, is used by other plants and organisms. This mineral cycling process allows for more growth and diversity in the ocean.
