= Methanogenium boonei =

Scientific classification
- Domain: Archaea
- Kingdom: Methanobacteriati
- Phylum: Methanobacteriota
- Class: "Methanomicrobia"
- Order: Methanomicrobiales
- Family: Methanomicrobiaceae
- Genus: Methanogenium
- Species: M. boonei

Binomial name
- Methanogenium boonei Kendall et al. 2007

Species of archaeon

Methanogenium boonei is a methanogenic archaean. Cells are non-motile irregular cocci 1.0–2.5 μm in diameter. This mesophile grows optimally at 19.4 °C, pH6.4–7.8, salinity 0.3–0.5M Na^{+}. It was first isolated from Skan Bay, Alaska.

== Description and metabolism ==
The cells are irregular and coccoid in shape, non-motile, approximately 1.0–2.5 μm in diameter. These mesophiles grow optimally at a temperature of 19.4 °C, pH 6.4–7.8 and salinity of 0.3–0.5 M Na^{+}. This is a strictly anaerobic species, and individuals can use carbon dioxide with hydrogen or formate as substrates to produce methane.
