= Methanoculleus hydrogenitrophicus =

Scientific classification
- Domain: Archaea
- Kingdom: Methanobacteriati
- Phylum: Methanobacteriota
- Class: "Methanomicrobia"
- Order: Methanomicrobiales
- Family: Methanomicrobiaceae
- Genus: Methanoculleus
- Species: M. hydrogenitrophicus

Binomial name
- Methanoculleus hydrogenitrophicus Tian et al. 2010

Species of archaeon

Methanoculleus hydrogenitrophicus is a methanogen.
