= Methanolobus tindarius =

Scientific classification
- Domain: Archaea
- Kingdom: Methanobacteriati
- Phylum: Methanobacteriota
- Class: "Methanomicrobia"
- Order: Methanosarcinales
- Family: Methanosarcinaceae
- Genus: Methanolobus
- Species: M. tindarius

Binomial name
- Methanolobus tindarius König and Stetter 1982

Species of archaeon

Methanolobus tindarius is a methanogen archaeon. It is marine, mesophilic, coccoid, lobal and monotrichous flagellated. They were isolated from coastal sediments.
