= Methanococcoides methylutens =

Scientific classification
- Domain: Archaea
- Kingdom: Methanobacteriati
- Phylum: Methanobacteriota
- Class: "Methanomicrobia"
- Order: Methanosarcinales
- Family: Methanosarcinaceae
- Genus: Methanococcoides
- Species: M. methylutens

Binomial name
- Methanococcoides methylutens Sowers and Ferry 1985

Species of archaeon

Methanococcoides methylutens is a methylotrophic marine methanogen, the type species of its genus. It utilises trimethylamine, diethylamine, monomethylamine, and methanol as substrates for growth and methanogenesis. Cells are non-motile, non-spore-forming, irregular cocci 1 μm in diameter which stain Gram-negative and occur singly or in pairs. TMA-10 is the type strain (ATCC 33938).

== Genome ==
The genome has 15 contigs, 2,508,511 base pairs, and GC content of approximately 42.5%.
