= Methanocalculus halotolerans =

Scientific classification
- Domain: Archaea
- Kingdom: Methanobacteriati
- Phylum: Methanobacteriota
- Class: "Methanomicrobia"
- Order: Methanomicrobiales
- Family: Methanocorpusculaceae
- Genus: Methanocalculus
- Species: M. halotolerans

Binomial name
- Methanocalculus halotolerans Ollivier et al. 1998

Species of archaeon

Methanocalculus halotolerans is a species of archaeon, the type species of its genus. It is an irregular coccoid hydrogenotrophic methanogen. Its type strain is SEBR 4845^{T} (= OCM 470^{T}).

== Nomenclature ==
The name "Methanocalculus" has Latin roots, "methano" for methane and "calculus" for small round structure, "halo" for salt and "tolerans" for tolerant. In all, the name means salt-tolerant organism with a gravelly body that produces methane.
