= Methanogenium marinum =

Scientific classification
- Domain: Archaea
- Kingdom: Methanobacteriati
- Phylum: Methanobacteriota
- Class: "Methanomicrobia"
- Order: Methanomicrobiales
- Family: Methanomicrobiaceae
- Genus: Methanogenium
- Species: M. marinum

Binomial name
- Methanogenium marinum Chong et al., 2002

Species of archaeon

Methanogenium marinum is a psychrophilic, H2-using methanogen from Skan Bay, Alaska. Its cells are highly irregular, non-motile coccoids (diameter, 1 to 1.2 μm), occurring singly. AK-1 is its type strain.

== Morphology ==
The cells are highly irregular and coccoid in shape and non-motile, 1 to 1.2 μm in diameter. Like other species within the genus Methanogenium, they are strictly anaerobic.
