= Methanolobus profundi =

Scientific classification
- Domain: Archaea
- Kingdom: Methanobacteriati
- Phylum: Methanobacteriota
- Class: "Methanomicrobia"
- Order: Methanosarcinales
- Family: Methanosarcinaceae
- Genus: Methanolobus
- Species: M. profundi

Binomial name
- Methanolobus profundi Mochimaru et al. 2009

Species of archaeon

Methanolobus profundi is a mesophilic, methylotrophic methanogen archaeon. The type strain is MobM^{T} (=DSM 21213^{T} =NBRC 104158^{T}). It was isolated from a deep subsurface gas field.
