= Methanogenium frigidum =

Scientific classification
- Domain: Archaea
- Kingdom: Methanobacteriati
- Phylum: Methanobacteriota
- Class: "Methanomicrobia"
- Order: Methanomicrobiales
- Family: Methanomicrobiaceae
- Genus: Methanogenium
- Species: M. frigidum

Binomial name
- Methanogenium frigidum Franzmann et al., 1997

Species of archaeon

Methanogenium frigidum is a psychrophilic, H2-using methanogen from Ace Lake, Antarctica.

== Description and metabolism ==
Cells are psychrophilic, irregular, slightly halophilic and non-motile coccoids (diameter 1.2 to 2.5 μm). They require salt to grow. They prefer low temperatures: their optimal temperature is 15 °C, and they cannot grow at 18 °C–20 °C. They reduce carbon dioxide with hydrogen to produce methane, but it may be possible that they use other substrates as well. One experiment showed that these cells grow best in the presence of yeast extract.

== Genome ==
The genome of this species differs from those of archaea that prefer higher temperatures. It contains more polar amino acids, particularly Gln and Thr, and fewer non-polar ones, particularly Leu. Unlike hyperthermophiles, in psychrophiles, the GC content is the most important factor to the stability of the tRNA.
