= Methanoculleus submarinus =

Scientific classification
- Domain: Archaea
- Kingdom: Methanobacteriati
- Phylum: Methanobacteriota
- Class: "Methanomicrobia"
- Order: Methanomicrobiales
- Family: Methanomicrobiaceae
- Genus: Methanoculleus
- Species: M. submarinus

Binomial name
- Methanoculleus submarinus Mikucki et al. 2003

Species of archaeon

Methanoculleus submarinus is a methanogen. It is non-motile and highly irregular coccoid-shaped (with average diameter of 0.8-2 μm). Nankai-1 is its type strain.
