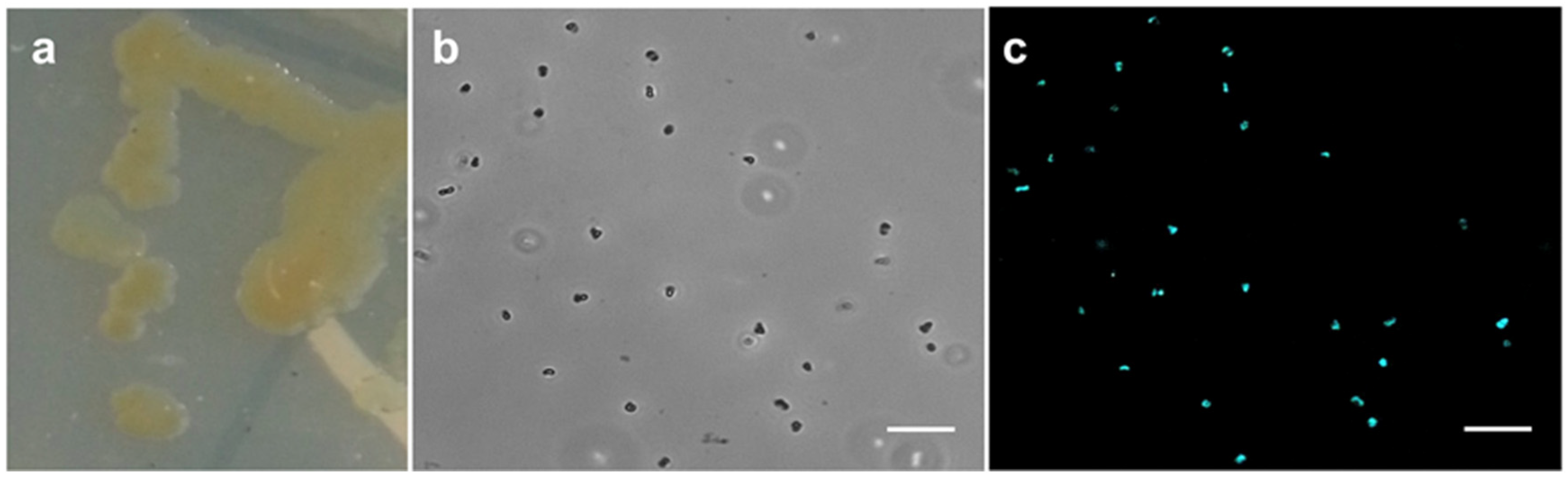
- Methanoculleus bourgensis strain E02.3

Scientific classification
- Domain: Archaea
- Kingdom: Methanobacteriati
- Phylum: Methanobacteriota
- Class: "Methanomicrobia"
- Order: Methanomicrobiales
- Family: Methanomicrobiaceae
- Genus: Methanoculleus; Maestrojun et al. 1990

Type species
- Methanoculleus bourgensis corrig. (Ollivier et al. 1986) Maestrojun et al. 1990

Species
- See text

= Methanoculleus =

Genus of archaea

Methanoculleus is a genus of microbes within the family Methanomicrobiaceae. The species of the genus Methanoculleus live in marine environments brackish water, and are very common in bioreactors, landfills, and wastewater. Unlike other archaea, Methanoculleus and some species of related genera can use ethanol and some secondary alcohols as electron donors as they produce methane. This has implications as the production of methane as a greenhouse gas and consequences with respect to global climate change.

== Phylogeny ==
The currently accepted taxonomy is based on the List of Prokaryotic names with Standing in Nomenclature (LPSN) and National Center for Biotechnology Information (NCBI).

16S rRNA based LTP_07_2026

- Methanoculleus
  - M. taiwanensis
  - - M. bourgensis
    - - M. receptaculi
      - - - M. hydrogenitrophicus Tian, Wang & Dong 2010
          - M. thermophilus
        - - M. palmolei
          - - - M. chikugoensis
              - M. horonobensis
            - - M. sediminis
              - - M. marisnigri (Romesser et al. 1981) Maestrojun et al. 1990
                - M. submarinus Mikucki et al. 2003

53 marker proteins based GTDB 11-RS232

- Methanoculleus
  - - M. frigidifontis Lai et al. 2024
    - M. taiwanensis Weng et al. 2015
  - - M. receptaculi Cheng et al. 2008
    - - M. thermophilus corrig. (Rivard & Smith 1982) Maestrojuan et al. 1990
      - - - M. caldifontis Lai et al. 2024
          - - M. palmolei Zellner et al. 1998
            - - M. bourgensis corrig. (Ollivier et al. 1986) Maestrojun et al. 1990
              - "Ca. M. thermohydrogenotrophicus" corrig. Kougias et al. 2017
        - - - M. nereidis Lai et al. 2024
            - M. oceani Lai et al. 2024
          - - - M. chikugoensis Dianou et al. 2001
              - M. formosensis Lai et al. 2024
            - - M. horonobensis Shimizu et al. 2013
              - - M. methanifontis Lai et al. 2024
                - - M. marisnigri [incl.M. submarinus]
                  - M. sediminis Chen et al. 2015

Species incertae sedis:

- "Ca. M. ammoniitolerans" Weng et al. 2024
- "M. bovis" Trubitsyn et al. 2025

== See also ==
- List of Archaea genera
