= Methanomethylovorans thermophila =

Scientific classification
- Domain: Archaea
- Kingdom: Methanobacteriati
- Phylum: Methanobacteriota
- Class: "Methanomicrobia"
- Order: Methanosarcinales
- Family: Methanosarcinaceae
- Genus: Methanomethylovorans
- Species: M. thermophila

Binomial name
- Methanomethylovorans thermophila Lomans et al. 2004

Species of archaeon

Methanomethylovorans thermophila is a species of thermophilic, methylotrophic methanogenic microbe. It is Gram-negative, and its type strain is L2FAW^{T} (=DSM 17232^{T} =ATCC BAA-1173^{T}). It was isolated from an anaerobic reactor in a laboratory. Its cells are Gram-negative, non-motile, and coccoid in form. It has been found to use methanol and methyl amines as substrates in the production of methane. It cannot use formiate, carbon dioxide with hydrogen, acetate, dimethyl sulfide, methanethiol, or propanol. As its name suggests, it is a thermophile, with an optimal growth temperature of 50 °C.
