= Methanomethylovorans hollandica =

Scientific classification
- Domain: Archaea
- Kingdom: Methanobacteriati
- Phylum: Methanobacteriota
- Class: "Methanomicrobia"
- Order: Methanosarcinales
- Family: Methanosarcinaceae
- Genus: Methanomethylovorans
- Species: M. hollandica

Binomial name
- Methanomethylovorans hollandica Lomans et al. 2004

Species of archaeon

Methanomethylovorans hollandica is a species of methylotrophic methanogen able to grow on dimethyl sulfide and methanethiol. It is the type species of its genus. It is obligately anaerobic. It was the first strictly anaerobic archaeon isolated from freshwater sediments in which dimethyl sulfide is the sole source of carbon. It is not a halophile. It can use methyl compounds as substrates, but it cannot use carbon dioxide or acetate. Because dimethyl sulfide has implications with respect to global warming, this organism may be of considerable importance.
