= Methanoplanus endosymbiosus =

Scientific classification
- Domain: Archaea
- Kingdom: Methanobacteriati
- Phylum: Methanobacteriota
- Class: "Methanomicrobia"
- Order: Methanomicrobiales
- Family: Methanomicrobiaceae
- Genus: Methanoplanus
- Species: M. endosymbiosus

Binomial name
- Methanoplanus endosymbiosus van Bruggen et al. 1986

Species of archaeon

Methanoplanus endosymbiosus is a species of archaeon, an endosymbiont of the marine sapropelic ciliate Metopus contortus. It is an irregular, disc-shaped bacterium with a diameter of 1.6–3.4 μms and type strain MC1. Its 16S DNA was sequenced in 1994, eight years after the initial isolation, and it was found to share considerable similarity with that of Methanoplanus limicola.
