= Methanomicrobium =

Scientific classification
- Domain: Archaea
- Kingdom: Methanobacteriati
- Phylum: Methanobacteriota
- Class: "Methanomicrobia"
- Order: Methanomicrobiales
- Family: Methanomicrobiaceae
- Genus: Methanomicrobium; Balch and Wolfe 1981

Type species
- Methanomicrobium mobile (Paynter & Hungate 1968) Balch and Wolfe 1981

Species
- M. antiquum; M. mobile

Synonyms
- Methanoeremita Zhou et al. 2024

Genus of archaea

Methanomicrobium is a genus of archaeans in the family Methanomicrobiaceae. The cells are shaped like short bars and do not form endospores. They produce methane via the reduction of carbon dioxide with hydrogen or formate. They cannot metabolize acetate, methylamines, or methanol.

== See also ==
- List of Archaea genera
