= Methanohalobium =

Scientific classification
- Domain: Archaea
- Kingdom: Methanobacteriati
- Phylum: Methanobacteriota
- Class: "Methanomicrobia"
- Order: Methanosarcinales
- Family: Methanosarcinaceae
- Genus: Methanohalobium; Zhilina and Zavarzin 1988

Type species
- Methanohalobium evestigatum corrig. Zhilina and Zavarzin 1988

Species
- M. evestigatum

Genus of archaea

Methanohalobium is a genus of archaeans in the family Methanosarcinaceae. Its genome has been sequenced. The genus contains one species, M. evestigatum.

The species are strictly anaerobic and live solely through the production of methane through the reduction of carbon dioxide with hydrogen or using methyl compounds as substrates. These species are only somewhat halophilic but extremely thermophilic.

== See also ==
- List of Archaea genera
