= Methanocorpusculum =

Scientific classification
- Domain: Archaea
- Kingdom: Methanobacteriati
- Phylum: Methanobacteriota
- Class: "Methanomicrobia"
- Order: Methanomicrobiales
- Family: Methanocorpusculaceae
- Genus: Methanocorpusculum; Zellner et al. 1988

Type species
- Methanocorpusculum parvum Zellner et al. 1988

Species
- M. aggregans; "Ca. M. equi"; "Ca. M. faecipullorum"; M. labreanum; "M. petauri"; M. sinense; "M. vombati"

Synonyms
- "Methanorbis" Protasov & Brune 2023

Genus of archaea

Methanocorpusculum is a genus of Archaea within the family Methanocorpusculaceae. The species within Methanocorpusculum were first isolated from biodisgester wastewater and activated sludge from anaerobic digestors. In nature, they live in freshwater environments. Unlike most other methanogenic archaea, they do not require high temperatures or extreme salt concentrations to live and grow.

== Nomenclature ==
The name Methanocorpusculum has Latin roots. It means bodies that produce methane.

== Description and metabolism ==
The cells of these archaea are small, irregular, and coccoid in shape. They stain Gram-negative and are not very motile. They reduce carbon dioxide to methane using hydrogen, but they can also use formate or secondary alcohols. They cannot use acetate or methylamines. They grow fastest at temperatures of 30–40 °C.

== Phylogeny ==
The currently accepted taxonomy is based on the List of Prokaryotic names with Standing in Nomenclature (LPSN) and National Center for Biotechnology Information (NCBI).

16S rRNA based LTP_07_2026

- Methanocorpusculum
  - M. labreanum
  - - M. aggregans
    - - M. bavaricum Zellner et al. 1989
      - M. sinense Zellner et al. 1989

53 marker proteins based GTDB 11-RS232

- Methanocorpusculum
  - - "Ca. M. equi" Gilroy et al. 2022
    - - M. aggregans (Ollivier et al. 1985) Xun, Boone & Mah 1989
        (incl. M. bavaricum)
      - M. labreanum Zhao et al. 1989
  - - "Methanorbis basalitermitum" Protasov & Brune 2023
    - - - "Methanorbis furvi" Protasov & Brune 2023
        - "Methanorbis rubei" Protasov & Brune 2023
      - - "Ca. M. faecipullorum" Gilroy et al. 2021
        - - "M. petauri" Volmer et al. 2023
          - "M. vombati" Volmer et al. 2023

== See also ==
- List of Archaea genera
