= Thermosyntropha lipolytica =

Scientific classification
- Domain: Bacteria
- Kingdom: Bacillati
- Phylum: Bacillota
- Class: Clostridia
- Order: Syntrophomonadales
- Family: Syntrophomonadaceae
- Genus: Thermosyntropha
- Species: T. lipolytica

Binomial name
- Thermosyntropha lipolytica Svetlitshnyi et al. 1996

Species of bacterium

Thermosyntropha lipolytica is a lipolytic, anaerobic, alkalitolerant, thermophilic bacteria. It lives in syntrophic coculture with a methanogen. Its cells are non-motile, non-spore forming, straight or slightly curved rods. Its type strain is JW/VS-265^{T} (=DSM 11003).
