= Methanogenium =

Scientific classification
- Domain: Archaea
- Kingdom: Methanobacteriati
- Phylum: Methanobacteriota
- Class: "Methanomicrobia"
- Order: Methanomicrobiales
- Family: Methanomicrobiaceae
- Genus: Methanogenium; Romesser et al. 1981

Type species
- Methanogenium cariaci Romesser et al. 1981

Species
- "M. boonei"; M. cariaci; M. frigidum; M. marinum; M. organophilum

Genus of archaea

Methanogenium is a genus of archaeans in the family Methanomicrobiaceae. The type species is Methanogenium cariaci.

== Description and habitat ==
The species within Methanogenium are coccoid in shape and Gram-negatives and, like other methanogenic archaea, they produce methane from carbon dioxide, hydrogen or formate as substrates. Although they occasionally have flagella, they are non-motile. They are strictly anaerobic, and can be found in marine and lake sediments that lack oxygen.

== Phylogeny ==
The currently accepted taxonomy is based on the List of Prokaryotic names with Standing in Nomenclature (LPSN) and National Center for Biotechnology Information (NCBI).

16S rRNA based LTP_07_2026

- Methanogenium
  - M. organophilum Widdel, Rouviere & Wolfe 1989
  - - M. frigidum Franzmann et al. 1997
    - - M. cariaci Widdel, Rouviere & Wolfe 1989
      - M. marinum Chong et al. 2003

53 marker proteins based GTDB 11-RS232

- Methanogenium
  - M. organophilum
  - - M. cariaci
    - M. marinum

== See also ==
- List of Archaea genera
