= Methanosaeta concilii =

Scientific classification
- Domain: Archaea
- Kingdom: Methanobacteriati
- Phylum: Methanobacteriota
- Class: "Methanomicrobia"
- Order: Methanosarcinales
- Family: Methanosaetaceae
- Genus: Methanosaeta
- Species: M. concilii

Binomial name
- Methanosaeta concilii (Patel 1985) Patel & Sprott 1990

Synonyms
- Methanothrix concilii Patel 1985; Methanothrix soehngenii Huser, Wuhrmann & Zehnder 1983

Species of archaeon

Methanosaeta concilii is an archaeum in the disputed genus Methanosaeta. It is obligately anaerobic, gram-negative and non-motile. It is rod-shaped (length 2.5 to 6.0 μm) with flat ends. The cells are enclosed within a cross-striated sheath. The type strain is GP6 (= DSM 3671 = OGC 69 = NRC 2989 = ATCC 35969). Its genome has been sequenced.

== See also ==
- List of Archaea genera
