= Methanosalsum =

Scientific classification
- Domain: Archaea
- Kingdom: Methanobacteriati
- Phylum: Methanobacteriota
- Class: "Methanomicrobia"
- Order: Methanosarcinales
- Family: Methanosarcinaceae
- Genus: Methanosalsum; Boone and Baker 2002

Type species
- Methanosalsum zhilinae (Mathrani et al. 1988) Boone & Baker 2002

Species
- M. natronophilum; M. zhilinae

Genus of archaea

Methanosalsum is a genus of microbes within the family Methanosarcinaceae. This genus contains two species.

Methanosalsum zhilinae was isolated from the saline and alkaline sediments of Wadi Natrun in Egypt and from Lake Magadi. It is moderately halophilic.

Methanosalsum natronophilum (natronophilum means soda-loving) was isolated from hypersaline soda lakes.

== See also ==
- List of Archaea genera
