= Methanothrix soehngenii =

Scientific classification
- Domain: Archaea
- Kingdom: Methanobacteriati
- Phylum: Methanobacteriota
- Class: "Methanomicrobia"
- Order: Methanosarcinales
- Family: Methanosaetaceae
- Genus: Methanothrix
- Species: M. soehngenii

Binomial name
- Methanothrix soehngenii Huser et al., 1982

Synonyms
- Methanothrix concilii Patel 1985; Methanosaeta concilii (Patel 1985) Patel & Sprott 1990

Species of archaeon

Methanothrix soehngenii is a species of methanogenic archaea. Its cells are non-motile, non-spore-forming, rod-shaped (0.8×2 μm) and are normally combined end to end in long filaments, surrounded by a sheath-like structure. It is named in honour of N. L. Söhngen.

== Metabolism ==
Unlike other methanogenic archaea, Methanothrix soehngenii cannot reduce carbon dioxide with hydrogen to produce methane. Its sole source of energy is acetate.

== Genome ==
The tRNA^{ala} gene of Methanothrix soehngenii differs from those of other archaea in that it encodes a terminal CCA 3′.
