= Methanococcoides =

Scientific classification
- Domain: Archaea
- Kingdom: Methanobacteriati
- Phylum: Methanobacteriota
- Class: "Methanomicrobia"
- Order: Methanosarcinales
- Family: Methanosarcinaceae
- Genus: Methanococcoides; Sowers and Ferry 1985

Type species
- Methanococcoides methylutens Sowers and Ferry 1985

Species
- M. alaskense; M. burtonii; M. cohabitans; "Ca. M. guerreronegronense"; M. mangrovi; M. methylutens; M. orientis; "M. seepicolus"; M. vulcani

Genus of archaea

Methanococcoides is a genus of archaeans in the family Methanosarcinaceae.

Methanococcoides species are methanogens entirely dependent on methylated compounds for nutrition. The type species of Methanococcoides is Methanococcoides methylutens.

== Phylogeny ==
The currently accepted taxonomy is based on the List of Prokaryotic names with Standing in Nomenclature (LPSN) and National Center for Biotechnology Information (NCBI).

16S rRNA based LTP_07_2026

- Methanococcoides
  - - M. alaskense
    - M. burtonii
  - - M. methylutens
    - M. orientis

53 marker proteins based GTDB 11-RS232

- Methanococcoides
  - - M. burtonii Franzmann et al. 1993
    - - M. alaskense Singh et al. 2005
      - "M. seepicolus" Li et al. 2021
  - - M. cohabitans Li et al. 2025
    - - M. vulcani L'Haridon et al. 2014
      - - M. methylutens Sowers & Ferry 1985
        - M. orientis Liang et al. 2022

== See also ==
- List of Archaea genera
