= Methanoplanus =

Scientific classification
- Domain: Archaea
- Kingdom: Methanobacteriati
- Phylum: Methanobacteriota
- Class: "Methanomicrobia"
- Order: Methanomicrobiales
- Family: Methanomicrobiaceae
- Genus: Methanoplanus; Wildgruber et al. 1984

Type species
- Methanoplanus limicolus corrig. Wildgruber et al. 1984

Species
- M. endosymbiosus; M. limicolus

Genus of archaea

Methanoplanus is a genus of archaeans in the family Methanomicrobiaceae, comprising three species of methanogenic, or methane-producing, archaea. The cells are irregular coccoid in shape, tend to stain Gram-negative and do not form endospores.

== See also ==
- List of Archaea genera
