= Methanosaeta =

Scientific classification
- Domain: Archaea
- Kingdom: Methanobacteriati
- Phylum: Methanobacteriota
- Class: "Methanomicrobia"
- Order: Methanosarcinales
- Family: Methanosaetaceae
- Genus: Methanosaeta; Patel and Sprott 1990

Type species
- Methanosaeta concilii (Patel 1985) Patel & Sprott 1990

Species
- M. concilii; M. harundinacea; "M. pelagica"; M. thermoacetophila

Synonyms
- Methanothrix Huser, Wuhrmann & Zehnder 1983

Genus of archaea

Methanosaeta is a genus of archaeans in the family Methanosaetaceae. Like other species in this family, those of Methanosaeta metabolize acetate as their sole source of energy. The genus contains two species, Methanosaeta concilii, which is the type species (type strain GP6) and Methanosaeta thermophila. For a time, some scientists believed there to be a third species, Methanosaeta soehngenii, but because it has not been described from a pure culture, it is now called Methanothrix soehngenii.

== Phylogeny ==
16S rRNA based LTP_06_2022

- - M. harundinacea Ma, Liu & Dong 2006
  - - M. concilii (Patel 1985) Patel & Sprott 1990 [incl. Methanothrix soehngenii]
    - M. thermoacetophila corrig. (Nozhevnikova & Chudina 1988) Patel & Sprott 1990

53 marker proteins based GTDB 10-RS226

- - "Methanocrinis"
    - "M. harundinaceus" (Ma, Liu & Dong 2006) Khomyakova et al. 2023
    - - "Ca. M. alkalitolerans" Khomyakova et al. 2023
      - "Ca. M. natronophilus" Khomyakova et al. 2023
  - Methanothrix
    - M. soehngenii Huser, Wuhrmann & Zehnder 1983 (incl. Methanosaeta concilii)
    - M. thermoacetophila corrig. Nozhevnikova & Chudina 1988 (incl. M. thermophila)

== Importance ==
Methanosaeta species are some of the most active methanogens in wetlands, producing an extensive amount of methane on Earth. The presence of methane is both good and bad. On one hand, methane is 20 times more effective than carbon dioxide in retaining heat—thus contributing to global warming at an increasing rate. On the other hand, methane can be used as bioenergy in an effort to move from large-scale fossil fuel usage to large-scale bioenergy usage, reducing carbon emissions. Scientists at UMass Amherst discovered that Methanosaeta have the ability to reduce carbon dioxide to methane through electrical connections with other microorganisms.

== See also ==
- List of Archaea genera
