= Methanolacinia =

Scientific classification
- Domain: Archaea
- Kingdom: Methanobacteriati
- Phylum: Methanobacteriota
- Class: "Methanomicrobia"
- Order: Methanomicrobiales
- Family: Methanomicrobiaceae
- Genus: Methanolacinia; Zellner et al. 1990

Type species
- Methanolacinia paynteri (Rivard et al. 1984) Zellner et al. 1990

Species
- M. paynteri; M. petrolearia

Genus of archaea

Methanolacinia is a genus of archaeans in the family Methanomicrobiaceae. The cells are bar-shaped and irregular 0.6 μm in diameter and 1.5–2.5 μm in length. They do not form endospores. Most are non-motile, but some have a single flagellum. They are strictly anaerobic. They produce methane through the reduction of carbon dioxide with hydrogen and cannot use formate, acetate or methyl compounds as substrates.

== See also ==
- List of Archaea genera
