= Methanolobus =

Scientific classification
- Domain: Archaea
- Kingdom: Methanobacteriati
- Phylum: Methanobacteriota
- Class: "Methanomicrobia"
- Order: Methanosarcinales
- Family: Methanosarcinaceae
- Genus: Methanolobus; Konig and Stetter 1983

Type species
- Methanolobus tindarius Konig and Stetter 1983

Species
- See text

Genus of archaea

Methanolobus is a genus of methanogenic archaea within the family Methanosarcinaceae. These organisms are strictly anaerobes and live exclusively through the production of methane, but the species within Methanolobus cannot use carbon dioxide with hydrogen, acetate or formate, only methyl compounds. The cells are irregular coccoid in form and approximately 1 μm in diameter. They do not form endospores. They are Gram negative and only some are motile, via a single flagellum. They are found in lake and ocean sediments that lack oxygen.

== Phylogeny ==
The currently accepted taxonomy is based on the List of Prokaryotic names with Standing in Nomenclature (LPSN) and National Center for Biotechnology Information (NCBI).

16S rRNA based LTP_07_2026

- Methanolobus
  - - M. chelungpuianus Wu & Lai 2015
    - M. halotolerans Shen et al. 2020
  - - M. zinderi Doerfert et al. 2009
    - - - M. oregonensis (Liu et al. 1990) Boone 2002
        - M. taylorii Oremland & Boone 1994
      - - M. mangrovi Zhou et al. 2023
        - - M. psychrotolerans Chen et al. 2018
          - - M. profundi Mochimaru et al. 2009
            - - M. bombayensis Kadam et al. 1994
              - - M. tindarius König & Stetter 1983
                - - M. sediminis Zhou et al. 2023
                  - M. vulcani Stetter et al. 1989

53 marker proteins based GTDB 11-RS232

- Methanolobus
  - - - M. chelungpuianus
      - "M. psychrophilus" Zhang et al. 2008
    - - M. halotolerans
      - M. zinderi
  - - M. psychrotolerans
    - - M. mangrovi
      - - M. profundi
        - - M. bombayensis
          - - M. tindarius
            - - M. sediminis
              - M. vulcani

Unassigned species:

- "Ca. M. methylotrophicus" Ramirez-Arenas, Lopez-Cortes & Martinez-Mercado 2026

== See also ==
- List of Archaea genera
