= Syntrophomonas =

Scientific classification
- Domain: Bacteria
- Kingdom: Bacillati
- Phylum: Bacillota
- Class: Clostridia
- Order: Syntrophomonadales
- Family: Syntrophomonadaceae
- Genus: Syntrophomonas; McInerney et al. 1982

Type species
- Syntrophomonas wolfei McInerney et al. 1982

Species
- S. cellicola; S. curvata; S. erecta; S. palmitatica; S. sapovorans; S. wolfei; S. zehnderi

Synonyms
- Pelospora Matthies et al. 2000; Syntrophospora Zhao et al. 1990

Genus of bacteria

Syntrophomonas is a bacterial genus from the family Syntrophomonadaceae.

== Phylogeny ==
The currently accepted taxonomy is based on the List of Prokaryotic names with Standing in Nomenclature (LPSN) and National Center for Biotechnology Information (NCBI).

16S rRNA based LTP_10_2024

- Syntrophomonas
  - - S. palmitatica Hatamoto et al. 2007
    - - S. curvata Zhang, Liu & Dong 2004
      - S. sapovorans Roy et al. 1987
  - - - S. erecta Zhang, Liu & 2005
      - S. zehnderi Sousa et al. 2007
    - - S. wolfei McInerney et al. 1982
      - - - S. cellicola Wu, Liu & Dong 2006
          - "S. saponavida" (Lorowitz, Zhao & Bryant 1989) Wu, Dong & Liu 2007
        - - "S. bryantii" (Stieb & Schink 1985) Wu, Liu & Dong 2006
            [Syntrophospora bryantii (Stieb & Schink 1985) Zhao et al. 1990]
          - Pelospora glutarica Matthies et al. 2000

120 marker proteins based GTDB 10-RS226

- - Syntrophomonas zehnderi
  - - "Ca. Syntrophocurvum"
    - - Thermosyntropha
      - - Syntrophomonas
          - S. palmitatica
          - - S. wolfei
            - "S. wolfei methylbutyratica"

== See also ==
- List of bacterial orders
- List of bacteria genera
