= Methanomethylovorans =

Scientific classification
- Domain: Archaea
- Kingdom: Methanobacteriati
- Phylum: Methanobacteriota
- Class: "Methanomicrobia"
- Order: Methanosarcinales
- Family: Methanosarcinaceae
- Genus: Methanomethylovorans; Lomans et al. 2004

Type species
- Methanomethylovorans hollandica Lomans et al. 2004

Species
- M. hollandica; M. thermophila; M. uponensis; "M. victoriae"

Genus of archaea

Methanomethylovorans is a genus of microorganisms in the family Methanosarcinaceae. This genus was first described in 1999. The species within it generally live in freshwater environments, including rice paddies, freshwater sediments and contaminated soil. They produce methane from methanol, methylamines, dimethyl sulfide and methanethiol. With the exception of M. thermophila, which has an optimal growth temperature of 50 °C, these species are mesophiles and do not tend to grow at temperatures above 40 °C.

== Phylogeny ==
The currently accepted taxonomy is based on the List of Prokaryotic names with Standing in Nomenclature (LPSN) and National Center for Biotechnology Information (NCBI).

16S rRNA based LTP_07_2026

- Methanomethylovorans
  - M. uponensis Cha et al. 2014
  - - M. hollandica Lomans et al. 2004
    - M. thermophila Jiang et al. 2005

53 marker proteins based GTDB 11-RS232

- Methanomethylovorans
  M. hollandica

== See also ==
- List of Archaea genera
