= Methanospirillaceae =

Scientific classification
- Domain: Archaea
- Kingdom: Methanobacteriati
- Phylum: Methanobacteriota
- Class: "Methanomicrobia"
- Order: Methanomicrobiales
- Family: Methanospirillaceae; Boone et al. 2002

Genera
- "Methanofilum"; Methanolinea; Methanoregula; Methanosphaerula; Methanospirillum

Synonyms
- Methanoregulaceae Sakai et al. 2012; Methanosphaerulaceae Chuvochina et al. 2024

Family of archaea

Methanospirillaceae is a family of microbes within the order Methanomicrobiales.

This family contains only one genus, Methanospirillum. All its species are methanogenic archaea. The cells are bar-shaped and can form long filaments. Most produce energy via the reduction of carbon dioxide with hydrogen, but some species can also use formate as a substrate. They are Gram-negative and move using flagella on the sides of the cells. They are strictly anaerobic, and found in wetland soil and anaerobic stages of water treatment systems.

== Phylogeny ==
The currently accepted taxonomy is based on the List of Prokaryotic names with Standing in Nomenclature (LPSN) and National Center for Biotechnology Information (NCBI).

16S rRNA based LTP_07_2026

- - Methanospirillaceae
    Methanospirillum
  - Methanoregulaceae
    - Methanoregula
    - - Methanosphaerula
      - Methanolinea

53 marker proteins based GTDB 11-RS232

- Methanospirillaceae
  - Methanosphaerula
  - - Methanoregula
    - - Methanolinea
      - - "Methanofilum"
        - Methanospirillum

== See also ==
- List of Archaea genera
