= Syntrophomonas curvata =

Scientific classification
- Domain: Bacteria
- Kingdom: Bacillati
- Phylum: Bacillota
- Class: Clostridia
- Order: Syntrophomonadales
- Family: Syntrophomonadaceae
- Genus: Syntrophomonas
- Species: S. curvata

Binomial name
- Syntrophomonas curvata Zhang et al. 2004

Species of bacterium

Syntrophomonas curvata is a bacterium. It is anaerobic, syntrophic (in association with methanogens) and fatty acid-oxidizing. Its type strain is GB8-1^{T} (=CGMCC 1.5010^{T} =DSM 15682^{T}).
