= Syntrophomonas sapovorans =

Scientific classification
- Domain: Bacteria
- Kingdom: Bacillati
- Phylum: Bacillota
- Class: Clostridia
- Order: Syntrophomonadales
- Family: Syntrophomonadaceae
- Genus: Syntrophomonas
- Species: S. sapovorans

Binomial name
- Syntrophomonas sapovorans Roy et al. 1987

Species of bacterium

Syntrophomonas sapovorans is a bacterium. It is anaerobic, syntrophic, and fatty acid-oxidizing and obligately proton-reducing. Its type strain is OM. It has a doubling time of 40 hours. It is part of the family Syntrophomonadaceae based on comparative small-subunit (SSU) rRNA sequence analysis. This family currently contains three genera, Syntrophomonas, Syntrophospora, and Thermosyntropha, as well as two closely related isolates, strains FSM2 and FSS7.
