= Glucosyl-3-phosphoglycerate phosphatase =

Identifiers
- EC no.: 3.1.3.85

Databases
- BRENDA: enzyme data
- ExPASy: NiceZyme view
- KEGG: enzyme entry
- MetaCyc: metabolic pathway
- Rhea: reactions
- PDB structures: RCSB PDB PDBe PDBsum
Search
- PMC: articles
- PubMed: articles
- NCBI: proteins

Glucosyl-3-phosphoglycerate phosphatase (EC 3.1.3.85, GpgP protein) is an enzyme with systematic name α-D-glucosyl-3-phospho-D-glycerate phosphohydrolase. It catalyses a chemical reaction which removes a phosphate group (P_{i}) by hydrolysis:

2-O-(α-D-glucopyranosyl)-3-O-phospho-D-glyceric acid
H_{2}O
P_{i}
2-O-(α-D-glucopyranosyl)-D-glyceric acid

This is the second step in the biosynthesis of 2-O-(α-D-glucopyranosyl)-D-glyceric acid, and the enzyme has been characterised from Methanococcoides burtonii and Persephonella marina. The first step catalysed by glucosyl-3-phosphoglycerate synthase produces the phosphoglycerate derivative by adding a glucose unit from UDP-glucose. This pair of enzymes are also present in Mycobacterium tuberculosis and the product is incorporated into methylglucose lipopolysaccharides.
