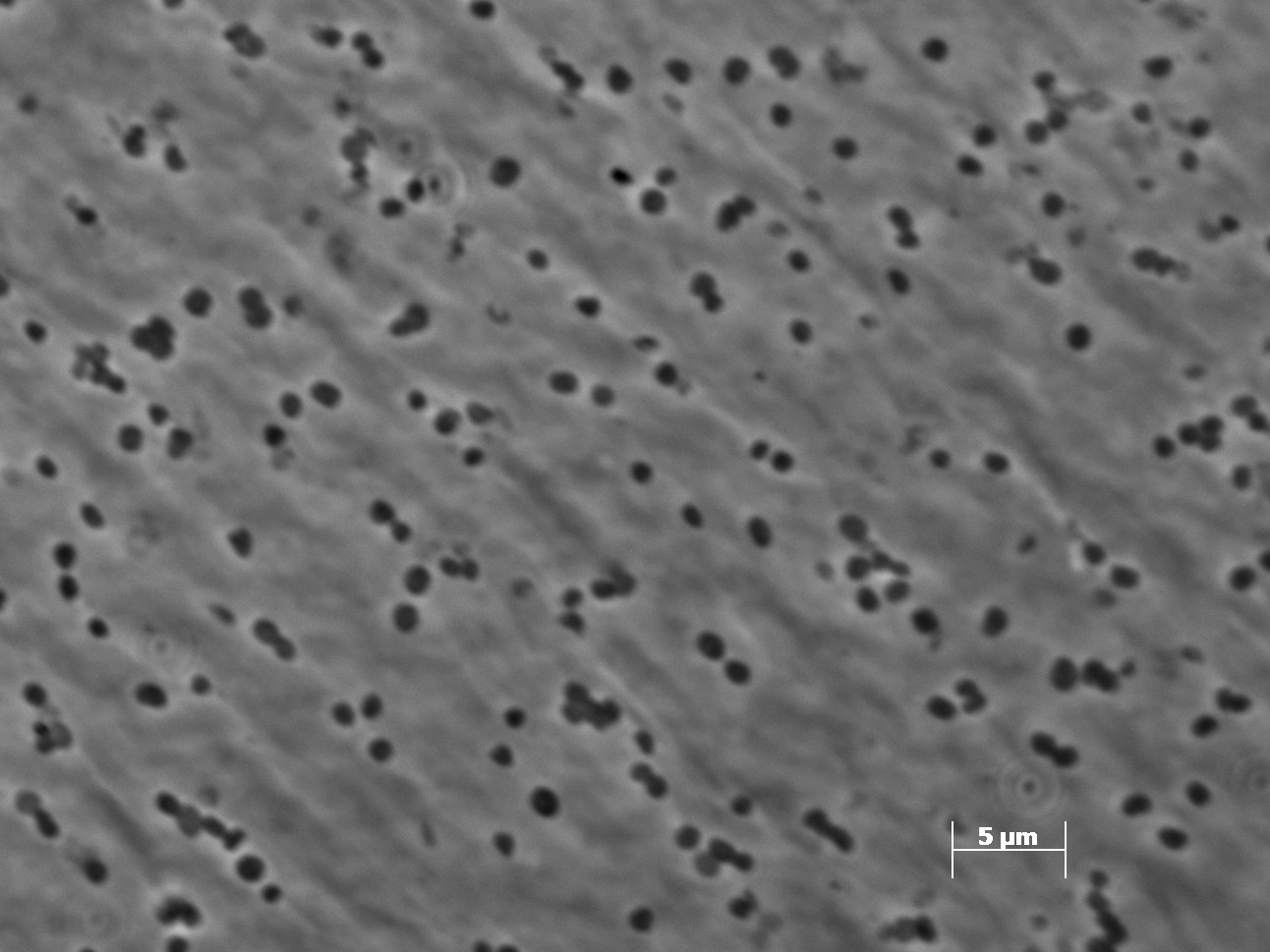
- Phase-contrast photo of Methanimicrococcus blatticola, type strain PA^{T}

Scientific classification
- Domain: Archaea
- Kingdom: Methanobacteriati
- Phylum: Methanobacteriota
- Class: "Methanomicrobia"
- Order: Methanosarcinales
- Family: Methanosarcinaceae
- Genus: Methanimicrococcus corrig. Sprenger et al. 2000

Type species
- Methanimicrococcus blatticola corrig. Sprenger et al. 2000

Species
- M. blatticola; M. hacksteinii; M. hongohii; M. stummii; "Ca. M. labiotermitis"; "Ca. M. odontotermitis"

= Methanimicrococcus =

Genus of archaea

The genus Methanimicrococcus was described based on the strain PA (ATCC BAA-276; DSM 13328), isolated from the hindgut of a cockroach, Periplaneta americana. The species was initially named Methanomicrococcus blatticola; however, the name was later corrected to Methanimicrococcus blatticola, making it the only genus of methanogens that has -i as a connecting vowel rather than -o in the name.

The cells are irregular cocci with a diameter of 0.7 – 1 μm, occurring singly or in clusters. M. blatticola can only use methylated compounds, such as methanol or methylamines, in combination with H_{2} to produce methane, which is in sharp contrast to other methanogens from the Methanosarcinales order. Later studies showed a lack of activity for enzymes involved in the Wood-Ljungdahl pathway that reduce CO_{2} to the methyl group. Genome analysis demonstrated that the highly reduced genome of M. blatticola lacks the upper part of the Wood-Ljungdahl pathway, restricting this methanogen to methylated compounds and H_{2}.

Methanimicrococcus could be very abundant among cockroaches, representing up to 97% of the archaeal community in some species. It is also present in some species of termites and scarab beetle larvae. One of the reasons for such success is the very low H_{2} and methanol threshold attributed to H_{2}-dependent methyl-reducing methanogenesis. Additionally, it is suggested that Methanimicrococcus can withstand O_{2} fluxes in the microoxic environment of the arthropod gut wall, a feature that is rarely observed among methanogens. However, the molecular mechanism of such resistance is still not deciphered.

Recently, more species from the Methanimicrococcus genus were described. Three were described based on cultures and were also isolated from cockroaches - M. hacksteinii, M. hongohii, and M. stummii. Two other species were described solely based on genomes obtained from termite gut metagenomes - Candidatus M. labiotermitis and Ca. M. odontotermitis.

== Phylogeny ==
The currently accepted taxonomy is based on the List of Prokaryotic names with Standing in Nomenclature (LPSN) and National Center for Biotechnology Information (NCBI).

16S rRNA based LTP_07_2026

- Methanimicrococcus
  - M. hongohii
  - - M. stummii
    - - M. blatticola
      - M. hacksteinii

53 marker proteins based GTDB 11-RS232

- Methanimicrococcus
  - "Ca. M. labiotermitis" Protasov & Brune 2023
  - - - M. blatticola corrig. Sprenger et al. 2000
      - "Ca. M. odontotermitis" Protasov & Brune 2023
    - - M. hongohii Protasov & Brune 2025
      - - M. hacksteinii Protasov & Brune 2025
        - M. stummii Protasov & Brune 2025

== See also ==
- List of Archaea genera
