= Methanococcoides burtonii =

Scientific classification
- Domain: Archaea
- Kingdom: Methanobacteriati
- Phylum: Methanobacteriota
- Class: "Methanomicrobia"
- Order: Methanosarcinales
- Family: Methanosarcinaceae
- Genus: Methanococcoides
- Species: M. burtonii

Binomial name
- Methanococcoides burtonii Franzmann et al. 1993

Species of archaeon

Methanococcoides burtonii is a methylotrophic methanogenic archaeon first isolated from Ace Lake, Antarctica. Its type strain is DSM 6242.

M. burtonii is an extremophilic archeon of the family Methanosarcinaceae, a family of three genera of coccus-shaped cells. Methanococcides burtonii has adapted to life in Antarctica where it resides in Ace Lake at temperatures that remain permanently 1-2 °C. M. burtonii was first discovered by an Austrian limnologist named Harry Burton. It was determined that the optimal temperature of growth was 23 °C. M. burtonii is able to grow on methylated substrates and tolerates a broad range of growth temperatures (< 4° to 29 °C). The cold adaptation in M. burtonii involves specific changes in membrane lipid unsaturation and flexible proteins. M. burtonii are irregular cocci, ranging 0. to 1.8 micrometers in diameter. M. burtonii occur singly or in pairs. During Gram staining, cells lysej; they also lyse in hypotonic solutions. M. burtonii are motile with a single flagellum, and lack storage structures and internal membranes in the cytoplasm. M. burtonii are colony-forming archaea, usually occurring in <1 millimeter colonies that are circular and convex. Cells of M. burtonii fluoresce blue when exposed to UV illumination. The optimal initial pH for growth is 7.7. Two substances found to stimulate growth are yeast extract and trypticase soy agar. M. burtonii cells were found to be resistant to penicillin, ampicillin, tetracycline, vancomycin and erythromycin. Although it has evolved the ability to sustain itself in what are considered "extremophilic" environments for archaea (1-2 °C), M. burtonii optimally grows at 23 °C. M. burtonii is an obligately methylotrophic methanogen able to use methylamines and methanol, but not formate, H_{2}CO_{2}, or acetate for growth. Methane is a greenhouse gas, and methanogens play a critical role in global warming and the global carbon cycle via the production of methane.

== Cold Adaptation ==
M. burtonii are thermally regulated, thus highlighting the role that energy generation and biosynthesis pathways play in cold adaptation. proteomic research shows that cellular levels of subunit E are higher during growth at low temperatures. This could possibly indicate that Subunit E is fulfilling a specific role in regulating the transcription of genes involved in low temperature growth or in facilitating transcription at low temperature in general. M. burtonii have regulatory mechanisms resembling those found in cold shock induced RNA helicase genes from E. coli. Thus, these mechanisms have similarity with bacterial methods of cold adaptation. M. burtonii have decreased levels of DnaK and increased levels of PPIase at 4 degrees Celsius possibly indicating the protein folding is a thermally sensitive process and may contribute to its adaptation to the cold. A number of genes involved in methanogenesis are thermally regulated, and regulation involves the expression of genes in operons, protein modification, and the synthesis of Pyrrolysine containing TMA-MT. At 4 °C higher levels of protein and/or mRNA are expressed for genes involved in methanogenesis which produces a proton motive force that drives cellular processes including ATP synthesis, and pathways from acetyl-CoA leading to amino acid metabolism. M. burtonii have increased levels of GDH and GAPDH (key enzymes in nitrogen and carbon metabolism) at 4 °C indicating that there is an effective regulation of fundamental processes of carbon and nitrogen metabolism consistent with the evolution of the organism for growth in the cold.

=== Membrane Structure and Flexible Proteins ===
It is known that Archaea represent a large proportion of the microbial biomass in “cold” environments, i.e., Ace Lake where M. burtonii was discovered. As environmental temperature decreases, the lipid bilayer becomes rigid in a majority of wild type organisms. However, it has been discovered that increasing the proportion of unsaturated fatty acids in the membrane can sustain a liquid crystalline state. To accomplish this a desaturase enzyme is utilized. De novo synthesis allows for a permanent adaptation to cold environments, as is observed in M. burtonii. It was determined that the presence of unsaturated diether lipids (UDLs) provides a mechanism of cold adaptation in archaea. Certain UDLs have been discovered in M. burtonii. These UDLs are temperature sensitive, and growing them at different temperature affects the rate of unsaturation in the membrane. Thus, this provides evidence that M. burtonii has the ability to control its membrane fluidity (with respect to temperature). This ability therefore provides a plausible pathway to cold adaptation by archaea. Other molecules potentially responsible for membrane unsaturation, and thus cold adaptation, are isoprenoid side chains. Two specific enzymes, acetoacetyl-CoA thiolase and HMG-CoA synthase were discovered to participate in the melavonate pathway in M. burtonii. Isoprenoid chains produced in this manner are fully unsaturated. A higher content of noncharged polar amino acids, particularly Gln and Thr and a lower content of hydrophobic amino acids, particularly Leu have been found in M.burtonii. GC-content is the major factor influencing tRNA stability in this organism. A proteomics approach using two-dimensional chromatography-mass spectrometry found major phospholipids were archaeol phosphatidylglycerol, archaeol phosphatidylinositol, hydroxyarchaeol phosphatidylglycerol, and hydroxyarchaeol phosphatidylinositol. All phospholipid classes contained a series of unsaturated analogues, with the degree of unsaturation dependent on phospholipid class. The proportion of unsaturated lipids from cells grown at 4 °C was significantly higher than for cells grown at 23 °C. 3-Hydroxy-3-methylglutaryl coenzyme A synthase, farnesyl diphosphate synthase, and geranylgeranyl diphosphate synthase were identified in the expressed proteome, and most genes involved in the mevalonate pathway and processes leading to the formation of phosphatidylinositol and phosphatidylglycerol were identified in the genome sequence.

M. burtonii ICAT Proteome: Protein extracts from M. burtonii cultures grown at 4 °C and 23 °C were labeled with the ICAT reagent and digested with trypsin. ICAT-labeled peptides were isolated using affinity chromatography. 163 proteins were identified.

== Genome Structure and Evolution ==
Genome sequencing for M. burtonii revealed a single circular chromosome encompassing 2,575,832 base pairs. The M. burtonii genome is characterized by a higher level of aberrant sequences in composition than any other archeon. M. burtonii has the ability to accommodate highly skewed amino acid content while retaining codon usage. This has been a major evolutionary step in cold adaptation. In a study using COG_scrambler, a number of significant gene sets in the M. burtonii were overrepresented. Significantly, overrepresented COG's consisted of signal transduction histidine kinases, REC-A superfamily ATPases and Che-Y like response regulators, along with numerous transposases. Moreover, in comparison to archaeal genome sets M. burtonii's genome has overrepresented sets of genes in defense and motility mechanisms, while underrepresented in categories of nucleotide translation and nucleotide metabolism.

=== ABC Transporters ===
M. burtonii has a distinct lack of identifiable ABC transporters for peptides. This lack of identifiable ABC-transporter permease for peptides constitutes a major difference between M. burtonii and other members of its family: Methanosarcineae. Therefore, this lack of peptide transport accompanies their inability to utilize peptides for growth.

=== Metabolism ===
M. burtonii has the capacity for glycolysis and gluconeogenesis. It produces acetyl-CoA from methyl-tetrahydrosarcinapterin and carbon dioxide. The enzyme used in this pathway is carbon monoxide dehydrogenase/acetyl-CoA synthase.

M. burtonii possesses a type-III ribulose,1-5-bisphosphate carboxylase/oxygenase, however no identifiable gene for phosphoribulokinase has been found. Therefore, M. burtonii cannot accomplish carbon fixation by RubisCO. Also, M. burtonii has ADP-dependent sugar kinases used in glycolysis. When energy levels are low and/or the environment is anaerobic, M. burtonii utilizes ATP via this pathway given the ability of ATP synthesis through 3-PGA.

=== Amino Acid synthesis ===
M. burtonii produces cysteine via the tRNA-dependent pathway and the O-acetylserine pathway. Pyrrolysine is produced using the enzyme pyrrolysyl-tRNA synthetase.

=== Methanogenesis ===
M. burtonii obtains its energy from the oxidation of methyl groups to carbon dioxide and reduction to methane; hence it is called an "obligatory methylotrophic methanogen". For methanogens, growth in the presence of hydrogen require three separate hydrogenases: ECh, Frh/Fre, and Vho; M. burtonii does not contain any of these. M. burtonii does not use formate, H_{2}:CO_{2} or acetate for growth.

=== Signal Transduction ===
The genome of M. burtonii also includes a chemotaxis mechanism consisting of a chemotaxis protein, a chemotaxis histidine kinase CheA, and a chemotaxis response regulator. M. burtonii participates in environmental sensing via a variety of protein kinases. M. burtonii is a strict anaerobe that possesses intracellular kinases that are used in recognition of oxygen. These kinases also recognize other elements crucial to its survival.
