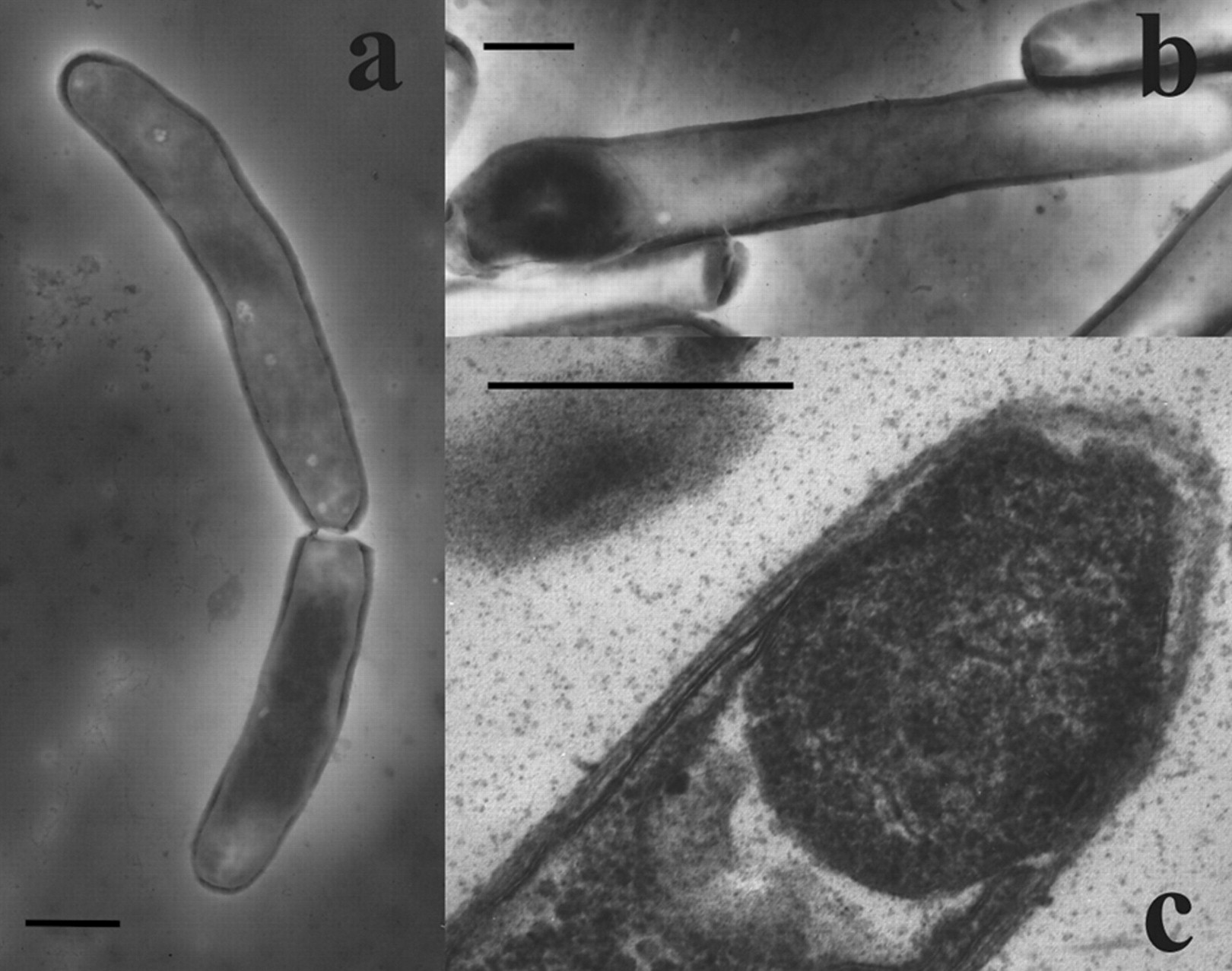
- Carboxydocella sporoproducens

Scientific classification
- Domain: Bacteria
- Kingdom: Bacillati
- Phylum: Bacillota
- Class: Clostridia
- Order: Carboxydocellales
- Family: Carboxydocellaceae
- Genus: Carboxydocella; Sokolova et al. 2002

Type species
- Carboxydocella thermautotrophica Sokolova et al. 2002

Species
- "C. ferrireducens"; C. manganica; C. sporoproducens; C. thermautotrophica

= Carboxydocella =

Genus of bacteria

Carboxydocella is a Gram-positive and obligate anaerobe bacterial genus from the family Syntrophomonadaceae.

== Phylogeny ==
The currently accepted taxonomy is based on the List of Prokaryotic names with Standing in Nomenclature (LPSN) and National Center for Biotechnology Information (NCBI).

16S rRNA based LTP_10_2024

- Carboxydocella
  - C. manganica Slobodkina et al. 2012
  - - C. sporoproducens Slepova et al. 2006
    - C. thermautotrophica Sokolova et al. 2002

120 marker proteins based GTDB 10-RS226

- Carboxydocella
  - C. thermautotrophica (incl. C. sporoproducens)
