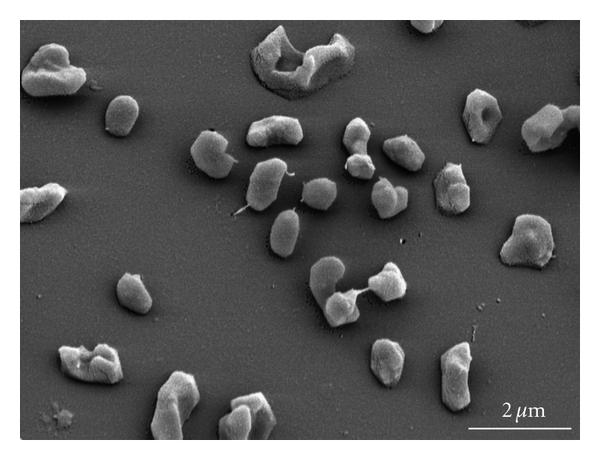
- Methanohalophilus mahii

Scientific classification
- Domain: Archaea
- Kingdom: Methanobacteriati
- Phylum: Methanobacteriota
- Class: "Methanomicrobia"
- Order: Methanosarcinales
- Family: Methanosarcinaceae
- Genus: Methanohalophilus; Paterek and Smith 1988

Type species
- Methanohalophilus mahii Paterek & Smith 1988

Species
- "M. euhalobius"; M. halophilus; "Ca. M. hillemani"; M. levihalophilus; M. mahii; "Ca. M. methylutens"; M. oregonense; M. portucalensis; M. profundi

= Methanohalophilus =

Genus of archaea

Methanohalophilus is a genus of archaeans in the family Methanosarcinaceae.

The species are strictly anaerobic and live solely through the production of methane, using methyl compounds as substrates. The genus Methanohalophilus contains four moderately halophilic species, Methanohalophilus mahii and Methanohalophilus hillemani cultured from Utah's Great Salt Lake in the United States, Methanohalophilus halophilus isolated from Shark Bay in Australia, and Methanohalophilus portucalensis isolated from a salt pan in Portugal. It also contains Methanohalophilus oregonese, which is alkaliphilic.

== Phylogeny ==
The currently accepted taxonomy is based on the List of Prokaryotic names with Standing in Nomenclature (LPSN) and National Center for Biotechnology Information (NCBI).

16S rRNA based LTP_07_2026

- Methanohalophilus
  - M. levihalophilus
  - - M. portucalensis
    - - M. halophilus
      - M. mahii

53 marker proteins based GTDB 11-RS232

- Methanohalophilus
  - M. levihalophilus Katayama et al. 2014
  - - "M. euhalobius" (Obraztsova et al. 1987) Davidova et al. 1997
    - - M. mahii Paterek & Smith 1988
      - - M. profundi L'Haridon et al. 2021
        - - M. halophilus (Zhilina 1984) Wilharm et al. 1991
          - M. portucalensis Boone et al. 1993

== See also ==
- Methanogen
- List of Archaea genera
