= Syntrophomonas zehnderi =

Scientific classification
- Domain: Bacteria
- Kingdom: Bacillati
- Phylum: Bacillota
- Class: Clostridia
- Order: Syntrophomonadales
- Family: Syntrophomonadaceae
- Genus: Syntrophomonas
- Species: S. zehnderi

Binomial name
- Syntrophomonas zehnderi Sousa et al. 2007

Species of bacterium

Syntrophomonas zehnderi is a bacterium. It is anaerobic, syntrophic (in association with methanogens, particularly Methanobacterium formicicum) and fatty‑acid‑oxidizing. The type strain is OL‑4^{T} (=DSM 17840^{T} =JCM 13948^{T}). Cells are slightly curved, non‑motile rods.

S. zehnderi thrives near 37 degrees C and relies on hydrogen-foraging methanogens to break down C4--C18 fatty acids into acetate, propionate, and methane.

== Biotechnological application ==
Seeding oleate-fed digesters with S. zehnderi shortens its ignition times and boosts methane production, which is regarded as a sustainable and therefore valuable biofuel.
