= Glucosyl-3-phosphoglycerate synthase =

Class of enzymes

Identifiers
- EC no.: 2.4.1.266

Databases
- IntEnz: IntEnz view
- BRENDA: BRENDA entry
- ExPASy: NiceZyme view
- KEGG: KEGG entry
- MetaCyc: metabolic pathway
- PRIAM: profile
- PDB structures: RCSB PDB PDBe PDBsum
Search
- PMC: articles
- PubMed: articles
- NCBI: proteins

Glucosyl-3-phosphoglycerate synthase (EC 2.4.1.266, GpgS protein, GPG synthase, glucosylphosphoglycerate synthase) is an enzyme with systematic name NDP-glucose:3-phospho-D-glycerate 2-alpha-D-glucosyltransferase. It catalyses the following chemical reaction

3-phospho-D-glyceric acid
+ UDP-glucose
UDP
2-O-(α-D-glucopyranosyl)-3-O-phospho-D-glyceric acid

This transfers a glucose unit to 3-phospho-D-glyceric acid to give its glucosyl derivative. The enzyme characterised from Persephonella marina can use GDP-glucose or ADP-glucose in the reaction. However, the enzyme in Methanococcoides burtonii can only use GDP-glucose. The enzyme is also present in Mycobacterium tuberculosis. In these organisms, a second reaction catalysed by glucosyl-3-phosphoglycerate phosphatase forms 2-O-(α-D-glucopyranosyl)-D-glyceric acid by removal of the phosphate group.
