= Methanocella paludicola =

Scientific classification
- Domain: Archaea
- Kingdom: Methanobacteriati
- Phylum: Methanobacteriota
- Class: "Methanomicrobia"
- Order: Methanocellales
- Family: Methanocellaceae
- Genus: Methanocella
- Species: M. paludicola

Binomial name
- Methanocella paludicola Sakai et al. 2008

Species of archaeon

Methanocella paludicola is a methane-producing archaeon, the type species of its genus. It was first isolated from rice paddy soil, and is mesophilic and hydrogenotrophic, with type strain SANAE^{T} (=JCM 13418^{T} =NBRC 101707^{T} =DSM 17711^{T}).
