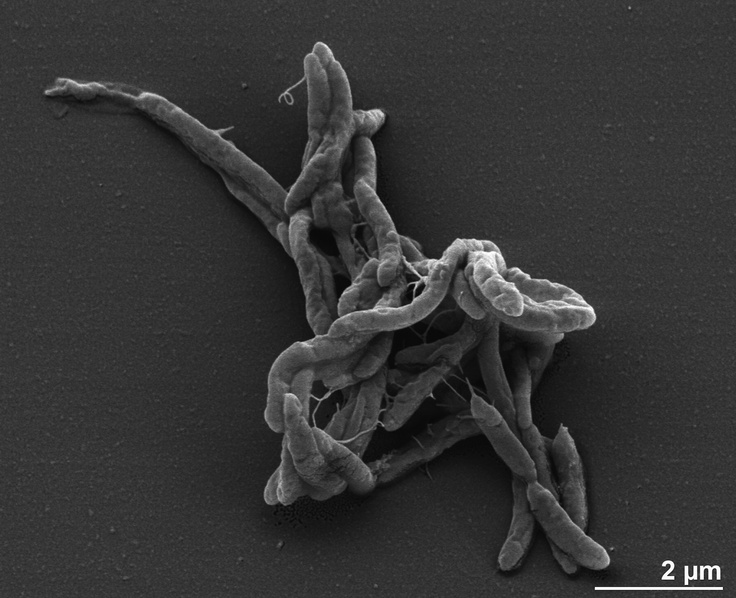

Scientific classification
- Domain: Bacteria
- Kingdom: Bacillati
- Phylum: Bacillota
- Class: Clostridia
- Order: Syntrophomonadales
- Family: Syntrophomonadaceae
- Genus: Syntrophothermus
- Species: S. lipocalidus

Binomial name
- Syntrophothermus lipocalidus Sekiguchi et al. 2000

= Syntrophothermus lipocalidus =

Species of bacterium

"Syntrophothermus lipocalidus" is a bacterium, the type species and only currently described species in its genus. It is thermophilic, syntrophic, fatty-acid-oxidizing and anaerobic, and utilises isobutyrate. TGB-C1^{T} is its type strain. Its genome has been fully sequenced.
