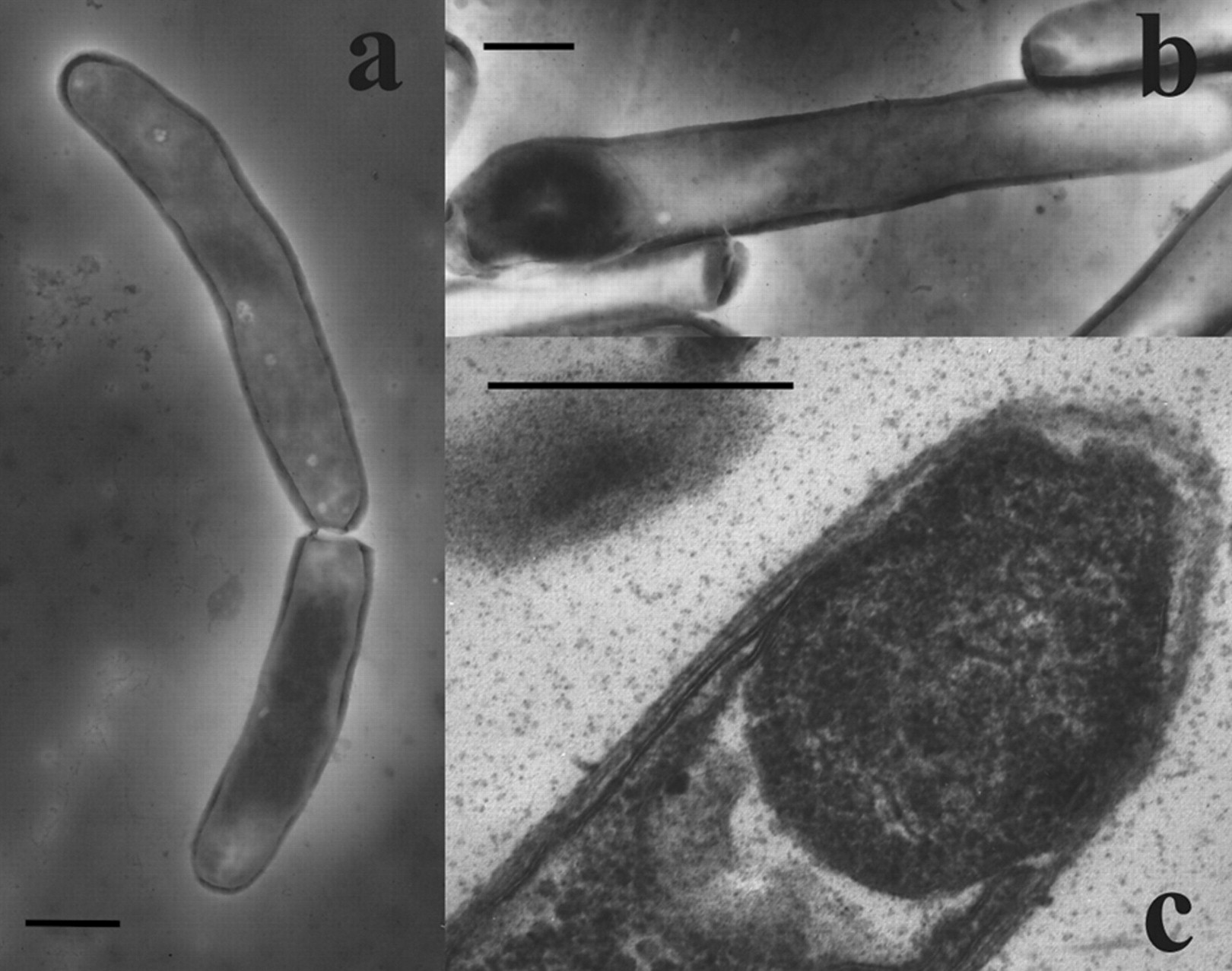

Scientific classification
- Domain: Bacteria
- Kingdom: Bacillati
- Phylum: Bacillota
- Class: Clostridia
- Order: Carboxydocellales
- Family: Carboxydocellaceae
- Genus: Carboxydocella
- Species: C. sporoproducens

Binomial name
- Carboxydocella sporoproducens Slepova et al. 2006

= Carboxydocella sporoproducens =

Species of bacterium

Carboxydocella sporoproducens is a species of bacteria belonging to the family of Syntrophomonadaceae.
