= Hydrogen cycle =

Hydrogen exchange between the living and non-living world

The hydrogen cycle consists of hydrogen exchanges between biotic (living) and abiotic (non-living) sources and sinks of hydrogen-containing compounds.

Hydrogen (H) is the most abundant element in the universe. On Earth, common H-containing inorganic molecules include water (H_{2}O), hydrogen gas (H_{2}), hydrogen sulfide (H_{2}S), and ammonia (NH_{3}). Many organic compounds also contain H atoms, such as hydrocarbons and organic matter. Given the ubiquity of hydrogen atoms in inorganic and organic chemical compounds, the hydrogen cycle is focused on molecular hydrogen, H_{2}.

As a consequence of microbial metabolisms or naturally occurring rock-water interactions, hydrogen gas can be created. Other bacteria may then consume free H2, which may also be oxidised photochemically in the atmosphere or lost to space. Hydrogen is also thought to be an important reactant in pre-biotic chemistry and the early evolution of life on Earth, and potentially elsewhere in the Solar System.

== Abiotic cycles ==
=== Sources ===
Abiotic sources of hydrogen gas include water-rock and photochemical reactions. Exothermic serpentinization reactions between water and olivine minerals liberate H_{2} in the marine or terrestrial subsurface. In the ocean, hydrothermal vents erupt magma and altered seawater fluids including abundant H_{2}, depending on the temperature regime and host rock composition. Molecular hydrogen can also be produced through photooxidation (via solar UV radiation) of some mineral species such as siderite in anoxic aqueous environments. This may have been an important process in the upper regions of early Earth's Archaean oceans.

=== Sinks ===
Because H_{2} is the lightest element, atmospheric H_{2} can readily be lost to space via Jeans escape, an irreversible process that drives Earth's net mass loss. Photolysis of heavier compounds not prone to escape, such as CH_{4} or H_{2}O, can also liberate H_{2} from the upper atmosphere and contribute to this process. Another major sink of free atmospheric H_{2} is photochemical oxidation by hydroxyl radicals (•OH), which forms water.

Anthropogenic sinks of H_{2} include synthetic fuel production through the Fischer-Tropsch reaction and artificial nitrogen fixation through the Haber-Bosch process to produce nitrogen fertilizers.

== Biotic cycles ==
Many microbial metabolisms produce or consume H_{2}.

=== Production ===
Hydrogen is produced by hydrogenases and nitrogenases enzymes in many microorganisms, some of which are being studied for their potential for biofuel production. These H_{2}-metabolizing enzymes are found in all three domains of life, and out of known genomes over 30% of microbial taxa contain hydrogenase genes. Fermentation produces H_{2} from organic matter as part of the anaerobic microbial food chain via light-dependent or light-independent pathways.

=== Consumption ===
Biological soil uptake is the dominant sink of atmospheric H_{2}. Both aerobic and anaerobic microbial metabolisms consume H_{2} by oxidizing it in order to reduce other compounds during respiration. Aerobic H_{2} oxidation is known as the Knallgas reaction.

Anaerobic H_{2} oxidation often occurs during interspecies hydrogen transfer in which H_{2} produced during fermentation is transferred to another organism, which uses the H_{2} to reduce CO_{2} to CH_{4} or acetate, SO^{2−}_{4} to H_{2}S, or Fe^{3+} to Fe^{2+}. Interspecies hydrogen transfer keeps H_{2} concentrations very low in most environments because fermentation becomes less thermodynamically favorable as the partial pressure of H_{2} increases.

== Relevance for the global climate ==
Hydrogen typically acts as an electron donor. This quality has implications for global atmospheric chemistry, possibly delaying the degradation and increasing the abundance of greenhouse gases. This makes hydrogen an indirect greenhouse gas. For example, H_{2} can interfere with the removal of methane from the atmosphere. Typically, atmospheric CH_{4} is oxidized by hydroxyl radicals (^{•}OH), but H_{2} can also react with ^{•}OH to reduce it to H_{2}O.

CH_{4} + ^{•}OH → ^{•}CH_{3} + H_{2}O
H_{2} + ^{•}OH → H^{•} + H_{2}O

== Implications for astrobiology ==
Hydrothermal H_{2} may have played a major role in pre-biotic chemistry. Liberation of H_{2} by serpentinization may have supported formation of the reactants proposed in the iron-sulfur world origin of life hypothesis. The subsequent evolution of hydrogenotrophic methanogenesis is hypothesized as one of the earliest metabolisms on Earth.

Serpentinization can occur on any planetary body with chondritic composition. The discovery of H_{2} on other ocean worlds, such as Enceladus, suggests that similar processes are ongoing elsewhere in the Solar System, and potentially in other planetary systems as well.

== See also ==
- Biogeochemical cycle
- Carbon cycle
- Hydrogen
- Methane
- Serpentinization
- Interspecies hydrogen transfer
- Fermentation
- Hydrothermal vents
- Water cycle
- Ocean World Exploration Program
