= M. taiwanensis =

M. taiwanensis may refer to:

- Maackia taiwanensis, a legume species found only in Taiwan
- Macrothele taiwanensis, a mygalomorph spider species in the genus Macrothele
- Methanocalculus taiwanensis, an Archaea species in the genus Methanocalculus
- Myotis taiwanensis, a bat species
