= Glycine/sarcosine/dimethylglycine N-methyltransferase =

Identifiers
- EC no.: 2.1.1.162

Databases
- IntEnz: IntEnz view
- BRENDA: BRENDA entry
- ExPASy: NiceZyme view
- KEGG: KEGG entry
- MetaCyc: metabolic pathway
- PRIAM: profile
- PDB structures: RCSB PDB PDBe PDBsum
Search
- PMC: articles
- PubMed: articles
- NCBI: proteins

Glycine/sarcosine/dimethylglycine N-methyltransferase (EC 2.1.1.162, GSDMT, glycine sarcosine dimethylglycine N-methyltransferase) is an enzyme with systematic name S-adenosyl-L-methionine:glycine(or sarcosine or N,N-dimethylglycine) N-methyltransferase (sarcosine(or N,N-dimethylglycine or betaine)-forming). This enzyme catalyses the following overall chemical reaction

glycine
+ 3 SAM
trimethylglycine
+ 3 SAH

The enzyme adds three methyl groups to glycine, giving the betaine, trimethylglycine. It also converts the intermediates, sarcosine and dimethylglycine to the product. The methyl groups come from the cofactor, S-adenosyl methionine (SAM), which becomes S-adenosyl-L-homocysteine (SAH). The enzyme was characterised from the halophilic methanoarchaeon, Methanohalophilus portucalensis.
