= Syntrophospora =

Scientific classification
- Domain: Bacteria
- Kingdom: Bacillati
- Phylum: Bacillota
- Class: Clostridia
- Order: Syntrophomonadales
- Family: Syntrophomonadaceae
- Genus: Syntrophospora; Zhao et al. 1990
- Species: S. bryantii

Binomial name
- Syntrophospora bryantii (Stieb and Schink 1985) Zhao et al. 1990

Synonyms
- Clostridium bryantii; "Syntrophomonas bryantii"

Species of bacterium

Syntrophospora bryantii is a species of bacteria belonging to the family Syntrophomonadaceae. It is the only described species in the genus Syntrophospora and has been proposed to be a part of the genus Syntrophomonas instead.
