= Methanospirillum =

Scientific classification
- Domain: Archaea
- Kingdom: Methanobacteriati
- Phylum: Methanobacteriota
- Class: "Methanomicrobia"
- Order: Methanomicrobiales
- Family: Methanospirillaceae
- Genus: Methanospirillum; Ferry, Smith & Wolfe 1974

Type species
- Methanospirillum hungatei corrig. Ferry, Smith & Wolfe 1974

Species
- M. hungatei; M. lacunae; M. psychrodurum; M. purgamenti; M. stamsii

Genus of archaea

Methanospirillum is a genus of microbes within the family Methanospirillaceae. All its species are methanogenic archaea. The cells are bar-shaped and form filaments. Most produce energy via the reduction of carbon dioxide with hydrogen, but some species can also use formate as a substrate. They are Gram-negative and move using archaella on the sides of the cells. They are strictly anaerobic, and they are found in wetland soil and anaerobic water treatment systems.

== Phylogeny ==
The currently accepted taxonomy is based on the List of Prokaryotic names with Standing in Nomenclature (LPSN) and National Center for Biotechnology Information (NCBI).

16S rRNA based LTP_07_2026

- Methanospirillum
  - - M. lacunae Iino, Mori & Suzuki 2010
    - M. psychrodurum Zhou, Liu & Dong 2014
  - - M. hungatei corrig. Ferry, Smith & Wolfe 1974
    - - M. purgamenti Pradel et al. 2025
      - M. stamsii Parshina et al. 2014

53 marker proteins based GTDB 11-RS232

- Methanospirillum
  - M. lacunae
  - - M. stamsii
    - - M. hungatei
      - M. purgamenti

== See also ==
- List of Archaea genera
