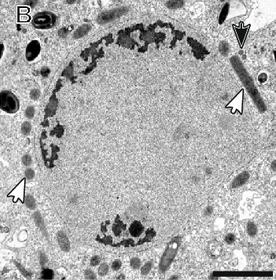

Scientific classification
- Domain: Archaea
- Kingdom: Methanobacteriati
- Phylum: Methanobacteriota
- Class: "Methanomicrobia"
- Order: Methanomicrobiales
- Family: Methanoregulaceae
- Genus: Methanoregula; Brauer et al. 2011

Type species
- Methanoregula boonei Brauer et al. 2011

Species
- M. boonei; M. formicica; "M. pelomyxae"

Synonyms
- "Ca. Methanoregula" Brauer et al. 2006

= Methanoregula =

Genus of archaea

Methanoregula is a genus of archaeans in the order Methanomicrobiales. It was isolated from an acidic peat bog. It produces methane at the lowest pH of any known organism.

== Phylogeny ==
The currently accepted taxonomy is based on the List of Prokaryotic names with Standing in Nomenclature (LPSN) and National Center for Biotechnology Information (NCBI).

16S rRNA based LTP_07_2026

- Methanoregula
  - M. boonei Bräuer et al. 2011
  - M. formicica Yashiro et al. 2011

53 marker proteins based GTDB 11-RS232

- Methanoregula
  - M. boonei Bräuer et al. 2011
  - M. formicica Yashiro et al. 2011

== See also ==
- List of Archaea genera
