= Methanocalculus =

Scientific classification
- Domain: Archaea
- Kingdom: Methanobacteriati
- Phylum: Methanobacteriota
- Class: "Methanomicrobia"
- Order: Methanomicrobiales
- Family: Methanocorpusculaceae
- Genus: Methanocalculus; Ollivier et al. 1998

Type species
- Methanocalculus halotolerans Ollivier et al. 1998

Species
- M. alkaliphilus; M. chunghsingensis; M. halotolerans; M. natronophilus; M. pumilus; M. taiwanensis

Genus of archaea

Methanocalculus is a genus of archaeans in the order Methanomicrobiales, and is known to include methanogens.

The genome of Methanocalculus is somewhat different from other genera of methanogenic archaea, with less than 90% 16S ribosomal RNA similarity. The species within Methanocalculus also have a greater tolerance to salt than other microorganisms, and they can live at salt concentrations as high as 125 g/L. Some species within Methanocalculus are neutrophiles, and Methanocalculus natronophilus, discovered in 2013, is a strict alkaliphile.

== Nomenclature ==
The name "Methanocalculus" has Latin roots: "methano" for methane and "calculus" for gravel. Overall, it means gravel-shaped organism that produces methane.

== Phylogeny ==
The currently accepted taxonomy is based on the List of Prokaryotic names with Standing in Nomenclature (LPSN) and National Center for Biotechnology Information (NCBI).

16S rRNA based LTP_07_2026

- Methanocalculus
  - M. natronophilus Zhilina et al. 2014
  - - - M. alkaliphilus Sorokin et al. 2015
      - M. chunghsingensis Lai et al. 2004
    - - M. taiwanensis Lai et al. 2002
      - - M. halotolerans Ollivier et al. 1998
        - M. pumilus Mori et al. 2000

53 marker proteins based GTDB 11-RS232

- Methanocalculus
  - - M. alkaliphilus
    - M. chunghsingensis
  - - M. natronophilus
    - M. taiwanensis

== See also ==
- List of Archaea genera
