= Syntrophomonas wolfei =

Scientific classification
- Domain: Bacteria
- Kingdom: Bacillati
- Phylum: Bacillota
- Class: Clostridia
- Order: Syntrophomonadales
- Family: Syntrophomonadaceae
- Genus: Syntrophomonas
- Species: S. wolfei

Binomial name
- Syntrophomonas wolfei McInerney et al. 1981

Species of bacterium

Syntrophomonas wolfei is a bacterium. It is anaerobic, syntrophic and fatty acid-oxidizing. It has a multilayered cell wall of the gram-negative type.
