= Dethiobacter =

Scientific classification
- Domain: Bacteria
- Kingdom: Bacillati
- Phylum: Bacillota
- Class: Clostridia
- Order: Syntrophomonadales
- Family: Syntrophomonadaceae
- Genus: Dethiobacter; Sorokin et al. 2008
- Species: D. alkaliphilus

Binomial name
- Dethiobacter alkaliphilus Sorokin et al. 2008

Type strain
- AHT 1, DSM 19026, UNIQEM U266

Genus of bacteria

Dethiobacter is a bacterial genus from the family Syntrophomonadaceae with one known species, Dethiobacter alkaliphilus.

Dethiobacter alkaliphilus has been isolated from sediments from a soda lake in the Mongolia.
