= Anaerobranca =

Scientific classification
- Domain: Bacteria
- Kingdom: Bacillati
- Phylum: Bacillota
- Class: Clostridia
- Order: Syntrophomonadales
- Family: Syntrophomonadaceae
- Genus: Anaerobranca; Engle et al. 1995

Type species
- Anaerobranca horikoshii Engle et al. 1995

Genus of bacteria

Anaerobranca is a genus in the phylum Bacillota (Bacteria).

== Etymology ==
The name Anaerobranca derives from:Greek prefix an (ἄν), not; Greek noun aer, aeros (ἀήρ, ἀέρος), air; New Latin feminine gender noun branca, claw, paw, the root of the English word branch, an arm-like part diverging from a main axis; New Latin feminine gender noun Anaerobranca, referring to the branched cell shape of the obligately anaerobic bacterium.

== Species ==
The genus contains 4 species, namely

- Anaerobranca californiensis ( Gorlenko et al. 2004, ; New Latin feminine gender adjective californiensis, pertaining to California, the location of the hot spring from which the micro-organism was isolated.)
- Anaerobranca gottschalkii ( Prowe and Antranikian 2001, ; New Latin genitive case noun gottschalkii, of Gottschalk, named after Gerhard Gottschalk, in recognition of his pioneering contributions to our knowledge of the physiology and metabolism of anaerobes.)
- Anaerobranca horikoshii ( Engle et al. 1995, (Type species of the genus).; New Latin genitive case noun horikoshii, of Horikoshi, in honor of Koki Horikoshi, a pioneer in the study of the microbiology of alkaliphilic bacteria.)
- Anaerobranca zavarzinii ( Kevbrin et al. 2008, ; New Latin masculine gender genitive case noun zavarzinii, of Zavarzin, named after the Russian microbiologist George Zavarzin, in recognition of his seminal contributions to the knowledge of alkaliphilic micro-organisms and their ecology.)
