= Carboxydocella thermautotrophica =

Scientific classification
- Domain: Bacteria
- Kingdom: Bacillati
- Phylum: Bacillota
- Class: Clostridia
- Order: Carboxydocellales
- Family: Carboxydocellaceae
- Genus: Carboxydocella
- Species: C. thermautotrophica

Binomial name
- Carboxydocella thermautotrophica Sokolova et al. 2002

Species of bacterium

Carboxydocella thermautotrophica is an anaerobic, CO-utilizing thermophile bacterium. It is Gram-positive bacterium, its cells being short, straight, motile rods; its type strain is 41(T) (= DSM 12356(T) = VKM B-2282(T)).
