= Methanocella =

Scientific classification
- Domain: Archaea
- Kingdom: Methanobacteriati
- Phylum: Methanobacteriota
- Class: "Methanomicrobia"
- Order: Methanocellales
- Family: Methanocellaceae
- Genus: Methanocella; Sakai et al. 2008

Type species
- Methanocella paludicola Sakai et al. 2008

Species
- M. arvoryzae; M. conradii; M. paludicola

Genus of archaea

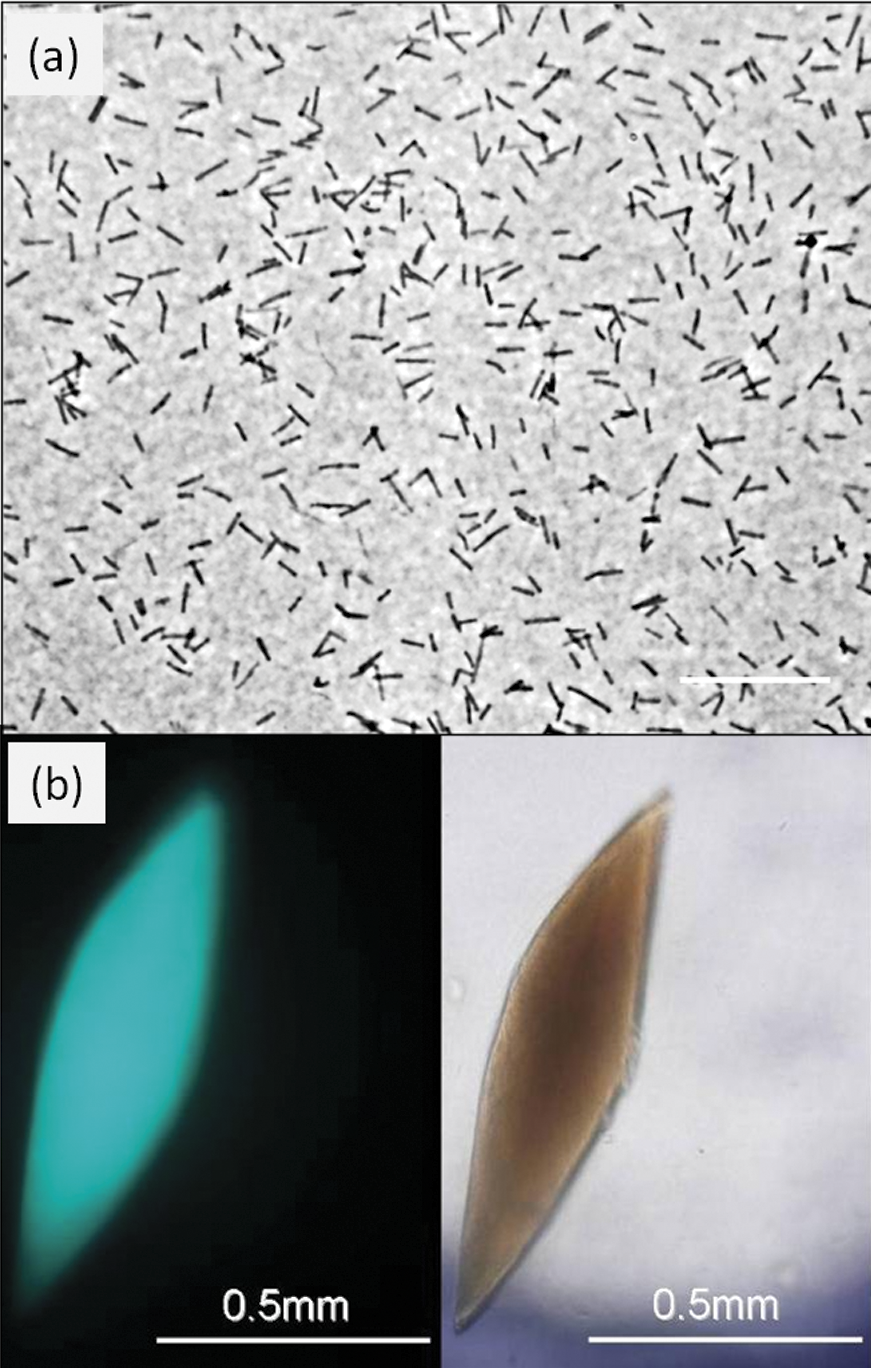
Methanocella conradii

Methanocella is a genus of archaeans in the phylum Methanobacteriota.

== Phylogeny ==
The currently accepted taxonomy is based on the List of Prokaryotic names with Standing in Nomenclature (LPSN) and National Center for Biotechnology Information (NCBI).

16S rRNA based LTP_07_2026

- Methanocella
  - M. arvoryzae
  - - M. conradii
    - M. paludicola

53 marker proteins based GTDB 11-RS232

- - - Methanooceanicella Zhang et al. 2024
    - - Methanocella_A
        Methanocella arvoryzae Sakai et al. 2010
  - - Methanocella
      - M. conradii Lu and Lu 2012
      - M. paludicola Sakai et al. 2008

== See also ==
- List of Archaea genera
