= Thermohydrogenium =

Scientific classification
- Domain: Bacteria
- Kingdom: Bacillati
- Phylum: Bacillota
- Class: Clostridia
- Order: Syntrophomonadales
- Family: Syntrophomonadaceae
- Genus: Thermohydrogenium; Zacharova et al. 1996

Type species
- Thermohydrogenium kirishiense

Species
- T. kirishiens

Genus of bacteria

Thermohydrogenium is an anaerobic and thermophilic bacterial genus from the family of Syntrophomonadaceae with one known species (Thermohydrogenium kirishiense).
