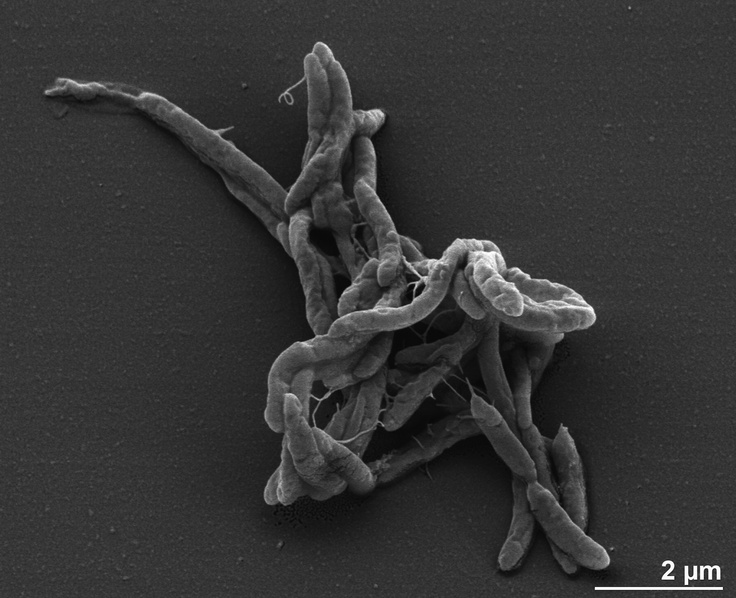
- Syntrophothermus lipocalidus

Scientific classification
- Domain: Bacteria
- Kingdom: Bacillati
- Phylum: Bacillota
- Class: Clostridia
- Order: Syntrophomonadales
- Family: Syntrophomonadaceae
- Genus: Syntrophothermus; Sekiguchi et al. 2000

Type species
- Syntrophothermus lipocalidus Sekiguchi et al. 2000

Species
- S. lipocalidus

= Syntrophothermus =

Genus of bacteria

Syntrophothermus is a bacterial genus from the family Syntrophomonadaceae. Up to now there is only one species of this genus known (Syntrophothermus lipocalidus).
