= Methanocorpusculaceae =

Scientific classification
- Domain: Archaea
- Kingdom: Methanobacteriati
- Phylum: Methanobacteriota
- Class: "Methanomicrobia"
- Order: Methanomicrobiales
- Family: Methanocorpusculaceae; Zellner et al. 1989

Genera
- Methanocalculus; Methanocorpusculum

Synonyms
- Methanocalculaceae Zhilina et al. 2014

Family of archaea

Methanocorpusculaceae is a family of microbes within the order Methanomicrobiales. It contains exactly one genus, Methanocorpusculum. The species within Methanocorpusculum were first isolated from anaerobic digesters and anaerobic wastewater treatment plants. In the wild, they prefer freshwater environments. Unlike many other methanogenic archaea, they do not require high temperatures or extreme salt concentrations to live and grow.

== Nomenclature ==
The name Methanocorpusculaceae has Latin roots. Overall, it means family of bodies that produce methane.

== Description and metabolism ==
The cells within this species are coccoid, small and irregular. They are Gram-negatives and not very motile. They reduce carbon dioxide to methane using hydrogen, but they can also use formate and secondary alcohols. They cannot use acetate or methylamines. They grow most quickly at 30–40 °C.

== Phylogeny ==
The currently accepted taxonomy is based on the List of Prokaryotic names with Standing in Nomenclature (LPSN) and National Center for Biotechnology Information (NCBI).

16S rRNA based LTP_07_2026

- - Methanocalculaceae
    Methanocalculus
  - Methanocorpusculaceae
    Methanocorpusculum

53 marker proteins based GTDB 11-RS232

- Methanocorpusculaceae
  - Methanocalculus
  - Methanocorpusculum

== See also ==
- List of Archaea genera
