= Methylamine-corrinoid protein Co-methyltransferase =

Identifiers
- EC no.: 2.1.1.248

Databases
- IntEnz: IntEnz view
- BRENDA: BRENDA entry
- ExPASy: NiceZyme view
- KEGG: KEGG entry
- MetaCyc: metabolic pathway
- PRIAM: profile
- PDB structures: RCSB PDB PDBe PDBsum
Search
- PMC: articles
- PubMed: articles
- NCBI: proteins

Methylamine-corrinoid protein Co-methyltransferase (EC 2.1.1.248, mtmB (gene), monomethylamine methyltransferase) is an enzyme with the systematic name monomethylamine:5-hydroxybenzimidazolylcobamide Co-methyltransferase. This enzyme catalyzes the following chemical reaction:

Methylamine + [Co(I) methylamine-specific corrinoid protein] $\rightleftharpoons$ [methyl-Co(III) methylamine-specific corrinoid protein] + Ammonia

This enzyme is involved in methanogenesis from methylamine.
