= Pelospora =

Scientific classification
- Domain: Bacteria
- Kingdom: Bacillati
- Phylum: Bacillota
- Class: Clostridia
- Order: Syntrophomonadales
- Family: Syntrophomonadaceae
- Genus: Pelospora; Matthies et al. 2000

Type species
- Pelospora glutarica Matthies et al. 2000

Species
- P. glutarica

Genus of bacteria

Pelospora is a Gram-negative strictly anaerobic and spore-forming bacterial genus from the family of Syntrophomonadaceae with one known species (Pelospora glutarica).

== See also ==
- List of bacterial orders
- List of bacteria genera
