= Interspecies hydrogen transfer =

Interspecies hydrogen transfer (IHT) is a form of interspecies electron transfer. It is a syntrophic process by which H_{2} is transferred from one organism to another, particularly in the rumen and other anaerobic environments.

IHT was discovered between Methanobacterium bryantii strain M.o.H and an "S" organism in 1967 by Marvin Bryant, Eileen Wolin, Meyer Wolin, and Ralph Wolfe at the University of Illinois. The two form a culture that was mistaken as a species Methanobacillus omelianskii. It was shown in 1973 that this process occurs between Ruminococcus albus and Wolinella succinogenes. A more recent publication describes how the gene expression profiles of these organisms changes when they undergo interspecies hydrogen transfer; of note, a switch to an electron-confurcating hydrogenase occurs in R. albus 7.

This process affects the carbon cycle: methanogens can participate in interspecies hydrogen transfer combining H_{2} and CO_{2} to produce CH_{4}. Besides methanogens, acetogens, and sulfate-reducing bacteria can participate in IHT.
