= Thermosyntropha =

Scientific classification
- Domain: Bacteria
- Kingdom: Bacillati
- Phylum: Bacillota
- Class: Clostridia
- Order: Syntrophomonadales
- Family: Syntrophomonadaceae
- Genus: Thermosyntropha; Svetlitshnyi, Rainey & Wiegel 1996

Type species
- Thermosyntropha lipolytica Svetlitshnyi, Rainey & Wiegel 1996

Species
- T. lipolytica; T. tengcongensis

Genus of bacteria

Thermosyntropha is an anaerobic, thermophilic, and heterotrophic bacterial genus from the family Syntrophomonadaceae.

== Phylogeny ==
The currently accepted taxonomy is based on the List of Prokaryotic names with Standing in Nomenclature (LPSN) and National Center for Biotechnology Information (NCBI).

16S rRNA based LTP_10_2024

- Thermosyntropha
  - T. lipolytica Svetlitshnyi, Rainey & Wiegel 1996
  - T. tengcongensis Zhang, Liu & Dong 2012

120 marker proteins based GTDB 10-RS226

- Thermosyntropha
  T. lipolytica
