= Methanosaetaceae =

Scientific classification
- Domain: Archaea
- Kingdom: Methanobacteriati
- Phylum: Methanobacteriota
- Class: "Methanomicrobia"
- Order: Methanosarcinales
- Family: Methanosaetaceae; Boone, Whitman & Koga 2002

Genus
- "Methanocrinis"; Methanosaeta

Synonyms
- Methanotrichaceae Akinyemi et al. 2021

Family of archaea

Methanosaetaceae is a family of microbes within the order Methanosarcinales. All species within this family use acetate as their sole source of energy.

== See also ==
- List of Archaea genera
