= Syntrophy =

Cooperation between microbial species to digest a substrate

In biology, syntrophy, syntrophism, or cross-feeding (from Greek syn 'together' and trophe 'nourishment') is the cooperative interaction between at least two microbial species to degrade a single substrate. This type of biological interaction typically involves the transfer of one or more metabolic intermediates between two or more metabolically diverse microbial species living in close proximity to each other. Thus, syntrophy can be considered an obligatory interdependency and a mutualistic metabolism between different microbial species, wherein the growth of one partner depends on the nutrients, growth factors, or substrates provided by the other(s).

== Microbial syntrophy ==
Syntrophy is often used synonymously for mutualistic symbiosis especially between at least two different bacterial species. Syntrophy differs from symbiosis in a way that syntrophic relationship is primarily based on closely linked metabolic interactions to maintain thermodynamically favorable lifestyle in a given environment. Syntrophy plays an important role in a large number of microbial processes especially in oxygen limited environments, methanogenic environments and anaerobic systems. In anoxic or methanogenic environments such as wetlands, swamps, paddy fields, landfills, digestive tract of ruminants, and anerobic digesters syntrophy is employed to overcome the energy constraints as the reactions in these environments proceed close to thermodynamic equilibrium.

=== Mechanism of microbial syntrophy ===
The main mechanism of syntrophy is removing the metabolic end products of one species so as to create an energetically favorable environment for another species. This obligate metabolic cooperation is required to facilitate the degradation of complex organic substrates under anaerobic conditions. Complex organic compounds such as ethanol, propionate, butyrate, and lactate cannot be directly used as substrates for methanogenesis by methanogens. On the other hand, fermentation of these organic compounds cannot occur in fermenting microorganisms unless the hydrogen concentration is reduced to a low level by the methanogens. The key mechanism that ensures the success of syntrophy is interspecies electron transfer. The interspecies electron transfer can be carried out via three ways: interspecies hydrogen transfer, interspecies formate transfer and interspecies direct electron transfer. Reverse electron transport is prominent in syntrophic metabolism.

The metabolic reactions and the energy involved for syntrophic degradation with H_{2} consumption:

A classical syntrophic relationship can be illustrated by the activity of Methanobacillus omelianskii. It was isolated several times from anaerobic sediments and sewage sludge and was regarded as a pure culture of an anaerobe converting ethanol to acetate and methane. In fact, however, the culture turned out to consist of a methanogenic archaeon "organism M.o.H" and a Gram-negative Bacterium "Organism S" which involves the oxidization of ethanol into acetate and methane mediated by interspecies hydrogen transfer. Individuals of organism S are observed as obligate anaerobic bacteria that use ethanol as an electron donor, whereas M.o.H are methanogens that oxidize hydrogen gas to produce methane.

Organism S: 2 Ethanol + 2 H_{2}O → 2 Acetate^{−} + 2 H^{+} + 4 H_{2} (ΔG°' = +9.6 kJ per reaction)

Strain M.o.H.: 4 H_{2} + CO_{2} → Methane + 2 H_{2}O (ΔG°' = -131 kJ per reaction)

Co-culture: 2 Ethanol + CO_{2} → 2 Acetate^{−} + 2 H^{+} + Methane (ΔG°' = -113 kJ per reaction)

The oxidization of ethanol by organism S is made possible thanks to the methanogen M.o.H, which consumes the hydrogen produced by organism S, by turning the positive Gibbs free energy into negative Gibbs free energy. This situation favors growth of organism S and also provides energy for methanogens by consuming hydrogen. Down the line, acetate accumulation is also prevented by similar syntrophic relationship. Syntrophic degradation of substrates like butyrate and benzoate can also happen without hydrogen consumption.

An example of propionate and butyrate degradation with interspecies formate transfer carried out by the mutual system of Syntrophomonas wolfei and Methanobacterium formicicum:

Propionate + 2H_{2}O + 2CO_{2} → Acetate^{−} + 3Formate^{−} + 3H^{+} (ΔG°'=+65.3 kJ/mol)

Butyrate + 2H2O + 2CO_{2} → 2Acetate- + 3Formate- + 3H^{+} (ΔG°'=+38.5 kJ/mol)

Direct interspecies electron transfer (DIET) which involves electron transfer without any electron carrier such as H_{2} or formate was reported in the co-culture system of Geobacter mettalireducens and Methanosaeto or Methanosarcina

== Examples ==
=== In ruminants ===
The defining feature of ruminants, such as cows and goats, is a stomach called a rumen. The rumen contains billions of microbes, many of which are syntrophic. Some anaerobic fermenting microbes in the rumen (and other gastrointestinal tracts) are capable of degrading organic matter to short chain fatty acids, and hydrogen. The accumulating hydrogen inhibits the microbe's ability to continue degrading organic matter, but the presence of syntrophic hydrogen-consuming microbes allows continued growth by metabolizing the waste products. In addition, fermentative bacteria gain maximum energy yield when protons are used as electron acceptor with concurrent H_{2} production. Hydrogen-consuming organisms include methanogens, sulfate-reducers, acetogens, and others.

Some fermentation products, such as fatty acids longer than two carbon atoms, alcohols longer than one carbon atom, and branched chain and aromatic fatty acids, cannot directly be used in methanogenesis. In acetogenesis processes, these products are oxidized to acetate and H_{2} by obligated proton reducing bacteria in syntrophic relationship with methanogenic archaea as low H_{2} partial pressure is essential for acetogenic reactions to be thermodynamically favorable (ΔG < 0).

=== Biodegradation of pollutants ===
Syntrophic microbial food webs play an integral role in bioremediation especially in environments contaminated with crude oil and petrol. Environmental contamination with oil is of high ecological importance and can be effectively mediated through syntrophic degradation by complete mineralization of alkane, aliphatic and hydrocarbon chains. The hydrocarbons of the oil are broken down after activation by fumarate, a chemical compound that is regenerated by other microorganisms. Without regeneration, the microbes degrading the oil would eventually run out of fumarate and the process would cease. This breakdown is crucial in the processes of bioremediation and global carbon cycling.

Syntrophic microbial communities are key players in the breakdown of aromatic compounds, which are common pollutants. The degradation of aromatic benzoate to methane produces intermediate compounds such as formate, acetate, CO_{2} and H_{2}. The buildup of these products makes benzoate degradation thermodynamically unfavorable. These intermediates can be metabolized syntrophically by methanogens and makes the degradation process thermodynamically favorable

=== Degradation of amino acids ===
Studies have shown that bacterial degradation of amino acids can be significantly enhanced through the process of syntrophy. Microbes growing poorly on amino acid substrates alanine, aspartate, serine, leucine, valine, and glycine can have their rate of growth dramatically increased by syntrophic H_{2} scavengers. These scavengers, like Methanospirillum and Acetobacterium, metabolize the H_{2} waste produced during amino acid breakdown, preventing a toxic build-up. Another way to improve amino acid breakdown is through interspecies electron transfer mediated by formate. Species like Desulfovibrio employ this method. Amino acid fermenting anaerobes such as Clostridium species, Peptostreptococcus asacchaarolyticus, Acidaminococcus fermentans were known to breakdown amino acids like glutamate with the help of hydrogen scavenging methanogenic partners without going through the usual Stickland fermentation pathway

=== Anaerobic digestion ===
Effective syntrophic cooperation between propionate oxidizing bacteria, acetate oxidizing bacteria and H_{2}/acetate consuming methanogens is necessary to successfully carryout anaerobic digestion to produce biomethane

== Syntrophic theories of eukaryogenesis ==
Many symbiogenetic models of eukaryogenesis propose that the first eukaryotic cells were derived from endosymbiosis facilitated by microbial syntrophy between prokaryotic cells. Most of these models involve an archaeon and an alphaproteobacterium, where the dependence of the archaeon on the alphaproteobacterium leads the former to engulf the latter, the alphaproteobacterium then eventually becoming the mitochondria. While these models share the concept of syntrophic interaction as a key driver of endosymbiosis, they often differ on the exact nature of the metabolic interactions involved and the mechanisms by which eukaryogenesis occurred.

=== Hydrogen hypothesis ===
In 1998, William F. Martin and Miklós Müller introduced the hydrogen hypothesis, proposing that eukaryotes arose from syntrophic associations based on the transfer of H_{2}. In this model, an syntrophic association arose where a anaerobic autotrophic methanogenic archaeon was dependent on the H_{2} made as a byproduct of anaerobic respiration by a facultatively anaerobic alphaproteobacterium. This syntrophy led the alphaproteobacterium to become an endosymbiont of the archaeon, serving as the precursor to the mitochondria.

=== Dennis Searcy model ===
Dennis Searcy proposed that the precursors to mitochondria were parasitic bacteria that developed a syntrophy with their hosts based upon the transfer of organic acids, H_{2} transfer, and the reciprocal exchange of sulfur compounds.

=== Reverse flow model ===
The reverse flow model was created based on the metabolic analysis of Asgard archaea, which is thought to be the kingdom from which eukaryotes emerged. This model proposes that a syntrophic association arose where anaerobic ancestral Asgard archaea generated and provided reducing equivalents that facultative anaerobic alphaproteobacteria used in the form of H_{2}, small reduced compounds, or by direct electron transfer.

=== Entangle-Engulf-Endogenize model ===
The Entangle-Engulf-Endogenize (E3) model was created in 2020 based on the isolation of syntrophic archaea from deep sea marine sediment. Unlike most other symbiogenetic models, the E3 model involves three separate types of microbes: a fermentative archaeon, a facultatively aerobic organotroph (which was acts as the precursor of the mitochondria), and sulfur-reducing bacteria (SRB). This model proposes that, originally, the fermentative archaeon may have degraded amino acids via syntrophic association with SRB and the facultatively aerobic organotroph. As oxygen levels began to rise, however, the interaction with the facultatively aerobic organotroph (which is thought to have made the archaeon more aerotolerant) became stronger became stronger until it was engulfed (a process facilitated by syntrophic interaction with SRB). Additionally, the E3 model suggests that, instead of phagocytizing the facultatively aerobic organotroph, the archaeon used extracellular structures to enhance interactions and engulf the facultatively aerobic organotroph.

=== Syntrophy hypothesis ===
The syntrophy hypothesis was proposed in 2001 by researchers Purificación López-García and David Moreira before being refined in 2020 by the same researchers. Similarly to the E3 model, the syntrophy hypothesis suggests that eukaryogenesis involved three different types of microbes: a complex sulfate-reducing deltaproteobacterium (the precursor to the cytoplasm), an H_{2}-producing Asgard archaeon (the precursor to the nucleus), and a facultatively aerobic sulfide-oxidizing alphaproteobacterium (the precursor to mitochondria). In this model, the deltaproteobacteria forms syntrophic associations with both the Asgard archaeon (based on the transfer of H_{2}) and the alphaproteobacterium (based on the redox of sulfur), leading both to become endosymbionts of the deltaproteobacteria. In this now obligatory symbiosis, organic compounds were degraded in the periplasmic space of the deltaproteobacteria before being moved to the archaeon for further degradation. This interaction drove the periplasm to develop and expand in close proximity with the archaeon to facilitate molecular exchange, resulting in an endomembrane system, transport channels, and the loss of the archaeal membrane. Ultimately, the archaeon became the nucleus while the periplasmic endomembrane system became the endoplasmic reticulum. Meanwhile, the consortium lost the metabolic capability for bacterial sulfate reduction and archaeal energy metabolism as it became more reliant on aerobic respiration performed by the alphaproteobacterium which, ultimately, became the mitochondrion.

== Examples of syntrophic organisms ==
- Syntrophomonas wolfei is a gram-negative, anaerobic, fatty-acid oxidizing bacterium that forms syntrophic associations with H_{2}-using bacteria.
- Syntrophobacter fumaroxidans is a gram-negative anaerobic bacterium that can oxidize propionate in pure cultures or in syntrophic association with Methanospirillum hungateii.
- Pelotomaculum thermopropionicum is a thermophilic, anaerobic, syntrophic propionate-oxidizing bacterium that, in co-culture with Methanothermobacter thermautotrophicus, can grow on propionate, ethanol, lactate, 1-butanol, 1-pentanol, 1,3-propanediol, 1-propanol, and ethylene glycol.
- Syntrophus aciditrophicus is a gram-negative, obligately anaerobic, nonmotile, rod-shaped bacterium that, in syntrophic association with hydrogen/formate-using methanogens or sulfate reducers, degrades benzoate and fatty acids.
- Syntrophus buswellii is a gram-negative, anaerobic, motile, rod-shaped bacterium that, in syntrophic association with H_{2}-using bacteria, degrades benzoate.
- Syntrophus gentianae is a obligately anaerobic bacterium that ferments benzoate in syntrophic association with H_{2}-using bacteria.
