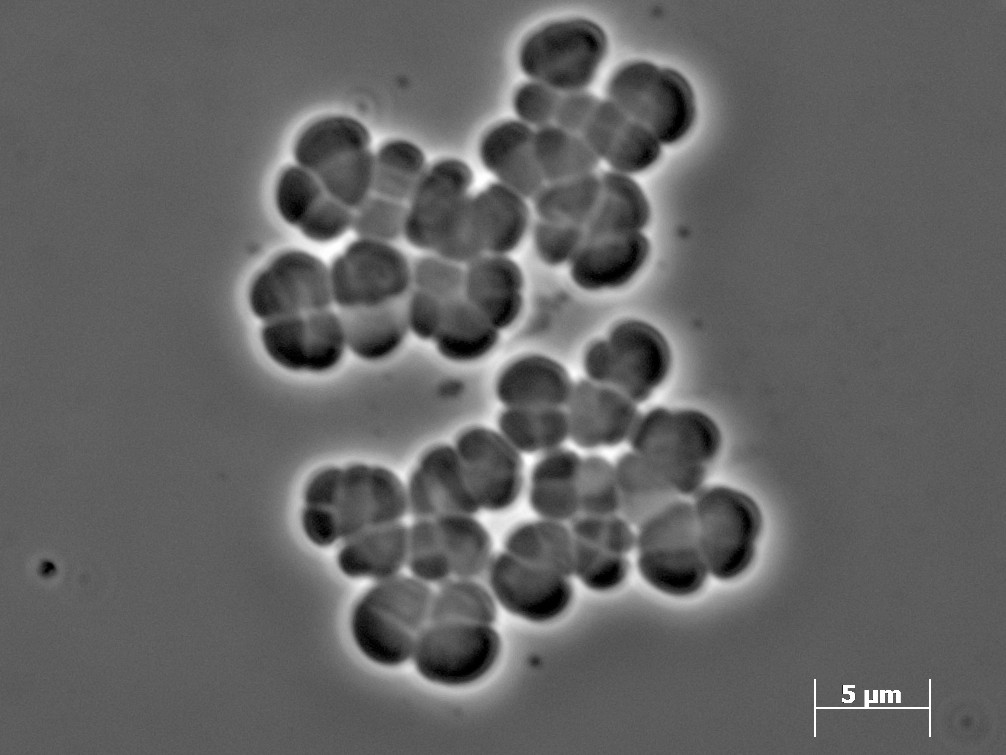
- Phase-contrast photo of Methanosarcina barkeri, type strain MS^{T}

Scientific classification
- Domain: Archaea
- Kingdom: Methanobacteriati
- Phylum: Methanobacteriota
- Class: "Methanomicrobia"
- Order: Methanosarcinales
- Family: Methanosarcinaceae; Balch and Wolfe 1981

Genera
- See text

= Methanosarcinaceae =

Family of archaea

Methanosarcinaceae is a family of archaeans in the order Methanosarcinales.

== Phylogeny ==
The currently accepted taxonomy is based on the List of Prokaryotic names with Standing in Nomenclature (LPSN) and National Center for Biotechnology Information (NCBI).

16S rRNA based LTP_07_2026

- Methanosarcinaceae
  - - Methanohalobium
    - Methanosalsum
  - - - Methanococcoides
      - Methanohalophilus
    - - - Methanomethylovorans
        - Methanolobus
      - - - Methanolapillus
          - Methanimicrococcus
        - Methanosarcina

53 marker proteins based GTDB 11-RS232

- Methanosarcinaceae
  - - - "Methanofrustulum" Protasov & Brune 2023
      - - Methanolapillus Protasov & Brune 2025
        - Methanimicrococcus Sprenger et al. 2000
    - Methanosarcina Kluyver and van Niel 1936
  - - - Methanohalobium Zhilina & Zavarzin 1988
      - Methanosalsum Boone and Baker 2002
    - - "Ca. Methanovorans" Chadwick et al. 2022
      - - - Methanococcoides Sowers and Ferry 1985
          - Methanohalophilus Paterek and Smith 1988
        - - Methanomethylovorans Lomans et al. 2004
          - Methanolobus König and Stetter 1983

Unassigned gerea:

- Halomethanococcus Yu & Kawamura 1988

== Biochemistry ==
A notable trait of Methanosarcinaceae is that they are methanogens that incorporate the unusual amino acid pyrrolysine into their enzymes. The enzyme monomethylamine methyltransferase catalyzes the reaction of monomethylamine to methane. This enzyme includes pyrrolysine. The unusual amino acid is inserted using a unique tRNA, the anticodon of which is UAG. In most organisms, and in most Methanosarcinaceae proteins, UAG is a stop codon. However, in this enzyme, and anywhere else pyrrolysine is incorporated, likely through contextual markers on the mRNA, the pyrrolysine-loaded tRNA is inserted instead of the release factor. They also have a unique aminoacyl-tRNA synthetase to specifically load this tRNA with pyrrolysine. This unique adaptation is still the subject of significant study.

== See also ==
- List of Archaea genera
