= Methanomicrobiaceae =

Scientific classification
- Domain: Archaea
- Kingdom: Methanobacteriati
- Phylum: Methanobacteriota
- Class: "Methanomicrobia"
- Order: Methanomicrobiales
- Family: Methanomicrobiaceae; Balch and Wolfe 1981

Genera
- Methanochimaera; Methanogenium; Methanolacinia; Methanomicrobium; Methanoplanus; Methanovulcanius

Synonyms
- Methanoplanaceae Wildgruber et al. 1984

Family of archaea

Methanomicrobiaceae are a family of archaea in the order the Methanomicrobiales.

== Phylogeny ==
The currently accepted taxonomy is based on the List of Prokaryotic names with Standing in Nomenclature (LPSN) and National Center for Biotechnology Information (NCBI).

16S rRNA based LTP_07_2026

- Methanomicrobiaceae
  - Methanovulcanius
  - - Methanogenium
    - - Methanolacinia
      - - Methanomicrobium
        - - Methanochimaera
          - Methanoplanus

53 marker proteins based GTDB 11-RS232

- Methanomicrobiaceae
  - - Methanovulcanius Chien et al. 2023
    - Methanogenium Romesser et al. 1981
  - - Methanoplanus Wildgruber et al. 1984
    - - Methanolacinia Zellner et al. 1990
      - - Methanochimaera Zhou et al. 2024
        - Methanomicrobium Balch & Wolfe 1981

== See also ==
- List of Archaea genera
