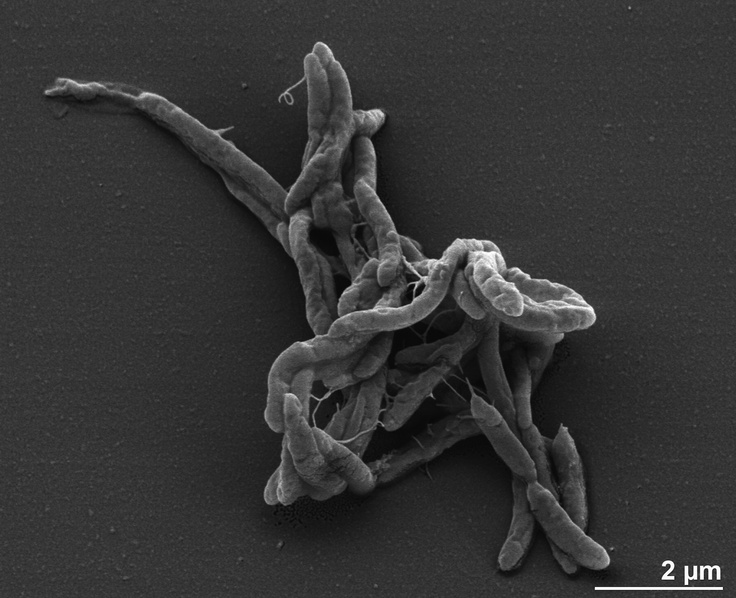
- Syntrophothermus lipocalidus

Scientific classification
- Domain: Bacteria
- Kingdom: Bacillati
- Phylum: Bacillota
- Class: Clostridia
- Order: Syntrophomonadales
- Family: Syntrophomonadaceae; Zhao et al. 1993

Genera
- Anaerobranca; "Ca. Contubernalis"; Dethiobacter; "Natronoanaerobium"; Pelospora; "Ca. Syntrophocurvum"; "Ca. Syntrophofaba"; Syntrophomonas; "Ca. Syntrophonatronum"; Syntrophothermus; Thermohydrogenium; Thermosyntropha; "Ca. Thermosyntrophomonas"

= Syntrophomonadaceae =

Family of bacteria

The Syntrophomonadaceae are a family of anaerobic bacteria in the class Clostridia. As a source of energy, these organisms use carboxylic acids.

== Phylogeny ==
The currently accepted taxonomy is based on the List of Prokaryotic names with Standing in Nomenclature (LPSN) and National Center for Biotechnology Information (NCBI).

16S rRNA based LTP_10_2024

- Syntrophomonadaceae
  - Syntrophothermus
  - - Thermosyntropha
    - Syntrophomonas [incl. Pelospora]

120 marker proteins based GTDB 10-RS226

- Syntrophomonadales
  - Syntrophothermaceae
    Syntrophothermus
  - Syntrophomonadaceae
    - Syntrophomonas zehnderi
    - - "Ca. Syntrophocurvum" Sorokin et al. 2016
      - - Thermosyntropha Svetlitshnyi, Rainey & Wiegel 1996
        - Syntrophomonas McInerney et al. 1982 [incl. Pelospora Matthies et al. 2000]
