= Methanomicrobiales =

Scientific classification
- Domain: Archaea
- Kingdom: Methanobacteriati
- Phylum: Methanobacteriota
- Class: "Methanomicrobia"
- Order: Methanomicrobiales; Balch and Wolfe 1981

Families
- Methanocalculaceae; Methanocorpusculaceae; Methanoculleaceae; Methanofollaceae; Methanospirillaceae; Methanomicrobiaceae; Methanoregulaceae; Methanosphaerulaceae

Order of archaea

Methanomicrobiales is an order of archaeans in the phylum Methanobacteriota. Methanomicrobiales are strictly carbon dioxide reducing methanogens, using hydrogen or formate as the reducing agent. As seen from the phylogenetic tree based on 'The All-Species Living Tree' Project the family Methanomicrobiaceae is highly polyphyletic within the Methanomicrobiales.

== Phylogeny ==
The currently accepted taxonomy is based on the List of Prokaryotic names with Standing in Nomenclature (LPSN) and National Center for Biotechnology Information (NCBI).

16S rRNA based LTP_07_2026

- - Methanofollaceae Chuvochina et al. 2024
  - - - - Methanocorpusculaceae Zellner et al. 1989
        - Methanocalculaceae Zhilina et al. 2014
      - - Methanospirillaceae Boone, Whitman & Koga 2002
        - Methanoregulaceae Sakai et al. 2012 (incl. Methanosphaerulaceae)
    - - Methanomicrobiaceae Balch & Wolfe 1981
      - Methanoculleaceae Chuvochina et al. 2024

53 marker proteins based GTDB 11-RS232

- - Methanofollaceae
  - - Methanocorpusculaceae (incl. Methanocalculaceae)
    - - Methanospirillaceae (incl. Methanosphaerulaceae, Methanoregulaceae)
      - - Methanomicrobiaceae
        - Methanoculleaceae

== See also ==
- List of Archaea genera
