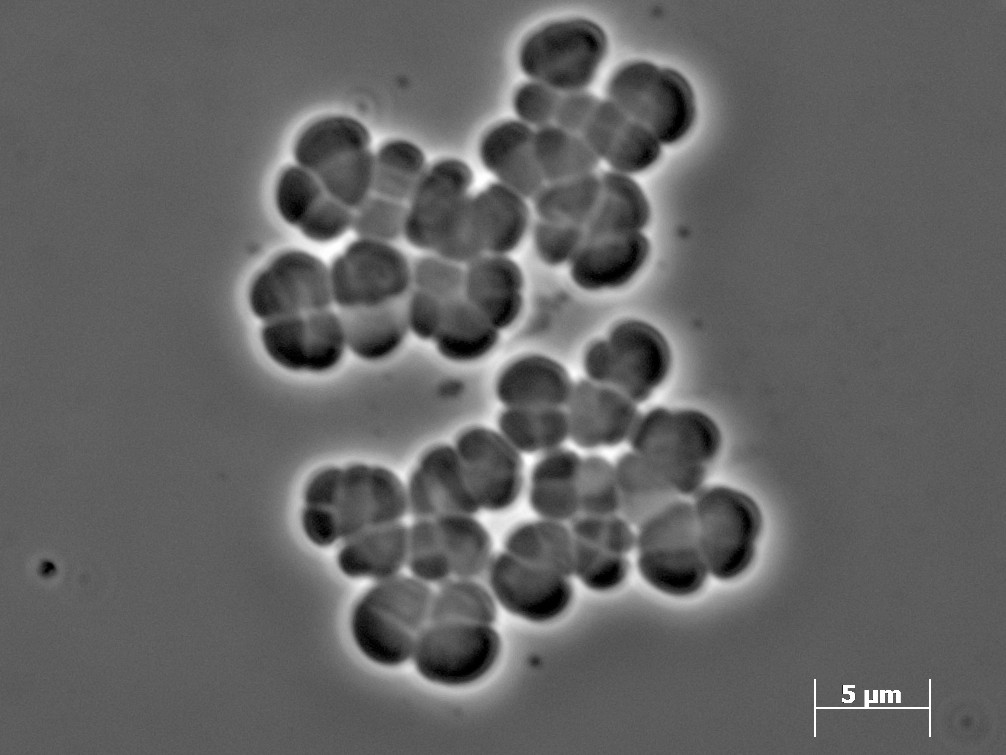
- Methanosarcina barkeri MS

Scientific classification
- Domain: Archaea
- Kingdom: Methanobacteriati
- Phylum: Methanobacteriota
- Class: "Methanomicrobia"
- Order: Methanosarcinales; Boone et al. 2002

Families
- Methanosarcinaceae; Methanotrichaceae; Methermicoccaceae

Synonyms
- Methanotrichales Akinyemi et al. 2021

= Methanosarcinales =

Order of methanogenic archaea

Methanosarcinales is an order of Archaea in the class Methanomicrobia, phylum Methanobacteriota. The order Methanosarcinales contains both methanogenic and methanotrophic lineages, although the latter have so far no pure culture representatives. Methanotrophic lineages of the order Methanosarcinales were initially abbreviated as ANME (anaerobic methanotrophs) to distinguich from aerobic methanotrophic bacteria. Currently, those lineages receive their own names such as Ca. Methanoperedens, Ca. Methanocomedens (ANME-2a), Ca.Methanomarinus (ANME-2b), Ca. Methanogaster (ANME-2c), Ca. Methanovorans (ANME-3). The order contains archaeon with one of the largest genome, Methanosarcina acetivorans C2A, genome size 5,75 Mbp.

The organisms placed within the order can be found in freshwater, saltwater, salt-rich sediments, anaerobic digestors, and animal digestive systems. The order consist of mesophiles or moderately thermophillic, neutrophilic or alkaliphilic species with some able to grow at high salt concentrations (genera Methanohalobium, Methanohalophilus, and Methanosalsum). Most of the species in the order were isolated or detected in marine and freshwater sediments, soil with only a few specialized lineages adapted to the digestive tract of animals - genera Methanimicrococcus, Methanolapillus, and Ca. Methanofrustulum that can be found in termites/cockroaches, millipedes, and ruminants, respectively.

Most cells have cell walls that lack peptidoglycan and pseudomurein with notable presence of methanochondroitin in Methanosarcina genus. As all other methanogens, Methanosarcinales representatives are strictly anaerobic and utilize methanogenesis pathway as the only path for ATP production. However, besides other common methanogenic substrates H_{2}/CO_{2}, Methanosarcinales characterized by the ability to utilize acetate (aceticlastic methanogenesis), methylated compounds such as methanol or methylamines (methylotrophic methanogenesis), or even methoxylated aromatic compounds (methoxydotrophic methanogenesis).

== Phylogeny ==
The currently accepted taxonomy is based on the List of Prokaryotic names with Standing in Nomenclature (LPSN) and National Center for Biotechnology Information (NCBI).

16S rRNA based LTP_07_2026

- Methanosarcinales
  - Methanotrichaceae [incl. Methanosaetaceae]
  - - Methermicoccaceae
    - Methanosarcinaceae

53 marker proteins based GTDB 11-RS232

- - - Methanosarcinales_A
      Methermicoccaceae
    - Methanotrichales
      Methanotrichaceae [incl. Methanosaetaceae]
  - - Methanosarcinales
      - - "Methanocomedentaceae" (ANME-2a, ANME-2b)
        - - "Ethanoperedentaceae" (EX4572-44)
          - "Methanoperedentaceae" (ANME-2d, AAA)
      - - "Methanogastraceae" (ANME-2c)
        - Methanosarcinaceae

The order Methanosarcinales contains the following families (genera comprising each family listed below corresponding family):

=== Methanosarcinaceae Balch and Wolfe 1981 ===
- Methanimicrococcus corrig. Sprenger et al. 2000
- Methanococcoides Sowers and Ferry 1985
- Methanohalobium Zhilina and Zavarzin 1988
- Methanohalophilus Paterek and Smith 1988
- Methanolobus König and Stetter 1983
- Methanomethylovorans Lomans et al. 2004
- Methanosalsum Boone and Baker 2002
- Methanosarcina Kluyver and van Niel 1936

=== Methanotrichaceae Akinyemi et al. 2021 ===
- Methanothrix Huser et al. 1983

=== Methermicoccaceae Cheng et al. 2007 ===
- Methermicoccus Cheng et al. 2007

== See also ==
- List of Archaea genera
