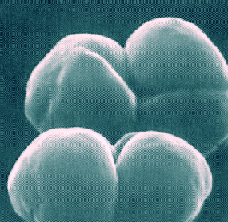
- Methanosarcina barkeri fusaro

Scientific classification
- Domain: Archaea
- Kingdom: Methanobacteriati
- Phylum: Methanobacteriota
- Class: "Methanomicrobia"; Garrity, Bell & Lilburn 2003

Orders
- "Aerarchaeales"; "Alkanophagales"; Methanocellales; "Methanoflorentales"; Methanomicrobiales; "Methanoliparales"; Methanosarcinales; Methanotrichales; "Syntropharchaeales"

Synonyms
- Methanocellia Chuvochina et al. 2024; "Methanoliparia" Borrel et al. 2019; Methanosarcinia Chuvochina et al. 2024; "Syntropharchaeia" Rinke et al. 2021

= Methanomicrobia =

Class of archaea

"Methanomicrobia" is a class of archaeans in the phylum Methanobacteriota.

== Phylogeny ==
The currently accepted taxonomy is based on the List of Prokaryotic names with Standing in Nomenclature (LPSN) and National Center for Biotechnology Information (NCBI).

16S rRNA based LTP_07_2026

- - - Methanosarcinia
      Methanosarcinales
  - - Methanocellia
      Methanocellales
    - "Methanomicrobia"
      Methanomicrobiales

53 marker proteins based GTDB 11-RS232

- - - - "Methanoliparia"
        "Methanoliparales"
      - "Archaeoglobia"
        - "Mnemosynellales"
        - Archaeoglobales
    - - - Bog‑38
          "Methanoflorentales"
        - Methanocellia
          Methanocellales
      - - "Syntropharchaeia"
          - "Aerarchaeales" [JACQPP01]
          - - "Syntropharchaeales" (ANME-2)
            - "Alkanophagales" (ANME-1)
        - Methanosarcinia
          - - Methermicoccaceae {"Methanosarcinales_A"}
            - Methanotrichales
          - Methanosarcinales
  - - - "Methanomicrobia"
        Methanomicrobiales
    - Halobacteria

== See also ==
- List of Archaea genera
