= Pyrrolysine =

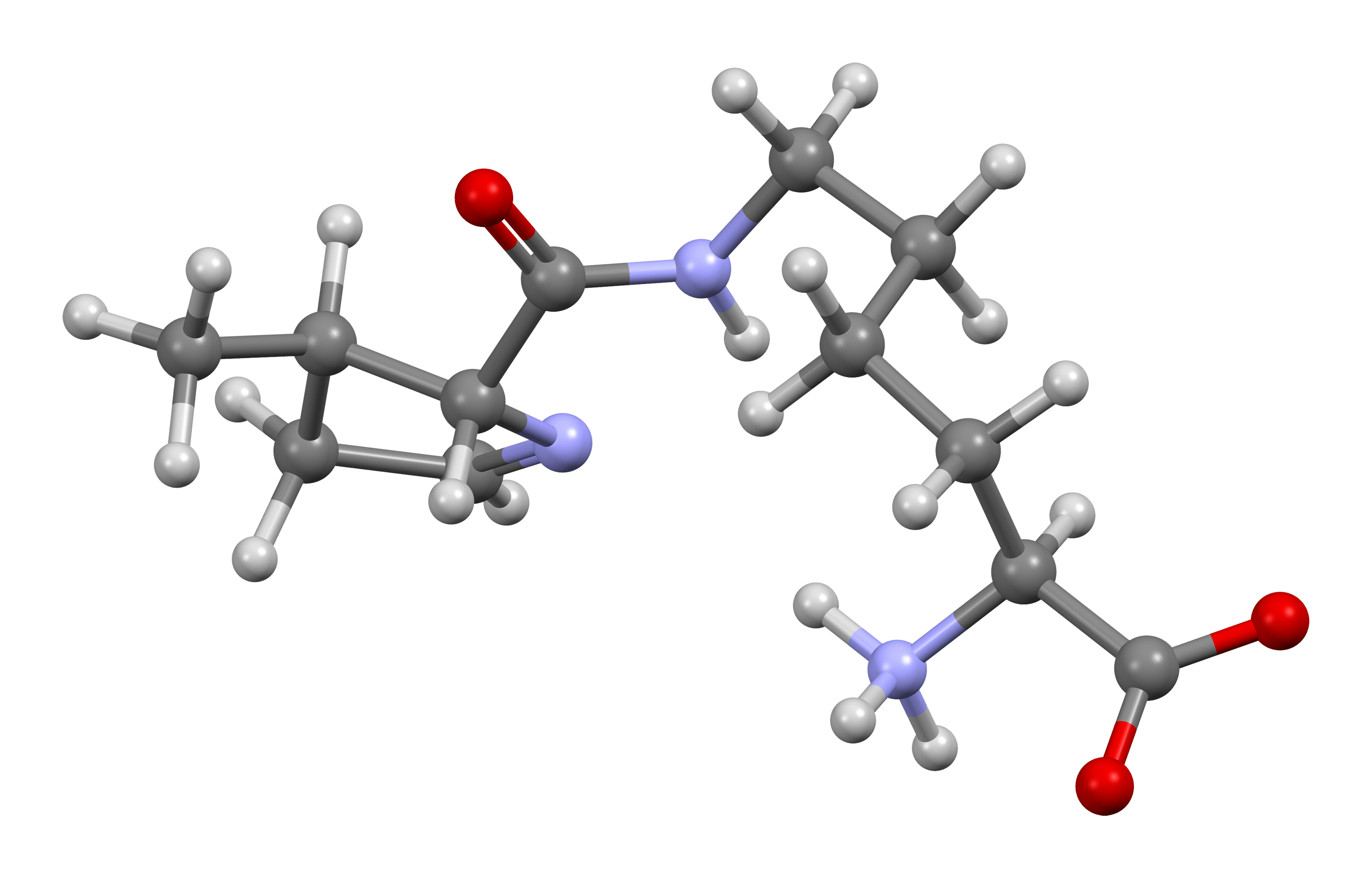

Names
- IUPAC name Pyrrolysine
- Systematic IUPAC name N^{6}-{[(2R,3R)-3-methyl-3,4-dihydro-2H-pyrrol-2-yl]carbonyl}-L-lysine
- Other names (2S)-2-amino-6-{[(2R,3R)-3-methyl-3,4-dihydro-2H-pyrrole-2-carbonyl]-amino}-hexanoic acid N^{6}-(4-methyl-1,2-didehydropyrrolidine-5-carboxyl)-L-lysine monomethylamine methyltransferase cofactor lysine adduct

Identifiers
CAS Number	448235-52-7
3D model (JSmol)	Interactive image; Zwitterion: Interactive image
ChEBI	CHEBI:21860
ChemSpider	4574156
KEGG	C16138
PubChem CID	5460671
UNII	H3214Y96LP
CompTox Dashboard (EPA)	DTXSID70420110
- InChI: InChI=1S/C12H21N3O3/c1-8-5-7-14-10(8)11(16)15-6-3-2-4-9(13)12(17)18/h7-10H,2-6,13H2,1H3,(H,15,16)(H,17,18)/t8-,9+,10-/m1/s1 Key: ZFOMKMMPBOQKMC-KXUCPTDWSA-N; InChI=1/C12H21N3O3/c1-8-5-7-14-10(8)11(16)15-6-3-2-4-9(13)12(17)18/h7-10H,2-6,13H2,1H3,(H,15,16)(H,17,18)/t8-,9+,10-/m1/s1 Key: ZFOMKMMPBOQKMC-KXUCPTDWBO
- SMILES: C[C@@H]1CC=N[C@H]1C(=O)NCCCC[C@@H](C(=O)O)N; Zwitterion: O=C(NCCCC[C@@H](C(=O)[O-])[NH3+])[C@@H]1/N=C\C[C@H]1C

Properties
Chemical formula	C_{12}H_{21}N_{3}O_{3}
Molar mass	255.313 g/mol
- Except where otherwise noted, data are given for materials in their standard state (at 25 °C [77 °F], 100 kPa). verify (what is ?) Infobox references

Pyrrolysine (symbol Pyl or O), encoded by the "amber" stop codon UAG, is a proteinogenic amino acid that is used in some methanogenic archaea and in bacteria. It consists of lysine with a 4-methylpyrroline-5-carboxylate in amide linkage with the ^{ε}N of the lysine. Its pyrroline side-chain is similar to that of lysine in being basic and positively charged at neutral pH.

== Genetics ==
Nearly all genes are translated using only 20 standard amino acid building blocks. Two unusual genetically encoded amino acids are selenocysteine and pyrrolysine. Pyrrolysine was discovered in 2002 at the active site of methyltransferase enzyme from a methane-producing archeon, Methanosarcina barkeri. This amino acid is encoded by UAG (normally a stop codon), and its synthesis and incorporation into protein is mediated via the biological machinery encoded by the pylTSBCD cluster of genes.

== Synthesis ==
Pyrrolysine is synthesized in vivo by joining two molecules of L-lysine. One molecule of lysine is first converted to (3R)-3-methyl-D-ornithine, which is then ligated to a second lysine. An NH_{2} group is eliminated, followed by cyclization and dehydration step to yield L-pyrrolysine.

== Catalytic function ==
The extra pyrroline ring is incorporated into the active site of several methyltransferases, where it is believed to rotate relatively freely. It is believed that the ring is involved in positioning and displaying the methyl group of methylamine for attack by a corrinoid cofactor. The proposed model is that a nearby carboxylic acid bearing residue, glutamate, becomes protonated, and the proton can then be transferred to the imine ring nitrogen, exposing the adjacent ring carbon to nucleophilic addition by methylamine. The positively charged nitrogen created by this interaction may then interact with the deprotonated glutamate, causing a shift in ring orientation and exposing the methyl group derived from the methylamine to the binding cleft where it can interact with corrinoid. In this way a net CH^{+}_{3} is transferred to the cofactor's cobalt atom with a change of oxidation state from +1 to +3. The methylamine-derived ammonia is then released, restoring the original imine.

== Genetic coding ==
Unlike posttranslational modifications of lysine such as hydroxylysine, methyllysine, and hypusine, pyrrolysine is incorporated during translation (protein synthesis) as directed by the genetic code, just like the standard amino acids. It is encoded in mRNA by the UAG codon, which in most organisms is the 'amber' stop codon. This requires only the presence of the pylT gene, which encodes an unusual transfer RNA (tRNA) with a CUA anticodon, and the pylS gene, which encodes a class II aminoacyl-tRNA synthetase that charges the pylT-derived tRNA with pyrrolysine.

It was originally proposed that a specific downstream sequence "PYLIS", forming a stem-loop in the mRNA, forced the incorporation of pyrrolysine instead of terminating translation in methanogenic archaea. This would be analogous to the SECIS element for selenocysteine incorporation. However, the PYLIS model has lost favor in view of the lack of structural homology between PYLIS elements and the lack of UAG stops in those species.

=== Use in bioengineering ===
The tRNA-aaRS pair for pyrrolysine ("orthogonal pair") is independent of other synthetases and tRNAs in most organisms including Escherichia coli, and further possesses some flexibility in the range of amino acids processed (the aaRS accepts some different molecules that are structurally similar to pyrrolysine), making it an attractive tool to allow the placement of a possibly wide range of functional chemical groups at arbitrarily specified locations in modified proteins. For example, the system provided one of two fluorophores incorporated site-specifically within calmodulin to allow the real-time examination of changes within the protein by FRET spectroscopy, and site-specific introduction of a photocaged lysine derivative. (See Expanded genetic code)

The recognition of a tRNA by an aaRS is by its acceptor stem sequence. The pyrrolysine tRNA can be modified to have an acceptor stem of another tRNA, allowing a different aaRS to act on it. In 2024, it was reported a version modified to accept alanine can effectively suppress premature termination codons (all three of them) in human cell lines.

== Evolution ==
The pylT (tRNA) and pylS (aa-tRNA synthase) genes are part of an operon of Methanosarcina barkeri, with homologues in other sequenced members of the Methanosarcinaceae family: M. acetivorans, M. mazei, and M. thermophila. Pyrrolysine-containing proteins are known to include monomethylamine methyltransferase (mtmB), dimethylamine methyltransferase (mtbB), and trimethylamine methyltransferase (mttB). Homologs of pylS and pylT have also been found in an Antarctic archaeon, Methanosarcina barkeri and a Gram-positive bacterium, Desulfitobacterium hafniense. The other genes of the Pyl operon mediate pyrrolysine biosynthesis, leading to description of the operon as a "natural genetic code expansion cassette".

A number of evolutionary scenarios have been proposed for the pyrrolysine system. The current (2022) view, given available sequences for tRNA and Pyl-tRNA (PylRS) synthase genes, is that:

- tRNA(Pyl) diverged from tRNA(Phe) some time between the divergence of the three domains (~LUCA) and the divergence of archaeal phyla, but was lost in non-archaeal lineages;
- PylRS originated within a common ancestor of all archaea. A number of domain organizations of PylRS is known: pylS itself consists of an N-terminal tRNA-binding domain and a C-terminal synthase domain, but other organizations consist of two domains in separate proteins or a protein made up of a lone C-terminal domain. The CTD probably originated from PheRS. The NTD is an archaeal innovation with no known relative. The ancestral PylRS probably adopted the "two separate proteins" configuration.
- The "genetic code expansion cassette" was later transferred into various bacteria. This cassette's PylRS has a split-domain configuration.

Earlier evolutionary scenarios were limited by the taxonomic range of known syntheses:

- In 2007, when use of the amino acid appeared confined to the Methanosarcinaceae, the system was described as a "late archaeal invention" by which a 21st amino acid was added to the genetic code. It is now known that a wide range of prokaryotes have these two genes.
- In 2009, structure comparison suggested that PylRS may have originated in the LUCA, but it only persisted in organisms using methylamines as energy sources. It is now known that some non-methanogens also have these two genes, but the dating was not too far off.
- In 2009, it was suggested that the system could have migrated into bacteria by horizontal gene transfer. This is probably true based on the 2022 study, though the paper originally assumed a link to methanogenesis.

=== Evolution of pyrrolysine methyltransferases ===
MttB, MtbB, and MtmB exhibit no obvious sequence homology. Solved crystal structures of MttB and MtmB show the same TIM barrel fold. Both are also homohexamers with D3 symmetry, but the relative positions in the homohexamer are different. Most importantly, the active-site pyrrolysine residue in both point toward the center of the TIM-barrel, but are located at completely different sides of the barrel. This suggests that the use of pyrrolysine was not a feature of the shared ancestor; instead, pyrrolysine may have evolved for use in one of these enzymes and was co-opted into the other two.

MttB is known to have several relatives without pyrrolysine in the MttB superfamily, all with high sequence similarity. Among all structures in the PDB as of 2023, the most similar (by structure and sequence identity) to MttB are the glycine betaine methyltransferase MtgB and a protein of unknown function 4YYC. MtmB is the third most similar structurally (among all PDB structures as of 2023) with a great decrease in similarity.

A non-pyrrolysine member of the MtmB superfamily was discovered via metagenomics of a "Ca. Formimonas warabiya" DCMF in 2022. The only thing known about its function is that its expression is increased in the presence of dichloromethane.

There has been no report of any member of the MtbB superfamily without pyrrolysine in literature as of 2025.

== Non-methyltransferase function ==
The tRNA^{His} guanylyltransferase gene Thg1 from the archaeon Methanosarcina acetivorans has a pyrrolysine residue. The gene works as usual if the pyrrolysine is substituted for other amino acids. In this case, the presence of Pyl results from simple neutral evolution. The insertion of Pyl into a protein requires no special signal in the mRNA, only a UAG codon, so it stands to reason that the barrier for changing a residue into Pyl in a protein sequence is the same as any other amino-acid substitution.

The bacterium Acetohalobium arabaticum has a serine dehydratase with two Pyl residues in addition to the regular methyltransferases. It also only expresses the Pyl machinery when trimethylamine is present. This conditional expression causes the bacterium to only produce a functional version of the serine dehydratase, the methyltransferases, and potentially the rest of its many proteins coded by a gene (about 20% of all its ORFs) with an in-frame TAG when trimethylamine is present. Although the incorporation of Pyl in those non-methyltransferase genes probably have no particular catalytic function, it has been adapted into a new way to regulate the production of protein products.

The prevalence of ORFs with a in-frame TAG is much smaller in archaeons, as expected for their "always-on" (constituent) expression of the Pyl machinery, at about 5%. Still, with a great number of genomes carrying the Pyl machinery in archaea, 5% is no small number. A study of 425 archaeal genomes with a Pyl machinery found 360 cases where a TAG occurs in the middle of a predicted protein with known non-TAG homologs. Some of these may have arisen through neutral mutations like previously described for Thg1 and indeed the rates are mostly consistent with random mutation. However, a few occurrences of Pyl are conserved and may reflect a new, beneficial function. In any case, the high prevalence of Pyl in some genomes, especially non-methanogenic ones, show that Pyl has become another regular piece of the genetic code in those lineages.

== Potential for an alternative translation ==
The tRNA_{CUA} can be charged with lysine in vitro by the concerted action of the M. barkeri Class I and Class II lysyl-tRNA synthetases (LysRS1 and LysRS2), neither of which recognizes pyrrolysine. Charging a tRNA_{CUA} with lysine was originally hypothesized to be the first step in translating UAG amber codons as pyrrolysine, a mechanism analogous to that used for selenocysteine. More recent data favor direct charging of pyrrolysine on to the tRNA_{CUA} by the protein product of the pylS gene, leading to the suggestion that the LysRS1:LysRS2 complex may participate in a parallel pathway designed to ensure that proteins containing the UAG codon can be fully translated using lysine as a substitute amino acid in the event of pyrrolysine deficiency. Further study found that the genes encoding LysRS1 and LysRS2 are not required for normal growth on methanol and methylamines with normal methyltransferase levels, and they cannot replace pylS in a recombinant system for UAG amber stop codon suppression.
