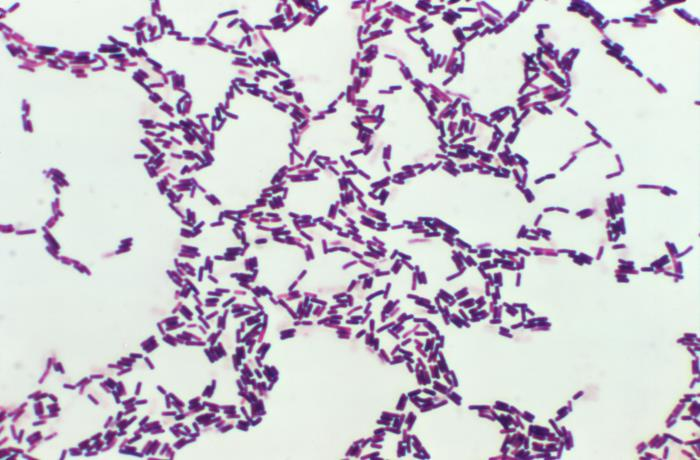
- Gram stain of Heyndrickxia coagulans

Scientific classification
- Domain: Bacteria
- Kingdom: Bacillati
- Phylum: Bacillota
- Class: Bacilli
- Order: Bacillales
- Family: Heyndrickxiaceae
- Genus: Heyndrickxia
- Species: H. coagulans

Binomial name
- Heyndrickxia coagulans (Hammer 1915) Narsing Rao et al. 2023

Synonyms
- Bacillus coagulans (Approved Lists 1980) emend. De Clerck et al. 2004; Lactobacillus sporogenes in Bergey's fifth ed.; Weizmannia coagulans (Hammer, 1915) Gupta et al., 2020

= Heyndrickxia coagulans =

Species of bacterium

Heyndrickxia coagulans (formerly Bacillus coagulans) is a lactic acid-forming bacterial species. This species was transferred to Weizmannia in 2020, then to Heyndrickxia in 2023.

== Description ==
H. coagulans is a catalase-positive, spore-forming, motile, facultative anaerobe rod shaped microbe. H. coagulans is usually seen as Gram positive when a Gram stain test is performed. However, if the Gram stain test is performed while H. coagulans is entering the stationary phase of growth the microbe may appear Gram negative. H. coagulans grows best at 50 °C (122 °F), but the microbe can sustain growth on a temperature range of 30–55 °C (86–131 °F).

== Taxonomic history ==
The species was first isolated and described in 1915 by B.W. Hammer at the Iowa Agricultural Experiment Station as a cause of an outbreak of coagulation in evaporated milk packed by an Iowa condensary. Separately isolated in 1935 and described as Lactobacillus sporogenes in the fifth edition of Bergey's Manual of Systematic Bacteriology, it exhibits characteristics typical of both genera Lactobacillus and Bacillus; its taxonomic position between the families Lactobacillaceae and Bacillaceae was often debated. However, in the seventh edition of Bergey's, it was finally transferred to the genus Bacillus. DNA-based technology was used in distinguishing between the two genera of bacteria, which are morphologically similar and possess similar physiological and biochemical characteristics.

In 2020, further genetic evidence shows that it is sufficiently different from other members of Bacillus to be transferred into its own genus. As a result, it became the type species of Weizmannia. In 2023, even further genetic evidence shows that Weizmannia was not sufficiently distinct from Heyndrickxia to be an independent genus; as a result, all members of Weizmannia were moved to Heyndrickxia.

== Microbiology ==
The bacterium H. coagulans has been found in various environments including an array of different fruits and vegetables such as potatoes, pickles, corn, and potatoes. In addition, H. coagulans appears in fermented rice and soil. The environmental persistence of this bacteria suggests a significant influence on its properties. The spores are activated in acidic environments such as the stomach and allow the bacteria to survive in a wide range of ecological niches. This creates the tolerance of H. coagulans to persist in gastric juices, bile salts, and adhere to intestinal mucosa, all essential traits for probiotic efficacy. Genome analysis confirmed antibiotic resistance of H. coagulans meaning it can withstand the presence of antibiotics and continue to live in the gut microbiome. Key genes associated with fermentation, stress response, and adhesion were found from genome mining of B. coagulans VHBAX-04. This strain also lacks pathogenicity-related genes, confirming its safety for human use. In fact, some genes identified are responsible for the production of peptides aiding in the suppression of pathogenic bacteria, and maintaining balance of gut microbiota. In-vitro tests performed on B. coagulans JBI-YZ6.3 demonstrated tolerance to gastrointestinal environments as well as storage stability.

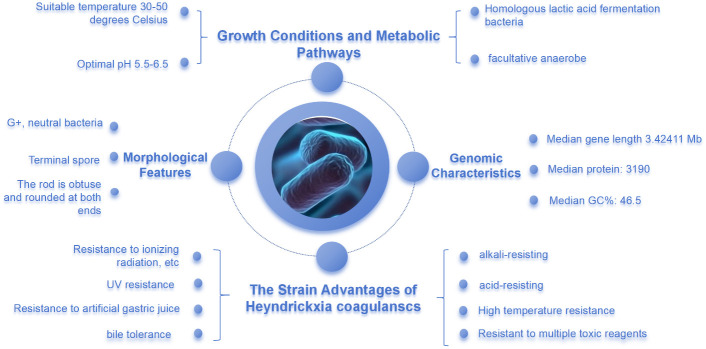
Biological Characteristics of Heyndrixckia coagulans.

=== Genome analysis ===
H. coagulans' genome consists of a circular chromosome containing over 3,000,000 base pairs, and over 3,400 genes. Of these genes over 97% accounted for coding sequencing genes while just over 100 code for RNA. The microbe has a genome completeness of over 90%. Genes associated with carbohydrate metabolism including xylA (xylose isomerase) and galT (UDP-glucose--hexose-1-phosphate uridylyl transferase) were identified through genome analysis of B. coagulans AO1167B, which equip this microbe to metabolize a diverse range of sugars allowing it to grow and produce energy in the gut microbiome. Other genes present which provides the bacteria with the ability to ferment lactose and other prebiotic sugars confirm a beneficial relationship with the hosts microbiome. Both ackA (acetate kinase) and pka (phosphotransacetylase) support H. coagulans' ability to produce acetate which support the integrity of the intestinal barrier and metabolic regulation. Other important genes such as bioB (biotin synthase) and thieE (thiamine phosphate synthase) allows the strain to synthesize essential vitamins including biotin, vitamin B12, and thiamine. This evaluation of the microbial genome of B. coagulans provides insightful information on the bacteria's ability to improve stress resistance, enhance immune response, and be used as an effective probiotic.

==== Motility ====
The bacterium H. coagulans is a motile species. The rod-shaped microbe is equipped with flagella. This is due to the contribution of genes that directly regulate flagellar assembly and function. Additionally, genomic analysis has also led to the discovery of genes present that are responsible for quorum sensing in the bacteria. This allows for communication between microbes by the sending and receiving of chemical signals within the species. These genes have a regulatory relationship with one another in regards to their functions. While the genes encoding for flagellar assembly do not directly cause quorum sensing, and the genes encoding for quorum sensing do not cause motility by flagella, they can enhance and regulate one another. This is because the flagella causes motility which in turn can cause an increase or decrease in quorum sensing. Reciprocally, quorum sensing can regulate the microbes motility from flagella as well. This is notable because these genes' relationship could encourage and enhance microbe colonization capabilities, making it more effective as a probiotic.

=== Metabolism ===
Heyndrickxia coagulans strain L-2 had about 79% of its total genes encoding for processes related to metabolism, cellular processes, and signal transmission. Specifically, pyruvate metabolism contained the highest number of annotated genes. This includes a bidirectional enzymatic reaction between pyruvate and phosphoenolpyruvate. This metabolic pathway is supported by coenzymes including acetic acid, ethanol, and L-lactic acid. L-2 also contains a complete glucose metabolic pathway through the Embden-Meyerhof-Parnas (EMP) system. The ethanol/acetic acid metabolic pathway is only used in low nutrient, low temperature conditions.

Secondary metabolism occurs in bacteria when microbial growth reaches a certain growth phase, typically stationary phase. This is where primary metabolites are sued as precursors to synthesize substances that are not essential for regular activities. These substances are known as secondary metabolites and are encoded for by genes placed in clusters on the genome. H. coagulans L-2 was found to contain four sequences of secondary metabolite codes throughout the genome. These sequences were embedded in T3PKS, bacteriocin, and β-lactam respectively. These annotated sequences were associated with many different functions including spore formation, drug resistance, defense metabolism, protein folding, and more.

== Human health and probiotic qualities ==
Heyndrixia coagulans is a bacteria that can prove beneficial for a variety of health outcomes. This microbe has been found to have potential in preventing cancer with its antipruritic and anti allergenic properties. The strengthening of the intestinal barrier by H. coagulans also serves to treat injuries caused by the alkalizing agent cyclophosphamide (CTX), which is a drug that has been increasingly used to treat cancer. Another beneficial function of this microbe is that it can reduce oxidative stress by enchaining the activity of essential enzymes which maintain the structure and function of cell membranes. Oxidative stress is caused by an overabundance of free radicals in the cells membrane which can disrupt the body's homeostasis. As a gram-positive bacterium containing lipopolysaccharides in the membrane, H. coagulans can act as an activator of the innate immune response. By increasing the production of the enzymes glutathione peroxidase and superoxide dismutase, the microbe can halt peroxidation reactions and restore the cellular membrane. Like many other bacteria, H. coagulans produces essential nutrients including niacin, biotin, vitamin B6, vitamin B12, and folic acid Facultative anaerobes like H. coagulans can increase gut Faecalibacterium prausnitzii abundance in the elderly by depleting oxygen.

== Environmental health ==
In addition to possessing probiotic qualities that improve human health, research has shown H. coagulans can also have positive effects on environmental health. Most notably, H. coagulans can be used to convert some organic wastes to lactic acid, which can then be used in a variety of consumer goods, such as preservatives and cosmetics.

H. coagulans is a thermotolerant bacteria. It is able to use thermotolerant fermentation to successfully convert food waste, like apple and tomato pomaces, into lactic acid. H. coagulans carries out this process by consuming glucose from the food waste and converting it to pyruvate and ATP. The pyruvate is then converted to lactic acid. H. coagulans is able to perform a very high glucose to lactic acid conversion, so very little excess waste is produced. This process provides a way for certain food waste to be reused rather than simply discarded.

== Animal health ==
Similar to its effects in humans, H. coagulans can be added to animal food as a probiotic, particularly for species farmed for commercial animal production. Studies have correlated supplementation of H. coagulans in livestock feed with increased growth, greater immune function, and alleviation of internal toxicity, thus providing higher stock output while decreasing the cost of food.

== Uses ==
H. coagulans was added to the EFSA Qualified Presumption of Safety in 2007 and is still approved as of 2024. H. coagulans is also approved for human and animal consumption as GRAS by the U.S. Food and Drug Administration because H. coagulans does not contain mobile genetic elements. Since the bacterium is not pathogenic in humans or animals, it can be used in food, pharmaceutical, and health care products. In humans, H. coagulans has been seen to regulate symptoms of irritable bowel syndrome, including diarrhea, constipation, and dehydration, promote normal flora particularly in the reproductive system, and balance immune response. When consumed orally, H. coagulans has also been effective in both treating as well as preventing recurrence of Clostridioides difficile associated diarrhea in mice. Further, one animal research study showed that it can alter inflammatory processes in the context of multiple sclerosis. For animals, H. coagulans can be used as a probiotic added to feed pellets, due to the bacterium's resistance to high temperatures. H. coagulans has also been seen to reduce the negative effects of antibiotics on a patient's normal microbiome.

== Marketing ==
H. coagulans is often marketed as Lactobacillus sporogenes or a 'sporeforming lactic acid bacterium' probiotic, but this is an outdated name due to taxonomic changes in 1939. Although H. coagulans does produce L+lactic acid, the bacterium used in these products is not a lactic-acid bacterium, as Bacillaceae species do not belong to the lactic acid bacteria (Lactobacillales). By definition, lactic acid bacteria (Lactobacillus, Bifidobacterium) do not form spores. Therefore, using the name Lactobacillus sporogenes is scientifically incorrect.

The 2023 name H. coagulans is nowhere as common as the former name Bacillus coagulans. The former name remains valid under the Prokaryotic Code.
