= Methylornithine =

Methylornithine may refer to:

- 3-Methylornithine
- N-Methylornithine
