= Methanosarcinales S-layer Tile Protein =

Identifiers
- Symbol: S-layer
- Pfam: PF07752
- InterPro: IPR006457
Available protein structures:
- PDB: IPR006457 PF07752 (ECOD; PDBsum)
- AlphaFold: IPR006457; PF07752

The Methanosarcinales S-layer Tile Protein (MSTP) is a protein family found almost exclusively in Methanomicrobia members of the order Methanosarcinales. Typically a tandem repeat of two DUF1608 domains are contained in a single MSTP protein chain and these proteins self-assemble into the protective proteinaceous surface layer (S-layer) structure that encompasses the cell. The S-layer, which is found in most Archaea, and in many bacteria, serves many crucial functions including protection from deleterious extracellular substances.

== Discovery of the Methanosarcinales S-layer ==
The first S-layers were discovered in bacteria in the 1950s and the presence of S-layers in many Archaea was determined through microscopic (both light and electron) studies of Archaea. The presence of an S-layer in a member of the Methanosarcinales was determined in the 1980s by electron microscope (EM) studies examining the cell morphology of Methanosarcina mazei. This, and other EM studies, confirmed that the cell envelope structure of the Methanosarcinales is composed of a cytoplasmic membrane (CM) with an additional barrier (the S-layer) external to the CM. Under conditions of low osmolarity the S-layer is extensively decorated with a polysaccharide, termed methanochondroitin, and the cells tend to grow in multicellular aggregates. Upon adaptation to high osmolarity conditions the cells disaggregate and grow as single cells that lack the methanochondroitin layer.

== Identification of the Methanosarcinales S-layer Protein ==
The identity of the proteins composing the S-layer of these organisms was subsequently determined by a proteomic approach. The major S-layer proteins of M. acetivorans C2A and M. mazei Gö1 were determined to be MA0829 and MM1976, respectively. Additional proteins with similar characteristics as MA0829 and MM1976 were found to be present in the cell envelopes of these organisms in minor amounts. The genomes of all Methanosarcina species examined thus far have 4-10 paralogous DUF1608 containing proteins. The major and minor S-layer proteins of M. acetivorans C2A and M. mazei Gö1 share many common features including: an N-terminal signal peptide, one or two protein domains of the DUF1608 protein family, a negatively charged tether of ~70 amino acids, and a C-terminal transmembrane helix that likely anchors the S-layer to the CM.

Analysis of protein sequences has determined that members of the DUF1608 protein family contain 250-300 amino acids and are found only in Archaea. With the exception of two halophilic archaea the DUF1608 domain is exclusive to the methanogenic Archaea of the order Methanosarcinales. The DUF1608 has been assigned to the protein family (Pfam), pfam07752.

== Structure ==
The structure of the C-terminal DUF1608 domain of the Methanosarcinales S-layer Tile Protein MA0829. A, the C-terminal DUF1608 domain of MA0829 with domain I colored red, domain II in blue, and the connector subdomain in yellow. B, the crystallographic dimer of the MA0829 CTR. C, a trimer of crystallographic CTR homodimers. Ammonium citrate ligands from the crystallization solution bound at intermolecular interfaces are shown in space filling representation. D, the hexagonal tiles formed from trimeric CTR homodimer assemblies. The primary, asymmetric, and trimer pores are indicated. E, a cutaway side view of the model of the MSTP S-layer (the representation in D is rotated 90° from the viewer). The position of the primary pore is indicated by arrowheads. Adapted from

The structure of one of the two tandem DUF1608 repeats that comprise the major MSTP of M. acetivorans (MA0829) has been determined at high resolution by X-ray crystallography. The structure of the C-terminal DUF1608 tandem repeat (CTR) of MA0829 revealed that the DUF1608 protein domain is composed of two structurally similar β-sandwich domains connected by a short connector subdomain. The β-sandwich domains are structurally similar not only to each other but also to other proteins associated with envelope structures of disparate species including bacterial, fungal, and viral entities.

While the structure of only one of the two DUF1608 domains of the MA0829 protein was determined the structure of the full-length MA0829 tandem DUF1608 repeat protein (minus the N-terminal signal peptide and C-terminal tether and anchor) could be modeled by virtue of the MA0829 CTR forming the same crystallographic dimer in two different crystal forms. The high degree of primary amino acid sequence identity between the N- and C-terminal DUF1608 domains (79% identical and 87% similar) allowed the homology modeling of the N-terminal DUF1608 amino acid sequence onto one of the DUF1608 domains in the crystallographic DUF1608 CTR dimer thus providing the first high-resolution model of an Archaeal S-layer protein.

A model for the quaternary structure of the M. acetivorans S-layer was proposed based on packing of the MA0829 CTR in a hexagonal lattice in one of the two obtained crystal forms (Protein Data Bank accession number 3U2G). The minimal building block of the S-layer sheet is a trimer of crystallographic MA0829 CTR dimers. Lateral translation of the trimeric unit creates a flat 2-dimensional sheet that has features consistent with the molecular properties of hexagonal archaeal S-layers. The overall appearance of the S-layer resembles a honeycomb structure of hexagonal tiles with center to center spacing between the tiles of ~240 Å and a height of ~45 Å.

Three different types of pores are present in the sheet with "Primary pores" situated on the six-fold symmetry axis and "Trimer pores" on the three-fold symmetry axis. Asymmetric pores are located between the adjacent trimeric building blocks. The size of the pores are sufficiently large to allow the exchange of metabolites between the organism and the external environment. Whereas the protein constituents of lipid-based barriers, such as bacterial outer membranes, can be rapidly modified in response to physiological or environmental stimuli, the large pore sizes of the S-layer composed of MSTP protein subunits are presumably required to allow passage of molecules across a protective barrier whose molecular features are difficult to modify. An interesting feature of the model proposed for the M. acetivorans S-layer is the overwhelmingly negative charge of the surfaces of the S-layer including the pores. The S-layer thus presents a substantial size and charge barrier to the free passage of molecules across the S-layer.

The two structures of the MA0829 CTR have been deposited in the Protein Data Bank: 3U2G is the accession code for the selenomethionine-labeled protein in the P622 space group and 3U2H is the accession code for the unlabeled protein structure in the C2 space group.

== Applications ==
S-layers have many potential biotechnology applications. The use of the high-resolution MA0829 structure to facilitate such studies is complicated by difficulties in reconstituting archaeal S-layers in vitro.
