= Methanosarcina mazei =

Scientific classification
- Domain: Archaea
- Kingdom: Methanobacteriati
- Phylum: Methanobacteriota
- Class: "Methanomicrobia"
- Order: Methanosarcinales
- Family: Methanosarcinaceae
- Genus: Methanosarcina
- Species: M. mazei

Binomial name
- Methanosarcina mazei corrig. (Barker 1936) Mah and Kuhn 1984

Species of methanogenic archaea

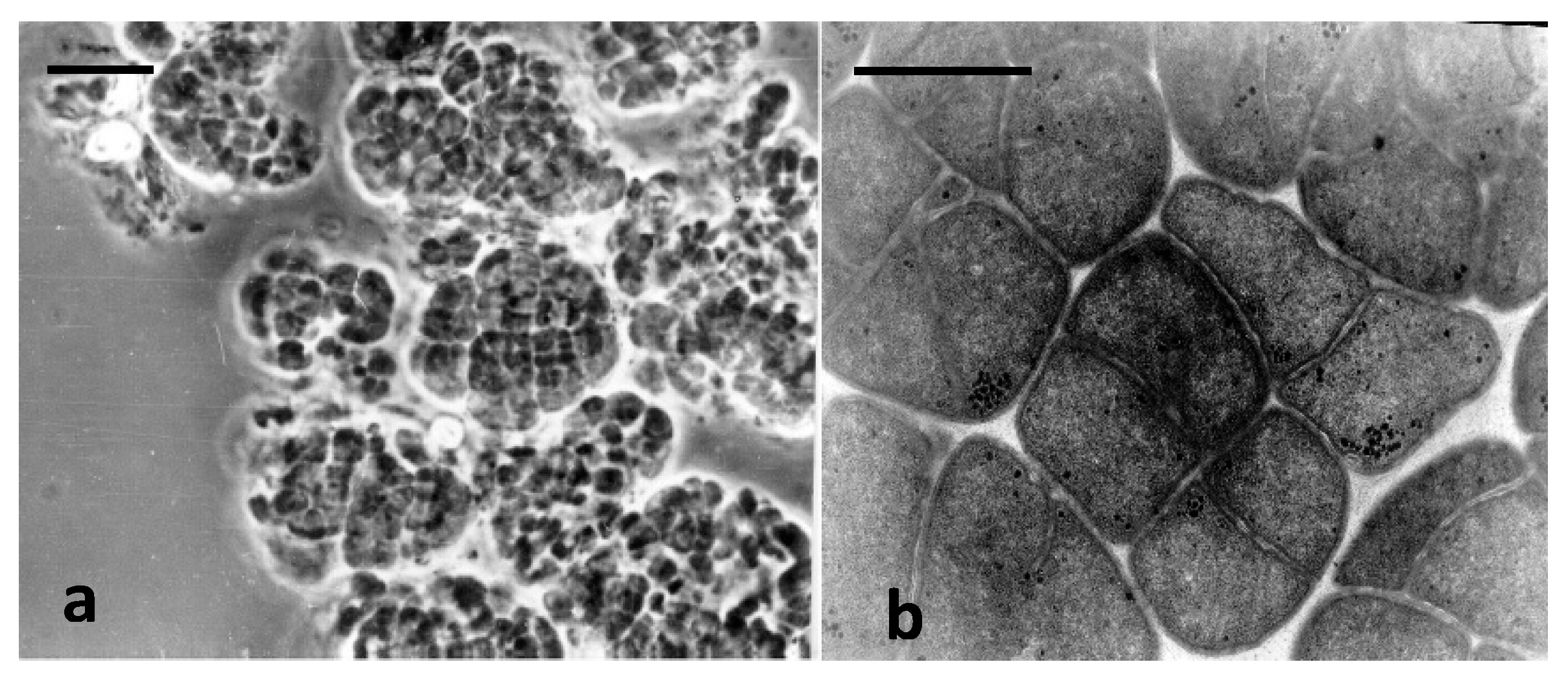
Phase contrast (a) and thin section (b) microscopy images of M. mazei. Image from Oshurkova et al. 2020

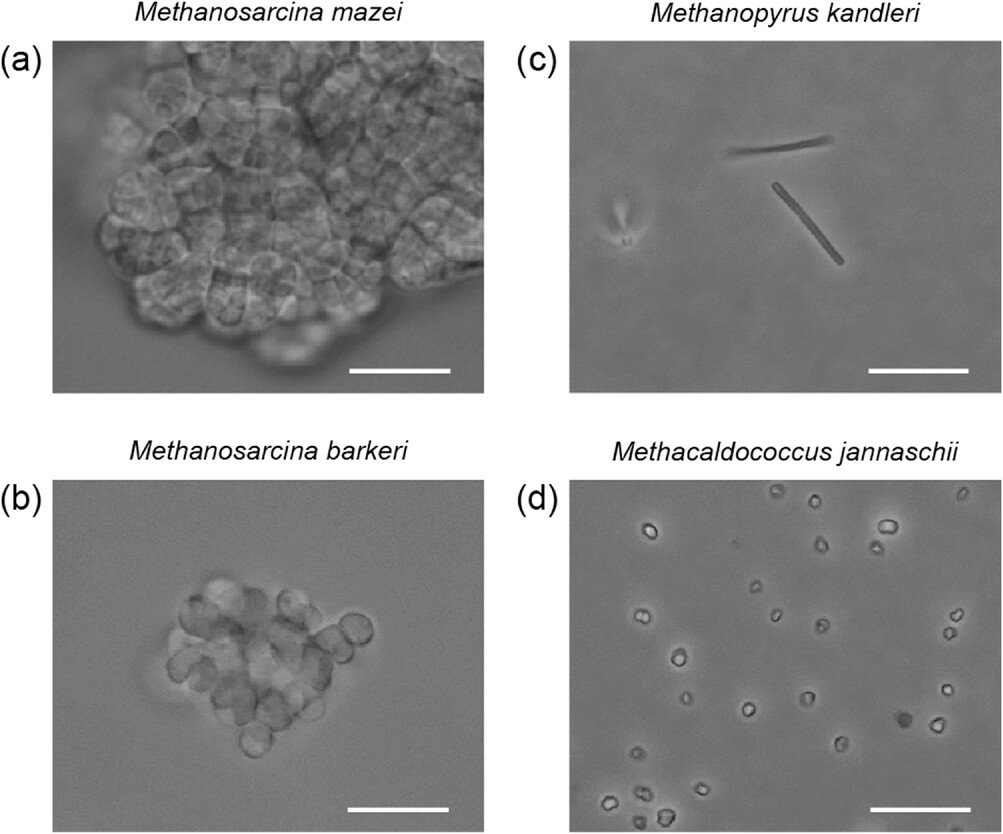
Microscopy image of Methanosarcina mazei JCM9314, Methanopyrus kandleri, Methanosarcina barkeri, and Methanocaldococcus jannaschi. Image from Kanno et al. 2022.

Methanosarcina mazei is a species of the Class II methanogens, part of the (formerly named) Euryarchaeota archaea. It has previously been known as Methanococcus mazei, Methanococcus frisius, and Methanosarcina frisia.

== Discovery ==
M. mazei was first discovered by Mazé in 1915 (described as Pseudosarcina) and first named in 1936 by Albert Barker. M. mazei Gö1, a type-strain, was isolated from a sewage plant in Göttingen, Germany, in 1988 by Friedrich Widdel. M. mazei can be found in fresh water and marine sediments, as well as permafrost.

== Morphology ==
Methanosarcina mazei has coccoid cells around 1–3 microns in diameter that aggregate together with S-layers and a methanochondroitin outer layer in freshwater, and grow as single cells with S-layer coatings in higher salinities. M. mazei can produce an enzyme, disaggregatase, to switch from aggregates to single cells. The S-layer of M. mazei consists primarily of the protein MM1976, which contains five glycosylation sites.

Some strains of M. mazei isolated from Taiwan were found to have pilli and gas vacuoles.

== Genome ==
Methanosarcina mazei's genome consists of a single circular chromosome of around 4.1 Mbp with 3371 protein encoding genes. It uses a single origin of replication, has an average intergenic region of 303 bp, a coding region of 75.15%, and a GC content around 41%. M. mazei is closely related phylogenetically to Methanosarcina acetivorans and Methanosarcina barkeri, with M. mazei most closely resembling the predicted ancestral genome of the three species. Two complete chemotaxis gene sets are present, likely at least partially to support biofilm formation.

M. mazei has long 5' (up to 500 nucleotide) untranslated regions in many of its transcripts, which is not standard for many archaea. Antisense sRNAs are used across the genome for regulation, including for nitrogen regulation and likely for transposon mobility.

Based on DNA sequences, M. mazei uses archaeal DNA replication, transcription, and translation systems but its DNA repair systems are more similar to bacterial systems. M. mazei expresses thermosome enzymes (group II chaperonins) as well group I chaperonins, likely one of many examples of horizontal gene transfer from bacteria. Genes suspected to have been gained from horizontal gene transfer appear scattered throughout the genome, suggesting M. mazei has accepted genes from many hosts.

== Growth Requirements and Metabolism ==
M. mazei grows between 8 and 45 °C, with an optimal temperature of 40 °C. Its optimum pH is 7.2 but can tolerate pHs between 5.5 and 8.5. It can grow in salt contents up to 800 mM Na^{+}, ammonium concentrations of 3 g/L, and volatile fatty acid concentrations up to 10 g/L. To respond to salinity stress, M. mazei can produce N-acetyl-β-lysine and transport glycine-betaine.

ATP synthesis is driven by hydrogen ions using an A_{1}A_{0} ATPase and an F_{420}H_{2} dehydrogenase.

M. mazei can utilize a variety of carbon sources for methanogenesis, including CO_{2}, acetate, methanol, and methylamines. It can reduce Fe(III) in ferrihydrite to fuel methylotrophic methanogenesis and produce vivianite. M. mazei can receive electrons from Geobacter species through direct interspecies electron transfer (DIET). It does not require a multiheme cytochrome to participate in DIET.

== Biotechnology Applications ==
M. mazei offers potential as a source of bioplastic production, pollutant degradation, and heavy metal bioremediation. Its tolerance for organic acids, ammonia, and salinity could make it a useful production microbe, and many tools to engineer it have been created, including CRISPR, inducible promoters, and the use of pyrrolysyl-tRNA synthetases for codon expansion.
