= C6H14N2O2 =

The molecular formula C_{6}H_{14}N_{2}O_{2} (molar mass: 146.19 g/mol) may refer to:

- Lysine
- β-Lysine
- Meldonium
- 3-Methylornithine
- N-Methylornithine
