= Weizmannia =

Scientific classification
- Domain: Bacteria
- Kingdom: Bacillati
- Phylum: Bacillota
- Class: Bacilli
- Order: Caryophanales
- Family: Bacillaceae
- Genus: Weizmannia; Gupta et al. 2020

Type species
- Weizmannia coagulans (Hammer 1915) Gupta et al. 2020

Species
- W. acidilactici; W. acidiproducens; W. agrestimuris; W. coagulans; W. faecalis; W. ginsengihumi

Genus of bacteria

Weizmannia is a genus of Gram-Positive rod-shaped bacteria in the family Bacillaceae from the order Bacillales. The type species of this genus is Weizmannia coagulans.

Members of Weizmannia are previously species belonging to Bacillus, a genus that has been recognized as displaying extensive polyphyly and phylogenetic heterogeneity due to the vague criteria (such as the ability to form endospores in the presence of oxygen) previously used to assign species to this clade. Multiple studies using comparative phylogenetic analyses have been published in an attempt to clarify the evolutionary relationships between Bacillus species, resulting in the establishment of numerous novel genera such as Alkalihalobacillus, Brevibacillus, Solibacillus, Alicyclobacillus, Virgibacillus and Evansella. In addition, the genus Bacillus has been restricted to only include species closely related to Bacillus subtilis and Bacillus cereus.

The name Weizmannia was named in honour of Dr. Chaim Weizmann (1874–1952), a noted biochemist, who later became the first President of the State of Israel, for his pioneering work in the field of industrial fermentation and microbiology.

== Biochemical Characteristics and Molecular Signatures ==
Members of this genus are aerobic or facultatively anaerobic and found in mainly in soil. All members can produce endospores and are motile (with the exception of Weizmannia ginsengihumi). Weizmannia coagulans has many industrial applications, such as the coagulation of canned milk and flat-souring of other carbohydrate-containing canned foods and the production of lactic acid and various enzymes. It is found in many sources other than soil (canned foods, tomato juice, gelatin, milk, medical preparations and silage).Weizmannia can grow in temperatures ranging from 10°C to 45°C but the optimal growth temperature is in the range of 25-37°C.

Analyses of genome sequences from Weizmannia species identified two conserved signature indels (CSIs) that are exclusively shared by all members of this genus in the proteins acetate kinase and O-methyltransferase. These CSIs provide a reliable molecular means of distinguishing Weizmannia species from other Bacillaceae genera and bacteria.

== Taxonomy ==
Weizmannia, as of May 2021, contains a total of 3 species with validly published names. This genus was identified as a monophyletic clade and phylogenetically unrelated to other Bacillus species in studies examining the taxonomic relationships within Bacillus. This branching pattern is also observed in the Genome Taxonomy Database (GTDB).

In July 2023, an article in the IJSEM argued that this genus, along with Bacillus acidicola, Bacillus pervagus, and Margalitia should all be subsumed under Heyndrickxia. Being a taxonomic opinion in the IJSEM, the new combination names are considered valid. GTDB release R214 does not yet include this "lumping" change.

== Phylogeny ==
16S rRNA based LTP_10_2024

- Weizmannia ginsengihumi

- Weizmannia
  - W. agrestimuris Afrizal et al. 2024
  - - W. acidiproducens
    - - W. coagulans
      - W. faecalis

120 marker proteins based GTDB 09-RS220

- Weizmannia
  - W. ginsengihumi (Ten et al. 2007) Gupta et al. 2020
  - - W. acidiproducens (Jung, Kim & Chang 2009) Gupta et al. 2020
    - - W. acidilactici Tolieng et al. 2023
      - - W. coagulans (Hammer 1915) Gupta et al. 2020
        - W. faecalis Kieu et al. 2023
