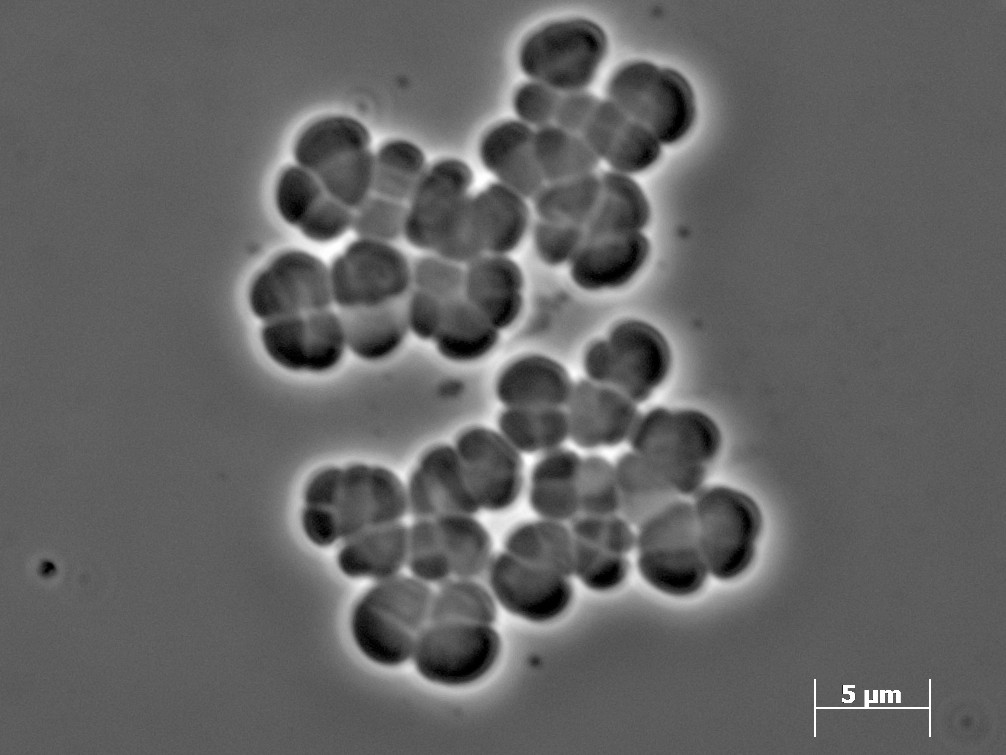
- Phase-contrast photo of Methanosarcina barkeri, type strain MS^{T}

Scientific classification
- Domain: Archaea
- Kingdom: Methanobacteriati
- Phylum: Methanobacteriota
- Class: "Methanomicrobia"
- Order: Methanosarcinales
- Family: Methanosarcinaceae
- Genus: Methanosarcina; Kluyver and van Niel 1936

Type species
- Methanosarcina barkeri Schnellen 1947

Species
- See text

Synonyms
- Sarcina ("Methanosarcina") (Kluyver & van Niel 1936) Breed 1948

= Methanosarcina =

Genus of archaea

Methanosarcina is a genus of euryarchaeote archaea that produce methane. These single-celled organisms are known as anaerobic methanogens that produce methane using all three metabolic pathways for methanogenesis. They live in diverse environments where they can remain safe from the effects of oxygen, whether on the earth's surface, in groundwater, in deep sea vents, and in animal digestive tracts. Methanosarcina grow in colonies.

The amino acid pyrrolysine was first discovered in a Methanosarcina species, M. barkeri. Primitive versions of hemoglobin have been found in M. acetivorans, suggesting the microbe or an ancestor of it may have played a crucial role in the evolution of life on Earth. Species of Methanosarcina are also noted for unusually large genomes. M. acetivorans has the largest known genome of any archaeon.

According to a theory published in 2014, Methanosarcina may have been largely responsible for the largest extinction event in the Earth's history, the Permian–Triassic extinction event. The theory suggests that acquisition of a new metabolic pathway via gene transfer followed by exponential reproduction allowed the microbe to rapidly consume vast deposits of organic carbon in marine sediments, leading to a sharp buildup of methane and carbon dioxide in the Earth's oceans and atmosphere that killed around 80% of the world's species. This theory could better explain the observed carbon isotope level in period deposits than other theories such as volcanic activity.

Methanosarcina has been used in waste water treatment since the mid-1980s. Researchers have sought ways to use it as an alternative power source. Methanosarcina strains were grown in single-cell morphology (Sowers et al. 1993) at 35 °C (95 °F) in HS broth medium containing 125 mM methanol plus 40 mM sodium acetate (HS-MA medium).

== Overview ==
Methanosarcina may be the only known anaerobic methanogens that produce methane using all three known metabolic pathways for methanogenesis. Methanogenesis is critical to the waste-treatment industry and biologically produced methane also represents an important alternative fuel source. Most methanogens make methane from carbon dioxide and hydrogen gas. Others utilize acetate in the acetoclastic pathway. In addition to these two pathways, species of Methanosarcina can also metabolize methylated one-carbon compounds through methylotrophic methanogenesis. Such one-carbon compounds include methylamines, methanol, and methyl thiols. Only Methanosarcina species possess all three known pathways for methanogenesis, and are capable of utilizing no less than nine methanogenic substrates, including acetate.

Methanosarcina are the world's most diverse methanogens in terms of ecology. They are found in environments such as landfills, sewage heaps, deep sea vents, deep subsurface groundwater, and even in the gut of many different ungulates, including cows, sheep, goats, and deer. Methanosarcina have also been found in the human digestive tract. M. barkeri can withstand extreme temperature fluctuations and go without water for extended periods. It can consume a variety of compounds or survive solely on hydrogen and carbon dioxide. It can also survive in low pH environments that are typically hazardous for life. Noting its extreme versatility, biologist Kevin Sowers postulated that M. barkeri could even survive on Mars. Methanosarcina grow in colonies and show primitive cellular differentiation.

In 2002, the amino acid pyrrolysine was discovered in M. barkeri by Ohio State University researchers. Earlier research by the team had shown that a gene in M. barkeri had an in-frame amber (UAG) codon that did not signal the end of a protein, as would normally be expected. This behavior suggested the possibility of an unknown amino acid which was confirmed over several years by slicing the protein into peptides and sequencing them. Pyrrolysine was the first genetically encoded amino acid discovered since 1986, and 22nd overall. It has subsequently been found throughout the family Methanosarcinaceae as well as in a single bacterium, Desulfitobacterium hafniense.

Both M. acetivorans and M. mazei have exceptionally large genomes. As of August 2008, M. acetivorans possessed the largest sequenced archaeal genome with 5,751,492 base pairs. The genome of M. mazei has 4,096,345 base pairs.

Methanosarcina cell membranes are made of relatively short lipids, primarily of C25 hydrocarbons and C20 ethers. The majority of other methanogens have C30 hydrocarbons and a mixture of C20 and C40 ethers.

== Phylogeny ==
The currently accepted taxonomy is based on the List of Prokaryotic names with Standing in Nomenclature (LPSN) and National Center for Biotechnology Information (NCBI).

16S rRNA based LTP_07_2026

- Methanosarcina
  - - M. baltica von Klein et al. 2002
    - - M. sediminis Zhou et al. 2026
      - M. semesiae Lyimo et al. 2000
  - - M. lacustris Simankova et al. 2002
    - - "M. baikalica" Zhilina et al. 2025
      - - M. subterranea Shimizu et al. 2015
        - - - M. horonobensis Shimizu et al. 2011
            - - M. mazei corrig. (Barker 1936) Mah & Kuhn 1986
              - M. soligelidi Wagner et al. 2013
          - - - M. acetivorans Sowers, Baron & Ferry 1986
              - - M. mangrovi Zhou et al. 2026
                - M. siciliae (Stetter & K nig 1989) Ni et al. 1994
            - - - M. flavescens Kern et al. 2016
                - M. thermophila Zinder et al. 1985
              - - M. barkeri Schnellen 1947
                - - M. spelaei Ganzert et al. 2014
                  - M. vacuolata Zhilina & Zavarzin 1987

53 marker proteins based GTDB 11-RS232

- Methanosarcina
  - - M. lacustris
    - - - M. acetivorans
        - M. siciliae
      - - M. horonobensis
        - - "M. hadiensis" Giménez et al. 2024
          - M. mazei (incl. M. soligelidi)
  - - "M. baikalica"
    - - - M. flavescens
        - M. thermophila
      - - M. spelaei
        - - M. barkeri
          - M. vacuolata

Species incertae sedis:

- "Methanosarcina calensis" Blotevogel et al.
- Methanosarcina methanica (Smit 1930) Kluyver & van Niel 1936

== Role in early development of life on Earth ==
In 2004, two primitive versions of hemoglobin were discovered in M. acetivorans and another archaeon, Aeropyrum pernix. Known as protoglobins, these globins bind with oxygen much as hemoglobin does. In M. acetivorans, this allows for the removal of unwanted oxygen which would otherwise be toxic to this anaerobic organism. Protoglobins thus may have created a path for the evolution of later lifeforms which are dependent on oxygen. Following the Great Oxygenation Event, once there was free oxygen in Earth's atmosphere, the ability to process oxygen led to widespread radiation of life, and is one of the most fundamental stages in the evolution of Earth's lifeforms.

Inspired by M. acetivorans, a team of Penn State researchers led by James G. Ferry and Christopher House proposed a new "thermodynamical theory of evolution" in 2006. It was observed that M. acetivorans converts carbon monoxide into acetate, the scientists hypothesized that early "proto-cells" attached to mineral could have similarly used primitive enzymes to generate energy while excreting acetate. The theory thus sought to unify the "heterotrophic" theory of early evolution, where the primordial soup of simple molecules arose from non-biological processes, and the "chemoautotrophic" theory, where the earliest lifeforms created most simple molecules. The authors observed that though the "debate between the heterotrophic and chemotrophic theories revolved around carbon fixation", in actuality "these pathways evolved first to make energy. Afterwards, they evolved to fix carbon." The scientists further proposed mechanisms which would have allowed the mineral-bound proto-cell to become free-living and for the evolution of acetate metabolism into methane, using the same energy-based pathways. They speculated that M. acetivorans was one of the first lifeforms on Earth, a direct descendant of the early proto-cells. The research was published in Molecular Biology and Evolution in June 2006.

Recently researchers have proposed an evolution hypothesis for acetate kinase and phosphoacetyl transferase with genomic evidence from Methanosarcina. Scientists hypothesize acetate kinase could be the urokinase in a major protein superfamily that includes actin. Evidence suggests acetate kinase evolved in an ancient halophilic Methanosarcina genome through duplication and divergence of the acetyl coA synthetase gene.

== Role in the Permian–Triassic extinction event ==
It was hypothesized that Methanosarcina's methane production may have been one of the causes of the Permian–Triassic extinction event. It is estimated that 70% of shell creatures died from ocean acidification, due to over-populated Methanosarcina. A study conducted by Chinese and American researchers supports that hypothesis. Using genetic analysis of about 50 Methanosarcina genomes, the team concluded that the microbe likely acquired the ability to efficiently consume acetate using acetate kinase and phosphoacetyl transferase roughly 240 ± 41 million years ago, (Note: This value is the estimated date of the last common ancestor of those Methanosarcina strains able to grow readily on acetate.) about the time of the extinction event 252 million years ago. The genes for these enzymes may have been acquired from a cellulose-degrading bacterium via gene transfer. Gene transfer plays an important role in the adaption of Methanosarcina species to their respective environment, with genomes of some species containing up to 31% of genes acquired via gene transfer such as Methanosarcina mazei.

The scientists concluded that these new genes, combined with widely available organic carbon deposits in the ocean and a plentiful supply of nickel, (Note: A nickel-tetrapyrrole coenzyme, cofactor F430, is present in methyl coenzyme M reductase, which catalyzes the final step in the release of methane by methanogens.) allowed Methanosarcina populations to increase dramatically. Under their theory, this led to the release of abundant methane as waste. Then, some of the methane would have been broken down into carbon dioxide by other organisms. The buildup of these two gases would have caused oxygen levels in the ocean to decrease dramatically, while also increasing acidity. Terrestrial climates would simultaneously have experienced rising temperatures and significant climate change from the release of these greenhouse gases into the atmosphere. It is possible the buildup of carbon dioxide and methane in the atmosphere eventually caused the release of hydrogen sulfide gas, further stressing terrestrial life. The team's findings were published in the Proceedings of the National Academy of Sciences in March 2014.

The microbe theory's proponents argue that it would better explain the rapid, but continual, rise of carbon isotope level in period sediment deposits than volcanic eruption, which causes a spike in carbon levels followed by a slow decline. The microbe theory suggests that volcanic activity played a different role - supplying the nickel which Methanosarcina required as a cofactor. Thus, the microbe theory holds that Siberian volcanic activity was a catalyst for, but not the primary cause of the mass extinction.

== Use by humans ==
In 1985, Shimizu Construction developed a bioreactor that uses Methanosarcina to treat waste water from food processing plants and paper mills. The water is fed into the reactor where the microbes break down the waste particulate. The methane produced by the archaea is then used to power the reactor, making it cheap to run. In tests, Methanosarcina reduced the waste concentration from 5,000 to 10,000 parts per million (ppm) to 80–100 ppm. Further treatment was necessary to finish the cleansing process. According to a 1994 report in Chemistry and Industry, bioreactors utilizing anaerobic digestion by Methanothrix soehngenii or Methanosarcina produced less sludge byproduct than aerobic counterparts. Methanosarcina reactors operate at temperatures ranging from 35 to 55 °C and pH ranges of 6.5–7.5.

Researchers have sought ways to utilize Methanosarcina's methane-producing abilities more broadly as an alternative power source. In December 2010, University of Arkansas researchers successfully spliced a gene into M. acetivorans that allowed it to break down esters. They argued that this would allow it to more efficiently convert biomass into methane gas for power production. In 2011, it was shown that most methane produced during decomposition at landfills comes from M. barkeri. The researchers found that the microbe can survive in low pH environments and that it consumes acid, thereby raising the pH and allowing a wider range of life to flourish. They argued that their findings could help accelerate research into using archaea-generated methane as an alternate power source.

== See also ==
- List of Archaea genera
