= XSC =

XSC may refer to:

- Excitonic solar cell
- Sulfoacetaldehyde acetyltransferase, an enzyme
- South Caicos Airport
- Extensions for Scientific Computation, an extension for interval arithmetics
