= Heyndrickxia =

Scientific classification
- Domain: Bacteria
- Kingdom: Bacillati
- Phylum: Bacillota
- Class: Bacilli
- Order: Bacillales
- Family: Heyndrickxiaceae
- Genus: Heyndrickxia; Gupta et al. 2020

Type species
- Heyndrickxia oleronia (Kuhnigk et al. 1996) Gupta et al. 2020

Species
- H. acidicola; H. oleronia; H. sporothermodurans; H. vini

Genus of bacteria

Heyndrickxia is a genus of gram-positive rod-shaped bacteria (except for Heyndrickxia sporothermodurans, which stains gram-negative) in the family Bacillaceae within the order Bacillales. The type species for this genus is Heyndrickxia oleronia.

Members of Heyndrickxia were originally assigned to the genus Bacillus. The polyphyletic nature and unclear evolutionary relationships of the genus Bacillus has long been a topic in the scientific community. It was composed of many unrelated species with a diverse range of biochemical characteristics due to the vague criteria (such as the ability to form endospores under aerobic conditions) used to assign species to this genus. Multiple phylogenetic studies and comparative genomic analyses have been conducted to clarify the taxonomy of genus, resulting in the restriction of Bacillus to only include species closely related to Bacillus subtilis and Bacillus cereus, and the establishment of many novel genera such as Virgibacillus, Solibacillus, Brevibacillus and Ectobacillus.

The name Heyndrickxia was chosen to celebrate Professor Marc Heyndrickx (University of Gent) for his contributions to the field of microbiology and his research on Bacillus species.

== Biochemical characteristics and molecular signatures ==
Members of the genus Heyndrickxia are aerobic, endospore-forming bacteria. Most species are motile and generally catalase- and oxidase-positive. The main isolation source for this genus is in dairy or dairy production facilities, such as in raw milk and feed concentrate for cattle. Heyndrickxia can survive in temperatures ranging from 20 to 55 °C (68 to 131 °F), but optimal growth occurs in the range of 30–45 °C (86–113 °F).

Five conserved signature indels (CSIs) have been identified as exclusive for this genus in the proteins stage V sporulation protein D, N-acetyl-gamma-glutamyl-phosphate reductase, type II/IV secretion system protein, homoserine O-succinyltransferase and septation ring formation regulator EzrA which can be used as reliable distinguishing molecular signatures to demarcate Heyndrickxia species from other Bacillaceae genera and bacteria.

== Taxonomy ==
As of May 2021, there are a total of 3 species with validly published names in the genus Heyndrickxia. Members of this genus form a monophyletic branch in various phylogenetic trees created based on concatenated sequences from various datasets of conserved proteins and 16S rRNA genome sequences. The monophyletic nature of this genus is also found in the Genome Taxonomy Database.

Additionally, the non-validly published species "Bacillus obstructivis" also branches with members of Heyndrickxia as well as share the unique molecular markers specific for the genus. However, transfer of this species into the clade was not proposed due to the lack of culture strain information. This indicates the need to perform periodic analysis of the classification of this genus when more genome sequence and culture stain information becomes available.

In July 2023, an article in the IJSEM argued Bacillus acidicola, Bacillus pervagus, Margalitia, and Weizmannia should all be subsumed under Heyndrickxia. Being a taxonomic opinion in the IJSEM, the new combination names are considered valid. GTDB release R214 does not yet include this "lumping" change.

== Phylogeny ==
16S rRNA based LTP_10_2024

- - - Margalitia shackletonii
    - Weizmannia ginsengihumi
  - - Heyndrickxia
      - H. camelliae (Niu et al. 2018) Narsing-Rao et al. 2023
      - - H. acidicola (Albert et al. 2005) Narsing-Rao et al. 2023
        - - Oikeobacillus pervagus (Kosowski et al. 2014) Narsing Rao et al. 2023
          - - H. oleronia (Kuhnigk et al. 1996) Gupta et al. 2020
            - - H. sporothermodurans (Pettersson et al. 1996) Gupta et al. 2020
              - H. vini (Ma et al. 2017) Gupta et al. 2020

120 marker proteins based GTDB 09-RS220

- - Weizmannia
  - - Heyndrickxia acidicola
    - - Margalitia
        - M. camelliae (Niu et al. 2018) Gupta et al. 2020
        - M. shackletonii
      - Heyndrickxia
        - H. oleronia
        - - H. sporothermodurans
          - H. vini
