= Acetate kinase (diphosphate) =

Class of enzymes

Identifiers
- EC no.: 2.7.2.12
- CAS no.: 57657-58-6

Databases
- IntEnz: IntEnz view
- BRENDA: BRENDA entry
- ExPASy: NiceZyme view
- KEGG: KEGG entry
- MetaCyc: metabolic pathway
- PRIAM: profile
- PDB structures: RCSB PDB PDBe PDBsum
- Gene Ontology: AmiGO / QuickGO
Search
- PMC: articles
- PubMed: articles
- NCBI: proteins

Acetate kinase (diphosphate) (EC 2.7.2.12) is an enzyme that catalyzes the chemical reaction

PP_{i} +
acetic acid
P_{i} +
acetyl phosphate

The enzyme characterised from the amoebozoa, Entamoeba histolytica, converts acetic acid to acetyl phosphate by transferring a phosphate group from pyrophosphoric acid, (PP_{i}). Inorganic phosphate (P_{i}) is the byproduct.

This enzyme is a transferase, specifically one transferring phosphorus-containing groups (phosphotransferases) with a carboxy group as acceptor. The systematic name of this enzyme class is diphosphate:acetate phosphotransferase. This enzyme is also called pyrophosphate-acetate phosphotransferase.
