= Trideuteromethane =

Names
- Preferred IUPAC name (^{2}H_{3})methane
- Other names Trideuterated methane Trideuteriomethane; Methane-d3; Deuterioform

Identifiers
CAS Number	676-80-2
3D model (JSmol)	Interactive image
ChemSpider	9129015
ECHA InfoCard	100.221.447
EC Number	693-079-1
PubChem CID	10953798
CompTox Dashboard (EPA)	DTXSID80449539
- InChI: InChI=1S/CH4/h1H4/i1D3 Key: VNWKTOKETHGBQD-FIBGUPNXSA-N
- SMILES: [2H]C([2H])[2H]

Properties
Chemical formula	CHD_{3}
Molar mass	19.061 g·mol^{-1}
Melting point	−183 °C (−297.4 °F; 90.1 K)
Boiling point	−163 °C (−261 °F; 110 K) at 760 mmHg (101 kPa)

Hazards
- GHS labelling
Pictograms	(GHS02: Flammable) (GHS04: Compressed Gas)
Signal word	Danger
Hazard statements	H220, H280
Precautionary statements	P203, P210, P222, P280, P377, P381, P403, P410+P403
- Except where otherwise noted, data are given for materials in their standard state (at 25 °C [77 °F], 100 kPa). Infobox references

Trideuteromethane or deuterioform (CHD_{3}) is an isotopologue of methane (CH_{4}).

== Biological formation ==
Biological formation of trideuteromethane has been demonstrated in cultures of Methanosarcina barkeri grown on trimethylamine, methylamine, or methanol containing deuterated methyl groups. Mass spectrometric analysis showed that it accounted for approximately 79–83% of the methane produced, supporting the role of methyl groups in these substrates as direct precursors of methane.
