= Methylornithine synthase =

Identifiers
- EC no.: 5.4.99.58

Databases
- IntEnz: IntEnz view
- BRENDA: BRENDA entry
- ExPASy: NiceZyme view
- KEGG: KEGG entry
- MetaCyc: metabolic pathway
- PRIAM: profile
- PDB structures: RCSB PDB PDBe PDBsum
Search
- PMC: articles
- PubMed: articles
- NCBI: proteins

Methylornithine synthase (EC 5.4.99.58, PylB) is an enzyme with systematic name L-lysine carboxy-aminomethylmutase. This enzyme catalyses the conversion of L-lysine into (3R)-3-methyl-D-ornithine.

The enzyme is a member of the superfamily of S-adenosyl-L-methionine-dependent radical enzymes.
