= Sulfoacetaldehyde acetyltransferase =

Class of enzymes

sulfoacetaldehyde acetyltransferase

Identifiers
- EC no.: 2.3.3.15

Databases
- IntEnz: IntEnz view
- BRENDA: BRENDA entry
- ExPASy: NiceZyme view
- KEGG: KEGG entry
- MetaCyc: metabolic pathway
- PRIAM: profile
- PDB structures: RCSB PDB PDBe PDBsum
- Gene Ontology: AmiGO / QuickGO
Search
- PMC: articles
- PubMed: articles
- NCBI: proteins

In enzymology, a sulfoacetaldehyde acetyltransferase (EC 2.3.3.15) is an enzyme that catalyzes the chemical reaction

acetyl phosphate + sulfite $\rightleftharpoons$ 2-sulfoacetaldehyde + phosphate

Thus, the two substrates of this enzyme are acetyl phosphate and sulfite, whereas its two products are 2-sulfoacetaldehyde and phosphate.

This enzyme belongs to the family of transferases, specifically those acyltransferases that convert acyl groups into alkyl groups on transfer. The systematic name of this enzyme class is acetyl-phosphate:sulfite S-acetyltransferase (acyl-phosphate hydrolysing, 2-oxoethyl-forming). This enzyme is also called Xsc. This enzyme participates in taurine and hypotaurine metabolism.
