= Heyndrickxia oleronia =

Scientific classification
- Domain: Bacteria
- Kingdom: Bacillati
- Phylum: Bacillota
- Class: Bacilli
- Order: Caryophanales
- Family: Bacillaceae
- Genus: Bacillus
- Species: B. oleronius

Binomial name
- Bacillus oleronius Kuhnigk et al. 1996

Species of bacterium

Bacillus oleronius is a Gram-negative bacterium belonging to the genus Bacillus. However, Bacillus oleronius has Gram-positive cell wall components shared among all bacillus species (Lacey N, 2007). It was first described in 1995 and was found in the hindgut of the termite Reticulitermes flavipes. It is also found in the human skin parasitic mite Demodex folliculorum, and may be related to the development of a type of rosacea.

This species has been recently transferred into the genus Heyndrickxia. The correct nomenclature is Heyndrickxia oleronia.

== See also ==
- Bacillus marinus
- Bacillus lentimorbus
