= Bacillus sporothermodurans =

Scientific classification
- Domain: Bacteria
- Kingdom: Bacillati
- Phylum: Bacillota
- Class: Bacilli
- Order: Bacillales
- Family: Bacillaceae
- Genus: Bacillus
- Species: B. sporothermodurans

Binomial name
- Bacillus sporothermodurans Pettersson et al., 1996

Species of bacterium

Bacillus sporothermodurans is a species of bacteria notable for producing highly heat-resistant endospores, hence its name. It is strictly aerobic. Its type strain is M215 (DSMZ 10599).

This species has been recently transferred into the genus Heyndrickxia. The correct nomenclature is Heyndrickxia sporothermodurans.
