= PYLIS downstream sequence =

Structure on some mRNA sequences

Pyrrolysine insertion sequence 1 (mtmB)
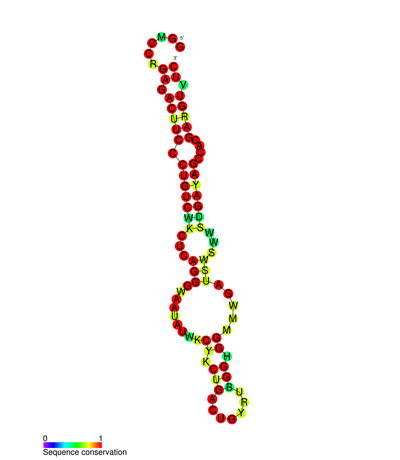
- Predicted secondary structure of PYLIS 1 RNA.

Identifiers
- Symbol: PYLIS_1
- Rfam: RF01982

Other data
- RNA type: Presumed cis-regulatory element
- Domain(s): Archaea and Bacteria
- PDB structures: PDBe

Pyrrolysine insertion sequence mtbB

Identifiers
- Symbol: PYLIS_2
- Rfam: RF02509

Other data
- PDB structures: PDBe

Pyrrolysine insertion sequence mttB

Identifiers
- Symbol: PYLIS_3
- Rfam: RF02510

Other data
- PDB structures: PDBe

Pyrrolysine insertion sequence TetR

Identifiers
- Symbol: PYLIS_4
- Rfam: RF02511

Other data
- PDB structures: PDBe

Pyrrolysine insertion sequence transposase 1

Identifiers
- Symbol: PYLIS_5
- Rfam: RF02512

Other data
- PDB structures: PDBe

Pyrrolysine insertion sequence transposase 2

Identifiers
- Symbol: PYLIS_6
- Rfam: RF02513

Other data
- PDB structures: PDBe

In biology, the PYLIS downstream sequence (PYLIS: pyrrolysine insertion sequence) is a stem-loop structure that appears on some mRNA sequences. This structural motif was previously thought to cause the UAG (amber) stop codon to be translated to the amino acid pyrrolysine instead of ending the protein translation. However, it has been shown that PYLIS has no effect upon the efficiency of the UAG suppression, hence even its name is, in fact, incorrect.

== See also ==
- SECIS element
