= Pyrrolysine—tRNAPyl ligase =

Enzyme catalyst

Pyrrolysine—tRNA^{Pyl} ligase

Identifiers
- EC no.: 6.1.1.26

Databases
- IntEnz: IntEnz view
- BRENDA: BRENDA entry
- ExPASy: NiceZyme view
- KEGG: KEGG entry
- MetaCyc: metabolic pathway
- PRIAM: profile
- PDB structures: RCSB PDB PDBe PDBsum
Search
- PMC: articles
- PubMed: articles
- NCBI: proteins

Pyrrolysine—tRNA^{Pyl} ligase (EC 6.1.1.26, PylS, pyrrolysyl-tRNA synthetase) is an enzyme with systematic name L-pyrrolysine:tRNAPyl ligase (AMP-forming). This enzyme catalyses the following chemical reaction

ATP + L-pyrrolysine + tRNAPyl $\rightleftharpoons$ AMP + diphosphate + L-pyrrolysyl-tRNAPyl

This enzyme is specific for pyrrolysine as substrate as it cannot be replaced by lysine or any of the other natural amino acids.
