= Trimethylamine-corrinoid protein Co-methyltransferase =

Identifiers
- EC no.: 2.1.1.250

Databases
- IntEnz: IntEnz view
- BRENDA: BRENDA entry
- ExPASy: NiceZyme view
- KEGG: KEGG entry
- MetaCyc: metabolic pathway
- PRIAM: profile
- PDB structures: RCSB PDB PDBe PDBsum
Search
- PMC: articles
- PubMed: articles
- NCBI: proteins

Trimethylamine-corrinoid protein Co-methyltransferase (EC 2.1.1.250, mttB (gene), trimethylamine methyltransferase) is an enzyme with systematic name trimethylamine:5-hydroxybenzimidazolylcobamide Co-methyltransferase. This enzyme catalyses the following chemical reaction

trimethylamine + [Co(I) trimethylamine-specific corrinoid protein] $\rightleftharpoons$ [methyl-Co(III) trimethylamine-specific corrinoid protein] + dimethylamine

This enzyme is involved in methanogenesis from trimethylamine.
