= Margalitia camelliae =

Scientific classification
- Domain: Bacteria
- Kingdom: Bacillati
- Phylum: Bacillota
- Class: Bacilli
- Order: Bacillales
- Family: Bacillaceae
- Genus: Margalitia
- Species: M. camelliae

Binomial name
- Margalitia camelliae (Niu et al. 2018) Gupta et al. 2020

Type strain
- 7578-1

Synonyms
- Bacillus camelliae

Species of bacterium

Margalitia camelliae is a Gram-positive, aerobic and rod-shaped bacterium from the genus of Margalitia which has been isolated from Pu'er tea. 1
