= Margalitia =

Scientific classification
- Domain: Bacteria
- Kingdom: Bacillati
- Phylum: Bacillota
- Class: Bacilli
- Order: Caryophanales
- Family: Bacillaceae
- Genus: Margalitia; Gupta et al. 2020

Type species
- M. shackletonii (Logan et al. 2004) Gupta et al. 2020

Species
- M. camelliae; M. shackletonii

Genus of bacteria

Margalitia is a genus of gram-positive or gram-variable rod-shaped bacteria in the family Bacillaceae from the order Bacillales. The type species of this genus is Margalitia shackletonii.

Members of Margalitia are previously species belonging to Bacillus, a genus that has been recognized as displaying extensive polyphyly and phylogenetic heterogeneity due to the vague criteria (such as the ability to form endospores in the presence of oxygen) previously used to assign species to this clade. Multiple studies using comparative phylogenetic analyses have been published in an attempt to clarify the evolutionary relationships between Bacillus species, resulting in the establishment of numerous novel genera such as Alkalihalobacillus, Brevibacillus, Solibacillus, Alicyclobacillus, Virgibacillus and Evansella. In addition, the genus Bacillus has been restricted to only include species closely related to Bacillus subtilis and Bacillus cereus.

The name Margalitia was named to celebrate Professor Joel Margalit (1933-2011, Ben-Gurion University, Israel), and his discovery of the insecticide action of Bacillus thuringiensis var. israelensis, used for controlling mosquitoes and black flies.

== Biochemical characteristics and molecular signatures ==
Members of this genus are aerobic and found in diverse locations such as ripened Pu'er tea and volcanic soils. All members are motile, produce endospores and catalase-positive. Margalitia can survive in temperatures ranging from 20°C to 55°C, but optimal growth occurs in the range of 30-40°C.

Two conserved signature indels (CSIs) have been identified through genomic analysis as exclusive to this genus in the proteins histidine tRNA ligase and peptide chain release factor 3, which can be used as a molecular means to reliably demarcate this genus from other Bacillaceae genera and bacteria.

== Taxonomy ==
Margalitia, as of May 2021, contains a total of 2 species with validly published names. This genus was identified as a monophyletic clade and phylogenetically unrelated to other Bacillus species in studies examining the taxonomic relationships within Bacillus. This branching pattern is also observed in the Genome Taxonomy Database (GTDB).

== Phylogeny ==
16S rRNA based LTP_10_2024

- - - Heyndrickxia ginsengihumi
    - Margalitia shackletonii (Logan et al. 2004) Gupta et al. 2020
  - - Margalitia camelliae (Niu et al. 2018) Gupta et al. 2020
    - Heyndrickxia

120 marker proteins based GTDB 09-RS220

- Margalitia
  - M. camelliae (Niu et al. 2018) Gupta et al. 2020
  - M. shackletonii (Logan et al. 2004) Gupta et al. 2020
