= UDP-glucose—hexose-1-phosphate uridylyltransferase =

Class of enzymes

UDP-glucose:hexose-1-phosphate uridylyltransferase
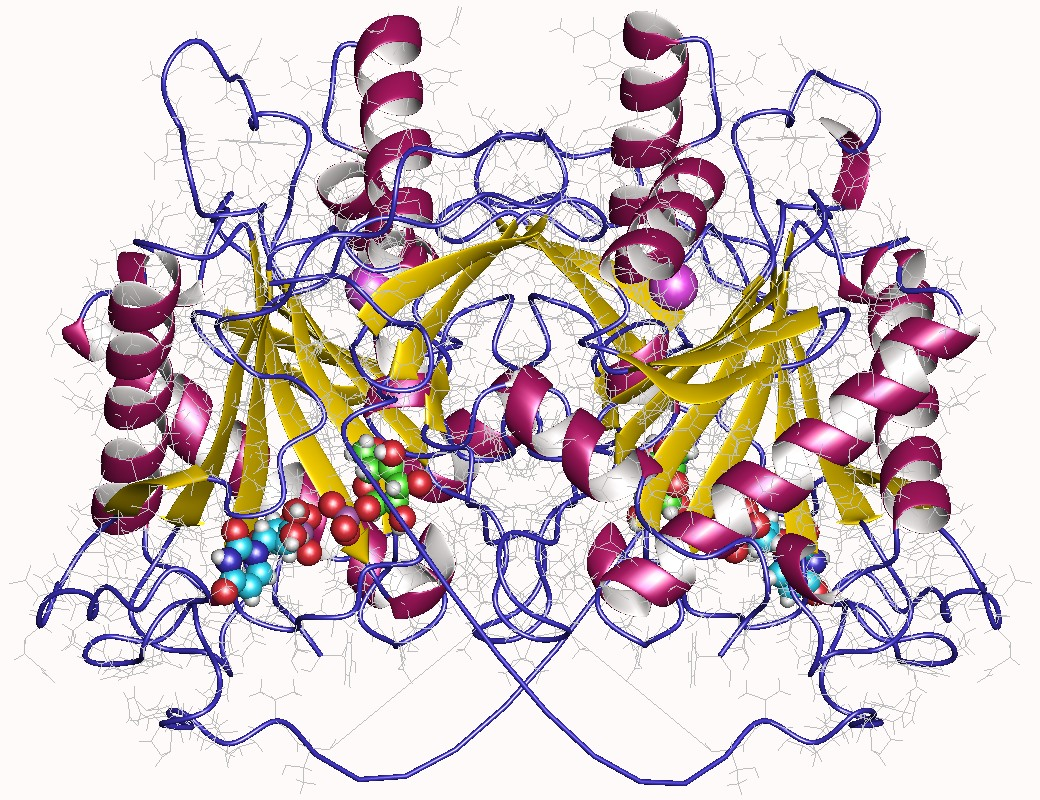
- Galactose-1-phosphate uridylyltransferase homodimer, Human

Identifiers
- EC no.: 2.7.7.12
- CAS no.: 9026-21-5

Databases
- IntEnz: IntEnz view
- BRENDA: BRENDA entry
- ExPASy: NiceZyme view
- KEGG: KEGG entry
- MetaCyc: metabolic pathway
- PRIAM: profile
- PDB structures: RCSB PDB PDBe PDBsum
- Gene Ontology: AmiGO / QuickGO
Search
- PMC: articles
- PubMed: articles
- NCBI: proteins

In enzymology, an UDP-glucose—hexose-1-phosphate uridylyltransferase (EC 2.7.7.12) is an enzyme that catalyzes the chemical reaction

UDP-glucose + alpha-D-galactose 1-phosphate $\rightleftharpoons$ alpha-D-glucose 1-phosphate + UDP-galactose

Thus, the two substrates of this enzyme are UDP-glucose and alpha-D-galactose 1-phosphate, whereas its two products are alpha-D-glucose 1-phosphate and UDP-galactose.

This enzyme belongs to the family of transferases, specifically those transferring phosphorus-containing nucleotide groups (nucleotidyltransferases). The systematic name of this enzyme class is UDP-glucose:alpha-D-galactose-1-phosphate uridylyltransferase. Other names in common use include uridyl transferase, hexose-1-phosphate uridylyltransferase, uridyltransferase, and hexose 1-phosphate uridyltransferase. This enzyme participates in galactose metabolism and nucleotide sugars metabolism.

== Structural studies ==
As of late 2007, 4 structures have been solved for this class of enzymes, with PDB accession codes 1HXQ, 2H39, 2Q4H, and 2Q4L.
