= Margalitia shackletonii =

Scientific classification
- Domain: Bacteria
- Kingdom: Bacillati
- Phylum: Bacillota
- Class: Bacilli
- Order: Bacillales
- Family: Bacillaceae
- Genus: Margalitia
- Species: M. shackletonii

Binomial name
- Margalitia shackletonii (Logan et al. 2004) Gupta et al. 2020

Type strain
- LMG 18435

Synonyms
- Bacillus shackletonii

Species of bacterium

Margalitia shackletonii is a bacterium from the genus of Margalitia which has been isolated from volcanic soil from the Candlemas Island.
