= Dimethylamine-corrinoid protein Co-methyltransferase =

Identifiers
- EC no.: 2.1.1.249

Databases
- IntEnz: IntEnz view
- BRENDA: BRENDA entry
- ExPASy: NiceZyme view
- KEGG: KEGG entry
- MetaCyc: metabolic pathway
- PRIAM: profile
- PDB structures: RCSB PDB PDBe PDBsum
Search
- PMC: articles
- PubMed: articles
- NCBI: proteins

Dimethylamine-corrinoid protein Co-methyltransferase (EC 2.1.1.249, mtbB (gene), dimethylamine methyltransferase) is an enzyme with systematic name dimethylamine:5-hydroxybenzimidazolylcobamide Co-methyltransferase. This enzyme catalyses the following chemical reaction

dimethylamine + [Co(I) dimethylamine-specific corrinoid protein] $\rightleftharpoons$ [methyl-Co(III) dimethylamine-specific corrinoid protein] + methylamine

This enzyme is involved in methanogenesis from dimethylamine.
