= S-layer =

Protein-based part of the cell envelope found in most archaea and some bacteria

An S-layer (surface layer) is a part of the cell envelope found in almost all archaea, as well as in many types of bacteria. The S-layers of both archaea and bacteria consists of a monomolecular layer composed of only one (or, in a few cases, two) identical proteins or glycoproteins, the latter case making it a type of glycocalyx. This structure is built via self-assembly and encloses the whole cell surface. Thus, the S-layer protein can represent up to 15% of the whole protein content of a cell. S-layer proteins are poorly conserved or not conserved at all, and can differ markedly even between related species. Depending on species, the S-layers have a thickness between 5 and 25 nm and possess identical pores 2–8 nm in diameter.

The terminology "S-layer" was used the first time in 1976. The general use was accepted at the "First International Workshop on Crystalline Bacterial Cell Surface Layers, Vienna (Austria)" in 1984, and in the year 1987 S-layers were defined at the European Molecular Biology Organization Workshop on "Crystalline Bacterial Cell Surface Layers", Vienna as "Two-dimensional arrays of proteinaceous subunits forming surface layers on prokaryotic cells" (see "Preface", page VI in Sleytr "et al. 1988"). For a brief summary on the history of S-layer research see "References". A comprehensive historical account of the development of fundamental and applied S-layer research is given in the following current review.

== Location of S-layers ==
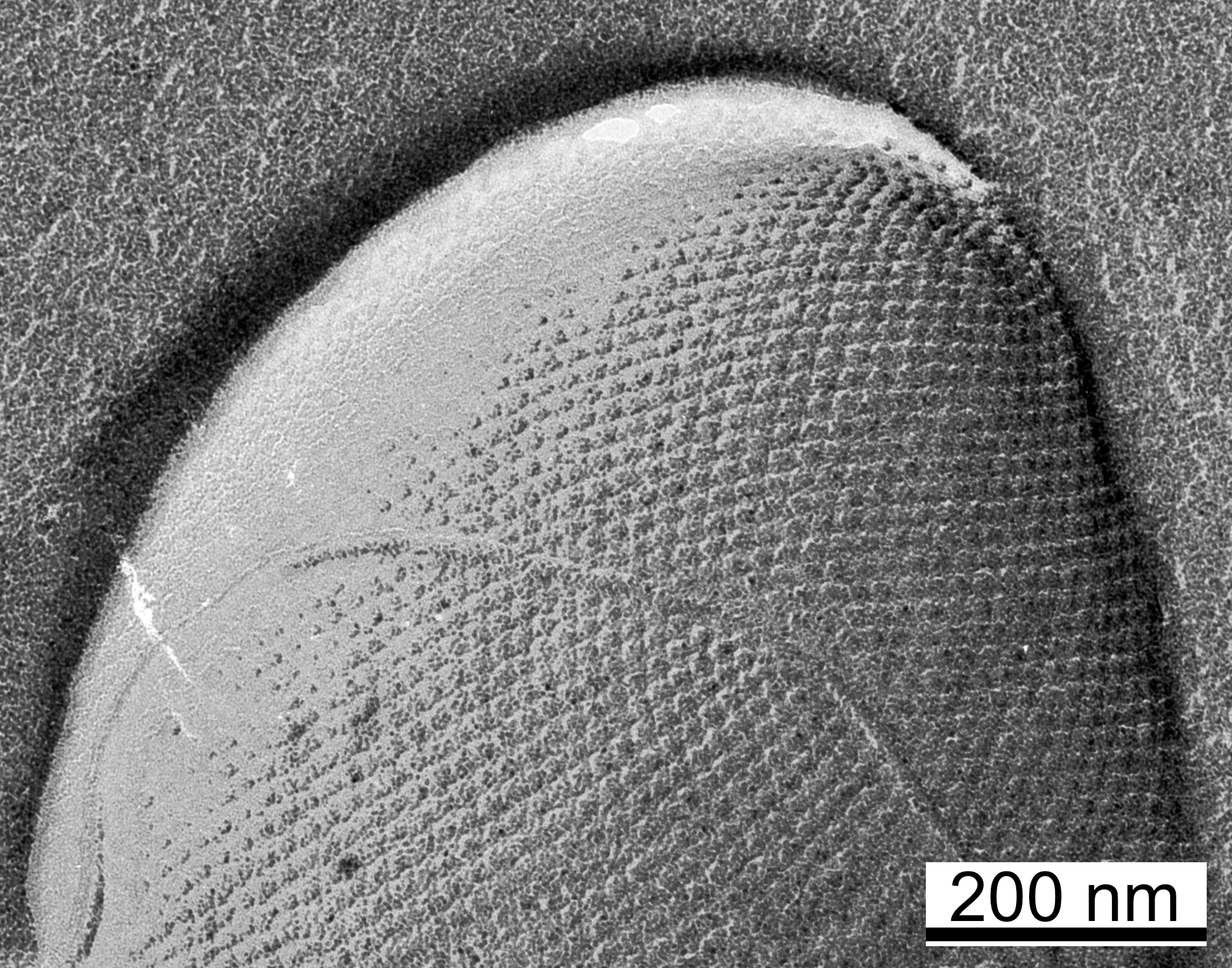
TEM micrograph of a freeze-etched and metal shadowed preparation of the archaeum Methanocorpusculum sinense. The S-layer exhibits hexagonal (p6) lattice symmetry with a center-to-center spacing of approx. 16 nm. The rope like structure is a flagellum that has collapsed on the cell surface during cell centrifugation Creative Commons Attribution 4.0 International (CC BY 4.0) licence.

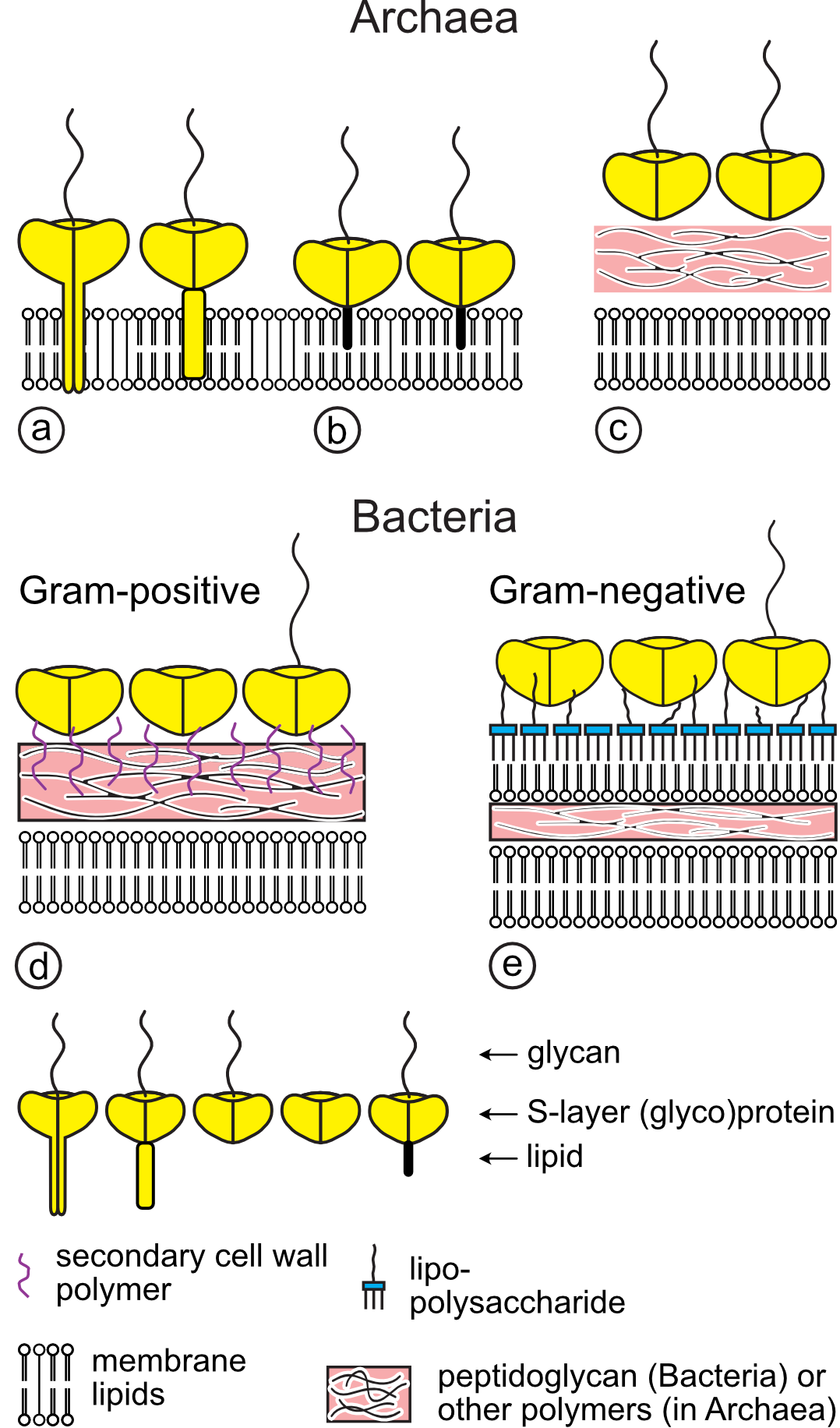
Schematic illustration of the supramolecular architecture of the major classes of prokaryotic cell envelopes containing surface (S) layers. S-layers in archaea with glycoprotein lattices as exclusive wall component are composed either of mushroom-like subunits with pillar-like, hydrophobic trans-membrane domains (a), or lipid-modified glycoprotein subunits (b). Individual S-layers can be composed of glycoproteins possessing both types of membrane anchoring mechanisms. Few archaea possess a rigid wall layer (e.g. pseudomurein in methanogenic organisms) as intermediate layer between the plasma membrane and the S-layer (c). In Gram-positive bacteria (d) the S-layer (glyco)proteins are bound to the rigid peptidoglycan-containing layer via secondary cell wall polymers. In Gram-negative bacteria (e) the S-layer is closely associated with the lipopolysaccharide of the outer membrane. Figure and figure legend were copied from Sleytr et al. 2025, which is available under a Creative Commons Attribution 4.0 International (CC BY 4.0) licence.

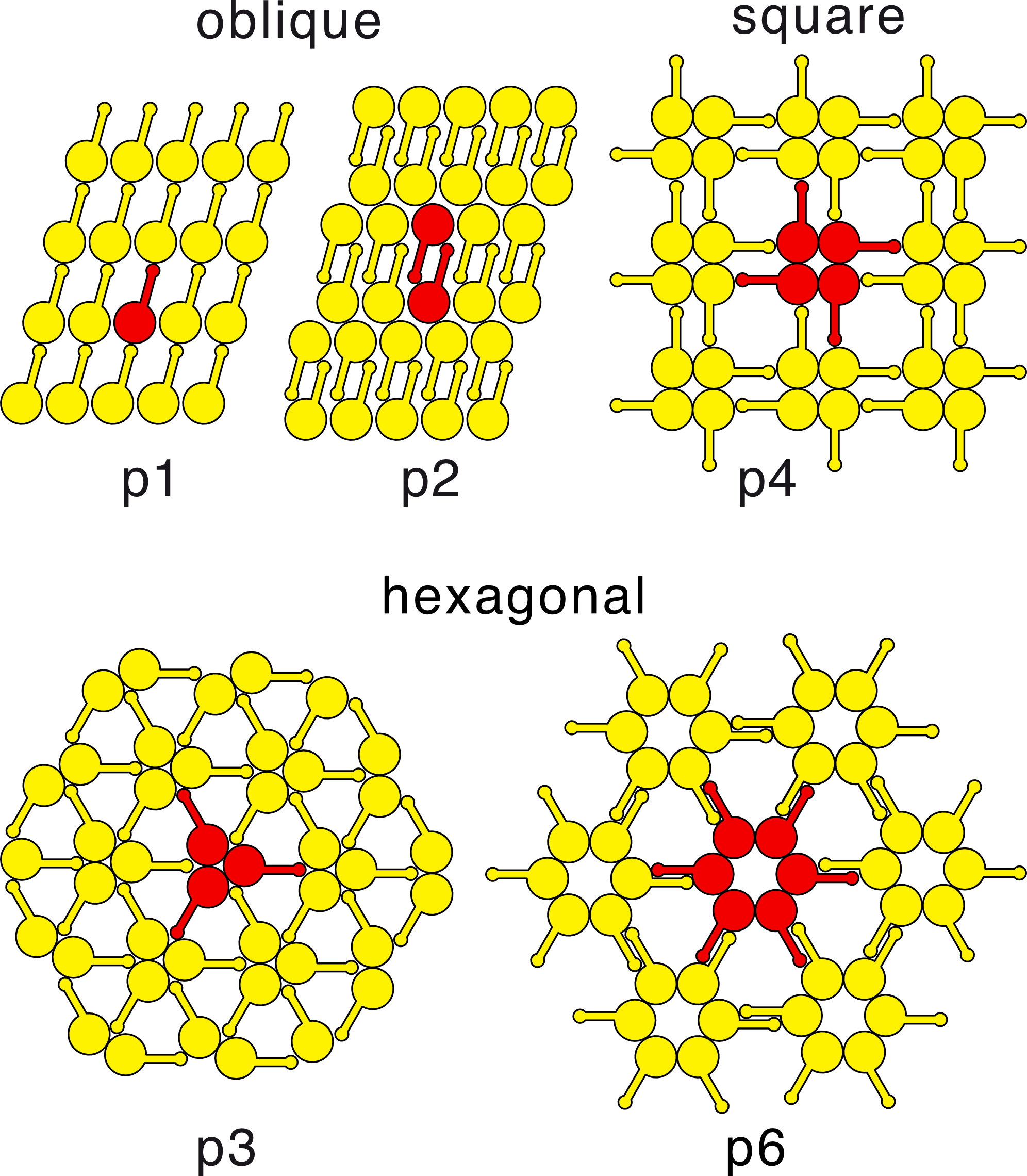
Schematic drawing of the different S-layer lattice types. The proteins of one morphological unit are shown in red. For a more detailed description of the symmetry properties of S-layers see. Creative Commons Attribution 4.0 International (CC BY 4.0) licence.

- In Gram-negative bacteria, S-layers are associated to the lipopolysaccharides via protein–carbohydrate interactions.
- In Gram-positive bacteria whose S-layers often contain surface layer homology (SLH) domains, the binding occurs to the peptidoglycan and to a secondary cell wall polymer (e.g., teichoic acids). In the absence of SLH domains, the binding occurs via electrostatic interactions between the positively charged N-terminus of the S-layer protein and a negatively charged secondary cell wall polymer. In Lactobacilli the binding domain may be located at the C-terminus.
- In Gram-negative archaea, S-layer proteins possess a hydrophobic anchor that is associated with the underlying lipid membrane.
- In Gram-positive archaea, the S-layer proteins bind to pseudomurein or to methanochondroitin.

== Biological functions of the S-layer ==
For many bacteria, the S-layer represents the outermost interaction zone with their respective environment. Its functions are very diverse and vary from species to species. In many archaeal species the S-layer is the only cell wall component and, therefore, is important for mechanical and osmotic stabilization. The S-layer is considered to be porous, which contributes to many of its functions. A most relevant general function of S-layers of both, bacteria and archaea, seems to be their excellent anti-fouling properties. In Archaea that possess S-Layers as the exclusive cell wall component, a general function of S-layer lattices is that of a cell shape-determining/maintaining scaffold. For an overview of functions of S-layers, see. The spectrum of functions associated with S-layers include:

- protection against bacteriophages, Bdellovibrios, and phagocytosis
- resistance against low pH
- barrier against high-molecular-weight substances (e.g., lytic enzymes)
- adhesion (for glycosylated S-layers)
- stabilization of the membrane (e.g. the SDBC in Deinococcus radiodurans)
- resistance against electromagnetic stress (e.g. ionizing radiations and high temperatures)
- provision of adhesion sites for exoproteins
- provision of a periplasmic compartment in Gram-positive prokaryotes together with the peptidoglycan and the cytoplasmic membranes
- biomineralization
- molecular sieve and barrier function

A great example of a bacterium which utilizes the biological functions of the S-layer is Clostridioides difficile. In C. difficile, the S-layer has helped with biofilm formation, host cell adhesion, and immunomodulation through cell signaling of the host response.

== S-layer structure ==
While ubiquitous among Archaea, and common in bacteria, the S-layers of diverse organisms have unique structural properties, including symmetry and unit cell dimensions, due to fundamental differences in their constituent building blocks. Sequence analyses of S-layer proteins have predicted that S-layer proteins have sizes of 40-200 kDa and may be composed of multiple domains some of which may be structurally related. Since the first evidence of a macromolecular array on a bacterial cell wall fragment in the 1950s, S-layer structures have been investigated extensively by electron microscopy. These studies have provided useful information on overall S-layer morphology.

In general, S-layers exhibit either oblique (p1, p2), square (p4) or hexagonal (p3, p6) lattice symmetry. Depending on the lattice symmetry, each morphological unit of the S-layer is composed of one (p1), two (p2), three (p3), four (p4), or six (p6) identical protein subunits. The center-to-center spacing (or unit cell dimensions) between these subunits range from 4 to 35 nm.

For example, high-resolution structures of an archaeal S-layer protein (MA0829 from Methanosarcina acetivorans C2A) of the Methanosarcinales S-layer Tile Protein family and a bacterial S-layer protein (SbsB), from Geobacillus stearothermophilus PV72, have been determined by X-ray crystallography. In contrast with existing crystal structures, which have represented individual domains of S-layer proteins or minor proteinaceous components of the S-layer, the MA0829 and SbsB structures have allowed high resolution models of the M. acetivorans and G. stearothermophilus S-layers to be proposed. These models exhibit hexagonal (p6) and oblique (p2) symmetry, for M. acetivorans and G. stearothermophilus S-layers, respectively, and their molecular features, including dimensions and porosity, are in good agreement with data from electron microscopy studies of archaeal and bacterial S-layers.

Finally, in connection with questions of structure-function investigations on S-layers, it should be mentioned that the recent introduction of SymProFold, which utlizes the high accuracy of AlphaFold-Multimer predictions to derive symmetrical assemblies from protein sequeces has proven to be a groundbreaking method for the accurate structural prediction of S-layer arrays. The predicted models could be vallidated using available experimental data at the cellular level, and additional crystal structures were obtained to confirm the symmetry and interfaces of numerous SymProFold assemblies. Thus, this methodological approach to the structural elucidation of S-layers opens possibilities for exploring functionalities and designing targeted applications in diverse fields such as nanotechnology, biotechnology, nanomedicine, and environmental sciences.

== Self-assembly ==
=== In vivo assembly ===
Assembly of a highly ordered coherent monomolecular S-layer array on a growing cell surface requires a continuous synthesis of a surplus of S-layer proteins and their translocation to sites of lattice growth. Moreover, information concerning this dynamic process were obtained from reconstitution experiments with isolated S-layer subunits on cell surfaces from which they had been removed (homologous reattachment) or on those of other organisms (heterologous reattachment).

=== In vitro assembly ===
S-layer proteins have the natural capability to self-assemble into regular monomolecular arrays in solution and at interfaces, such as solid supports, the air-water interface, lipid films, liposomes, emulsomes, nanocapsules, nanoparticles or micro beads. S-layer crystal growth follows a non-classical pathway in which a final refolding step of the S-layer protein is part of the lattice formation.

== Application ==
Native S-layer proteins have already been used three decades ago in the development of biosensors and ultrafiltration membranes. Subsequently, S-layer fusion proteins with specific functional domains (e.g. enzymes, ligands, mimotopes, antibodies or antigens) allowed to investigate completely new strategies for functionalizing surfaces in the life sciences, such as in the development of novel affinity matrices, mucosal vaccines, biocompatible surfaces, micro carriers and encapsulation systems, or in the material sciences as templates for biomineralization.
