= Methanosarcina thermophila =

Scientific classification
- Domain: Archaea
- Kingdom: Methanobacteriati
- Phylum: Methanobacteriota
- Class: "Methanomicrobia"
- Order: Methanosarcinales
- Family: Methanosarcinaceae
- Genus: Methanosarcina
- Species: M. thermophila

Binomial name
- Methanosarcina thermophila McCammon and Bowman 2000

Species of archaeon

Methanosarcina thermophila is a thermophilic, acetotrophic, methane-producing archaeon.
