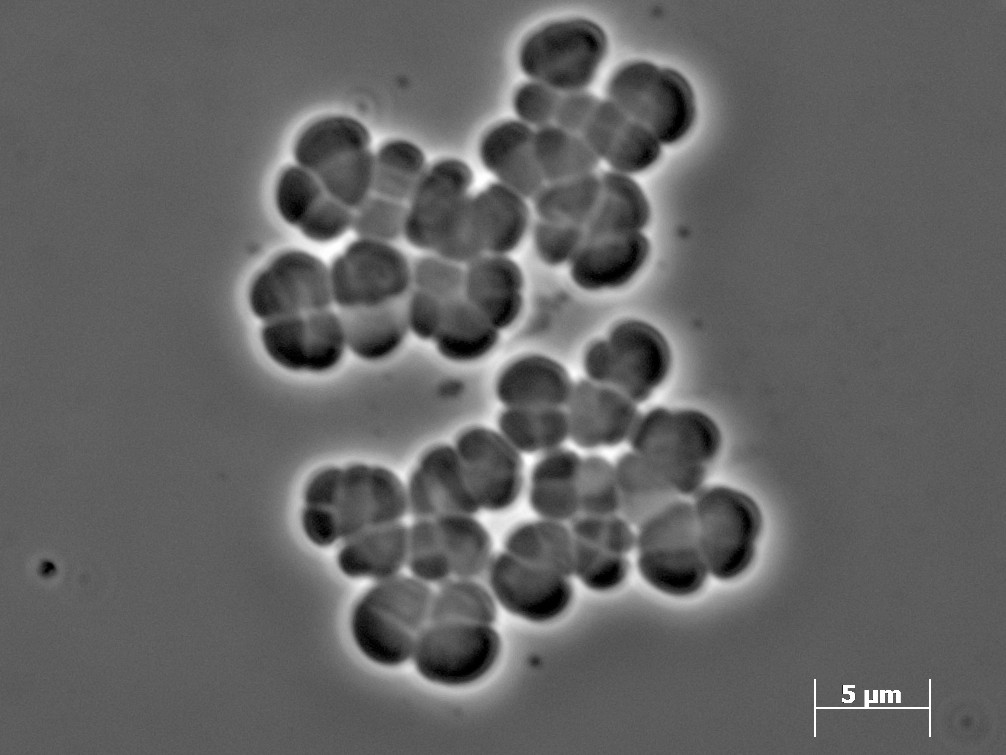
- Phase-contrast photo of Methanosarcina barkeri, type strain MS^{T}

Scientific classification
- Domain: Archaea
- Kingdom: Methanobacteriati
- Phylum: Methanobacteriota
- Class: "Methanomicrobia"
- Order: Methanosarcinales
- Family: Methanosarcinaceae
- Genus: Methanosarcina
- Species: M. barkeri

Binomial name
- Methanosarcina barkeri Schnellen 1947

= Methanosarcina barkeri =

Species of archaea

Methanosarcina barkeri is a methane-producing species of archaea and the type species of the genus Methanosarcina, characterized by its wide range of substrates used in methanogenesis. While most known methanogens produce methane from H_{2} and CO_{2}, M. barkeri can also dismutate methylated compounds such as methanol or methylamines, oxidize acetate, and reduce methylated compounds with H_{2}. This makes M. barkeri one of the few Methanosarcina species capable of utilizing all four known methanogenesis pathways. Even among other Methanosarcinales, which commonly utilize a broad range of substrates, the ability to grow on H_{2} and CO_{2} is rare due to the requirement for high H_{2} partial pressure. Like other Methanosarcina species, M. barkeri has a large genome (4.53 Mbp for the type strain MS, 4.9 Mbp for the Wiesmoor strain, and 4.5 Mbp for the CM2 strain), although it is significantly smaller than the largest archaeal genome of Methanosarcina acetivorans (5.75 Mbp for the type strain C2A). It is also one of the few archaea, particularly among anaerobic species, that is genetically tractable and can be used for genetic studies.

== Isolation and Physiology ==
The type strain of the species designated as MS (DSM 800, JCM 10043, ATCC 43569) was isolated from the sewage digester. It was designated as neotype of the species because the original type strain of M. barkeri described in the PhD thesis of Charles Schnellen in 1947 was lost. Besides the type strain MS, a few more strains of M. barkeri described. For example, the strain Fusaro is commonly used for genetic studies of Methanosarcina. It was isolated in mud samples taken from Lake Fusaro, a freshwater lake near Naples. As other Methanosarcina species, M. barkeri can also be found in marine and freshwater sediments, sewage, soil, and landfills.

Morphology of Methanosarcina cells depends on growing conditions, e.g. on salt concentrations. M. barkeri shows this variable morphology: when grown in freshwater medium, these microbes grow into large, multicellular aggregates embedded in a matrix of methanochondroitin, while growing in marine environment as single, irregular cocci, only surrounded by the S-layer, but no methanochondroitin. The aggregates can grow large enough to be seen by the naked eye. Methanosarcina could produce positive Gram stain, but generally, it is Gram variable. M. barkeri has a thick cell wall compounded by a short lipid cell membrane that is similar in structure to most other methanogens. However, its cell walls do not contain peptidoglycan. M. barkeri str. fusaro has no flagellum but has potential for movement through the creation of gas vesicles. These gas vesicles have only been produced in the presence of hydrogen and carbon dioxide, likely acting as a response to a hydrogen gradient. M. barkeri's chromosome is large and circular, derived from its remarkable ability to metabolize a variety of different carbon molecules. This offers the species an advantage as though it is immotile, it can adapt to its environment depending on the energy sources available. M. barkeri's circular plasmid consists of about twenty (Note: In "Methanosarcina barkeri str. Fusaro plasmid 1, complete sequence", GenBank: CP000098.1, 20 genes were annotated, 18 for “CDS” and two for “pseudo”.) genes.

== Applications and importance ==
Methanosarcina barkeri's unique nature as an anaerobic methanogen that ferments many carbon sources can have many implications for future biotechnology and environmental studies. As M. barkeri is found in the rumen of cows, a place with an extreme dearth of oxygen, it is classified as an extreme anaerobe. Furthermore, the methane gas produced by cows due to M. barkeri could play a role in greenhouse gas production. However, since M. barkeri can survive in extreme conditions and produce methane, M. barkeri can be implemented in low pH ecosystems, effectively neutralizing the acidity environment, and making it more amenable for other methanogens. This, in turn, would allow people to harness the pure methane produced at landfills or through cow waste. Evidently, the implications of M. barkeri are those aligned with potential alternative energy and investment.
