= Phosphate acetyltransferase =

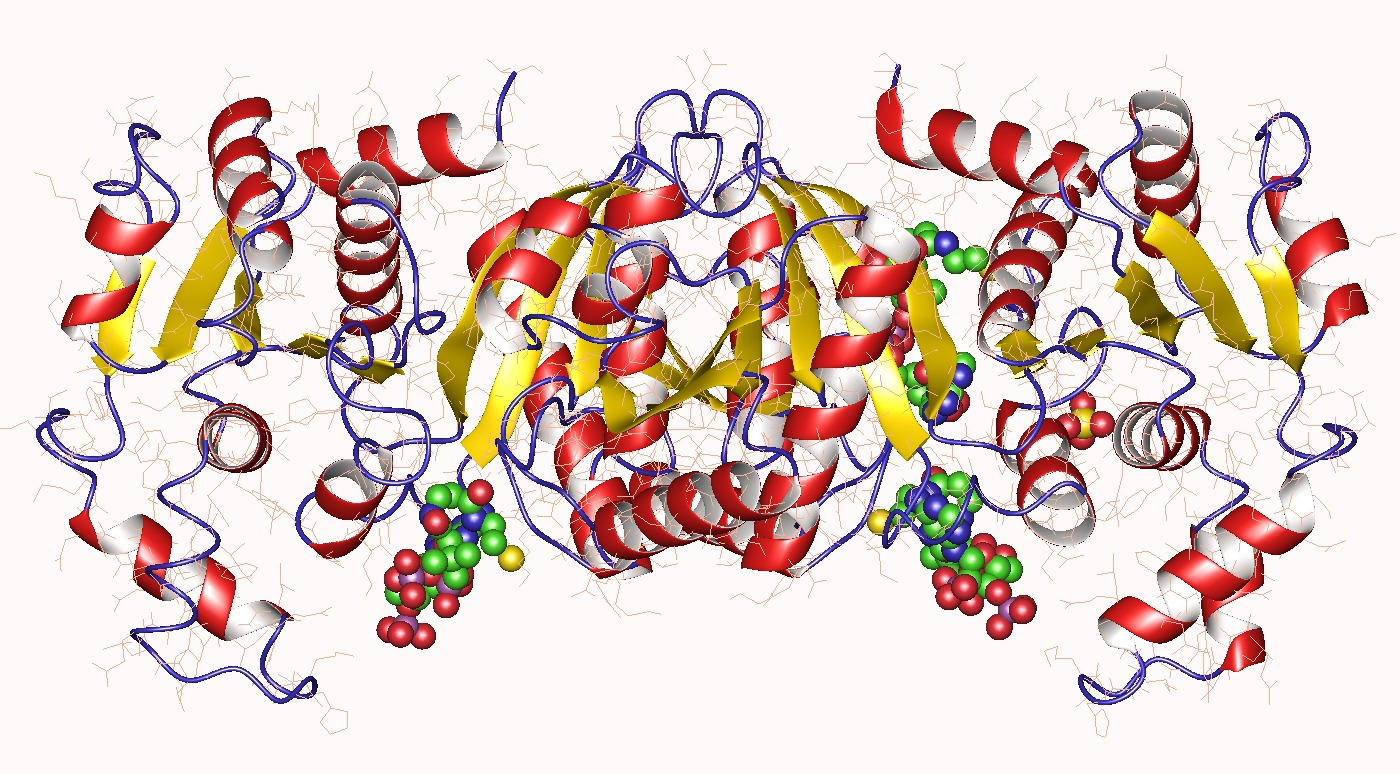
- Phosphate acetyltransferase homodimer, Methanosarcina thermophila

Identifiers
- EC no.: 2.3.1.8
- CAS no.: 9029-91-8

Databases
- IntEnz: IntEnz view
- BRENDA: BRENDA entry
- ExPASy: NiceZyme view
- KEGG: KEGG entry
- MetaCyc: metabolic pathway
- PRIAM: profile
- PDB structures: RCSB PDB PDBe PDBsum
- Gene Ontology: AmiGO / QuickGO
Search
- PMC: articles
- PubMed: articles
- NCBI: proteins

Phosphate acetyltransferase (EC 2.3.1.8) is an enzyme that catalyzes the chemical reaction

phosphoric acid
+
acetyl-CoA
acetyl phosphate
+ coenzyme A

The substrates of this enzyme are phosphate and acetyl-CoA. Its products are acetyl phosphate and coenzyme A. It was characterised from Clostridium kluyveri.

This enzyme belongs to the family of transferases, specifically those acyltransferases transferring groups other than aminoacyl groups. The systematic name of this enzyme class is acetyl-CoA:phosphate acetyltransferase. Other names in common use include phosphotransacetylase, phosphoacylase, and PTA. This enzyme participates in three metabolic pathways: taurine and hypotaurine metabolism, pyruvate metabolism, and propanoate metabolism.

== Structural studies ==
As of late 2007, 7 structures have been solved for this class of enzymes, with PDB accession codes 1QZT, 1R5J, 1TD9, 1VMI, 1XCO, 2AF3, and 2AF4.
