= N-Methylornithine =

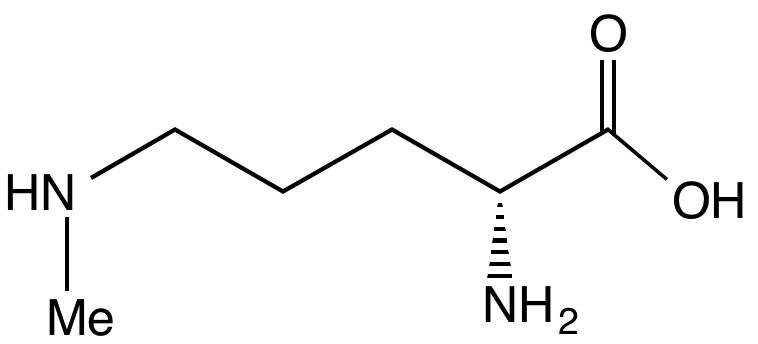

Names
- Systematic IUPAC name N^{2}-Methylornithine

Identifiers
| CAS Number | 3485-66-3 |
| 3D model (JSmol) | Interactive image |
| ChemSpider | 372810 |
| PubChem CID | 14131889 |
| UNII | TLD8F6X3N7 |
| CompTox Dashboard (EPA) | DTXSID601314929 |
- InChI: InChI=1S/C6H14N2O2/c1-8-5(6(9)10)3-2-4-7/h5,8H,2-4,7H2,1H3,(H,9,10) Key: OZRWQPFBXDVLAH-UHFFFAOYSA-N
- SMILES: CNC(CCCN)C(=O)O

Properties
| Chemical formula | C_{6}H_{14}N_{2}O_{2} |
| Molar mass | 146.190 g·mol^{−1} |
| Appearance | White solid |
| Density | 1.082 g/cm^{3} |
| Melting point | 217 °C (423 °F; 490 K) |
- Except where otherwise noted, data are given for materials in their standard state (at 25 °C [77 °F], 100 kPa). Infobox references

N-Methylornithine is an amino acid with the formula CH_{3}N(H)(CH_{2})_{3}CH(NH_{2})CO_{2}H. It is a white solid. It occurs naturally, albeit rarely.
