= Acetate kinase =

Class of enzymes

Acetate_kinase
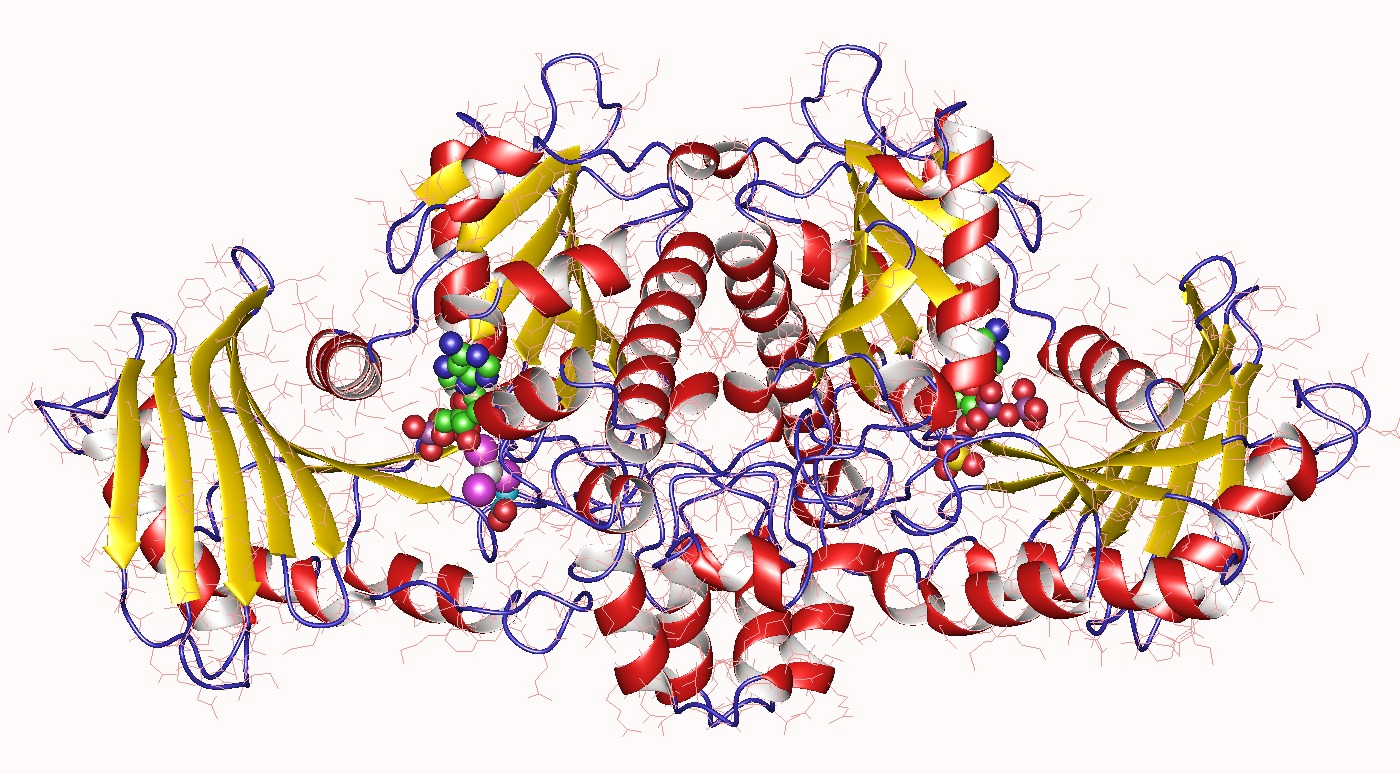
- Acetate kinase homodimer, Methanosarcina thermophila

Identifiers
- Symbol: Acetate_kinase
- Pfam: PF00871
- Pfam clan: CL0108
- InterPro: IPR000890
- PROSITE: PDOC00826
- SCOP2: 1g99 / SCOPe / SUPFAM
Available protein structures:
- PDB: IPR000890 PF00871 (ECOD; PDBsum)
- AlphaFold: IPR000890; PF00871

In molecular biology, acetate kinase (EC 2.7.2.1), which is predominantly found in micro-organisms, facilitates the production of acetyl-CoA by phosphorylating acetate in the presence of ATP and a divalent cation.

== Function ==
The enzyme characterised from many species of bacteria and archaea including Bacillus subtilis, Lactobacillus sanfranciscensis, and Methanosarcina thermophila catalyses the phosphorylation of acetic acid:

ATP +
acetic acid
ADP +
acetyl phosphate

A phosphate group is transferred from the cofactor, adenosine triphosphate (ATP), which is converted to adenosine diphosphate (ADP).

The enzyme is not always specific for acetate: in Methanosarcina thermophila it also acts on propionic acid. In one variant found in Escherichia coli this is the major function of the enzyme, when it degrades L-threonine.

== Role in metabolism ==
Short-chain fatty acids (SCFAs) play a major role in carbon cycle and can be utilized as a source of carbon and energy by bacteria. Salmonella typhimurium propionate kinase (StTdcD) catalyzes reversible transfer of the γ-phosphate of ATP to propionate during l-threonine degradation to propionate. Kinetic analysis revealed that StTdcD possesses broad ligand specificity and could be activated by various SCFAs (propionate>acetate≈butyrate), nucleotides (ATP≈GTP>CTP≈TTP; dATP>dGTP>dCTP) and metal ions (Mg^{2+}≈Mn^{2+}>Co^{2+}). Inhibition of StTdcD by tricarboxylic acid (TCA) cycle intermediates such as citrate, succinate, α-ketoglutarate and malate suggests that the enzyme could be under plausible feedback regulation. Crystal structures of StTdcD bound to PO_{4} (phosphate), AMP, ATP, Ap4 (adenosine tetraphosphate), GMP, GDP, GTP, CMP and CTP revealed that binding of nucleotide mainly involves hydrophobic interactions with the base moiety and could account for the broad biochemical specificity observed between the enzyme and nucleotides. Modelling and site-directed mutagenesis studies suggest Ala88 to be an important residue involved in determining the rate of catalysis with SCFA substrates. Molecular dynamics simulations on monomeric and dimeric forms of StTdcD revealed plausible open and closed states, and also suggested role for dimerization in stabilizing segment 235-290 involved in interfacial interactions and ligand binding. Observation of an ethylene glycol molecule bound sufficiently close to the γ-phosphate in StTdcD complexes with triphosphate nucleotides supports direct in-line phosphoryl transfer. The enzyme is important in the process of glycolysis, enzyme levels being increased in the presence of excess glucose. The growth of a bacterial mutant lacking acetate kinase has been shown to be inhibited by glucose, suggesting that the enzyme is involved in excretion of excess carbohydrate. A related enzyme, butyrate kinase, facilitates the formation of butyryl-CoA by phosphorylating butyrate in the presence of ATP to form butyryl phosphate.
