= 3-Methylornithine =

Names
- Other names 5-Aminoisoleucine

Identifiers
CAS Number	1224728-50-0
3D model (JSmol)	Interactive image
ChemSpider	26001508
KEGG	C20277
PubChem CID	87372817
UNII	VA9MPN8J47
CompTox Dashboard (EPA)	DTXSID901045789
- InChI: InChI=1S/C6H14N2O2/c1-4(2-3-7)5(8)6(9)10/h4-5H,2-3,7-8H2,1H3,(H,9,10)/t4-,5-/m1/s1 Key: HYUPFEBCCJWDJX-RFZPGFLSSA-N; InChI=1/C6H14N2O2/c1-4(2-3-7)5(8)6(9)10/h4-5H,2-3,7-8H2,1H3,(H,9,10)/t4-,5-/m1/s1 Key: HYUPFEBCCJWDJX-RFZPGFLSBQ
- SMILES: C[C@H](CCN)[C@H](C(=O)O)N

Properties
Chemical formula	C_{6}H_{14}N_{2}O_{2}
Molar mass	146.190 g·mol^{−1}
Appearance	White solid
Density	1.121 g/cm^{3}
- Except where otherwise noted, data are given for materials in their standard state (at 25 °C [77 °F], 100 kPa). Infobox references

3-Methylornithine is an amino acid with the formula H_{2}N(CH_{2})_{2}CH(CH_{3})CH(NH_{2})CO_{2}H. This amino acid contains two stereogenic centers, but only one stereoisomer (namely (3R)-3-methyl-D-ornithine) occurs in nature. It is produced from lysine by the action of the enzyme methylornithine synthase. The combination of lysine and 3-methylornithine, also mediated enzymatically, produces pyrrolysine, which, for some organisms, is a 22nd genetically coded amino acid.

Structure of pyrrolysine, which is biosynthesized from methylornithine and lysine

== See also ==
- Ornithine
