= Acetyl phosphate =

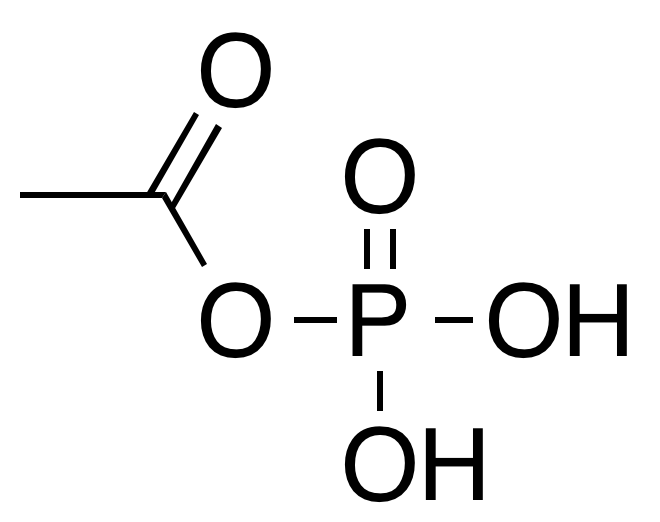

Names
- Other names phosphono acetate, acetyl dihydrogen phosphate

Identifiers
CAS Number	590-54-5
3D model (JSmol)	Interactive image
Abbreviations	AcP
ChEBI	CHEBI:15350
ChemSpider	181
DrugBank	DB02897
KEGG	C00227
PubChem CID	186
UNII	54979W5TJB
CompTox Dashboard (EPA)	DTXSID40207738
- InChI: InChI=1S/C2H5O5P/c1-2(3)7-8(4,5)6/h1H3,(H2,4,5,6) Key: LIPOUNRJVLNBCD-UHFFFAOYSA-N
- SMILES: CC(=O)OP(=O)(O)O

Properties
Chemical formula	C_{2}H_{5}O_{5}P
Molar mass	140.031 g·mol^{−1}
- Except where otherwise noted, data are given for materials in their standard state (at 25 °C [77 °F], 100 kPa). Infobox references

Acetyl phosphate is an monophosphate with an acetyl group linked to one of its oxygen atoms. It plays a role in E.coli, human, and mouse metabolism. Acetyl phosphate has a molecular formula of C_{2}H_{5}O_{5}P.

== Discovery ==
Fritz Albert Lipmann discovered that oxidation of pyruvic acid in biological systems was dependent on the presence of inorganic phosphate. Lipmann added radioactive phosphate and adenylic acid and found that pyruvate oxidation yielded adenosine triphosphate. He showed that a crude preparation of the product could transfer phosphate to adenylic acid. After several years, he definitively identified the initial product of pyruvic acid oxidation as acetyl phosphate.

== AckA-Pta pathway ==
Acetyl phosphate is the intermediate of the AckA-Pta pathway and acts as a global signal in E. coli. Acetyl phosphate signals through two-component response regulators, it is unclear if it acts as the direct phospho donor or functions through an indirect mechanism. Pta-AckA pathway utilize two key enzymes Pta (phosphotransacetylase) and AckA (acetate kinase). The enzymes interconverts the following molecules acetyl-CoA (A central metabolic intermediate), coenzyme A (HS-CoA), acetyl-phosphate (high energy intermediate), ATP, ADP, Pi (inorganic phosphate), and acetate. The forward reaction is the acetate activation and is used when cells need to produce acetyl-CoA with acetyl-phosphate being the intermediate to the product. The reverse direction is acetogenesis and is used when cells excrete excess carbon or regenerate ATP. The following reaction occur using either Pta or AckA

acetyl-CoA + Pi → acetyl-phosphate (Pta)
acetyl-phosphate + ADP → acetate + ATP (AckA).

Acetyl phosphate is analogous to acetyl chloride and acetic anhydride. Its lifetime at room temperature in a neutral solution is several hours and it can be kept for weeks without appreciable deterioration at −35 °C. It is stable in acidic solution between pH 5 and 6. In bacteria and archaea, acetyl phosphate is generated with the phosphorylation of acetyl-CoA. Catalyzed by acetyl phosphate synthase, enzyme found on certain microorganism.Then acetyl phosphate phosphorylates ADP to ATP between the thioester and the phosphate metabolism. Acetyl phosphate can phosphorylate some intermediates in nucleotides synthesis (ribose to ribose-5-phosphate, adenosine to AMP and ADP to ATP) like ATP. At more alkaline pH it tends to acetylate the amino groups on amino acids and the hydroxide groups on ribose.

== Applications ==
Acetyl phosphate is commercially used for industrial applications as a phosphorylating agent to synthesize antibiotics, antiviral drugs and anticancer agents. Because of its ability to modify proteins and nucleic acids it is mostly used for drug development. It is commonly used in biochemistry research because of its ability as an acyl group donor.

Acetyl phosphate can be synthesized in water under ambient conditions from thioacetate. The synthesized AcP is then stable over hours making it both stable and reactive. AcP can behave similarly to ATP in that it can phosphorylate biological substrates. Acetyl phosphate is capable of phosphorylation in water. This aligns with the idea that polymeric enzymes or ribosomes were preceded by monomer catalysis at the origin of life.

== Phosphorylating ADP to ATP ==
ATP is an important energy source for many living organisms. The most plausible and arguable ancestral mechanism for ATP synthesis is through the substrate-level phosphorylation of ADP to ATP by acetyl phosphate (AcP). With Acetyl phosphate being an intermediate and bridging between a thioester and a phosphate metabolism being mentioned above and even the topic of linking acetyl CoA to the substrate-level phosphorylation of ADP can potentially find an early relationship to the prebiotic origins of ATP as the universal energy currency. Acetyl Phosphate shows that it can phosphorylate ADP to ATP in aquatic areas with having iron (III) ion present and it can suggest that the substrate-level phosphorylation could potentially take place in aqueous prebiotic conditions. Acetyl Phosphate's phosphorylation process could lead to researching deeper into the reasons why ATP is the universal source across all life from the beginning of time until now. ATP This phosphorylation process is favored in aqueous solution under mild prebiotic conditions and acetyl phosphate could be the key.
