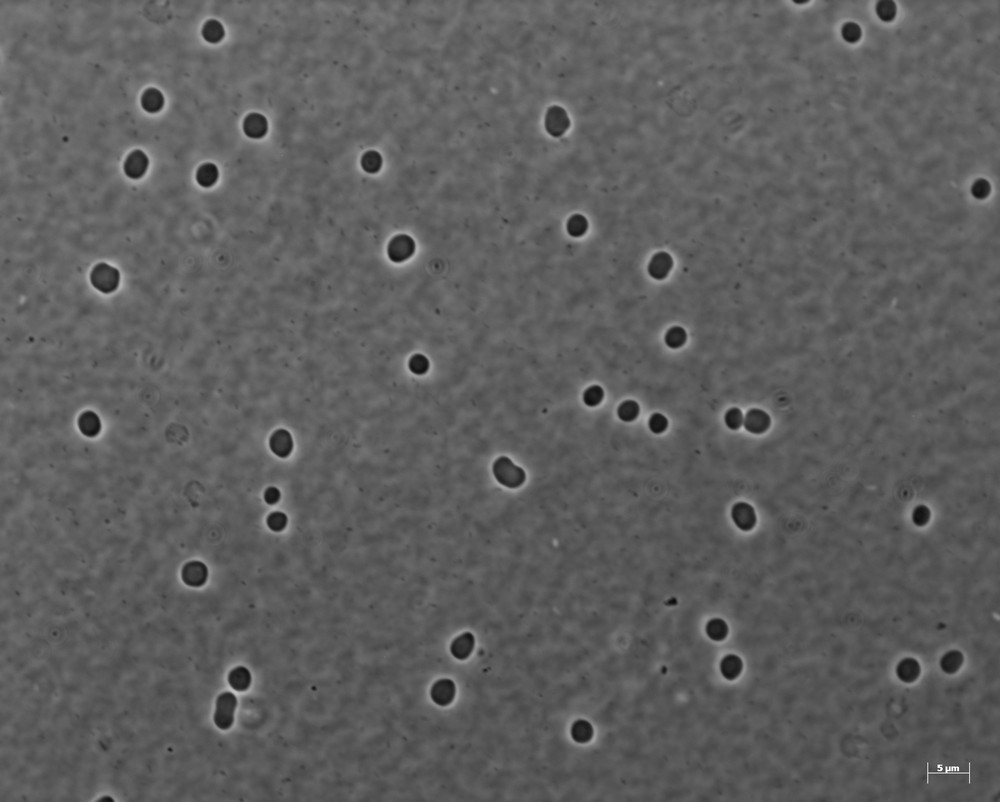
- Phase-contrast photo of Methanosarcina acetivorans, type strain C2A^{T}

Scientific classification
- Domain: Archaea
- Kingdom: Methanobacteriati
- Phylum: Methanobacteriota
- Class: "Methanomicrobia"
- Order: Methanosarcinales
- Family: Methanosarcinaceae
- Genus: Methanosarcina
- Species: M. acetivorans

Binomial name
- Methanosarcina acetivorans Sowers et al. 1986

= Methanosarcina acetivorans =

Species of archaeon

Methanosarcina acetivorans is a versatile methane producing microbe which is found in such diverse environments as oil wells, trash dumps, deep-sea hydrothermal vents, and oxygen-depleted sediments beneath kelp beds. Only M. acetivorans and microbes in the genus Methanosarcina use all three known metabolic pathways for methanogenesis. Methanosarcinides, including M. acetivorans, are also the only archaea capable of forming multicellular colonies, and even show cellular differentiation. The genome of M. acetivorans is one of the largest archaeal genomes ever sequenced. Furthermore, one strain of M. acetivorans, M. a. C2A, has been identified to possess an F-type ATPase (unusual for archaea, but common for bacteria, mitochondria and chloroplasts) along with an A-type ATPase.

== Metabolism ==
M. acetivorans has been noted for its ability to metabolize carbon monoxide to form acetate and formate. It can also oxidize carbon monoxide into carbon dioxide. The carbon dioxide can then be converted into methane in a process which M. acetivorans uses to conserve energy. It has been suggested that this pathway may be similar to metabolic pathways used by primitive cells.

However, in the presence of minerals containing iron sulfides, as might have been found in sediments in a primordial environment, acetate would be catalytically converted into acetate thioester, a sulfur-containing derivative. Primitive microbes could obtain biochemical energy in the form of adenosine triphosphate (ATP) by converting acetate thioester back into acetate using PTS and ACK, which would then be converted back into acetate thioester to complete the process. In such an environment, a primitive "protocell" could easily produce energy through this metabolic pathway, excreting acetate as waste. Furthermore, ACK catalyzes the synthesis of ATP directly. Other pathways generate energy from ATP only through complex multi-enzyme reactions involving protein pumps and osmotic imbalances across a membrane.

== History ==
M. acetivorans was isolated in 1984 from marine sediment obtained at Scripps Canyon.

== See also ==
- RNA world
- Origin of life
