= Chromosome 7 =

Human chromosome

- Human chromosome 7 pair after G-banding. One is from mother, one is from father.

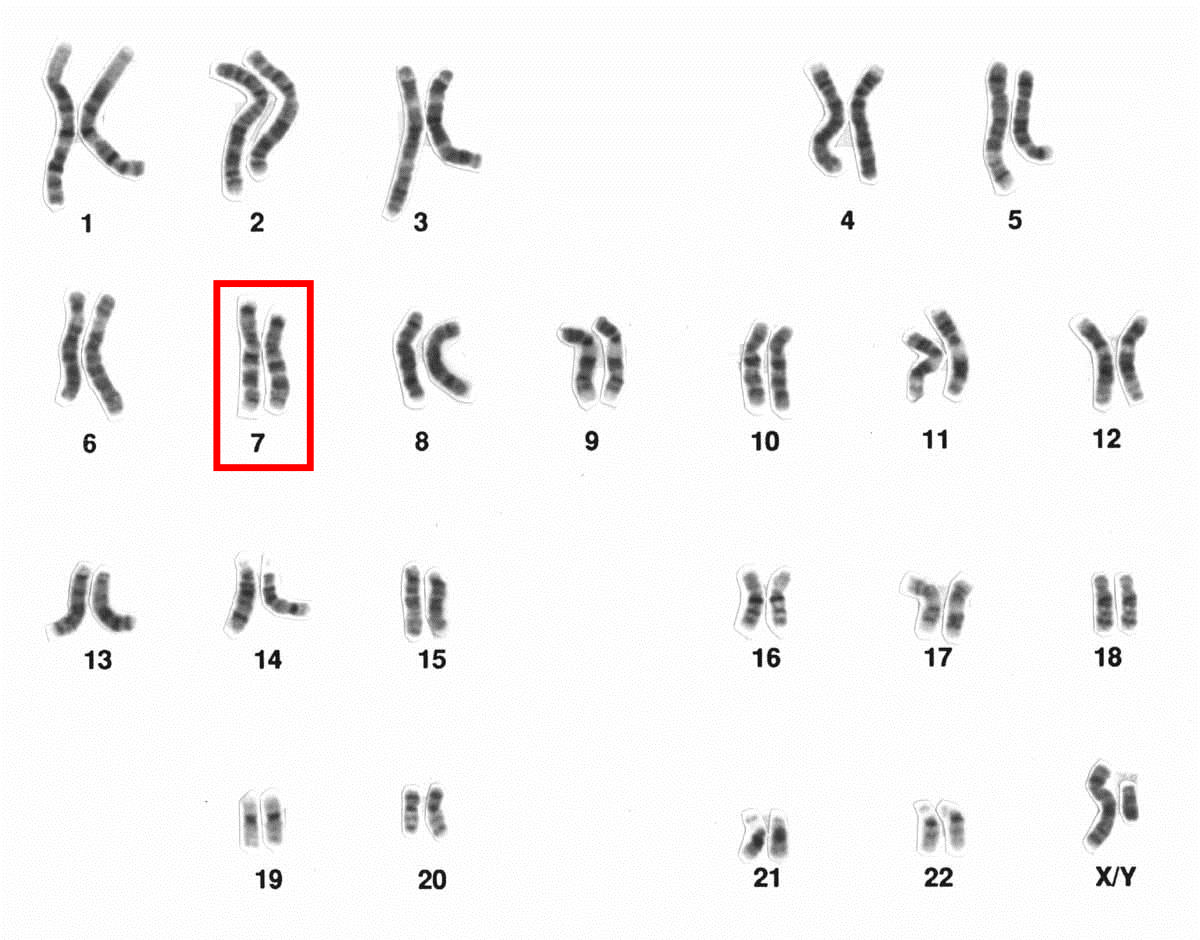
- Chromosome 7 pair in human male karyogram.

Features
- Length (bp): 160,567,428 bp (CHM13)
- No. of genes: 862 (CCDS)
- Type: Autosome
- Centromere position: Submetacentric (60.1 Mbp)

Complete gene lists
- CCDS: Gene list
- HGNC: Gene list
- UniProt: Gene list
- NCBI: Gene list

External map viewers
- Ensembl: Chromosome 7
- Entrez: Chromosome 7
- NCBI: Chromosome 7
- UCSC: Chromosome 7

Full DNA sequences
- RefSeq: NC_000007 (FASTA)
- GenBank: CM000669 (FASTA)

Chromosome 7 is one of the 23 pairs of chromosomes in humans, who normally have two copies of this chromosome. Chromosome 7 spans about 160 million base pairs (the building material of DNA) and represents between 5 and 5.5 percent of the total DNA in cells.

== Genes ==
=== Number of genes ===
The following are some of the gene count estimates of human chromosome 7. Because researchers use different approaches to genome annotation their predictions of the number of genes on each chromosome varies (for technical details, see gene prediction). Among various projects, the collaborative consensus coding sequence project (CCDS) takes an extremely conservative strategy. So CCDS's gene number prediction represents a lower bound on the total number of human protein-coding genes.

Estimated by	Protein-coding genes	Non-coding RNA genes	Pseudogenes	Source	Release date
CCDS	862	—	—		2016-09-08
HGNC	870	245	703		2017-05-12
Ensembl	984	973	889		2017-03-29
UniProt	944	—	—		2018-02-28
NCBI	948	905	933		2017-05-19

=== Partial gene list ===
The following is a partial list of genes on human chromosome 7. For complete list, see the link in the infobox on the right.

- AASS: encoding enzyme Alpha-aminoadipic semialdehyde synthase, mitochondrial
- ACTR3B: actin-related protein 3B
- AEBP1: AE binding protein 1
- AGK: encoding enzyme mitochondrial acylglycerol kinase
- ARHGEF35: encoding protein Rho guanine nucleotide exchange factor (GEF) 35
- AVL9: encoding protein Avl9 cell migration associated
- BCAP29: B-cell receptor-associated protein 29
- BCC6: encoding protein basal cell carcinoma, susceptibility to, 6
- BRAT1: BRCA1-associated ATM activator 1
- C7orf25: protein UPF0415
- C7orf31: chromosome 7 open reading frame 31
- CALU: Calumenin
- CCL24: encoding protein C-C motif chemokine ligand 24
- CDCA7L: Cell division cycle-associated 7-like protein
- CFTR: anion channel membrane protein
- CNOT4: CCR4-NOT transcription complex, subunit 4
- CPED1: cadherin like and PC-esterase domain containing 1
- CPVL: carboxypeptidase, vitellogenic like
- CROT: Peroxisomal carnitine O-octanoyltransferase
- DDX56: DEAD-box helicase 56
- DMTF1: Cyclin D binding myb like transcription factor 1
- ECOP: EGFR-coamplified and overexpressed protein
- EEPD1: encoding protein Endonuclease/exonuclease/phosphatase family domain containing 1
- EGFR-AS1: encoding protein EGFR antisense RNA 1
- EZH2: encoding enzyme histone-lysine N-methyltransferase for histone h3 lysine 27
- FAM71F2: family with sequence similarity 71 member F2
- FAM185A: family with sequence similarity 185 member A
- FAM200A: family with sequence similarity 200 member A
- FBXO24: F-box only protein 24
- GBAS: Glioblastoma amplified sequence; Protein NipSnap homolog 2
- GET4: encoding protein GET4
- GLCCI1: Glucocorticoid-induced transcript 1 protein
- HOXA@: encoding protein Homeobox a cluster
- HOXA10-HOXA9: readthrough gene unlikely to produce a protein product
- HPC4: Prostate cancer, hereditary, 4
- ICA1: islet cell autoantigen 1
- ING3: inhibitor of growth protein 3
- INTS1: encoding protein Integrator complex subunit 1
- IQCE: IQ domain-containing protein E
- KDM7A: encoding protein Lysine demethylase 7A
- LCHN: protein encoded by the KIAA1147 gene
- LHFPL3: LHFPL tetraspan subfamily member 3
- LINC01003: encoding long intergenic non-protein coding RNA 1003
- LRRC17: leucine-rich repeat containing protein 17
- LRRC61: encoding protein Leucine rich repeat containing 61
- LRRD1: encoding protein Leucine-rich repeats and death domain containing 1
- LSM5: U6 small nuclear RNA and mRNA degradation associated
- LUC7L2: putative RNA-binding protein Luc7-like 2
- MACC1: encoding protein Macc1, met transcriptional regulator
- MAP11: encoding protein Microtubule-associated protein 11
- MDFIC: MyoD family inhibitor domain containing
- METTL2B: methyltransferase-like protein 2B
- MINDY4: MINDY lysine 48 deubiquitinase 4
- MIR93: encoding protein MicroRNA 93
- MIR148A: encoding protein MicroRNA 148a
- MIR196B: encoding protein MicroRNA 196b
- MIR548F4: encoding protein MicroRNA 548f-4
- MIR96: microRNA 96
- MOSPD3: motile sperm domain containing 3
- MTERF: mitochondrial transcription termination factor 1
- MTRNR2L6: encoding protein MT-RNR2-like 6
- NOM1: nucleolar protein with MIF4G domain 1
- NUDCD3: NudC domain-containing protein 3
- NUPL2: nucleoporin-like 2
- NXPH1: neurexophilin-1
- OPN1SW: blue-sensitive opsin
- PDAP1: PDGFA associated protein 1
- PHTF2: putative homeodomain transcription factor 2
- PLOD3: procollagen-lysine,2-oxoglutarate 5-dioxygenase 3
- POM121: POM121 transmembrane nucleoporin
- POP7: ribonuclease P protein subunit p20
- PPP1R17: protein phosphatase 1 regulatory subunit 17
- PSPH: phosphoserine phosphatase
- PURB: purine-rich element binding protein B
- PVRIG: encoding protein Poliovirus receptor related immunoglobulin domain containing
- RADIL: ras-associating and dilute domain-containing protein
- RASA4B: encoding protein RAS p21 protein activator 4B
- RCP9: DNA-directed RNA polymerase III subunit RCP9
- REPIN1: replication initiator 1
- RNF216-IT1: encoding protein RNF216 intronic transcript 1
- SCIN: scinderin
- SCRN1: secernin 1
- SEMA3E: encoding protein Semaphorin 3E
- SOSTDC1: sclerostin domain containing 1
- SPDYE1: speedy/RINGO cell cycle regulator family member E1
- SSC4D: scavenger receptor cysteine rich family member with 4 domains
- STEAP1: six transmembrane epithelial antigen of the prostate 1
- STEAP2: six transmembrane epithelial antigen of the prostate 2
- STEAP4: six transmembrane epithelial antigen of the prostate 4
- STYXL1: serine/threonine/tyrosine-interacting-like protein 1
- SUMF2: sulatase-modifying factor 2
- SYPL1: synaptophysin-like protein 1
- TARP: TCR gamma alternate reading frame protein
- TBRG4: transforming growth factor beta regulator 4
- TECPR1 encoding protein Tectonin beta-propeller repeat containing 1
- TMED4: transmembrane emp24 domain-containing protein 4
- TMEM130: transmembrane protein 130
- TMEM196 encoding protein Transmembrane protein 196
- TMEM243: encoding protein Transmembrane protein 243
- TNRC18: encoding protein Trinucleotide repeat containing 18
- TRBC1 encoding protein T cell receptor beta constant 1
- TRBC2 encoding protein T cell receptor beta constant 2
- TRGV1: encoding protein T cell receptor gamma variable 1 (non-functional)
- TRIL: TRL4 interactor with leucine rich repeats
- UPK3B: encoding protein Uroplakin 3B
- URG4: up-regulated gene 4
- WBSCR17: polypeptide N-acetylgalactosaminyltransferase 17
- WDR91 encoding protein WD repeat domain 91
- WEE2-AS1: encoding protein WEE2 antisense RNA 1
- XKR5: encoding protein XK, Kell blood group complex subunit-related family, member 5
- ZC3HAV1: zinc finger CCCH-type containing
- ZC3HC1: zinc finger C3HC-type containing 1
- ZNF106: encoding protein Zinc finger protein 106
- ZNF117: encoding protein Zinc finger protein 117
- ZNF394: zinc finger protein 394
- ZNF398: zinc finger protein 398
- ZNF679: encoding protein Zinc finger protein 679
- ZNF716: encoding protein Zinc finger protein 716
- ZNF727: encoding protein Zinc finger protein 727
- ZNF786: encoding protein Zinc finger protein 786
- ZNF853: encoding protein Zinc finger protein 853
- ZKSCAN1: zinc finger protein with KRAB and SCAN domains 1
- ZKSCAN5: zinc finger protein with KRAB and SCAN domains 5
- ZMIZ2: zinc finger MIZ domain-containing protein 2
- ZNF277P: zinc finger protein 277
- ZRF1: DnaJ heat shock protein family (Hsp40) member C2
- ZSCAN21: zinc finger and SCAN domain-containing protein 21

== Diseases and disorders ==
The following diseases are some of those related to genes on chromosome 7:

- 7p22.1 microduplication syndrome
- argininosuccinic aciduria
- cerebral cavernous malformation
- Charcot–Marie–Tooth disease
- Cholestasis, progressive familial intrahepatic 3
- Citrullinemia, type II, adult-onset,
- congenital bilateral absence of vas deferens
- cystic fibrosis
- Developmental verbal dyspraxia
- distal spinal muscular atrophy, type V
- Diaphanospondylodysostosis
- Ehlers–Danlos syndrome
- hemochromatosis, type 3
- Hereditary nonpolyposis colorectal cancer HNPCC4
- Lissencephaly syndrome, norman-roberts type
- Marfan syndrome
- maple syrup urine disease
- maturity onset diabetes of the young type 3
- mucopolysaccharidosis type VII or Sly syndrome
- Muscular dystrophy, limb-girdle, type 1D
- myelodysplastic syndrome
- Myotonia congenita
- nonsyndromic deafness
- O'Donnell-Luria–Rodan syndrome
- osteogenesis imperfecta
- p47-phox-deficient chronic granulomatous disease
- Pectus excavatum
- Pendred syndrome
- Romano–Ward syndrome
- Shwachman–Diamond syndrome
- Schizophrenia
- Silver-Russell syndrome
- Specific language impairment
- Tritanopia or tritanomaly color blindness
- Williams syndrome
- Zellweger syndrome

== Chromosomal disorders ==
The following conditions are caused by changes in the structure or number of copies of chromosome 7:

- Williams syndrome is caused by the deletion of genetic material from a portion of the long (q) arm of chromosome 7. The deleted region, which is located at position 11.23 (written as 7q11.23), is designated as the Williams syndrome critical region. This region includes more than 20 genes, and researchers believe that the characteristic features of Williams syndrome are probably related to the loss of multiple genes in this region.

While a few of the specific genes related to Williams syndrome have been identified, the relationship between most of the genes in the deleted region and the signs and symptoms of Williams syndrome is unknown.

- Other changes in the number or structure of chromosome 7 can cause delayed growth and development, mental disorder, characteristic facial features, skeletal abnormalities, delayed speech, and other medical problems. These changes include an extra copy of part of chromosome 7 in each cell (partial trisomy 7) or a missing segment of the chromosome in each cell (partial monosomy 7). In some cases, several DNA building blocks (nucleotides) are deleted or duplicated in part of chromosome 7. A circular structure called ring chromosome 7 is also possible. A ring chromosome occurs when both ends of a broken chromosome are reunited.

== Cytogenetic band ==
G-banding ideograms of human chromosome 7

G-banding ideogram of human chromosome 7 in resolution 850 bphs. Band length in this diagram is proportional to base-pair length. This type of ideogram is generally used in genome browsers (e.g. Ensembl, UCSC Genome Browser).

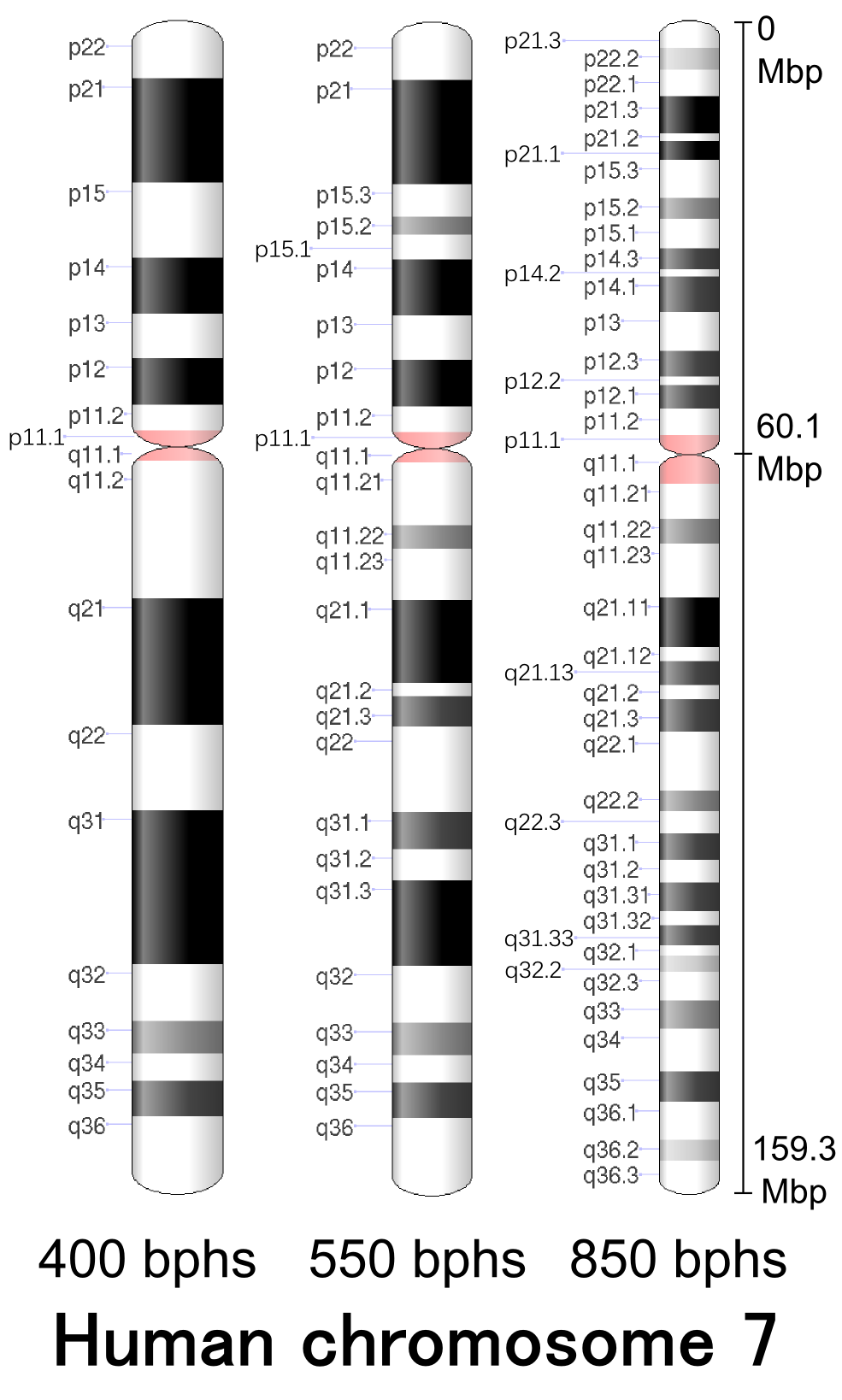
G-banding patterns of human chromosome 7 in three different resolutions (400, 550 and 850). Band length in this diagram is based on the ideograms from ISCN (2013). This type of ideogram represents actual relative band length observed under a microscope at the different moments during the mitotic process.

G-bands of human chromosome 7 in resolution 850 bphs
Chr.	Arm	Band	ISCN start	ISCN stop	Basepair start	Basepair stop	Stain	Density
7	p	22.3	0	227	1	2,800,000	gneg	
7	p	22.2	227	397	2,800,001	4,500,000	gpos	25
7	p	22.1	397	610	4,500,001	7,200,000	gneg	
7	p	21.3	610	908	7,200,001	13,700,000	gpos	100
7	p	21.2	908	965	13,700,001	16,500,000	gneg	
7	p	21.1	965	1121	16,500,001	20,900,000	gpos	100
7	p	15.3	1121	1419	20,900,001	25,500,000	gneg	
7	p	15.2	1419	1589	25,500,001	27,900,000	gpos	50
7	p	15.1	1589	1816	27,900,001	28,800,000	gneg	
7	p	14.3	1816	1986	28,800,001	34,900,000	gpos	75
7	p	14.2	1986	2043	34,900,001	37,100,000	gneg	
7	p	14.1	2043	2327	37,100,001	43,300,000	gpos	75
7	p	13	2327	2639	43,300,001	45,400,000	gneg	
7	p	12.3	2639	2838	45,400,001	49,000,000	gpos	75
7	p	12.2	2838	2909	49,000,001	50,500,000	gneg	
7	p	12.1	2909	3093	50,500,001	53,900,000	gpos	75
7	p	11.2	3093	3306	53,900,001	58,100,000	gneg	
7	p	11.1	3306	3448	58,100,001	60,100,000	acen	
7	q	11.1	3448	3689	60,100,001	62,100,000	acen	
7	q	11.21	3689	3973	62,100,001	67,500,000	gneg	
7	q	11.22	3973	4171	67,500,001	72,700,000	gpos	50
7	q	11.23	4171	4597	72,700,001	77,900,000	gneg	
7	q	21.11	4597	4994	77,900,001	86,700,000	gpos	100
7	q	21.12	4994	5108	86,700,001	88,500,000	gneg	
7	q	21.13	5108	5292	88,500,001	91,500,000	gpos	75
7	q	21.2	5292	5406	91,500,001	93,300,000	gneg	
7	q	21.3	5406	5661	93,300,001	98,400,000	gpos	75
7	q	22.1	5661	6129	98,400,001	104,200,000	gneg	
7	q	22.2	6129	6300	104,200,001	104,900,000	gpos	50
7	q	22.3	6300	6470	104,900,001	107,800,000	gneg	
7	q	31.1	6470	6683	107,800,001	115,000,000	gpos	75
7	q	31.2	6683	6867	115,000,001	117,700,000	gneg	
7	q	31.31	6867	7094	117,700,001	121,400,000	gpos	75
7	q	31.32	7094	7208	121,400,001	124,100,000	gneg	
7	q	31.33	7208	7364	124,100,001	127,500,000	gpos	75
7	q	32.1	7364	7449	127,500,001	129,600,000	gneg	
7	q	32.2	7449	7576	129,600,001	130,800,000	gpos	25
7	q	32.3	7576	7803	130,800,001	132,900,000	gneg	
7	q	33	7803	8031	132,900,001	138,500,000	gpos	50
7	q	34	8031	8371	138,500,001	143,400,000	gneg	
7	q	35	8371	8612	143,400,001	148,200,000	gpos	75
7	q	36.1	8612	8910	148,200,001	152,800,000	gneg	
7	q	36.2	8910	9080	152,800,001	155,200,000	gpos	25
7	q	36.3	9080	9350	155,200,001	159,345,973	gneg	

== In popular culture ==
=== Novels ===
In the novel Performance Anomalies, researchers at Stanford University identify mutations in the long (q) arm of chromosome 7 as underlying the accelerated nervous system of the spy protagonist Cono, who receives the moniker Cono 7Q
