= IQC =

IQC may refer to:

- Institute for Quantum Computing, University of Waterloo, Waterloo, Ontario, Canada
- Instituto Questão de Ciência, a Brazilian non-profit organization
- International Quizzing Championships, a multi-disciplinary quiz event
- Itaquaquecetuba (CPTM) (station code: IQC), a train station in Itaquaquecetuba, São Paulo, Brazil

== See also ==
- IQCE, IQ domain-containing protein E
