= T cell receptor beta constant 2 =

Gene in the species Homo sapiens

TRBC2

Identifiers
- Aliases: TRBC2, TCRBC2, T cell receptor beta constant 2
- External IDs: OMIM: 615445; GeneCards: TRBC2; OMA:TRBC2 - orthologs

Gene location (Human)
Chr.	Chromosome 7 (human)
Band	7q34	Start	142,801,041 bp
Band	7q34	End	142,802,748 bp
RNA expression pattern
Bgee	Human / Mouse (ortholog); Top expressed in: granulocyte; lymph node; appendix; spleen; blood; gallbladder; duodenum; mucosa of transverse colon; primary visual cortex; rectum / n/a; More reference expression data
BioGPS	n/a
Orthologs
Species	Human	Mouse
Entrez	28638	n/a
Ensembl	ENSG00000211772	n/a
UniProt	n a	n/a
RefSeq (mRNA)	n/a	n/a
RefSeq (protein)	n/a	n/a
Location (UCSC)	Chr 7: 142.8 – 142.8 Mb	n/a
PubMed search		n/a
- Wikidata
View/Edit Human

T cell receptor beta constant 2 is a protein that in humans is encoded by the TRBC2 gene.
