= METTL2B =

Protein-coding gene in the species Homo sapiens

Identifiers
- Aliases: METTL2B, METL, METTL2, METTL2A, PSENIP1, methyltransferase like 2B, methyltransferase 2B, methylcytidine
- External IDs: OMIM: 607846; MGI: 1289171; GeneCards: METTL2B

Gene location (Human)
Chr.	Chromosome 7 (human)
Band	7q32.1	Start	128,476,729 bp
Band	7q32.1	End	128,506,602 bp

Gene location (Mouse)
Chr.	Chromosome 11 (mouse)
Band	11 E1|11 68.61 cM	Start	105,017,251 bp
Band	11 E1|11 68.61 cM	End	105,031,220 bp
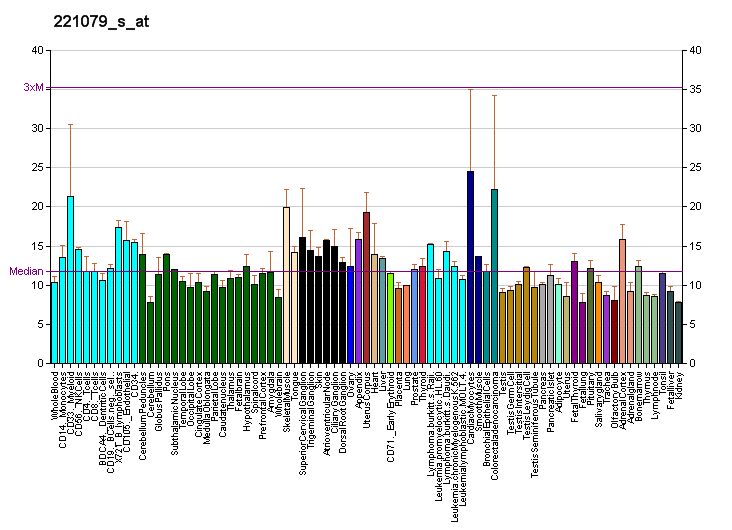
RNA expression pattern
Bgee	Human / Mouse (ortholog); Top expressed in: epithelium of colon; cerebellar vermis; islet of Langerhans; quadriceps femoris muscle; skeletal muscle tissue; gonad; endometrium; tonsil; stromal cell of endometrium; muscle of thigh / Top expressed in: otic vesicle; hand; spermatocyte; tail of embryo; epiblast; Rostral migratory stream; abdominal wall; primitive streak; embryo; ventricular zone; More reference expression data
BioGPS	More reference expression data
Orthologs
Databases	NCBI: entry; OMA: entry
Species	Human	Mouse
Entrez	55798	52686
Ensembl	ENSG00000165055	ENSMUSG00000020691
UniProt	Q6P1Q9	Q8BMK1
RefSeq (mRNA)	NM_018396	NM_172567
RefSeq (protein)	NP_060866	NP_766155
Location (UCSC)	Chr 7: 128.48 – 128.51 Mb	Chr 11: 105.02 – 105.03 Mb
PubMed search
- Wikidata
View/Edit Human	View/Edit Mouse

Methyltransferase-like protein 2B is an enzyme that in humans is encoded by the METTL2B gene.

This gene is a member of a family of methyltransferases that share homology with, but are distinct from, the UbiE family of methyltransferases. Alternatively spliced variants which encode different protein isoforms have been described; however, not all variants have been fully characterized.
