= Leucine-rich repeats and death domain containing 1 =

Protein-coding gene in the species Homo sapiens

LRRD1

Identifiers
- Aliases: LRRD1, leucine rich repeats and death domain containing 1
- External IDs: MGI: 3045299; HomoloGene: 18247; GeneCards: LRRD1; OMA:LRRD1 - orthologs

Gene location (Human)
Chr.	Chromosome 7 (human)
Band	7q21.2	Start	92,141,643 bp
Band	7q21.2	End	92,179,531 bp

Gene location (Mouse)
Chr.	Chromosome 5 (mouse)
Band	5|5 A1	Start	3,895,173 bp
Band	5|5 A1	End	3,916,596 bp
RNA expression pattern
Bgee	Human / Mouse (ortholog); Top expressed in: testicle; left testis; right testis; cerebellar cortex; cerebellar hemisphere; ganglionic eminence; right hemisphere of cerebellum; ventricular zone; endometrium; hypothalamus / Top expressed in: spermatid; testicle; spermatocyte; ventricular zone; adrenal gland; cerebellum; ileum; hypothalamus; striatum of neuraxis; islet of Langerhans; More reference expression data
BioGPS	n/a
Orthologs
Species	Human	Mouse
Entrez	401387	242838
Ensembl	ENSG00000240720	ENSMUSG00000040367
UniProt	A4D1F6	Q8C0R9
RefSeq (mRNA)	NM_001161528; NM_001045475; NM_001384932; NM_001384933; NM_001384934	NM_172879
RefSeq (protein)	NP_001155000	NP_766467
Location (UCSC)	Chr 7: 92.14 – 92.18 Mb	Chr 5: 3.9 – 3.92 Mb
PubMed search
- Wikidata
View/Edit Human	View/Edit Mouse

Leucine-rich repeats and death domain containing 1 is a protein that in humans is encoded by the LRRD1 gene.
