= Zinc finger protein 117 =

Protein found in humans

ZNF117

Identifiers
- Aliases: ZNF117, H-plk, HPF9, zinc finger protein 117
- External IDs: OMIM: 194624; GeneCards: ZNF117

Gene location (Human)
Chr.	Chromosome 7 (human)
Band	7q11.21	Start	64,971,772 bp
Band	7q11.21	End	65,006,684 bp
RNA expression pattern
Bgee	Human / Mouse (ortholog); Top expressed in: frontal pole; paraflocculus of cerebellum; buccal mucosa cell; middle frontal gyrus; Brodmann area 10; right adrenal cortex; left adrenal gland; left adrenal cortex; adipose tissue; ganglionic eminence / n/a; More reference expression data
BioGPS	n/a
Gene ontology
Molecular function	DNA-binding transcription factor activity; DNA binding; zinc ion binding; metal ion binding; nucleic acid binding; DNA-binding transcription factor activity, RNA polymerase II-specific
Cellular component	nucleus
Biological process	transcription, DNA-templated; regulation of transcription, DNA-templated; regulation of transcription by RNA polymerase II
Sources:Amigo / QuickGO
Orthologs
Databases	NCBI: entry; OMA: entry
Species	Human	Mouse
Entrez	51351	n/a
Ensembl	ENSG00000152926	n/a
UniProt	Q03924	n/a
RefSeq (mRNA)	NM_015852	n/a
RefSeq (protein)	NP_056936	n/a
Location (UCSC)	Chr 7: 64.97 – 65.01 Mb	n/a
PubMed search		n/a
- Wikidata
View/Edit Human

Zinc finger protein 117 is a protein that in humans is encoded by the ZNF117 gene.
