= RASA4B =

Protein-coding gene in the species Homo sapiens

Identifiers
- Aliases: RASA4B, RAS p21 protein activator 4B
- External IDs: MGI: 1858600; GeneCards: RASA4B

Gene location (Human)
Chr.	Chromosome 7 (human)
Band	7q22.1	Start	102,479,976 bp
Band	7q22.1	End	102,517,777 bp

Gene location (Mouse)
Chr.	Chromosome 5 (mouse)
Band	5|5 G2	Start	136,083,916 bp
Band	5|5 G2	End	136,111,860 bp
RNA expression pattern
Bgee	Human / Mouse (ortholog); Top expressed in: muscle of thigh; gastrocnemius muscle; skeletal muscle tissue; pituitary gland; right coronary artery; canal of the cervix; gastric mucosa; fundus; body of uterus; anterior pituitary / Top expressed in: primary oocyte; Ileal epithelium; zygote; muscle of thigh; secondary oocyte; plantaris muscle; neural layer of retina; extensor digitorum longus muscle; stroma of bone marrow; ankle joint; More reference expression data
BioGPS	n/a
Gene ontology
Molecular function	metal ion binding; GTPase activator activity; phospholipid binding
Cellular component	cytoplasm; cytosol; plasma membrane; intrinsic component of the cytoplasmic side of the plasma membrane; membrane
Biological process	regulation of GTPase activity; intracellular signal transduction; signal transduction; positive regulation of GTPase activity; negative regulation of Ras protein signal transduction; cellular response to calcium ion
Sources:Amigo / QuickGO
Orthologs
Databases	NCBI: entry; OMA: entry
Species	Human	Mouse
Entrez	100271927	54153
Ensembl	ENSG00000170667	ENSMUSG00000004952
UniProt	C9J798	Q6PFQ7
RefSeq (mRNA)	NM_001277335; NM_001367767	NM_001039103; NM_133914
RefSeq (protein)	NP_001264264; NP_001354696	NP_001034192; NP_598675
Location (UCSC)	Chr 7: 102.48 – 102.52 Mb	Chr 5: 136.08 – 136.11 Mb
PubMed search
- Wikidata
View/Edit Human	View/Edit Mouse

RAS p21 protein activator 4B is a protein that in humans is encoded by the RASA4B gene.
