= WEE2-AS1 =

Non-coding RNA in humans

Identifiers
- Aliases: WEE2-AS1, WEE2 antisense RNA 1
- External IDs: GeneCards: WEE2-AS1; OMA:WEE2-AS1 - orthologs

Gene location (Human)
Chr.	Chromosome 7 (human)
Band	7q34	Start	141,704,003 bp
Band	7q34	End	141,738,346 bp
RNA expression pattern
Bgee	Human / Mouse (ortholog); Top expressed in: right uterine tube; gonad; testicle; sural nerve; olfactory zone of nasal mucosa; endometrium; Achilles tendon; ventricular zone; body of pancreas; lymph node / n/a; More reference expression data
BioGPS	n/a
Orthologs
Species	Human	Mouse
Entrez	285962	n/a
Ensembl	ENSG00000228775; ENSG00000261994	n/a
UniProt	n a	n/a
RefSeq (mRNA)	NM_173677	n/a
RefSeq (protein)	n/a	n/a
Location (UCSC)	Chr 7: 141.7 – 141.74 Mb	n/a
PubMed search		n/a
- Wikidata
View/Edit Human

WEE2 antisense RNA 1 is a protein that in humans is encoded by the WEE2-AS1 gene.
