= Zinc finger protein 679 =

Protein found in humans

ZNF679

Identifiers
- Aliases: ZNF679, zinc finger protein 679
- External IDs: GeneCards: ZNF679

Gene location (Human)
Chr.	Chromosome 7 (human)
Band	7q11.21	Start	64,228,474 bp
Band	7q11.21	End	64,266,931 bp
RNA expression pattern
Bgee	Human / Mouse (ortholog); Top expressed in: testicle; right testis; left testis; ventricular zone / n/a; More reference expression data
BioGPS	n/a
Gene ontology
Molecular function	DNA binding; protein binding; metal ion binding; nucleic acid binding; DNA-binding transcription factor activity, RNA polymerase II-specific
Cellular component	intracellular anatomical structure; nucleus
Biological process	transcription, DNA-templated; regulation of transcription, DNA-templated; regulation of transcription by RNA polymerase II
Sources:Amigo / QuickGO
Orthologs
Databases	NCBI: entry; OMA: entry
Species	Human	Mouse
Entrez	168417	n/a
Ensembl	ENSG00000197123	n/a
UniProt	Q8IYX0	n/a
RefSeq (mRNA)	NM_153363	n/a
RefSeq (protein)	NP_699194	n/a
Location (UCSC)	Chr 7: 64.23 – 64.27 Mb	n/a
PubMed search		n/a
- Wikidata
View/Edit Human

Zinc finger protein 679 is a protein that in humans is encoded by the ZNF679 gene.
