= PVRIG =

Protein-coding gene in the species Homo sapiens

Identifiers
- Aliases: PVRIG, C7orf15, poliovirus receptor related immunoglobulin domain containing, CD112R, PVR related immunoglobulin domain containing
- External IDs: OMIM: 617012; MGI: 5596028; HomoloGene: 78229; GeneCards: PVRIG; OMA:PVRIG - orthologs

Gene location (Human)
Chr.	Chromosome 7 (human)
Band	7q22.1	Start	100,218,241 bp
Band	7q22.1	End	100,221,490 bp

Gene location (Mouse)
Chr.	Chromosome 5 (mouse)
Band	5 G2|5	Start	138,340,223 bp
Band	5 G2|5	End	138,341,819 bp
RNA expression pattern
Bgee	Human / Mouse (ortholog); Top expressed in: granulocyte; blood; gonad; spleen; skeletal muscle tissue; lymph node; testicle; gastrocnemius muscle; muscle of thigh; appendix / Top expressed in: blastocyst; embryo; jejunum; spleen; ileum; spermatocyte; liver; thymus; duodenum; colon; More reference expression data
BioGPS	n/a
Gene ontology
Molecular function	protein binding; phosphatase binding; signaling receptor activity
Cellular component	membrane; integral component of membrane; plasma membrane
Biological process	negative regulation of T cell receptor signaling pathway; signal transduction
Sources:Amigo / QuickGO
Orthologs
Species	Human	Mouse
Entrez	79037	102640920
Ensembl	ENSG00000213413	ENSMUSG00000109713
UniProt	Q6DKI7	A0A1B0GS01
RefSeq (mRNA)	NM_024070; NM_001387134; NM_001397246	NM_001378438
RefSeq (protein)	NP_076975	NP_001365367
Location (UCSC)	Chr 7: 100.22 – 100.22 Mb	Chr 5: 138.34 – 138.34 Mb
PubMed search
- Wikidata
View/Edit Human	View/Edit Mouse

Poliovirus receptor related immunoglobulin domain containing is a protein that in humans is encoded by the PVRIG gene.
