= Long intergenic non-protein coding RNA 1003 =

Non-coding RNA in the species Homo sapiens

LINC01003

Identifiers
- Aliases: LINC01003, long intergenic non-protein coding RNA 1003
- External IDs: GeneCards: LINC01003

Gene location (Human)
Chr.	Chromosome 7 (human)
Band	7q36.1	Start	152,463,786 bp
Band	7q36.1	End	152,465,549 bp
RNA expression pattern
Bgee	Human / Mouse (ortholog); Top expressed in: endothelial cell; vastus lateralis muscle; retinal pigment epithelium; corpus epididymis; biceps brachii; tibialis anterior muscle; parotid gland; gonad; mucosa of ileum; Skeletal muscle tissue of biceps brachii / n/a; More reference expression data
BioGPS	n/a
Orthologs
Databases	NCBI: entry; OMA: entry
Species	Human	Mouse
Entrez	100128822	n/a
Ensembl	ENSG00000261455	n/a
UniProt	n a	n/a
RefSeq (mRNA)	n/a	n/a
RefSeq (protein)	n/a	n/a
Location (UCSC)	Chr 7: 152.46 – 152.47 Mb	n/a
PubMed search		n/a
- Wikidata
View/Edit Human

Long intergenic non-protein coding RNA 1003 is a non-coding RNA that in humans is encoded by the LINC01003 gene.
