= SYPL1 =

Protein-coding gene in the species Homo sapiens

Identifiers
- Aliases: SYPL1, H-SP1, SYPL, synaptophysin like 1
- External IDs: OMIM: 616665; MGI: 108081; GeneCards: SYPL1

Gene location (Human)
Chr.	Chromosome 7 (human)
Band	7q22.3	Start	106,090,503 bp
Band	7q22.3	End	106,112,576 bp

Gene location (Mouse)
Chr.	Chromosome 12 (mouse)
Band	12 A3|12 13.87 cM	Start	33,003,890 bp
Band	12 A3|12 13.87 cM	End	33,029,859 bp
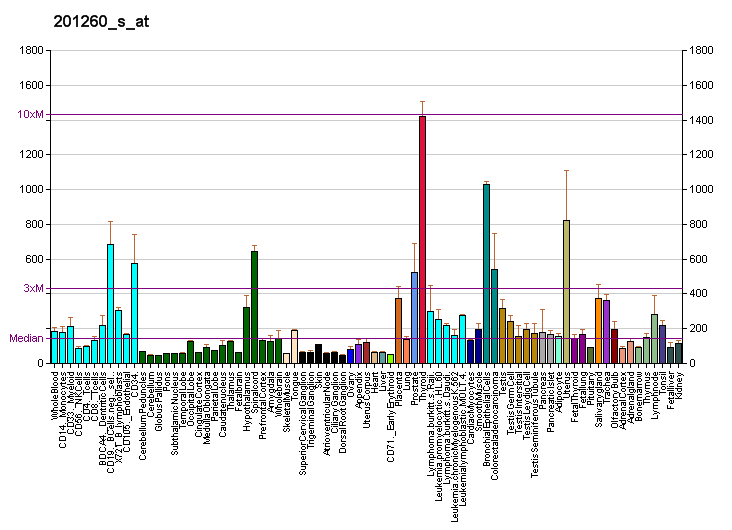

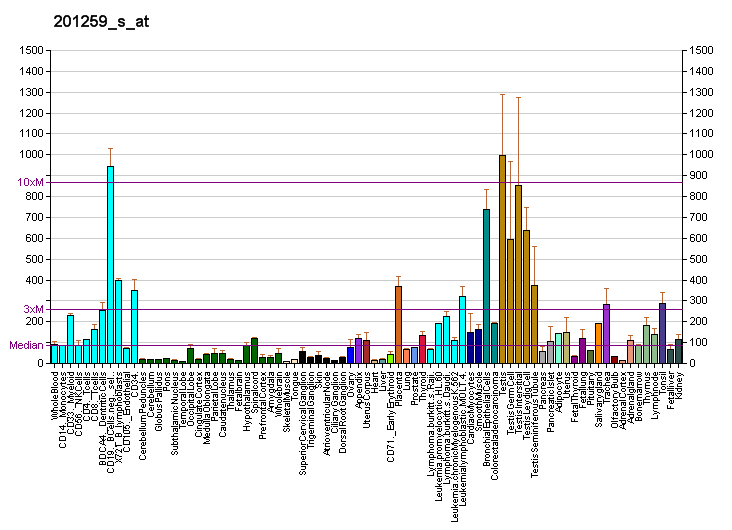
RNA expression pattern
Bgee	Human / Mouse (ortholog); Top expressed in: epithelium of nasopharynx; C1 segment; germinal epithelium; mucosa of paranasal sinus; olfactory zone of nasal mucosa; parotid gland; gingival epithelium; minor salivary glands; mucosa of pharynx; oral cavity / Top expressed in: spermatid; conjunctival fornix; corneal stroma; ascending aorta; parotid gland; crypt of lieberkuhn of small intestine; aortic valve; seminal vesicula; transitional epithelium of urinary bladder; triceps brachii muscle; More reference expression data
BioGPS	More reference expression data
Gene ontology
Molecular function	transporter activity; syntaxin-1 binding
Cellular component	synaptic vesicle; secretory granule; cytoplasmic vesicle membrane; membrane; melanosome; cytoplasmic vesicle; integral component of synaptic vesicle membrane; integral component of membrane; integral component of plasma membrane; extracellular exosome; synaptic vesicle membrane
Biological process	chemical synaptic transmission; transport
Sources:Amigo / QuickGO
Orthologs
Databases	NCBI: entry; OMA: entry
Species	Human	Mouse
Entrez	6856	19027
Ensembl	ENSG00000008282	ENSMUSG00000020570
UniProt	Q16563	O09117
RefSeq (mRNA)	NM_006754; NM_182715	NM_013635; NM_198710
RefSeq (protein)	NP_006745; NP_874384; NP_001368839; NP_001368840; NP_001368841 NP_001368842; NP_001368844; NP_001368845; NP_001368846; NP_001368847; NP_001368848; NP_001368849; NP_001368850	NP_038663; NP_942003
Location (UCSC)	Chr 7: 106.09 – 106.11 Mb	Chr 12: 33 – 33.03 Mb
PubMed search
- Wikidata
View/Edit Human	View/Edit Mouse

Synaptophysin-like protein 1 is a protein that in humans is encoded by the SYPL1 gene.
