= EGFR-AS1 =

Non-coding RNA in humans

Identifiers
- Aliases: EGFR-AS1, EGFR antisense RNA 1
- External IDs: GeneCards: EGFR-AS1

Gene location (Human)
Chr.	Chromosome 7 (human)
Band	7p11.2	Start	55,179,750 bp
Band	7p11.2	End	55,188,934 bp
RNA expression pattern
Bgee	Human / Mouse (ortholog); Top expressed in: gonad; thymus; placenta; duodenum; skeletal muscle tissue; tonsil; sural nerve; liver; skin of leg; muscle of thigh / n/a; More reference expression data
BioGPS	n/a
Orthologs
Databases	NCBI: entry; OMA: entry
Species	Human	Mouse
Entrez	100507500	n/a
Ensembl	ENSG00000224057	n/a
UniProt	n a	n/a
RefSeq (mRNA)	n/a	n/a
RefSeq (protein)	n/a	n/a
Location (UCSC)	Chr 7: 55.18 – 55.19 Mb	n/a
PubMed search		n/a
- Wikidata
View/Edit Human

EGFR antisense RNA 1 is a non-coding RNA that in humans is encoded by the EGFR-AS1 gene.
