= BCAP29 =

Protein-coding gene in humans

Available structures
PDB	Ortholog search: PDBe RCSB
PDB	List of PDB id codes 4W7Y, 4W7Z, 4W80

Identifiers
- Aliases: BCAP29, BAP29, B-cell receptor-associated protein 29, B-cell receptor associated protein 29, B cell receptor associated protein 29
- External IDs: MGI: 101917; HomoloGene: 22411; GeneCards: BCAP29; OMA:BCAP29 - orthologs

Gene location (Human)
Chr.	Chromosome 7 (human)
Band	7q22.3	Start	107,579,977 bp
Band	7q22.3	End	107,629,170 bp

Gene location (Mouse)
Chr.	Chromosome 12 (mouse)
Band	12 A2- A3|12 13.63 cM	Start	31,640,966 bp
Band	12 A2- A3|12 13.63 cM	End	31,684,657 bp
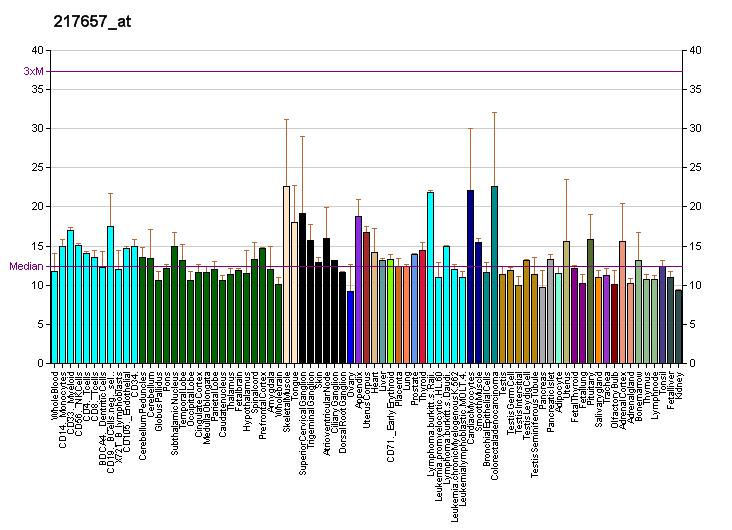

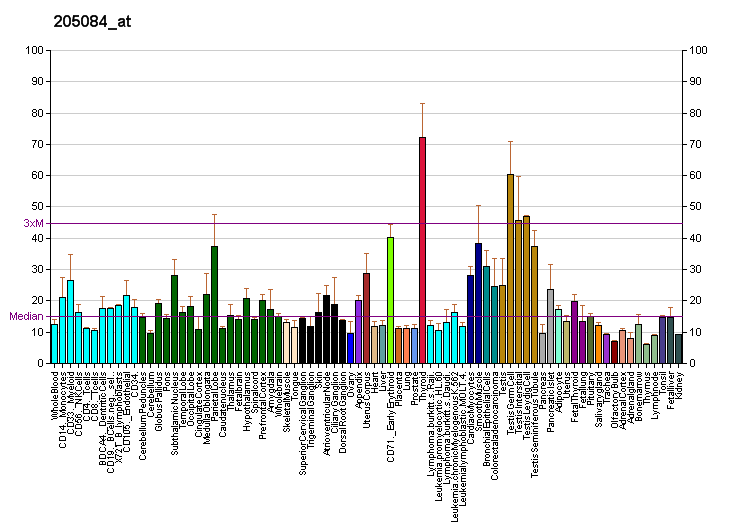
RNA expression pattern
Bgee	Human / Mouse (ortholog); Top expressed in: Achilles tendon; smooth muscle tissue; right lobe of thyroid gland; ascending aorta; left lobe of thyroid gland; islet of Langerhans; Descending thoracic aorta; rectum; left testis; right testis / Top expressed in: spermatocyte; spermatid; seminiferous tubule; cardiac muscle tissue of left ventricle; ciliary body; Paneth cell; substantia nigra; superior cervical ganglion; Epithelium of choroid plexus; atrioventricular valve; More reference expression data
BioGPS	More reference expression data
Orthologs
Species	Human	Mouse
Entrez	55973	12033
Ensembl	ENSG00000283852; ENSG00000075790	ENSMUSG00000020650
UniProt	Q9UHQ4	Q61334
RefSeq (mRNA)	NM_001008405; NM_001008406; NM_001008407; NM_018844; NM_001363482 NM_001363483	NM_001164090; NM_007530
RefSeq (protein)	NP_001008405; NP_061332; NP_001350411; NP_001350412; NP_001358282 NP_001358283; NP_001358284; NP_001358285; NP_001358286; NP_001008405.1; NP_061332.2	NP_001157562; NP_031556
Location (UCSC)	Chr 7: 107.58 – 107.63 Mb	Chr 12: 31.64 – 31.68 Mb
PubMed search
- Wikidata
View/Edit Human	View/Edit Mouse

B-cell receptor-associated protein 29 is a protein that in humans is encoded by the BCAP29 gene.
