= KDM7A =

Protein-coding gene in the species Homo sapiens

Identifiers
- Aliases: KDM7A, JHDM1D, lysine demethylase 7A
- External IDs: MGI: 2443388; GeneCards: KDM7A
Available structures
PDB	Ortholog search: PDBe RCSB
PDB	List of PDB id codes 3KV5, 3KV6, 3KV9, 3KVA, 3KVB, 3U78
Enzyme activity
EC #	BRENDA	ExPASy	KEGG	MetaCyc
1.14.11.65	↗	↗	↗	↗

Gene location (Human)
Chr.	Chromosome 7 (human)
Band	7q34	Start	140,084,746 bp
Band	7q34	End	140,176,983 bp

Gene location (Mouse)
Chr.	Chromosome 6 (mouse)
Band	6|6 B1	Start	39,113,557 bp
Band	6|6 B1	End	39,183,723 bp
RNA expression pattern
Bgee	Human / Mouse (ortholog); Top expressed in: cartilage tissue; tendon of biceps brachii; glutes; bone marrow; skin of thigh; epithelium of nasopharynx; monocyte; buccal mucosa cell; skin of hip; bone marrow cell / Top expressed in: blood; zygote; granulocyte; Rostral migratory stream; vestibular sensory epithelium; secondary oocyte; left lung lobe; mesenteric lymph nodes; lobe of cerebellum; cerebellar vermis; More reference expression data
BioGPS	n/a
Gene ontology
Molecular function	2-oxoglutarate-dependent dioxygenase activity; iron ion binding; histone H3-methyl-lysine-9 demethylase activity; histone H4-methyl-lysine-20 demethylase activity; dioxygenase activity; metal ion binding; methylated histone binding; histone H3-methyl-lysine-36 demethylase activity; oxidoreductase activity; histone H3-tri/di-methyl-lysine-27 demethylase activity; histone demethylase activity; zinc ion binding
Cellular component	nucleoplasm; nucleolus; nucleus
Biological process	regulation of transcription, DNA-templated; histone H3-K27 demethylation; histone H3-K9 demethylation; histone H4-K20 demethylation; transcription, DNA-templated; nervous system development; positive regulation of transcription, DNA-templated; histone H3-K36 demethylation; midbrain development; chromatin organization
Sources:Amigo / QuickGO
Orthologs
Databases	NCBI: entry; OMA: entry
Species	Human	Mouse
Entrez	80853	338523
Ensembl	ENSG00000006459	ENSMUSG00000042599
UniProt	Q6ZMT4	Q3UWM4
RefSeq (mRNA)	NM_030647	NM_001033430
RefSeq (protein)	NP_085150	NP_001028602
Location (UCSC)	Chr 7: 140.08 – 140.18 Mb	Chr 6: 39.11 – 39.18 Mb
PubMed search
- Wikidata
View/Edit Human	View/Edit Mouse

Lysine demethylase 7A is a protein that in humans is encoded by the KDM7A gene.
