= MicroRNA 93 =

Non-coding RNA in the species Homo sapiens

MIR93

Identifiers
- Aliases: MIR93, MIRN9, MIRN93, hsa-mir-93, miR-93, microRNA 93
- External IDs: OMIM: 612984; GeneCards: MIR93; OMA:MIR93 - orthologs

Gene location (Human)
Chr.	Chromosome 7 (human)
Band	7q22.1	Start	100,093,768 bp
Band	7q22.1	End	100,093,847 bp
RNA expression pattern
Bgee	Human / Mouse (ortholog); Top expressed in: bone marrow; skeletal muscle tissue; granulocyte; endometrium; gonad; sural nerve; blood; rectum; lymph node; placenta / n/a; More reference expression data
BioGPS	n/a
Orthologs
Species	Human	Mouse
Entrez	407050	n/a
Ensembl	ENSG00000207757	n/a
UniProt	n a	n/a
RefSeq (mRNA)	n/a	n/a
RefSeq (protein)	n/a	n/a
Location (UCSC)	Chr 7: 100.09 – 100.09 Mb	n/a
PubMed search		n/a
- Wikidata
View/Edit Human

MicroRNA 93 is a functional RNA and a microRNA that in humans is encoded by the MIR93 gene.

== Function ==
The primary transcript is cleaved by the Drosha ribonuclease III enzyme to produce an approximately 70 nucleotide long stem-loop precursor miRNA (pre-miRNA), which is further cleaved by the cytoplasmic Dicer ribonuclease to generate the mature miRNA and antisense miRNA star (miRNA*) products. The mature miRNA is incorporated into a RNA-induced silencing complex (RISC), which recognizes target messenger RNAs (mRNA) through imperfect base pairing with the miRNA and most commonly results in translational inhibition or destabilization of the target mRNA. The RefSeq represents the predicted microRNA stem-loop.
