= Zinc finger protein 716 =

Protein found in humans

ZNF716

Identifiers
- Aliases: ZNF716, zinc finger protein 716
- External IDs: GeneCards: ZNF716

Gene location (Human)
Chr.	Chromosome 7 (human)
Band	7p11.2	Start	57,450,177 bp
Band	7p11.2	End	57,473,559 bp
RNA expression pattern
Bgee	Human / Mouse (ortholog); Top expressed in: gonad; testicle; renal cortex / n/a; More reference expression data
BioGPS	n/a
Gene ontology
Molecular function	DNA binding; metal ion binding; nucleic acid binding; DNA-binding transcription factor activity, RNA polymerase II-specific
Cellular component	intracellular anatomical structure; nucleus
Biological process	transcription, DNA-templated; regulation of transcription, DNA-templated; regulation of transcription by RNA polymerase II
Sources:Amigo / QuickGO
Orthologs
Databases	NCBI: entry; OMA: entry
Species	Human	Mouse
Entrez	441234	n/a
Ensembl	ENSG00000182111	n/a
UniProt	A6NP11	n/a
RefSeq (mRNA)	NM_001159279	n/a
RefSeq (protein)	NP_001152751	n/a
Location (UCSC)	Chr 7: 57.45 – 57.47 Mb	n/a
PubMed search		n/a
- Wikidata
View/Edit Human

Zinc finger protein 716 is a protein that in humans is encoded by the ZNF716 gene.
