= LUC7L2 =

Protein-coding gene in the species Homo sapiens

Identifiers
- Aliases: LUC7L2, CGI-74, LUC7B2, CGI-59, LUC7-like 2 pre-mRNA splicing factor, LUC7 like 2, pre-mRNA splicing factor
- External IDs: OMIM: 613056; MGI: 2183260; HomoloGene: 56737; GeneCards: LUC7L2; OMA:LUC7L2 - orthologs

Gene location (Human)
Chr.	Chromosome 7 (human)
Band	7q34	Start	139,340,359 bp
Band	7q34	End	139,423,457 bp

Gene location (Mouse)
Chr.	Chromosome 6 (mouse)
Band	6|6 B1	Start	38,551,334 bp
Band	6|6 B1	End	38,609,470 bp
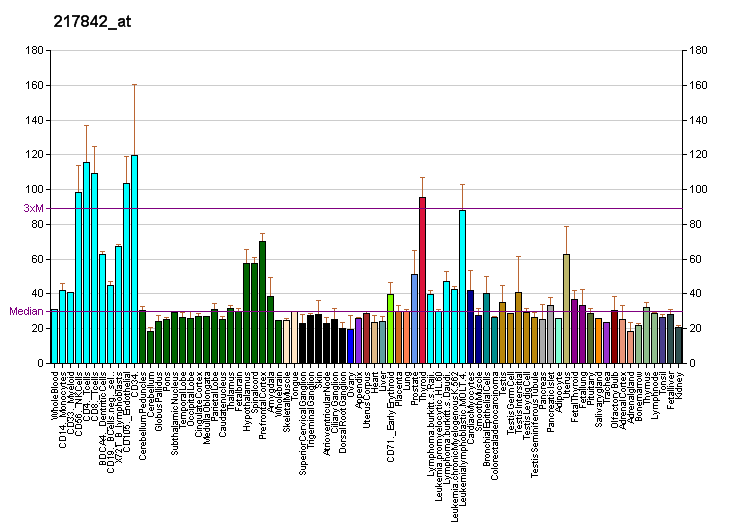

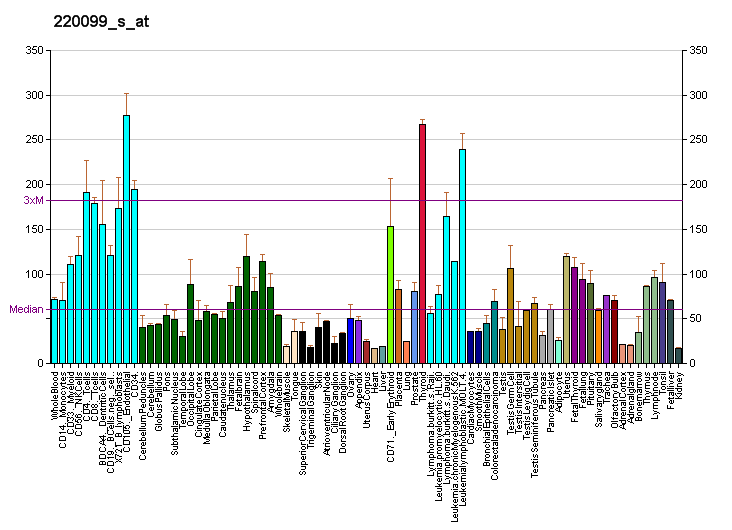
RNA expression pattern
Bgee	Human / Mouse (ortholog); Top expressed in: sural nerve; left lobe of thyroid gland; right lobe of thyroid gland; right uterine tube; gastric mucosa; Achilles tendon; canal of the cervix; ventricular zone; left uterine tube; Descending thoracic aorta / Top expressed in: mammillary body; ventromedial nucleus; lateral septal nucleus; body of femur; aortic valve; anterior amygdaloid area; cerebellar vermis; lateral geniculate nucleus; ascending aorta; lobe of cerebellum; More reference expression data
BioGPS	More reference expression data
Gene ontology
Molecular function	enzyme binding; protein binding; mRNA binding; RNA binding
Cellular component	U1 snRNP; nuclear speck; U2-type prespliceosome; nucleus; nucleoplasm
Biological process	mRNA splice site selection
Sources:Amigo / QuickGO
Orthologs
Species	Human	Mouse
Entrez	51631	192196
Ensembl	ENSG00000146963	ENSMUSG00000029823
UniProt	Q9Y383	Q7TNC4
RefSeq (mRNA)	NM_016019; NM_001244585; NM_001270643	NM_001170848; NM_001170849; NM_138680; NM_001311099; NM_001311100 NM_001331222; NM_001331223
RefSeq (protein)	NP_001231514; NP_001257572; NP_057103	NP_001164319; NP_001164320; NP_001298028; NP_001298029; NP_001318151 NP_001318152; NP_619621
Location (UCSC)	Chr 7: 139.34 – 139.42 Mb	Chr 6: 38.55 – 38.61 Mb
PubMed search
- Wikidata
View/Edit Human	View/Edit Mouse

Putative RNA-binding protein Luc7-like 2 is a protein that in humans is encoded by the LUC7L2 gene.
