= INTS1 =

Protein-coding gene in the species Homo sapiens

Identifiers
- Aliases: INTS1, INT1, NET28, integrator complex subunit 1, NDCAGF
- External IDs: OMIM: 611345; MGI: 1915760; GeneCards: INTS1

Gene location (Human)
Chr.	Chromosome 7 (human)
Band	7p22.3	Start	1,470,277 bp
Band	7p22.3	End	1,504,389 bp

Gene location (Mouse)
Chr.	Chromosome 5 (mouse)
Band	5|5 G2	Start	139,737,037 bp
Band	5|5 G2	End	139,761,429 bp
RNA expression pattern
Bgee	Human / Mouse (ortholog); Top expressed in: left testis; right testis; apex of heart; right frontal lobe; right hemisphere of cerebellum; mucosa of transverse colon; anterior pituitary; right lobe of thyroid gland; left lobe of thyroid gland; right uterine tube / Top expressed in: tail of embryo; genital tubercle; spermatocyte; neural layer of retina; primary visual cortex; superior frontal gyrus; ventricular zone; yolk sac; muscle of thigh; spermatid; More reference expression data
BioGPS	n/a
Orthologs
Databases	NCBI: entry; OMA: entry
Species	Human	Mouse
Entrez	26173	68510
Ensembl	ENSG00000164880	ENSMUSG00000029547
UniProt	Q8N201	Q6P4S8
RefSeq (mRNA)	NM_001080453	NM_026748
RefSeq (protein)	NP_001073922	NP_081024
Location (UCSC)	Chr 7: 1.47 – 1.5 Mb	Chr 5: 139.74 – 139.76 Mb
PubMed search
- Wikidata
View/Edit Human	View/Edit Mouse

Integrator complex subunit 1 is a protein that in humans is encoded by the INTS1 gene.

== Function ==
INTS1 is a subunit of the Integrator complex, which associates with the C-terminal domain of RNA polymerase II large subunit (POLR2A; MIM 180660) and mediates 3-prime end processing of small nuclear RNAs U1 (RNU1; MIM 180680) and U2 (RNU2; MIM 180690) (Baillat et al., 2005 [PubMed 16239144]).
