= Zinc finger protein 394 =

Protein found in humans

ZNF394

Identifiers
- Aliases: ZNF394, ZKSCAN14, ZSCAN46, zinc finger protein 394
- External IDs: MGI: 1914485; GeneCards: ZNF394

Gene location (Human)
Chr.	Chromosome 7 (human)
Band	7q22.1	Start	99,473,877 bp
Band	7q22.1	End	99,504,857 bp

Gene location (Mouse)
Chr.	Chromosome 5 (mouse)
Band	5|5 G2	Start	145,131,756 bp
Band	5|5 G2	End	145,138,678 bp
RNA expression pattern
Bgee	Human / Mouse (ortholog); Top expressed in: mononuclear cell; monocyte; blood; bone marrow; granulocyte; bone marrow cell; Achilles tendon; gonad; sural nerve; mucosa of urinary bladder / Top expressed in: primary oocyte; saccule; zygote; otic vesicle; secondary oocyte; masseter muscle; spermatocyte; motor neuron; granulocyte; muscle of thigh; More reference expression data
BioGPS	n/a
Gene ontology
Molecular function	DNA binding; protein binding; nucleic acid binding; metal ion binding; DNA-binding transcription factor activity; DNA-binding transcription factor activity, RNA polymerase II-specific
Cellular component	intracellular anatomical structure; nucleus
Biological process	transcription, DNA-templated; regulation of transcription, DNA-templated; regulation of transcription by RNA polymerase II
Sources:Amigo / QuickGO
Orthologs
Databases	NCBI: entry; OMA: entry
Species	Human	Mouse
Entrez	84124	67235
Ensembl	ENSG00000160908	ENSMUSG00000029627
UniProt	Q53GI3	Q9Z1D9
RefSeq (mRNA)	NM_032164; NM_001345967; NM_001345968	NM_023322
RefSeq (protein)	NP_001332896; NP_001332897; NP_115540	NP_075811
Location (UCSC)	Chr 7: 99.47 – 99.5 Mb	Chr 5: 145.13 – 145.14 Mb
PubMed search
- Wikidata
View/Edit Human	View/Edit Mouse

Zinc finger protein 394 is a protein that in humans is encoded by the ZNF394 gene.
