= Tectonin beta-propeller repeat containing 1 =

Protein-coding gene in the species Homo sapiens

TECPR1

Identifiers
- Aliases: TECPR1, tectonin beta-propeller repeat containing 1
- External IDs: OMIM: 614781; MGI: 1917631; GeneCards: TECPR1
Available structures
PDB	Ortholog search: PDBe RCSB
PDB	List of PDB id codes 4TQ1

Gene location (Human)
Chr.	Chromosome 7 (human)
Band	7q21.3	Start	98,214,624 bp
Band	7q21.3	End	98,252,232 bp

Gene location (Mouse)
Chr.	Chromosome 5 (mouse)
Band	5|5 G2	Start	144,131,260 bp
Band	5|5 G2	End	144,160,433 bp
RNA expression pattern
Bgee	Human / Mouse (ortholog); Top expressed in: parotid gland; pancreatic ductal cell; mucosa of ileum; endothelial cell; sural nerve; trachea; granulocyte; middle temporal gyrus; prefrontal cortex; tibialis anterior muscle / Top expressed in: lacrimal gland; Rostral migratory stream; cerebellar cortex; internal carotid artery; iris; motor neuron; thymus; substantia nigra; neural layer of retina; external carotid artery; More reference expression data
BioGPS	n/a
Gene ontology
Molecular function	protein binding; phosphatidylinositol-3-phosphate binding; lipid binding
Cellular component	integral component of membrane; lysosomal membrane; autophagosome membrane; lysosome; cytoplasmic vesicle; membrane; nucleoplasm; intracellular membrane-bounded organelle
Biological process	autophagy; autophagosome maturation
Sources:Amigo / QuickGO
Orthologs
Databases	NCBI: entry; OMA: entry
Species	Human	Mouse
Entrez	25851	70381
Ensembl	ENSG00000205356	ENSMUSG00000066621
UniProt	Q7Z6L1	Q80VP0
RefSeq (mRNA)	NM_015395	NM_027410; NM_001356992; NM_001356993
RefSeq (protein)	NP_056210	NP_081686; NP_001343921; NP_001343922
Location (UCSC)	Chr 7: 98.21 – 98.25 Mb	Chr 5: 144.13 – 144.16 Mb
PubMed search
- Wikidata
View/Edit Human	View/Edit Mouse

Tectonin beta-propeller repeat containing 1 is a protein that in humans is encoded by the TECPR1 gene.

== Function ==
This gene encodes a tethering factor involved in autophagy. The encoded protein is found at autolysosomes, and is involved in targeting protein aggregates, damaged mitochondria, and bacterial pathogens for autophagy
