= CPED1 =

Protein found in humans

Identifiers
- Aliases: CPED1, C7orf58, FLJ21986, cadherin like and PC-esterase domain containing 1
- External IDs: MGI: 2444814; HomoloGene: 57014; GeneCards: CPED1; OMA:CPED1 - orthologs

Gene location (Human)
Chr.	Chromosome 7 (human)
Band	7q31.31	Start	120,988,697 bp
Band	7q31.31	End	121,297,442 bp

Gene location (Mouse)
Chr.	Chromosome 6 (mouse)
Band	6|6 A3.1	Start	21,985,915 bp
Band	6|6 A3.1	End	22,256,403 bp
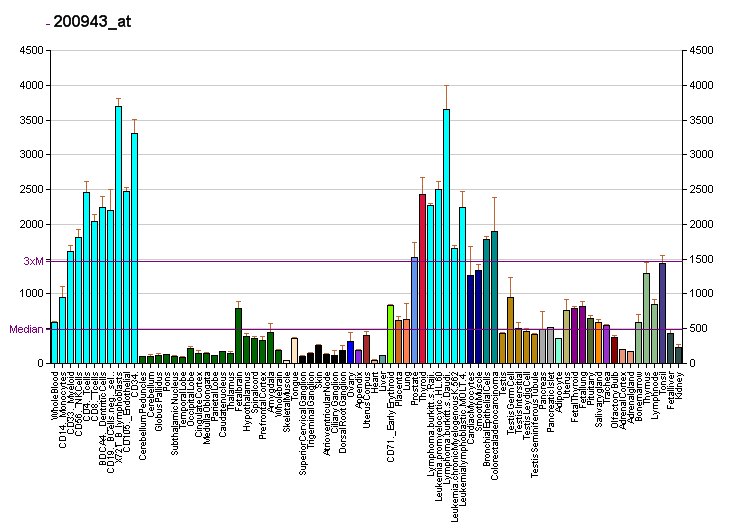

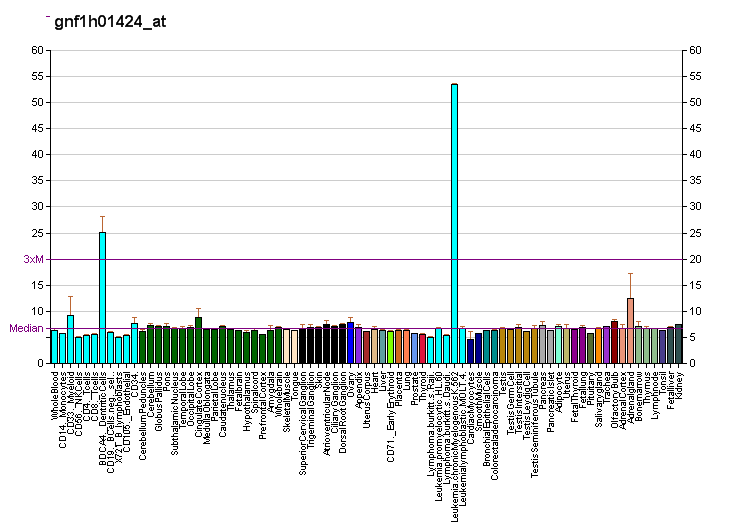

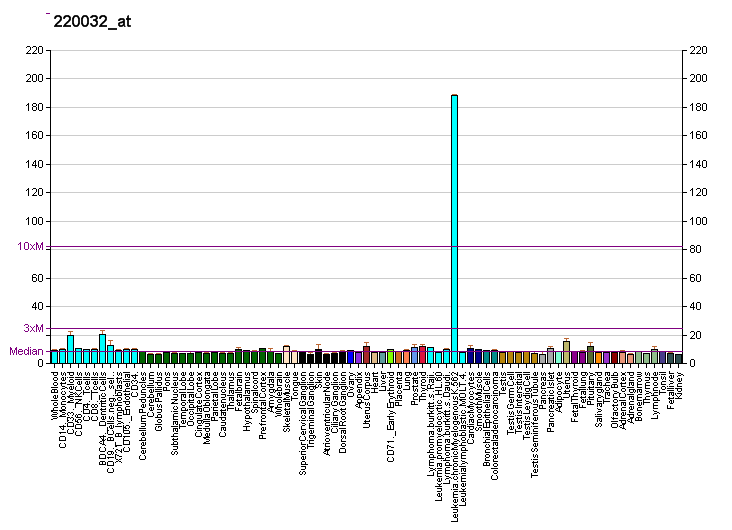
RNA expression pattern
Bgee	Human / Mouse (ortholog); Top expressed in: tail of epididymis; saphenous vein; superficial temporal artery; seminal vesicula; urethra; Skeletal muscle tissue of biceps brachii; right coronary artery; vena cava; synovial joint; Achilles tendon / Top expressed in: renal capsule; genital tubercle; interventricular septum; muscle of thigh; hand; ascending aorta; desmocranium; aortic valve; esophagus; temporal muscle; More reference expression data
BioGPS	More reference expression data
Orthologs
Species	Human	Mouse
Entrez	79974	214642
Ensembl	ENSG00000106034	ENSMUSG00000062980
UniProt	A4D0V7; E9PCC8	n/a
RefSeq (mRNA)	NM_001105533; NM_024913	NM_001081351
RefSeq (protein)	NP_001099003; NP_079189	n/a
Location (UCSC)	Chr 7: 120.99 – 121.3 Mb	Chr 6: 21.99 – 22.26 Mb
PubMed search
- Wikidata
View/Edit Human	View/Edit Mouse

CPED1, or cadherin like and PC-esterase domain containing 1, is a protein that in humans is encoded by the CPED1 gene.
