= TMEM196 =

Protein-coding gene in the species Homo sapiens

Identifiers
- Aliases: TMEM196, transmembrane protein 196
- External IDs: MGI: 2685374; HomoloGene: 27397; GeneCards: TMEM196; OMA:TMEM196 - orthologs

Gene location (Human)
Chr.	Chromosome 7 (human)
Band	7p21.1	Start	19,719,315 bp
Band	7p21.1	End	19,773,617 bp

Gene location (Mouse)
Chr.	Chromosome 12 (mouse)
Band	12|12 F2	Start	119,909,557 bp
Band	12|12 F2	End	119,984,981 bp
RNA expression pattern
Bgee	Human / Mouse (ortholog); Top expressed in: synovial joint; islet of Langerhans; testicle; ventricular zone; ganglionic eminence; prefrontal cortex; dorsolateral prefrontal cortex; synovial membrane; Brodmann area 9; cingulate gyrus / Top expressed in: mammillary body; supraoptic nucleus; substantia nigra; lumbar subsegment of spinal cord; superior frontal gyrus; facial motor nucleus; primary visual cortex; ventral tegmental area; prefrontal cortex; primary motor cortex; More reference expression data
BioGPS	n/a
Orthologs
Species	Human	Mouse
Entrez	256130	217951
Ensembl	ENSG00000173452	ENSMUSG00000048004
UniProt	Q5HYL7	n/a
RefSeq (mRNA)	NM_152774; NM_001363562; NM_001366625; NM_001366626; NM_001366627 NM_001366628	NM_001160385; NM_001294146; NM_001294154; NM_001379146
RefSeq (protein)	NP_689987; NP_001350491; NP_001353554; NP_001353555; NP_001353556 NP_001353557	n/a
Location (UCSC)	Chr 7: 19.72 – 19.77 Mb	Chr 12: 119.91 – 119.98 Mb
PubMed search
- Wikidata
View/Edit Human	View/Edit Mouse

Transmembrane protein 196 is a protein that in humans is encoded by the TMEM196 gene.
