= Zinc finger protein 107 =

Protein found in humans

ZNF107

Identifiers
- Aliases: ZNF107, Y8, ZFD25, ZNF588, smap-7, zinc finger protein 107
- External IDs: OMIM: 603989; GeneCards: ZNF107

Gene location (Human)
Chr.	Chromosome 7 (human)
Band	7q11.21	Start	64,666,099 bp
Band	7q11.21	End	64,711,577 bp
RNA expression pattern
Bgee	Human / Mouse (ortholog); Top expressed in: secondary oocyte; lymph node; ventricular zone; tonsil; testicle; buccal mucosa cell; ganglionic eminence; gonad; skin of thigh; epithelium of nasopharynx / n/a; More reference expression data
BioGPS	n/a
Gene ontology
Molecular function	DNA binding; metal ion binding; nucleic acid binding; molecular function; DNA-binding transcription factor activity, RNA polymerase II-specific
Cellular component	nucleus; cellular component
Biological process	regulation of transcription, DNA-templated; transcription, DNA-templated; biological process; regulation of transcription by RNA polymerase II
Sources:Amigo / QuickGO
Orthologs
Databases	NCBI: entry; OMA: entry
Species	Human	Mouse
Entrez	51427	n/a
Ensembl	ENSG00000196247	n/a
UniProt	Q9UII5	n/a
RefSeq (mRNA)	NM_001013746; NM_001282359; NM_001282360; NM_016220; NM_001388025 NM_001388026	n/a
RefSeq (protein)	NP_001013768; NP_001269288; NP_001269289; NP_057304	n/a
Location (UCSC)	Chr 7: 64.67 – 64.71 Mb	n/a
PubMed search		n/a
- Wikidata
View/Edit Human

Zinc finger protein 107 is a protein that in humans is encoded by the ZNF107 gene.

== Function ==
This gene encodes a protein containing multiple C2H2-type zinc finger regions. Proteins containing zinc fingers may act as transcriptional regulators, but may also have other cellular functions. Alternative splicing results in multiple transcript variants.
