= ZMIZ2 =

Protein-coding gene in the species Homo sapiens

Identifiers
- Aliases: ZMIZ2, NET27, TRAFIP20, ZIMP7, hZIMP7, zinc finger MIZ-type containing 2
- External IDs: OMIM: 611196; MGI: 106374; GeneCards: ZMIZ2

Gene location (Human)
Chr.	Chromosome 7 (human)
Band	7p13	Start	44,748,581 bp
Band	7p13	End	44,769,881 bp

Gene location (Mouse)
Chr.	Chromosome 11 (mouse)
Band	11 A1|11 3.95 cM	Start	6,389,074 bp
Band	11 A1|11 3.95 cM	End	6,406,158 bp
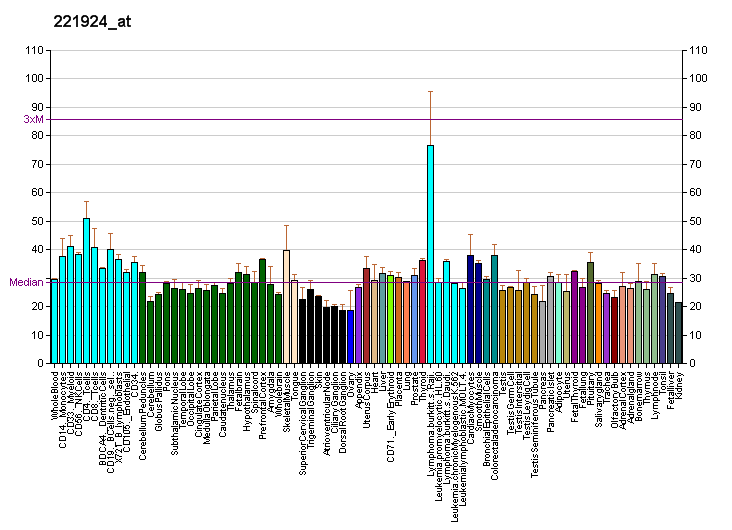

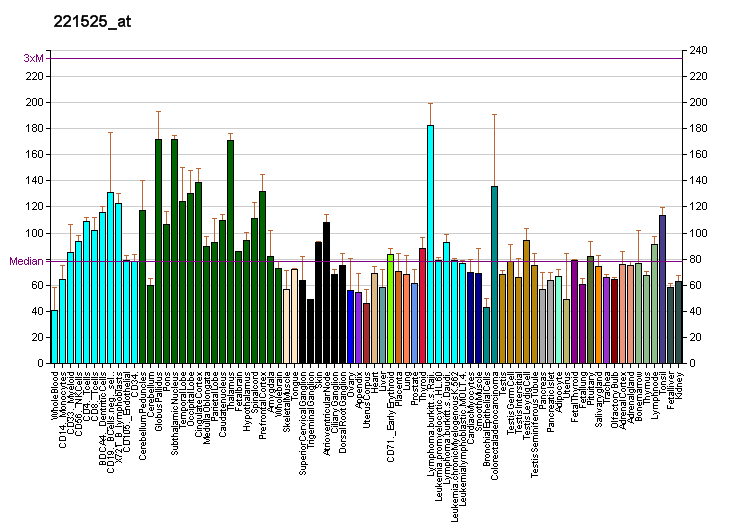

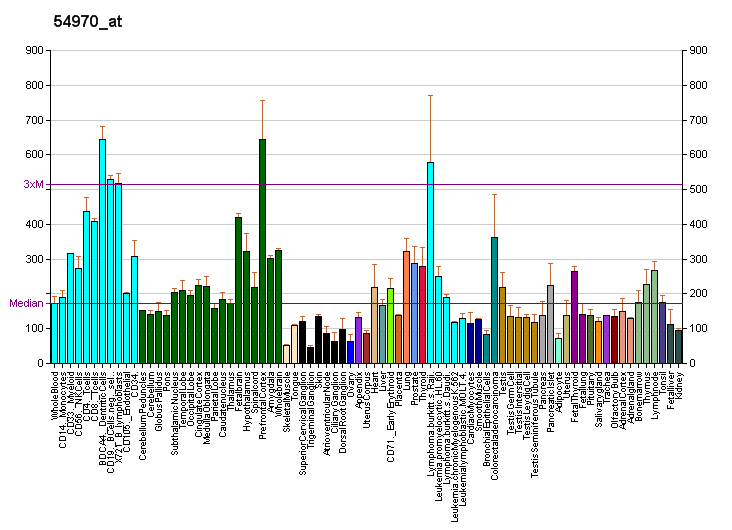
RNA expression pattern
Bgee	Human / Mouse (ortholog); Top expressed in: endothelial cell; right uterine tube; right lobe of thyroid gland; left lobe of thyroid gland; right frontal lobe; Region I of hippocampus proper; anterior pituitary; body of pancreas; right hemisphere of cerebellum; granulocyte / Top expressed in: perirhinal cortex; superior frontal gyrus; primary visual cortex; entorhinal cortex; dentate gyrus of hippocampal formation granule cell; CA3 field; Ileal epithelium; ventricular zone; cerebellar cortex; lip; More reference expression data
BioGPS	More reference expression data
Gene ontology
Molecular function	zinc ion binding; protein binding; nuclear receptor coactivator activity; metal ion binding
Cellular component	nuclear replication fork; mitochondrion; nucleus; nucleoplasm
Biological process	regulation of transcription, DNA-templated; transcription, DNA-templated; positive regulation of transcription by RNA polymerase II
Sources:Amigo / QuickGO
Orthologs
Databases	NCBI: entry; OMA: entry
Species	Human	Mouse
Entrez	83637	52915
Ensembl	ENSG00000122515	ENSMUSG00000041164
UniProt	Q8NF64	Q8CIE2
RefSeq (mRNA)	NM_001300959; NM_031449; NM_174929	NM_001005867; NM_028601
RefSeq (protein)	NP_001287888; NP_113637; NP_777589	NP_001005867; NP_082877
Location (UCSC)	Chr 7: 44.75 – 44.77 Mb	Chr 11: 6.39 – 6.41 Mb
PubMed search
- Wikidata
View/Edit Human	View/Edit Mouse

Zinc finger MIZ domain-containing protein 2 is a protein that in humans is encoded by the ZMIZ2 gene.
