= Nucleoporin NUP42 =

Protein found in humans

NUP42

Identifiers
- Aliases: NUP42, CG1, NLP-1, NLP_1, hCG1, nucleoporin like 2, NUPL2, nucleoporin 42
- External IDs: MGI: 2387631; GeneCards: NUP42

Gene location (Human)
Chr.	Chromosome 7 (human)
Band	7p15.3	Start	23,181,841 bp
Band	7p15.3	End	23,201,011 bp

Gene location (Mouse)
Chr.	Chromosome 5 (mouse)
Band	5|5 A3	Start	24,369,961 bp
Band	5|5 A3	End	24,389,011 bp
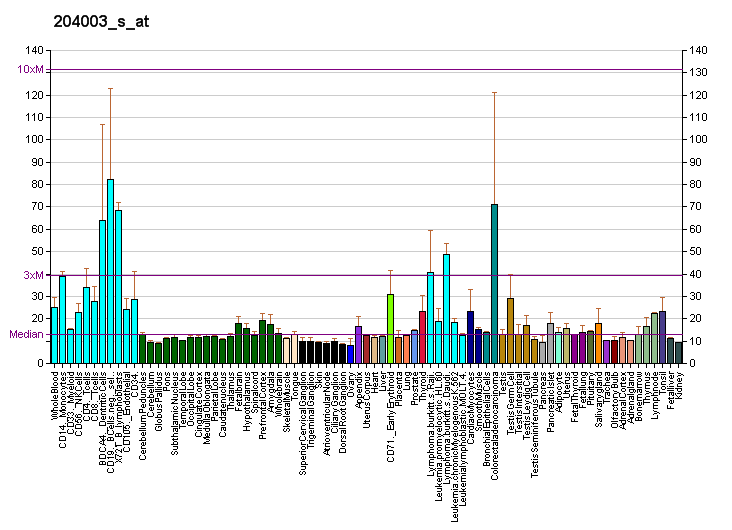
RNA expression pattern
Bgee	Human / Mouse (ortholog); Top expressed in: cerebellar hemisphere; monocyte; right hemisphere of cerebellum; rectum; right uterine tube; right testis; left testis; right adrenal cortex; gonad; spleen / Top expressed in: spermatid; seminiferous tubule; spermatocyte; interventricular septum; internal carotid artery; external carotid artery; embryo; muscle of thigh; embryo; zygote; More reference expression data
BioGPS	More reference expression data
Gene ontology
Molecular function	nuclear export signal receptor activity; metal ion binding; protein binding; RNA binding
Cellular component	nuclear membrane; nuclear envelope; membrane; nuclear pore; nucleoplasm; nucleus; cytosol; host cell
Biological process	mRNA transport; viral transcription; protein sumoylation; mitotic nuclear membrane disassembly; protein export from nucleus; regulation of cellular response to heat; protein transport; viral process; intracellular transport of virus; mRNA export from nucleus; tRNA export from nucleus; regulation of gene silencing by miRNA; regulation of glycolytic process; transport
Sources:Amigo / QuickGO
Orthologs
Databases	NCBI: entry; OMA: entry
Species	Human	Mouse
Entrez	11097	231042
Ensembl	ENSG00000136243	ENSMUSG00000048439
UniProt	O15504	Q8CIC2
RefSeq (mRNA)	NM_007342; NM_001370443; NM_001370444; NM_001370445; NM_001370446	NM_153092; NM_001346582
RefSeq (protein)	NP_031368; NP_001357372; NP_001357373; NP_001357374; NP_001357375	NP_001333511; NP_694732
Location (UCSC)	Chr 7: 23.18 – 23.2 Mb	Chr 5: 24.37 – 24.39 Mb
PubMed search
- Wikidata
View/Edit Human	View/Edit Mouse

Nucleoporin NUP42 is a protein that in humans is encoded by the NUP42 gene (previously NUPL2). This protein is involved in the transporting of mRNA (with poly(A) tails) out of the cell nucleus and into the cytoplasm.
