= AVL9 cell migration associated =

Protein-coding gene in the species Homo sapiens

AVL9

Identifiers
- Aliases: AVL9, KIAA0241, AVL9 cell migration associated
- External IDs: OMIM: 612927; MGI: 1926187; GeneCards: AVL9

Gene location (Human)
Chr.	Chromosome 7 (human)
Band	7p14.3	Start	32,495,426 bp
Band	7p14.3	End	32,588,726 bp

Gene location (Mouse)
Chr.	Chromosome 6 (mouse)
Band	6|6 B3	Start	56,691,884 bp
Band	6|6 B3	End	56,738,897 bp
RNA expression pattern
Bgee	Human / Mouse (ortholog); Top expressed in: Epithelium of choroid plexus; endothelial cell; Brodmann area 23; rectum; middle temporal gyrus; mucosa of colon; jejunal mucosa; buccal mucosa cell; mucosa of sigmoid colon; epithelium of nasopharynx / Top expressed in: Region I of hippocampus proper; left colon; ventral tegmental area; dorsomedial hypothalamic nucleus; retinal pigment epithelium; habenula; ciliary body; paraventricular nucleus of hypothalamus; dorsal tegmental nucleus; ganglionic eminence; More reference expression data
BioGPS	n/a
Orthologs
Databases	NCBI: entry; OMA: entry
Species	Human	Mouse
Entrez	23080	78937
Ensembl	ENSG00000105778	ENSMUSG00000029787
UniProt	Q8NBF6	Q80U56
RefSeq (mRNA)	NM_015060	NM_030235
RefSeq (protein)	NP_055875	NP_084511
Location (UCSC)	Chr 7: 32.5 – 32.59 Mb	Chr 6: 56.69 – 56.74 Mb
PubMed search
- Wikidata
View/Edit Human	View/Edit Mouse

AVL9 cell migration associated is a protein that in humans is encoded by the AVL9 gene.
