= Leucine rich repeat containing 61 =

Protein-coding gene in the species Homo sapiens

LRRC61

Identifiers
- Aliases: LRRC61, HSPC295, leucine rich repeat containing 61
- External IDs: MGI: 2652848; HomoloGene: 41538; GeneCards: LRRC61; OMA:LRRC61 - orthologs

Gene location (Human)
| Chr. | Chromosome 7 (human) |
| Band | 7q36.1 | Start | 150,323,263 bp |
| Band | 7q36.1 | End | 150,338,156 bp |

Gene location (Mouse)
| Chr. | Chromosome 6 (mouse) |
| Band | 6|6 B2.3 | Start | 48,531,730 bp |
| Band | 6|6 B2.3 | End | 48,547,656 bp |
RNA expression pattern
| Bgee | Human / Mouse (ortholog); Top expressed in: right uterine tube; gonad; right adrenal gland; right adrenal cortex; left adrenal gland; left adrenal cortex; ganglionic eminence; olfactory zone of nasal mucosa; right lobe of liver; ventricular zone / Top expressed in: ascending aorta; aortic valve; spermatocyte; muscle of thigh; granulocyte; zygote; saccule; otic vesicle; neural layer of retina; right kidney; More reference expression data |
| BioGPS | n/a |
Orthologs
| Species | Human | Mouse |
| Entrez | 65999 | 243371 |
| Ensembl | ENSG00000127399 | ENSMUSG00000073096 |
| UniProt | Q9BV99 | Q8R2R5 |
| RefSeq (mRNA) | NM_001142928; NM_023942; NM_001363433; NM_001363434 | NM_001110160; NM_177736 |
| RefSeq (protein) | NP_001136400; NP_076431; NP_001350362; NP_001350363 | NP_001103630; NP_808404 |
| Location (UCSC) | Chr 7: 150.32 – 150.34 Mb | Chr 6: 48.53 – 48.55 Mb |
| PubMed search |
- Wikidata
| View/Edit Human | View/Edit Mouse |

Leucine rich repeat containing 61 is a protein that in humans is encoded by the LRRC61 gene.
