= Zinc finger protein 786 =

Protein found in humans

ZNF786

Identifiers
- Aliases: ZNF786, zinc finger protein 786
- External IDs: MGI: 3026883; GeneCards: ZNF786

Gene location (Human)
Chr.	Chromosome 7 (human)
Band	7q36.1	Start	149,069,641 bp
Band	7q36.1	End	149,090,782 bp

Gene location (Mouse)
Chr.	Chromosome 6 (mouse)
Band	6|6 B2.3	Start	47,796,200 bp
Band	6|6 B2.3	End	47,807,801 bp
RNA expression pattern
Bgee	Human / Mouse (ortholog); Top expressed in: skin of arm; tendon of biceps brachii; nipple; testicle; internal globus pallidus; thymus; granulocyte; ventricular zone; ganglionic eminence; prefrontal cortex / Top expressed in: spermatid; ventricular zone; embryo; neural tube; embryo; ganglionic eminence; dentate gyrus of hippocampal formation granule cell; genital tubercle; neural layer of retina; morula; More reference expression data
BioGPS	n/a
Gene ontology
Molecular function	DNA binding; metal ion binding; nucleic acid binding; DNA-binding transcription factor activity, RNA polymerase II-specific
Cellular component	intracellular anatomical structure; nucleus
Biological process	regulation of transcription, DNA-templated; transcription, DNA-templated; regulation of transcription by RNA polymerase II
Sources:Amigo / QuickGO
Orthologs
Databases	NCBI: entry; OMA: entry
Species	Human	Mouse
Entrez	136051	330301
Ensembl	ENSG00000197362	ENSMUSG00000051499
UniProt	Q8N393	Q8BV42
RefSeq (mRNA)	NM_152411	NM_177882
RefSeq (protein)	NP_689624	NP_808550
Location (UCSC)	Chr 7: 149.07 – 149.09 Mb	Chr 6: 47.8 – 47.81 Mb
PubMed search
- Wikidata
View/Edit Human	View/Edit Mouse

Zinc finger protein 786 is a protein that in humans is encoded by the ZNF786 gene.
