= PDAP1 =

Protein-coding gene in the species Homo sapiens

Identifiers
- Aliases: PDAP1, HASPP28, PAP, PAP1, PDGFA associated protein 1
- External IDs: OMIM: 607075; MGI: 2448536; GeneCards: PDAP1

Gene location (Human)
Chr.	Chromosome 7 (human)
Band	7q22.1	Start	99,392,048 bp
Band	7q22.1	End	99,408,597 bp

Gene location (Mouse)
Chr.	Chromosome 5 (mouse)
Band	5|5 G2	Start	145,065,579 bp
Band	5|5 G2	End	145,077,048 bp
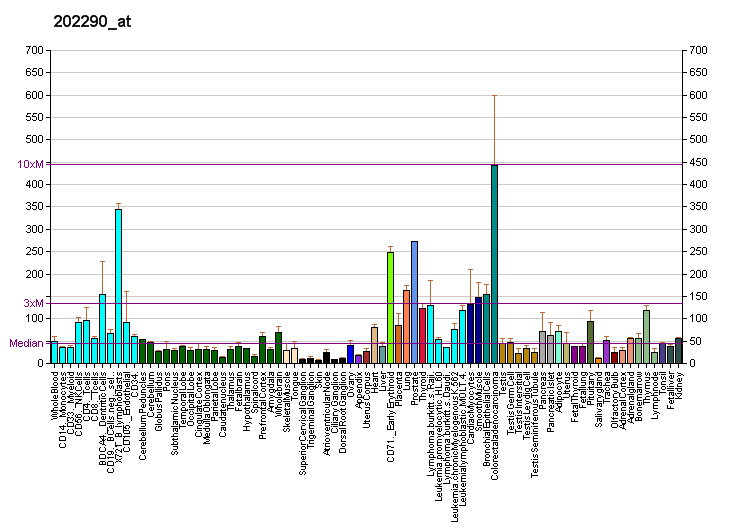

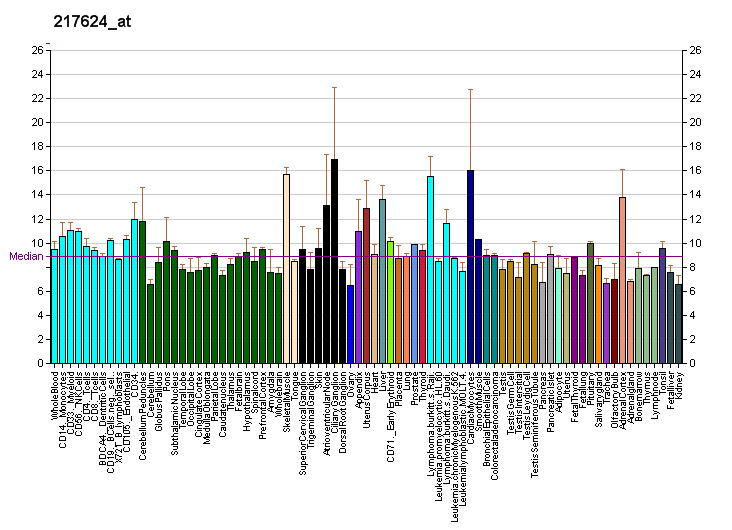
RNA expression pattern
Bgee	Human / Mouse (ortholog); Top expressed in: gastrocnemius muscle; gastric mucosa; tibial arteries; sural nerve; muscle layer of sigmoid colon; thoracic aorta; ascending aorta; left coronary artery; muscle of thigh; right coronary artery / Top expressed in: Rostral migratory stream; tail of embryo; primitive streak; mandibular prominence; maxillary prominence; genital tubercle; somite; abdominal wall; lacrimal gland; epiblast; More reference expression data
BioGPS	More reference expression data
Gene ontology
Molecular function	RNA binding
Cellular component	extracellular region; ficolin-1-rich granule lumen; cytosol; plasma membrane
Biological process	signal transduction; cell population proliferation; neutrophil degranulation
Sources:Amigo / QuickGO
Orthologs
Databases	NCBI: entry; OMA: entry
Species	Human	Mouse
Entrez	11333	231887
Ensembl	ENSG00000106244	ENSMUSG00000029623
UniProt	Q13442	Q3UHX2
RefSeq (mRNA)	NM_014891	NM_001033313
RefSeq (protein)	NP_055706	NP_001028485
Location (UCSC)	Chr 7: 99.39 – 99.41 Mb	Chr 5: 145.07 – 145.08 Mb
PubMed search
- Wikidata
View/Edit Human	View/Edit Mouse

28 kDa heat- and acid-stable phosphoprotein is a protein that in humans is encoded by the PDAP1 gene.
