= TMEM130 =

Protein-coding gene in the species Homo sapiens

Identifiers
- Aliases: TMEM130, transmembrane protein 130
- External IDs: MGI: 3607706; HomoloGene: 17680; GeneCards: TMEM130; OMA:TMEM130 - orthologs

Gene location (Human)
Chr.	Chromosome 7 (human)
Band	7q22.1	Start	98,846,488 bp
Band	7q22.1	End	98,870,771 bp

Gene location (Mouse)
Chr.	Chromosome 5 (mouse)
Band	5|5 G2	Start	144,672,725 bp
Band	5|5 G2	End	144,698,628 bp
RNA expression pattern
Bgee	Human / Mouse (ortholog); Top expressed in: Brodmann area 9; prefrontal cortex; nucleus accumbens; right frontal lobe; hypothalamus; cingulate gyrus; anterior cingulate cortex; amygdala; lateral nuclear group of thalamus; caudate nucleus / Top expressed in: dorsomedial hypothalamic nucleus; paraventricular nucleus of hypothalamus; suprachiasmatic nucleus; arcuate nucleus; ventromedial nucleus; lateral hypothalamus; median eminence; ventral tegmental area; habenula; mammillary body; More reference expression data
BioGPS	n/a
Orthologs
Species	Human	Mouse
Entrez	222865	243339
Ensembl	ENSG00000166448	ENSMUSG00000043388
UniProt	Q8N3G9	Q6NXM3
RefSeq (mRNA)	NM_152913; NM_001134450; NM_001134451	NM_177735
RefSeq (protein)	NP_001127922; NP_001127923; NP_690877	NP_808403
Location (UCSC)	Chr 7: 98.85 – 98.87 Mb	Chr 5: 144.67 – 144.7 Mb
PubMed search
- Wikidata
View/Edit Human	View/Edit Mouse

Transmembrane protein 130 is a protein that in humans is encoded by the TMEM130 gene.
