= Endonuclease/exonuclease/phosphatase family domain containing 1 =

Protein-coding gene in the species Homo sapiens

EEPD1

Identifiers
- Aliases: EEPD1, HSPC107, endonuclease/exonuclease/phosphatase family domain containing 1
- External IDs: OMIM: 617192; MGI: 1914734; HomoloGene: 12144; GeneCards: EEPD1; OMA:EEPD1 - orthologs

Gene location (Human)
Chr.	Chromosome 7 (human)
Band	7p14.2	Start	36,153,254 bp
Band	7p14.2	End	36,301,538 bp

Gene location (Mouse)
Chr.	Chromosome 9 (mouse)
Band	9|9 A4	Start	25,392,843 bp
Band	9|9 A4	End	25,515,406 bp
RNA expression pattern
Bgee	Human / Mouse (ortholog); Top expressed in: ventricular zone; muscle of thigh; gastrocnemius muscle; gallbladder; ganglionic eminence; C1 segment; body of stomach; subcutaneous adipose tissue; right lobe of liver; pancreatic ductal cell / Top expressed in: muscle of thigh; lumbar spinal ganglion; extensor digitorum longus muscle; plantaris muscle; gastrocnemius muscle; masseter muscle; triceps brachii muscle; quadriceps femoris muscle; medial head of gastrocnemius muscle; digastric muscle; More reference expression data
BioGPS	n/a
Orthologs
Species	Human	Mouse
Entrez	80820	67484
Ensembl	ENSG00000122547	ENSMUSG00000036611
UniProt	Q7L9B9	Q3TGW2
RefSeq (mRNA)	NM_030636	NM_026189
RefSeq (protein)	NP_085139	NP_080465
Location (UCSC)	Chr 7: 36.15 – 36.3 Mb	Chr 9: 25.39 – 25.52 Mb
PubMed search
- Wikidata
View/Edit Human	View/Edit Mouse

Endonuclease/exonuclease/phosphatase family domain containing 1 is a protein that in humans is encoded by the EEPD1 gene.
