= LRRC17 =

Protein-coding gene in the species Homo sapiens

Identifiers
- Aliases: LRRC17, P37NB, leucine rich repeat containing 17
- External IDs: MGI: 1921761; HomoloGene: 55929; GeneCards: LRRC17; OMA:LRRC17 - orthologs

Gene location (Human)
Chr.	Chromosome 7 (human)
Band	7q22.1	Start	102,913,000 bp
Band	7q22.1	End	102,945,111 bp

Gene location (Mouse)
Chr.	Chromosome 5 (mouse)
Band	5|5 A3	Start	21,748,557 bp
Band	5|5 A3	End	21,780,902 bp
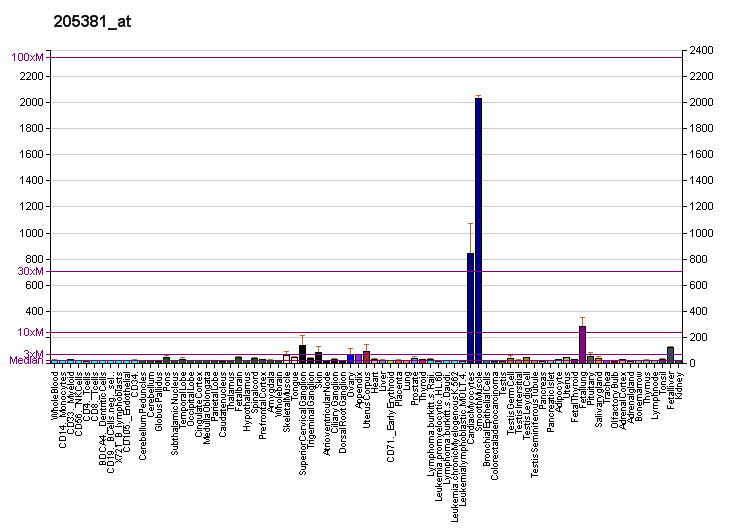
RNA expression pattern
Bgee	Human / Mouse (ortholog); Top expressed in: secondary oocyte; periodontal fiber; right coronary artery; left ovary; right ovary; ventricular zone; Descending thoracic aorta; gallbladder; vena cava; left coronary artery / Top expressed in: dermis; secondary oocyte; efferent ductule; zygote; umbilical cord; ovarian follicle; secondary follicle of ovary; hand; primary oocyte; calvaria; More reference expression data
BioGPS	More reference expression data
Orthologs
Species	Human	Mouse
Entrez	10234	74511
Ensembl	ENSG00000128606	ENSMUSG00000039883
UniProt	Q8N6Y2	Q9CXD9
RefSeq (mRNA)	NM_001031692; NM_005824	NM_028977
RefSeq (protein)	NP_001026862; NP_005815	NP_083253
Location (UCSC)	Chr 7: 102.91 – 102.95 Mb	Chr 5: 21.75 – 21.78 Mb
PubMed search
- Wikidata
View/Edit Human	View/Edit Mouse

Leucine-rich repeat-containing protein 17 is a protein that in humans is encoded by the LRRC17 gene.
