= Up-regulator of cell proliferation =

Protein found in humans

URGCP

Identifiers
- Aliases: URGCP, URG4, upregulator of cell proliferation
- External IDs: OMIM: 610337; MGI: 1919296; GeneCards: URGCP

Gene location (Human)
Chr.	Chromosome 7 (human)
Band	7p13	Start	43,875,894 bp
Band	7p13	End	43,926,411 bp

Gene location (Mouse)
Chr.	Chromosome 11 (mouse)
Band	11|11 A1	Start	5,663,417 bp
Band	11|11 A1	End	5,712,376 bp
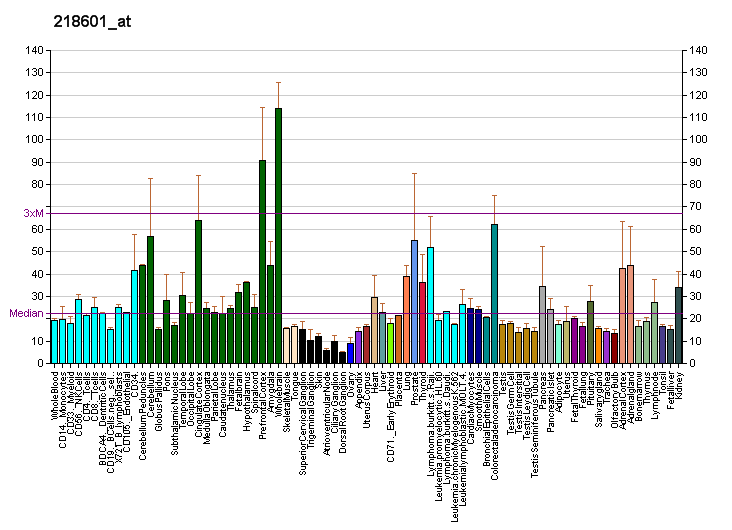
RNA expression pattern
Bgee	Human / Mouse (ortholog); Top expressed in: right adrenal cortex; left adrenal gland; left adrenal cortex; apex of heart; cerebellar hemisphere; right hemisphere of cerebellum; glutes; triceps brachii muscle; gastrocnemius muscle; pituitary gland / Top expressed in: substantia nigra; otolith organ; utricle; Paneth cell; Rostral migratory stream; ciliary body; iris; fossa; condyle; retinal pigment epithelium; More reference expression data
BioGPS	More reference expression data
Gene ontology
Molecular function	GTP binding
Cellular component	cytoplasm; nucleus; cytosol
Biological process	cell cycle
Sources:Amigo / QuickGO
Orthologs
Databases	NCBI: entry; OMA: entry
Species	Human	Mouse
Entrez	55665	72046
Ensembl	ENSG00000106608	ENSMUSG00000049680
UniProt	Q8TCY9	Q5NCI0
RefSeq (mRNA)	NM_017920; NM_001077663; NM_001077664; NM_001290075; NM_001290076	NM_001077661; NM_178623; NM_001361588; NM_001361589; NM_001361590 NM_001361591; NM_001361592
RefSeq (protein)	NP_001071131; NP_001071132; NP_001277004; NP_001277005; NP_060390	NP_001071129; NP_848738; NP_001348517; NP_001348518; NP_001348519 NP_001348520; NP_001348521
Location (UCSC)	Chr 7: 43.88 – 43.93 Mb	Chr 11: 5.66 – 5.71 Mb
PubMed search
- Wikidata
View/Edit Human	View/Edit Mouse

Up-regulator of cell proliferation (or URGCP) is a protein that in human humans is encoded by the URGCP gene (previously URG4). This protein may regulate Cyclin D1 expression, and through it impact cell cycle progression.
