= Zinc finger protein 727 =

Protein found in humans

ZNF727

Identifiers
- Aliases: ZNF727, ZNF727P, zinc finger protein 727
- External IDs: GeneCards: ZNF727

Gene location (Human)
Chr.	Chromosome 7 (human)
Band	7q11.21	Start	64,045,434 bp
Band	7q11.21	End	64,085,339 bp
RNA expression pattern
Bgee	Human / Mouse (ortholog); Top expressed in: germinal epithelium; gonad; endothelial cell; secondary oocyte; testicle; corpus epididymis; buccal mucosa cell; lactiferous duct; caput epididymis; parietal pleura / n/a; More reference expression data
BioGPS	n/a
Gene ontology
Molecular function	DNA binding; metal ion binding; nucleic acid binding; DNA-binding transcription factor activity, RNA polymerase II-specific
Cellular component	intracellular anatomical structure; nucleus
Biological process	transcription, DNA-templated; regulation of transcription, DNA-templated; regulation of transcription by RNA polymerase II
Sources:Amigo / QuickGO
Orthologs
Databases	NCBI: entry; OMA: entry
Species	Human	Mouse
Entrez	442319	n/a
Ensembl	ENSG00000214652	n/a
UniProt	A8MUV8	n/a
RefSeq (mRNA)	NM_001159522	n/a
RefSeq (protein)	NP_001152994	n/a
Location (UCSC)	Chr 7: 64.05 – 64.09 Mb	n/a
PubMed search		n/a
- Wikidata
View/Edit Human

Zinc finger protein 727 is a protein that in humans is encoded by the ZNF727 gene.
