= ZNF277 =

Protein-coding gene in the species Homo sapiens

Identifiers
- Aliases: ZNF277, NRIF4, ZNF277P, zinc finger protein 277
- External IDs: OMIM: 605465; MGI: 1890393; GeneCards: ZNF277

Gene location (Human)
Chr.	Chromosome 7 (human)
Band	7q31.1	Start	112,206,695 bp
Band	7q31.1	End	112,343,934 bp

Gene location (Mouse)
Chr.	Chromosome 12 (mouse)
Band	12|12 B1	Start	40,365,045 bp
Band	12|12 B1	End	40,495,901 bp
RNA expression pattern
Bgee	Human / Mouse (ortholog); Top expressed in: Achilles tendon; monocyte; germinal epithelium; islet of Langerhans; body of pancreas; ganglionic eminence; jejunal mucosa; oocyte; skin of thigh; gallbladder / Top expressed in: primary oocyte; cumulus cell; efferent ductule; vas deferens; abdominal wall; medial ganglionic eminence; zygote; secondary oocyte; ovary; endocardial cushion; More reference expression data
BioGPS	n/a
Gene ontology
Molecular function	DNA binding; metal ion binding; nucleic acid binding; RNA polymerase II cis-regulatory region sequence-specific DNA binding; RNA polymerase II core promoter sequence-specific DNA binding; DNA-binding transcription factor activity, RNA polymerase II-specific
Cellular component	nucleus
Biological process	regulation of cellular senescence; regulation of transcription, DNA-templated; transcription, DNA-templated; cellular response to hydrogen peroxide; regulation of transcription by RNA polymerase II
Sources:Amigo / QuickGO
Orthologs
Databases	NCBI: entry; OMA: entry
Species	Human	Mouse
Entrez	11179	246196
Ensembl	ENSG00000198839	ENSMUSG00000055917
UniProt	Q9NRM2	E9Q6D6
RefSeq (mRNA)	NM_021994	NM_172575; NM_178845
RefSeq (protein)	NP_068834	NP_766163; NP_849173
Location (UCSC)	Chr 7: 112.21 – 112.34 Mb	Chr 12: 40.37 – 40.5 Mb
PubMed search
- Wikidata
View/Edit Human	View/Edit Mouse

Zinc finger protein 277 is a protein that in humans is encoded by the ZNF277 gene (previously ZNF277P). ZNF277 is predicted to be a transcription factor which is involved in regulating cellular senescence. The gene ZNF277 was truncated from its ancestral form, leading to it be labeled as a pseudogene in some places, but is now thought to produce a functionally modified protein.
