= RNF216 intronic transcript 1 =

Non-coding RNA in the species Homo sapiens

RNF216-IT1

Identifiers
- Aliases: RNF216-IT1, RNF216 intronic transcript 1
- External IDs: GeneCards: RNF216-IT1; OMA:RNF216-IT1 - orthologs

Gene location (Human)
Chr.	Chromosome 7 (human)
Band	7p22.1	Start	5,662,432 bp
Band	7p22.1	End	5,680,461 bp
RNA expression pattern
Bgee	Human / Mouse (ortholog); Top expressed in: bone marrow cell; skeletal muscle tissue; epithelium of colon; primary visual cortex; blood; monocyte; popliteal artery; muscle layer of sigmoid colon; tibial arteries; lymph node / n/a; More reference expression data
BioGPS	n/a
Orthologs
Species	Human	Mouse
Entrez	100874342	n/a
Ensembl	ENSG00000237738	n/a
UniProt	n a	n/a
RefSeq (mRNA)	n/a	n/a
RefSeq (protein)	n/a	n/a
Location (UCSC)	Chr 7: 5.66 – 5.68 Mb	n/a
PubMed search		n/a
- Wikidata
View/Edit Human

RNF216 intronic transcript 1 is a protein encoded by the RNF216-IT1 gene in humans.
