= PPP1R17 =

Protein-coding gene in the species Homo sapiens

Identifiers
- Aliases: PPP1R17, C7orf16, GSBS, protein phosphatase 1 regulatory subunit 17
- External IDs: OMIM: 604088; MGI: 1333876; GeneCards: PPP1R17

Gene location (Human)
| Chr. | Chromosome 7 (human) |
| Band | 7p14.3 | Start | 31,687,215 bp |
| Band | 7p14.3 | End | 31,708,455 bp |

Gene location (Mouse)
| Chr. | Chromosome 6 (mouse) |
| Band | 6 B3|6 27.65 cM | Start | 55,994,482 bp |
| Band | 6 B3|6 27.65 cM | End | 56,009,674 bp |
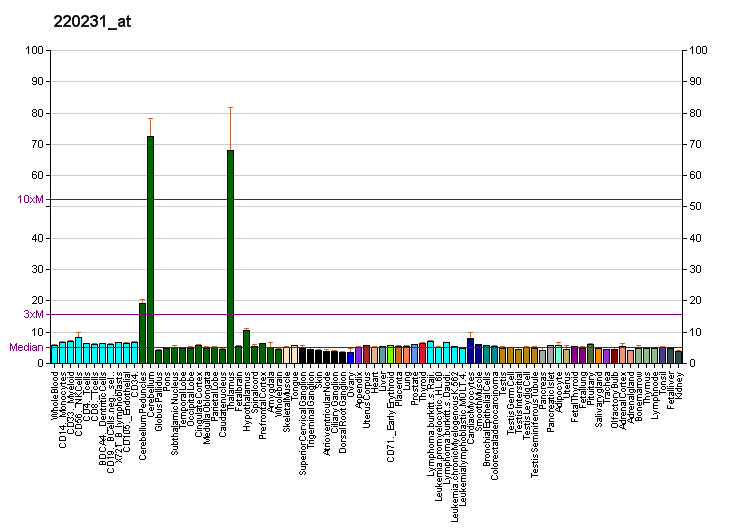
RNA expression pattern
| Bgee | Human / Mouse (ortholog); Top expressed in: ganglionic eminence; lateral nuclear group of thalamus; cerebellar vermis; right hemisphere of cerebellum; ventricular zone; testicle; hypothalamus; pons; anterior pituitary; granulocyte / Top expressed in: lobe of cerebellum; cerebellar vermis; trigeminal ganglion; suprachiasmatic nucleus; dorsomedial hypothalamic nucleus; endocardial cushion; superior cervical ganglion; glossopharyngeal ganglion; atrioventricular junction; Epithelium of choroid plexus; More reference expression data |
| BioGPS | More reference expression data |
Gene ontology
| Molecular function | protein phosphatase inhibitor activity; protein serine/threonine phosphatase inhibitor activity; phosphatase inhibitor activity |
| Cellular component | cellular component; nucleoplasm |
| Biological process | regulation of phosphatase activity; central nervous system development; intracellular signal transduction; negative regulation of catalytic activity; negative regulation of phosphoprotein phosphatase activity |
Sources:Amigo / QuickGO
Orthologs
| Databases | NCBI: entry; OMA: entry |
| Species | Human | Mouse |
| Entrez | 10842 | 19051 |
| Ensembl | ENSG00000106341 | ENSMUSG00000002930 |
| UniProt | O96001 | Q9Z2E4 |
| RefSeq (mRNA) | NM_001145123; NM_006658 | NM_011153 |
| RefSeq (protein) | NP_001138595; NP_006649 | NP_035283 |
| Location (UCSC) | Chr 7: 31.69 – 31.71 Mb | Chr 6: 55.99 – 56.01 Mb |
| PubMed search |
- Wikidata
| View/Edit Human | View/Edit Mouse |

Protein phosphatase 1 regulatory subunit 17 is a protein that in humans is encoded by the PPP1R17 gene.
