= SPDYE1 =

Protein-coding gene in the species Homo sapiens

Identifiers
- Aliases: SPDYE1, Ringo1, SPDYE, WBSCR19, speedy/RINGO cell cycle regulator family member E1, SPDYB2L2
- External IDs: OMIM: 617623; GeneCards: SPDYE1

Gene location (Human)
Chr.	Chromosome 7 (human)
Band	7p13	Start	43,997,897 bp
Band	7p13	End	44,010,124 bp
RNA expression pattern
Bgee	Human / Mouse (ortholog); Top expressed in: testicle; left testis; right testis; monocyte; skeletal muscle tissue; sural nerve; granulocyte; blood; bone marrow; muscle of leg / n/a; More reference expression data
BioGPS	n/a
Orthologs
Databases	NCBI: entry; OMA: entry
Species	Human	Mouse
Entrez	285955	n/a
Ensembl	ENSG00000136206	n/a
UniProt	Q8NFV5	n/a
RefSeq (mRNA)	NM_175064; NM_001378423	n/a
RefSeq (protein)	NP_778234; NP_001365352	n/a
Location (UCSC)	Chr 7: 44 – 44.01 Mb	n/a
PubMed search		n/a
- Wikidata
View/Edit Human

Speedy homolog E1 (Xenopus laevis) is a protein that in humans is encoded by the SPDYE1 gene.

== Function ==
This gene is located at chromosome 7p13 which is close to the Williams Beuren syndrome chromosome region 7q11.23.
