= MTRNR2L6 =

Protein-coding gene in the species Homo sapiens

Identifiers
- Aliases: MTRNR2L6, HN6, MT-RNR2-like 6, MT-RNR2 like 6, MT-RNR2 like 6 (pseudogene)
- External IDs: GeneCards: MTRNR2L6; OMA:MTRNR2L6 - orthologs

Gene location (Human)
Chr.	Chromosome 7 (human)
Band	7q34	Start	142,666,272 bp
Band	7q34	End	142,667,718 bp
RNA expression pattern
Bgee	Human / Mouse (ortholog); Top expressed in: stomach; heart; colon; brain; liver; kidney; lung; dorsolateral prefrontal cortex; cerebellum / n/a; More reference expression data
BioGPS	n/a
Gene ontology
Molecular function	receptor antagonist activity
Cellular component	cytoplasm; extracellular region
Biological process	extracellular negative regulation of signal transduction; negative regulation of execution phase of apoptosis; negative regulation of signaling receptor activity
Sources:Amigo / QuickGO
Orthologs
Species	Human	Mouse
Entrez	100463482	n/a
Ensembl	ENSG00000282017; ENSG00000270672	n/a
UniProt	P0CJ73	n/a
RefSeq (mRNA)	NM_001190487	n/a
RefSeq (protein)	NP_001177416	n/a
Location (UCSC)	Chr 7: 142.67 – 142.67 Mb	n/a
PubMed search		n/a
- Wikidata
View/Edit Human

MT-RNR2-like 6 is a protein that in humans is encoded by the MTRNR2L6 gene.
