= GLCCI1 =

Protein-coding gene in the species Homo sapiens

Identifiers
- Aliases: GLCCI1, FAM117C, GCTR, GIG18, TSSN1, glucocorticoid induced 1
- External IDs: OMIM: 614283; MGI: 2179717; HomoloGene: 15773; GeneCards: GLCCI1; OMA:GLCCI1 - orthologs

Gene location (Human)
Chr.	Chromosome 7 (human)
Band	7p21.3	Start	7,968,796 bp
Band	7p21.3	End	8,094,272 bp

Gene location (Mouse)
Chr.	Chromosome 6 (mouse)
Band	6|6 A1	Start	8,509,600 bp
Band	6|6 A1	End	8,597,548 bp
RNA expression pattern
Bgee	Human / Mouse (ortholog); Top expressed in: thymus; secondary oocyte; ventricular zone; cerebellar vermis; pylorus; bone marrow cells; sperm; lower lobe of lung; tibia; thyroid gland / Top expressed in: zygote; secondary oocyte; primary oocyte; thymus; testicle; spermatid; genital tubercle; spermatocyte; tail of embryo; morula; More reference expression data
BioGPS	n/a
Orthologs
Species	Human	Mouse
Entrez	113263	170772
Ensembl	ENSG00000106415	ENSMUSG00000029638
UniProt	Q86VQ1	Q8K3I9
RefSeq (mRNA)	NM_138426	NM_001286728; NM_001286729; NM_133236
RefSeq (protein)	NP_612435	NP_001273657; NP_001273658; NP_573499
Location (UCSC)	Chr 7: 7.97 – 8.09 Mb	Chr 6: 8.51 – 8.6 Mb
PubMed search
- Wikidata
View/Edit Human	View/Edit Mouse

Glucocorticoid-induced transcript 1 protein is a protein that in humans is encoded by the GLCCI1 gene.
