= Zinc finger protein 853 =

Protein found in humans

ZNF853

Identifiers
- Aliases: ZNF853, zinc finger protein 853
- External IDs: GeneCards: ZNF853

Gene location (Human)
Chr.	Chromosome 7 (human)
Band	7p22.1	Start	6,615,610 bp
Band	7p22.1	End	6,624,290 bp
RNA expression pattern
Bgee	Human / Mouse (ortholog); Top expressed in: hypothalamus; amygdala; cingulate gyrus; anterior cingulate cortex; gastrocnemius muscle; prefrontal cortex; putamen; right frontal lobe; muscle of thigh; tibialis anterior muscle / n/a; More reference expression data
BioGPS	n/a
Orthologs
Databases	NCBI: entry; OMA: entry
Species	Human	Mouse
Entrez	54753	n/a
Ensembl	ENSG00000236609	n/a
UniProt	P0CG23	n/a
RefSeq (mRNA)	NM_017560; NM_001353546	n/a
RefSeq (protein)	NP_060030; NP_001340475	n/a
Location (UCSC)	Chr 7: 6.62 – 6.62 Mb	n/a
PubMed search		n/a
- Wikidata
View/Edit Human

Zinc finger protein 853 is a protein that in humans is encoded by the ZNF853 gene.
