= DMTF1 =

Protein-coding gene in the species Homo sapiens

Identifiers
- Aliases: DMTF1, DMP1, DMTF, MRUL, hDMP1, cyclin D binding myb like transcription factor 1
- External IDs: OMIM: 608491; MGI: 1344415; GeneCards: DMTF1
Available structures
PDB	Ortholog search: PDBe RCSB
PDB	List of PDB id codes 2LLK

Gene location (Human)
Chr.	Chromosome 7 (human)
Band	7q21.12	Start	87,152,361 bp
Band	7q21.12	End	87,196,337 bp

Gene location (Mouse)
Chr.	Chromosome 5 (mouse)
Band	5|5 A1	Start	9,168,801 bp
Band	5|5 A1	End	9,211,776 bp
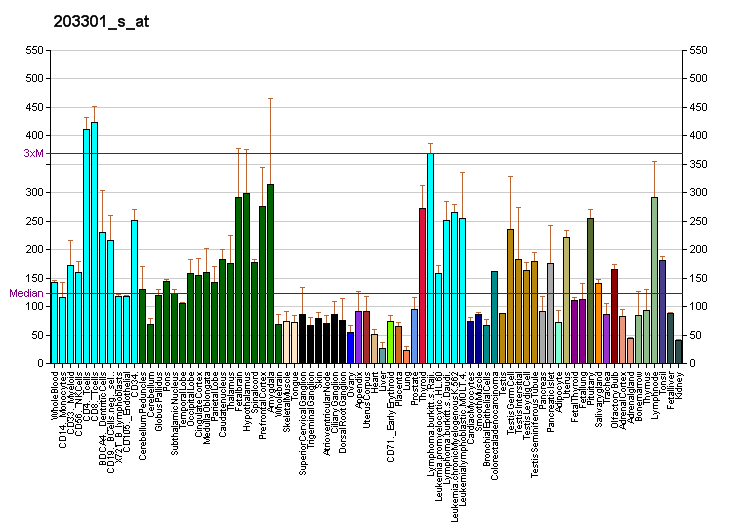
RNA expression pattern
Bgee	Human / Mouse (ortholog); Top expressed in: right lobe of thyroid gland; left lobe of thyroid gland; right ovary; left ovary; right uterine tube; body of uterus; Achilles tendon; right hemisphere of cerebellum; canal of the cervix; ventricular zone / Top expressed in: Rostral migratory stream; genital tubercle; tail of embryo; saccule; dermis; cerebellar vermis; human fetus; lobe of cerebellum; granulocyte; spermatid; More reference expression data
BioGPS	More reference expression data
Gene ontology
Molecular function	DNA-binding transcription factor activity; DNA binding; sequence-specific DNA binding; DNA-binding transcription factor activity, RNA polymerase II-specific; RNA polymerase II cis-regulatory region sequence-specific DNA binding; DNA-binding transcription activator activity, RNA polymerase II-specific
Cellular component	nucleoplasm; cytosol; nucleus
Biological process	cell cycle; regulation of transcription, DNA-templated; transcription, DNA-templated; regulation of transcription by RNA polymerase II; cell differentiation; positive regulation of transcription by RNA polymerase II
Sources:Amigo / QuickGO
Orthologs
Databases	NCBI: entry; OMA: entry
Species	Human	Mouse
Entrez	9988	23857
Ensembl	ENSG00000135164	ENSMUSG00000042508
UniProt	Q9Y222	Q8CE22
RefSeq (mRNA)	NM_001142326; NM_001142327; NM_021145	NM_001110327; NM_011806
RefSeq (protein)	NP_001135798; NP_001135799; NP_066968	NP_001103797; NP_035936
Location (UCSC)	Chr 7: 87.15 – 87.2 Mb	Chr 5: 9.17 – 9.21 Mb
PubMed search
- Wikidata
View/Edit Human	View/Edit Mouse

Cyclin-D-binding Myb-like transcription factor 1 is a protein that in humans is encoded by the DMTF1 gene.
