= STEAP4 =

Protein-coding gene in the species Homo sapiens

Identifiers
- Aliases: STEAP4, STAMP2, TIARP, TNFAIP9, STEAP4 metalloreductase, SchLAH
- External IDs: OMIM: 611098; MGI: 1923560; HomoloGene: 36422; GeneCards: STEAP4; OMA:STEAP4 - orthologs

Gene location (Human)
Chr.	Chromosome 7 (human)
Band	7q21.12	Start	88,270,892 bp
Band	7q21.12	End	88,306,894 bp

Gene location (Mouse)
Chr.	Chromosome 5 (mouse)
Band	5|5 A1	Start	8,010,457 bp
Band	5|5 A1	End	8,032,213 bp
RNA expression pattern
Bgee	Human / Mouse (ortholog); Top expressed in: pericardium; palpebral conjunctiva; synovial joint; vena cava; skin of hip; subcutaneous adipose tissue; tail of epididymis; parietal pleura; right ventricle; bronchial epithelial cell / Top expressed in: white adipose tissue; sciatic nerve; mammary gland; left lobe of liver; intercostal muscle; tunica adventitia of aorta; ciliary body; brown adipose tissue; trachea; iris; More reference expression data
BioGPS	n/a
Gene ontology
Molecular function	oxidoreductase activity; ferric-chelate reductase (NADPH) activity; metal ion binding; cupric reductase activity; electron transfer activity; heme binding; FAD binding
Cellular component	integral component of membrane; Golgi membrane; plasma membrane; extracellular exosome; membrane; endosome; integral component of plasma membrane; Golgi apparatus; early endosome membrane
Biological process	iron ion homeostasis; copper ion import; ion transport; fat cell differentiation; iron ion import across cell outer membrane; transport; electron transport chain; protein homotrimerization
Sources:Amigo / QuickGO
Orthologs
Species	Human	Mouse
Entrez	79689	117167
Ensembl	ENSG00000127954	ENSMUSG00000012428
UniProt	Q687X5	Q923B6
RefSeq (mRNA)	NM_024636; NM_001205315; NM_001205316	NM_054098
RefSeq (protein)	NP_001192244; NP_001192245; NP_078912	NP_473439
Location (UCSC)	Chr 7: 88.27 – 88.31 Mb	Chr 5: 8.01 – 8.03 Mb
PubMed search
- Wikidata
View/Edit Human	View/Edit Mouse

STEAP family member 4 is a protein that in humans is encoded by the STEAP4 gene.

== Function ==
The protein encoded by this gene belongs to the STEAP (six transmembrane epithelial antigen of prostate) family, and resides in the golgi apparatus. It functions as a metalloreductase that has the ability to reduce both Fe(3+) to Fe(2+) and Cu(2+) to Cu(1+), using NAD(+) as acceptor. Studies in mice and human suggest that this gene may be involved in adipocyte development and metabolism, and may contribute to the normal biology of the prostate cell, as well as prostate cancer progression. Alternatively spliced transcript variants encoding different isoforms have been found for this gene
