= NOM1 =

Protein-coding gene in the species Homo sapiens

Identifiers
- Aliases: NOM1, C7orf3, PPP1R113, SGD1, nucleolar protein with MIF4G domain 1
- External IDs: OMIM: 611269; MGI: 1861749; GeneCards: NOM1

Gene location (Human)
Chr.	Chromosome 7 (human)
Band	7q36.3	Start	156,949,712 bp
Band	7q36.3	End	156,973,176 bp

Gene location (Mouse)
Chr.	Chromosome 5 (mouse)
Band	5 B1|5 15.0 cM	Start	29,639,662 bp
Band	5 B1|5 15.0 cM	End	29,662,841 bp
RNA expression pattern
Bgee	Human / Mouse (ortholog); Top expressed in: pancreatic epithelial cell; visceral pleura; germinal epithelium; parietal pleura; gingival epithelium; body of pancreas; skin of abdomen; epithelium of colon; skin of leg; gonad / Top expressed in: spermatocyte; epiblast; ovary; ventricular zone; placenta; spermatid; liver; ganglionic eminence; tail of embryo; thymus; More reference expression data
BioGPS	n/a
Gene ontology
Molecular function	protein binding; RNA binding
Cellular component	nucleolus; nucleus
Biological process	neurogenesis; ribosomal small subunit biogenesis; hair follicle maturation; biological process
Sources:Amigo / QuickGO
Orthologs
Databases	NCBI: entry; OMA: entry
Species	Human	Mouse
Entrez	64434	433864
Ensembl	ENSG00000146909	ENSMUSG00000001569
UniProt	Q5C9Z4	Q3UFM5
RefSeq (mRNA)	NM_138400; NM_001353366	NM_001033457
RefSeq (protein)	NP_612409; NP_001340295	NP_001028629
Location (UCSC)	Chr 7: 156.95 – 156.97 Mb	Chr 5: 29.64 – 29.66 Mb
PubMed search
- Wikidata
View/Edit Human	View/Edit Mouse

Nucleolar protein with MIF4G domain 1 is a protein that in humans is encoded by the NOM1 gene.

Proteins that contain MIF4G (middle of eIF4G (MIM 600495)) and/or MA3 domains, such as NOM1, function in protein translation. These domains include binding sites for members of the EIF4A family of ATP-dependent DEAD box RNA helicases.
