= PHTF2 =

Protein-coding gene in the species Homo sapiens

Identifiers
- Aliases: PHTF2, putative homeodomain transcription factor 2
- External IDs: OMIM: 616785; MGI: 1916020; GeneCards: PHTF2

Gene location (Human)
Chr.	Chromosome 7 (human)
Band	7q11.23-q21.11	Start	77,798,773 bp
Band	7q11.23-q21.11	End	77,957,503 bp

Gene location (Mouse)
Chr.	Chromosome 5 (mouse)
Band	5|5 A3	Start	20,758,663 bp
Band	5|5 A3	End	20,882,124 bp
RNA expression pattern
Bgee	Human / Mouse (ortholog); Top expressed in: tibia; Skeletal muscle tissue of rectus abdominis; biceps brachii; Skeletal muscle tissue of biceps brachii; triceps brachii muscle; glutes; thoracic diaphragm; amniotic fluid; vastus lateralis muscle; deltoid muscle / Top expressed in: plantaris muscle; extensor digitorum longus muscle; cardiac muscle tissue of left ventricle; secondary oocyte; muscle of thigh; soleus muscle; quadriceps femoris muscle; zygote; sternocleidomastoid muscle; primary oocyte; More reference expression data
BioGPS	n/a
Gene ontology
Molecular function	DNA binding
Cellular component	endoplasmic reticulum; nucleus
Biological process	regulation of transcription, DNA-templated; transcription, DNA-templated
Sources:Amigo / QuickGO
Orthologs
Databases	NCBI: entry; OMA: entry
Species	Human	Mouse
Entrez	57157	68770
Ensembl	ENSG00000006576	ENSMUSG00000039987
UniProt	Q8N3S3	Q8CB19
RefSeq (mRNA)	NM_001127357; NM_001127358; NM_001127359; NM_001127360; NM_020432 NM_001366081; NM_001366082; NM_001366083; NM_001366084; NM_001366085; NM_001366086; NM_001366087; NM_001366088; NM_001366089; NM_001395270; NM_001395271; NM_001395272	NM_172992
RefSeq (protein)	NP_001120829; NP_001120830; NP_001120831; NP_001120832; NP_065165 NP_001353010; NP_001353011; NP_001353012; NP_001353013; NP_001353014; NP_001353015; NP_001353016; NP_001353017; NP_001353018	NP_766580
Location (UCSC)	Chr 7: 77.8 – 77.96 Mb	Chr 5: 20.76 – 20.88 Mb
PubMed search
- Wikidata
View/Edit Human	View/Edit Mouse

Putative homeodomain transcription factor 2 is a protein that in humans is encoded by the PHTF2 gene.
