= RADIL =

Protein-coding gene in the species Homo sapiens

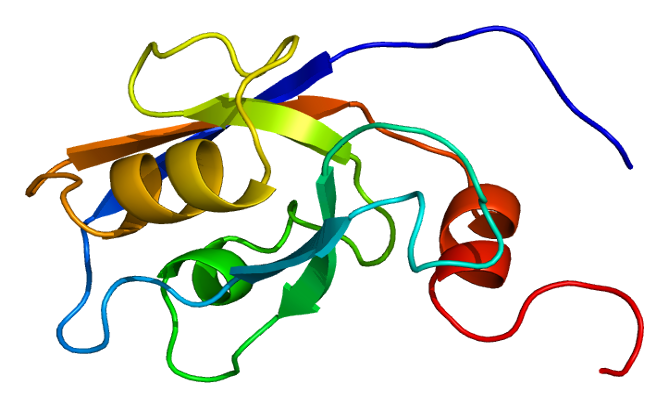

Identifiers
- Aliases: RADIL, RASIP2, Rap associating with DIL domain
- External IDs: OMIM: 611491; MGI: 2443088; GeneCards: RADIL
Available structures
PDB	Ortholog search: PDBe RCSB
PDB	List of PDB id codes 1UM1, 3EC8

Gene location (Human)
Chr.	Chromosome 7 (human)
Band	7p22.1	Start	4,797,055 bp
Band	7p22.1	End	4,883,716 bp

Gene location (Mouse)
Chr.	Chromosome 5 (mouse)
Band	5|5 G2	Start	142,470,594 bp
Band	5|5 G2	End	142,536,853 bp
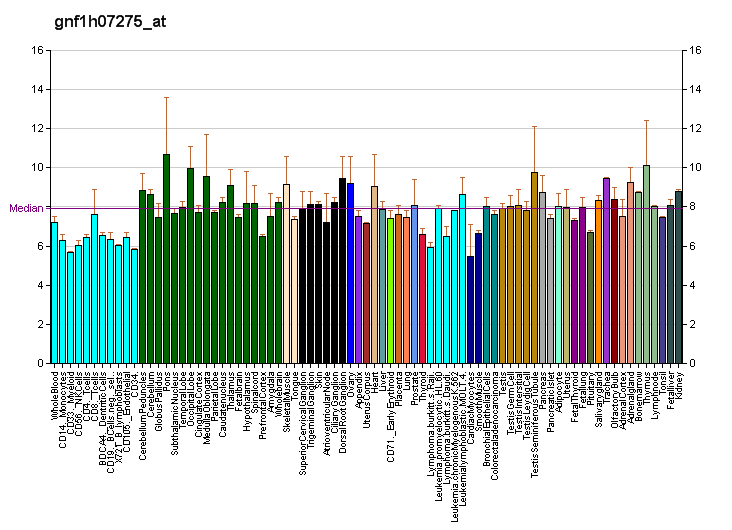
RNA expression pattern
Bgee	Human / Mouse (ortholog); Top expressed in: oocyte; secondary oocyte; cerebellar vermis; gonad; right hemisphere of cerebellum; right testis; left testis; pons; tibial nerve; sural nerve / Top expressed in: habenula; seminiferous tubule; spermatocyte; cerebellar cortex; superior cervical ganglion; atrium; dorsomedial hypothalamic nucleus; superior frontal gyrus; lobe of cerebellum; lateral septal nucleus; More reference expression data
BioGPS	More reference expression data
Gene ontology
Molecular function	protein binding
Cellular component	microtubule; protein-containing complex
Biological process	multicellular organism development; substrate adhesion-dependent cell spreading; cell adhesion; signal transduction
Sources:Amigo / QuickGO
Orthologs
Databases	NCBI: entry; OMA: entry
Species	Human	Mouse
Entrez	55698	231858
Ensembl	ENSG00000157927	ENSMUSG00000029576
UniProt	Q96JH8	Q69Z89
RefSeq (mRNA)	NM_018059	NM_001289588; NM_178702; NM_001310752
RefSeq (protein)	NP_060529	NP_001276517; NP_001297681; NP_848817
Location (UCSC)	Chr 7: 4.8 – 4.88 Mb	Chr 5: 142.47 – 142.54 Mb
PubMed search
- Wikidata
View/Edit Human	View/Edit Mouse

Ras-associating and dilute domain-containing protein is a protein that in humans is encoded by the RADIL gene.
