= FBXO24 =

Protein-coding gene in the species Homo sapiens

Identifiers
- Aliases: FBXO24, FBX24, F-box protein 24
- External IDs: OMIM: 609097; MGI: 1918426; GeneCards: FBXO24

Gene location (Human)
Chr.	Chromosome 7 (human)
Band	7q22.1	Start	100,583,982 bp
Band	7q22.1	End	100,601,117 bp

Gene location (Mouse)
Chr.	Chromosome 5 (mouse)
Band	5|5 G2	Start	137,610,765 bp
Band	5|5 G2	End	137,627,264 bp
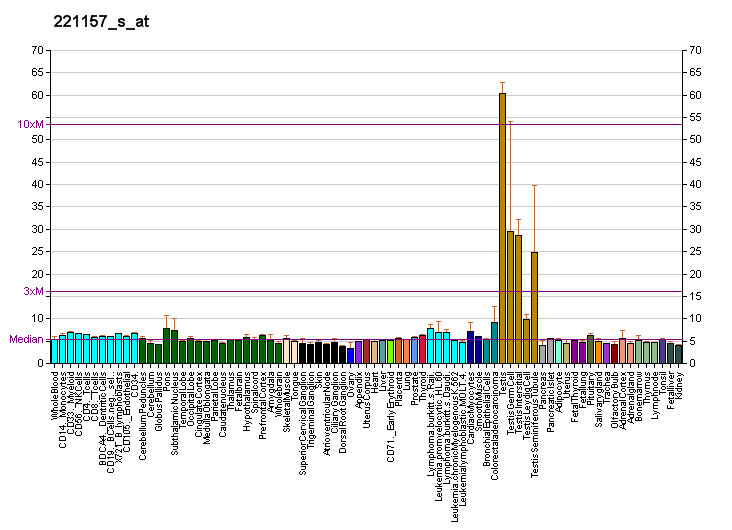
RNA expression pattern
Bgee	Human / Mouse (ortholog); Top expressed in: left testis; right testis; sperm; gonad; testicle; sural nerve; granulocyte; stromal cell of endometrium; right uterine tube; ectocervix / Top expressed in: spermatid; seminiferous tubule; granulocyte; spermatocyte; embryo; embryo; neural layer of retina; esophagus; jejunum; ventricular zone; More reference expression data
BioGPS	More reference expression data
Gene ontology
Molecular function	ubiquitin-protein transferase activity; protein binding
Cellular component	ubiquitin ligase complex
Biological process	protein ubiquitination
Sources:Amigo / QuickGO
Orthologs
Databases	NCBI: entry; OMA: entry
Species	Human	Mouse
Entrez	26261	71176
Ensembl	ENSG00000106336	ENSMUSG00000089984
UniProt	O75426	Q9D417
RefSeq (mRNA)	NM_001163499; NM_012172; NM_033506	NM_027708
RefSeq (protein)	NP_001156971; NP_036304; NP_277041	NP_081984
Location (UCSC)	Chr 7: 100.58 – 100.6 Mb	Chr 5: 137.61 – 137.63 Mb
PubMed search
- Wikidata
View/Edit Human	View/Edit Mouse

F-box only protein 24 is a protein that in humans is encoded by the FBXO24 gene.

This gene encodes a member of the F-box protein family which is characterized by an approximately 40 amino acid motif, the F-box. The F-box proteins constitute one of the four subunits of the ubiquitin protein ligase complex called SCFs (SKP1-cullin-F-box), which function in phosphorylation-dependent ubiquitination. The F-box proteins are divided into 3 classes: Fbws containing WD-40 domains, Fbls containing leucine-rich repeats, and Fbxs containing either different protein-protein interaction modules or no recognizable motifs. The protein encoded by this gene belongs to the Fbxs class. Alternative splicing of this gene generates two transcript variants.
