= ACTR3B =

Gene of the species Homo sapiens

Identifiers
- Aliases: ACTR3B, ARP11, ARP3BETA, ARP3 actin-related protein 3 homolog B (yeast)
- External IDs: MGI: 2661120; GeneCards: ACTR3B

Gene location (Mouse)
Chr.	Chromosome 5 (mouse)
Band	5|5 B1	Start	25,964,995 bp
Band	5|5 B1	End	26,055,686 bp
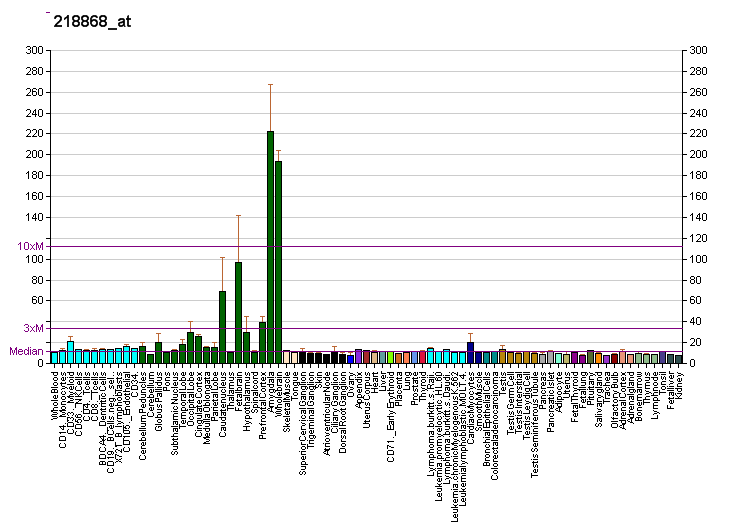
RNA expression pattern
Bgee	Human / Mouse (ortholog); n/a / Top expressed in: hippocampus proper; dorsal striatum; olfactory tubercle; dentate gyrus; visual cortex; dentate gyrus of hippocampal formation granule cell; superior frontal gyrus; primary visual cortex; piriform cortex; subdivision of hippocampus
BioGPS	More reference expression data
Gene ontology
Molecular function	ATP binding; nucleotide binding; actin binding; molecular function; actin filament binding
Cellular component	Arp2/3 Protein Complex; cell projection; cytoplasm; cytoskeleton; extracellular exosome
Biological process	actin filament organization; Arp2/3 complex-mediated actin nucleation; biological process
Sources:Amigo / QuickGO
Orthologs
Databases	NCBI: entry; OMA: entry
Species	Human	Mouse
Entrez	57180	242894
Ensembl	ENSG00000133627	ENSMUSG00000056367
UniProt	Q9P1U1	Q641P0
RefSeq (mRNA)	NM_001040135; NM_020445	NM_001004365; NM_001310504
RefSeq (protein)	NP_001035225; NP_065178; NP_001337869; NP_001337870; NP_001337871 NP_001337872; NP_001337873; NP_001337874; NP_001337875	NP_001004365; NP_001297433
Location (UCSC)	n/a	Chr 5: 25.96 – 26.06 Mb
PubMed search
- Wikidata
View/Edit Human	View/Edit Mouse

Actin-related protein 3B also known as ARP3-beta is a protein that in humans is encoded by the ACTR3B gene. Pseudogenes of this gene are located on chromosomes 2, 4, 10, 16, 22 and Y. Alternative splicing results in multiple transcript variants and protein isoforms.

== Function ==
This gene encodes a member of the actin-related proteins (ARP), which form multiprotein complexes and share 35-55% amino acid identity with conventional actin. The protein encoded by this gene may have a regulatory role in the actin cytoskeleton and induce cell-shape change and motility.
