= Homeobox a cluster =

Protein found in humans

HOXA@

Identifiers
- Aliases: HOXA@, HOX1@, homeobox A cluster
- External IDs: GeneCards: HOXA@; OMA:HOXA@ - orthologs
Orthologs
| Species | Human | Mouse |
| Entrez | 3197 | n/a |
| Ensembl | n/a | n/a |
| UniProt | n a | n/a |
| RefSeq (mRNA) | n/a | n/a |
| RefSeq (protein) | n/a | n/a |
| Location (UCSC) | n/a | n/a |
| PubMed search | | n/a |
- Wikidata
| View/Edit Human |

Homeobox A cluster is a protein that in humans is encoded by the HOXA@ gene.
