= MyoD family inhibitor domain containing =

Protein-coding gene in the species Homo sapiens

An Error has occurred retrieving Wikidata item for infobox

MyoD family inhibitor domain containing is a protein that in humans is encoded by the MDFIC gene.

== Function ==
This gene product is a member of a family of proteins characterized by a specific cysteine-rich C-terminal domain, which is involved in transcriptional regulation of viral genome expression. Alternative translation initiation from an upstream non-AUG (GUG), and an in-frame, downstream AUG codon, results in the production of two isoforms, p40 and p32, respectively, which have different subcellular localization; p32 is mainly found in the cytoplasm, whereas p40 is targeted to the nucleolus. Both isoforms have transcriptional regulatory activity that is attributable to the cysteine-rich C-terminal domain. Alternative splicing results in multiple transcript variants.
