= Prostate cancer, hereditary, 4 =

Genetic element in the species Homo sapiens

HPC4

Identifiers
- Aliases: HPC7Prostate cancerhereditary4
- External IDs: GeneCards: ; OMA:- orthologs
Orthologs
| Species | Human | Mouse |
| Entrez | 408260 | n/a |
| Ensembl | n/a | n/a |
| UniProt | n a | n/a |
| RefSeq (mRNA) | n/a | n/a |
| RefSeq (protein) | n/a | n/a |
| Location (UCSC) | n/a | n/a |
| PubMed search | | n/a |
- Wikidata
| View/Edit Human |

Prostate cancer, hereditary, 4 is a protein that in humans is encoded by the HPC4 gene.
