= HOXA10-HOXA9 =

Non-coding RNA in the species Homo sapiens

HOXA10-HOXA9 readthrough is a gene that is unlikely to produce a protein product.

== Function ==
This locus represents naturally occurring read-through transcription between the neighboring HOXA10 (homeobox A10) and HOXA9 (full description written out) genes on chromosome 7. The read-through transcript is a candidate for nonsense-mediated mRNA decay (NMD), and is unlikely to produce a protein product. [provided by RefSeq, Mar 2011].
