= XKR5 =

Protein-coding gene in humans

Identifiers
- Aliases: XKR5, HARL2754, UNQ2754, XRG5A, XRG5BM, XK related 5
- External IDs: MGI: 2442327; GeneCards: XKR5

Gene location (Human)
| Chr. | Chromosome 8 (human) |
| Band | 8p23.1 | Start | 6,808,517 bp |
| Band | 8p23.1 | End | 6,835,524 bp |

Gene location (Mouse)
| Chr. | Chromosome 8 (mouse) |
| Band | 8|8 A1.3 | Start | 18,982,745 bp |
| Band | 8|8 A1.3 | End | 19,000,991 bp |
RNA expression pattern
| Bgee | Human / Mouse (ortholog); Top expressed in: stromal cell of endometrium; gonad; ventricular zone; ganglionic eminence; smooth muscle tissue; canal of the cervix; myometrium; bone marrow; placenta; body of uterus / Top expressed in: epiblast; granulocyte; gastrula; embryo; vas deferens; primitive streak; tail of embryo; ventricular zone; atrium; genital tubercle; More reference expression data |
| BioGPS | n/a |
Orthologs
| Databases | NCBI: entry; OMA: entry |
| Species | Human | Mouse |
| Entrez | 389610 | 319581 |
| Ensembl | ENSG00000275591; ENSG00000285327 | ENSMUSG00000039814 |
| UniProt | Q6UX68 | Q5GH66 |
| RefSeq (mRNA) | NM_001289973; NM_207411 | NM_001113350; NM_001286469; NM_176951 |
| RefSeq (protein) | NP_001276902; NP_997294 | NP_001106821; NP_001273398; NP_795925 |
| Location (UCSC) | Chr 8: 6.81 – 6.84 Mb | Chr 8: 18.98 – 19 Mb |
| PubMed search |
- Wikidata
| View/Edit Human | View/Edit Mouse |

XK, Kell blood group complex subunit-related family, member 5 is a protein that in humans is encoded by the XKR5 gene.
