= IQCE =

Protein-coding gene in the species Homo sapiens

Identifiers
- Aliases: IQCE, 1700028P05Rik, IQ motif containing E, PAPA7
- External IDs: OMIM: 617631; MGI: 1921489; HomoloGene: 49912; GeneCards: IQCE; OMA:IQCE - orthologs

Gene location (Human)
Chr.	Chromosome 7 (human)
Band	7p22.3	Start	2,558,972 bp
Band	7p22.3	End	2,614,733 bp

Gene location (Mouse)
Chr.	Chromosome 5 (mouse)
Band	5|5 G2	Start	140,647,582 bp
Band	5|5 G2	End	140,688,133 bp
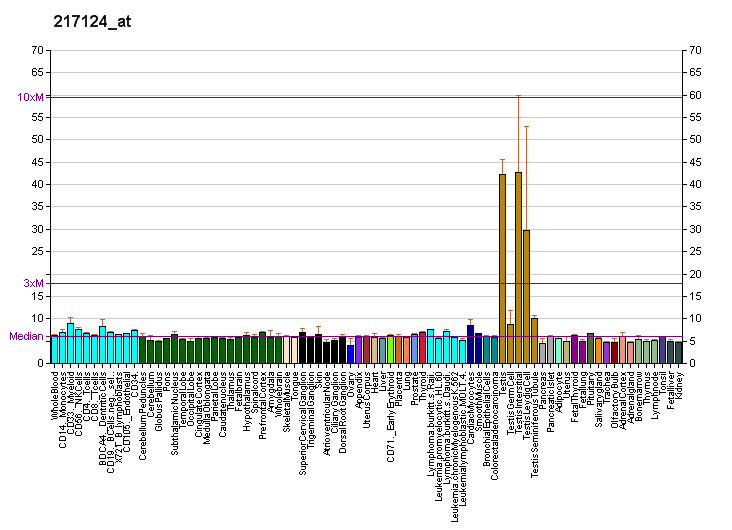
RNA expression pattern
Bgee	Human / Mouse (ortholog); Top expressed in: left testis; right testis; sural nerve; bronchial epithelial cell; right uterine tube; mucosa of paranasal sinus; olfactory zone of nasal mucosa; C1 segment; pituitary gland; anterior pituitary / Top expressed in: spermatid; spermatocyte; otolith organ; utricle; hand; neural layer of retina; otic vesicle; internal carotid artery; seminiferous tubule; external carotid artery; More reference expression data
BioGPS	More reference expression data
Gene ontology
Molecular function	protein binding
Cellular component	cilium; plasma membrane; membrane; cell projection; ciliary membrane
Biological process	limb morphogenesis
Sources:Amigo / QuickGO
Orthologs
Species	Human	Mouse
Entrez	23288	74239
Ensembl	ENSG00000106012	ENSMUSG00000036555
UniProt	Q6IPM2	Q6PCQ0
RefSeq (mRNA)	NM_001100390; NM_001287499; NM_001287500; NM_001287501; NM_001287502 NM_152558	NM_028833; NM_001347517
RefSeq (protein)	NP_001274428; NP_001274429; NP_001274430; NP_001274431; NP_689771	NP_001334446; NP_083109
Location (UCSC)	Chr 7: 2.56 – 2.61 Mb	Chr 5: 140.65 – 140.69 Mb
PubMed search
- Wikidata
View/Edit Human	View/Edit Mouse

IQ domain-containing protein E is a protein that in humans is encoded by the IQCE gene.
