= TRGV1 =

Pseudogene in the species Homo sapiens

T cell receptor gamma variable 1 (non-functional) is a protein that in humans is encoded by the TRGV1 gene.
