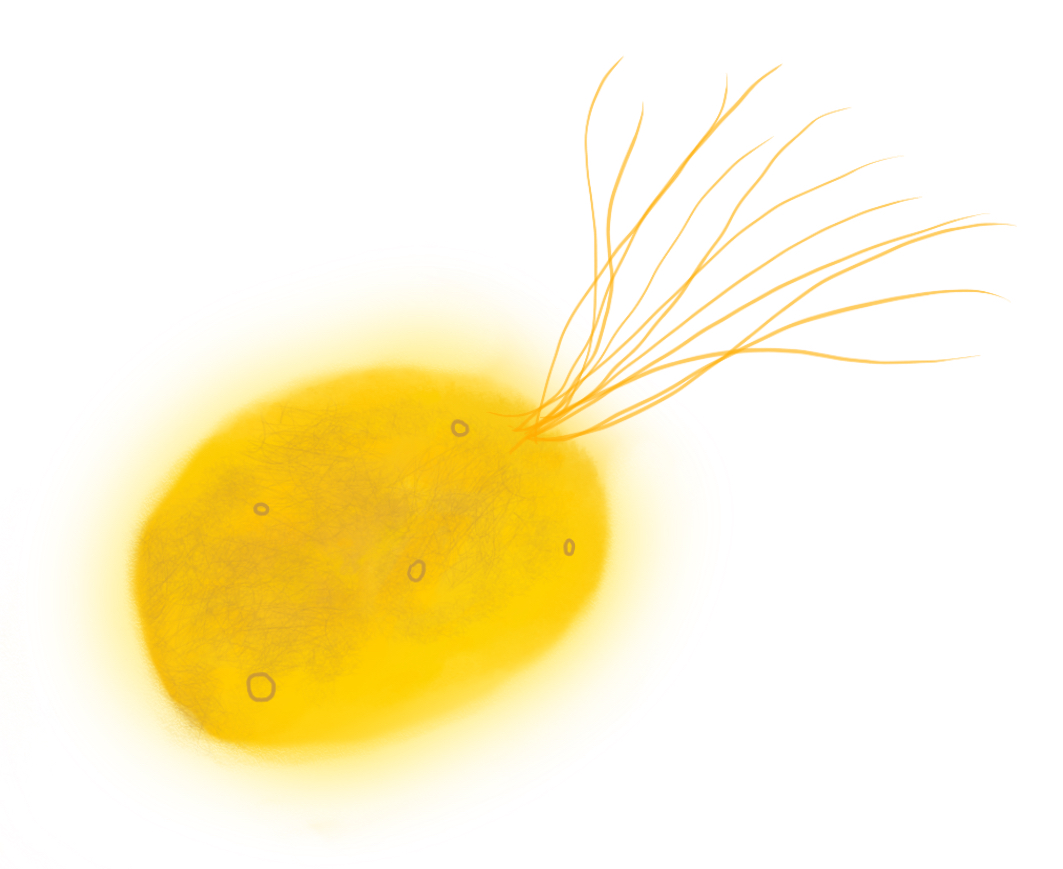
- Representative image of Pyrococcus yayanosii

Scientific classification
- Domain: Archaea
- Kingdom: Methanobacteriati
- Phylum: Methanobacteriota
- Class: Thermococci
- Order: Thermococcales
- Family: Thermococcaceae
- Genus: Pyrococcus
- Species: P. yayanosii

Binomial name
- Pyrococcus yayanosii Aristides Yayanos

= Pyrococcus yayanosii =

Anaerobic, hyperthermophilic archaeon

Pyrococcus yayanosii is a strictly anaerobic, hyperthermophilic archaeon, first identified through samples from the Mid-Atlantic Ridge. Isolated from a deep-sea hydrothermal vent, it is characterized as a motile Gram-negative marine archaeon that is roughly cocci shaped and 1-1.5 μm in diameter, with lophotrichous flagellation. As the current most thermophilic species within the order of Thermococcales, P. yayanosii exhibit various selective conditions for growth, including high pressures and temperatures, with an average doubling time of 50 minutes. Genome analysis reveal a 49 percent guanine-cytosine DNA content with Pyrococcus furiosus being its closest species relative.

Pyrococcus yayanosii are unicellular organisms that are salt-dependent, residing in environments that exhibit moderate concentrations of NaCl. Through utilizing an anaerobic growth method, P. yayanosii is capable of using various simple and complex substrates for fermentation. While this pathway results in slower growth rates compared to aerobic metabolism, elemental sulfur has been found to promote growth for this species. Similar to some hydrothermal vent microbes, P. yayanosii employs sulfur assimilation in facilitating biological processes, thereby producing byproducts such as 3'-Phosphoadenosine 5'-monophosphate (pAp).

== History ==
=== Initial isolation ===
Pyrococcus yayanosii was originally isolated by Birrien et al. (2011) on the Serpentine cruise of March 2007 in the Central Equatorial Atlantic. The research team collected black smoker samples at a depth of 4100m on the Mid-Atlantic Ridge, specifically at the Ashadze site, an active hydrothermal vent field.

Due to the strict conditions of P. yayanosii for growth, special care was taken to incubate the samples anaerobically at an optimal pressure of 52 MPa and temperature of 98 °C. Growth of an isolated colony designated as strain CH1^{T} was observed after two days under these conditions. The cloning and sequencing of the 16S rRNA gene, as well as microscopic observation, verified the purity of the CH1^{T} isolate.

After purity confirmation, a light microscope was used to observe the isolated strain CH1^{T}. Certain traits were being screened for, as Pyrococcus species are known for their characteristic spherical (cocci) shape as well as their flagellar motility. The cells of CH1^{T} appeared to resemble irregular cocci shapes and were observed frequently as single cells or in pairs, or infrequently in a line formation. The researchers also noticed that individual cells were especially motile. This finding prompted the use of a Spot Test Flagella kit, which confirmed the presence of a polar spot of flagella. Other tests performed included the Gram stain (which is highly unreliable in archaea), varied substrate utilization assays, and direct cell counting. These tests characterized Pyrococccus yayanosii as a gram-negative bacterium with the ability to metabolize proteinaceous substrates and carbohydrates for energy and release hydrogen sulfide.

=== Classification ===
Cells of strain CH1^{T} were harvested in their peak growth phase, followed by DNA being isolated by chemical extraction. Through amplification, sequencing and analysis of the 16S rRNA gene, strain CH1^{T} was classified to belong within the genus Pyrococcus, sharing a gene sequence most similar to Pyrococcus furiosus.

Birrien et al. (2011) compared the DNA sequences of three Pyrococcus reference species (P. furiosus, P. abyssi, P. horikoshii) to the DNA isolated from strain CH1T and found that the DNA similarity values between them were significantly lower than the similarity values between the two distinct species P. abyssi and P. horikoshii. This provided evidence that strain CH1^{T} itself was a distinct species, and thus was named Pyrococcus yayanosii, in honour of a pioneer in microbiological research, Aristides Yayanos, who specialized in the study of piezophilic bacteria.

=== Advancements ===
The discovery of P. yayanosii opened many doors for broader future research. As P. yayanosii is both an obligate piezophile and hyperthermophile, the organism is an attractive model for studying early life evolution and the biochemical strategies underlying piezophilic adaptation. In 2014, Li et al. generated a derivative strain, P. yayanosii A1, which is facultatively (originally obligately) piezophilic. This strain can grow under both atmospheric pressure and high-pressure conditions while maintaining similar physiology (optimal temperature, pH, and salt concentration) to wild type P. yayanosii. The ability to cultivate A1 under normal atmospheric conditions simplifies genetic manipulations. The researchers subsequently constructed several plasmids that were able to genetically manipulate the A1 strain. The transformation efficiency reached significant levels, indicating an effective system for gene disruption. This system can be applied in future studies on the functional genomics of P. yayanosii. Consequently, it would further allow researchers to investigate the molecular mechanisms that underpin piezophilic and hyperthermophilic adaptation, potentially providing insights into early life evolution and the adaptation of microorganisms to extreme environments.

== Optimal conditions and adaptation to high pressures ==
=== Environment and general conditions ===
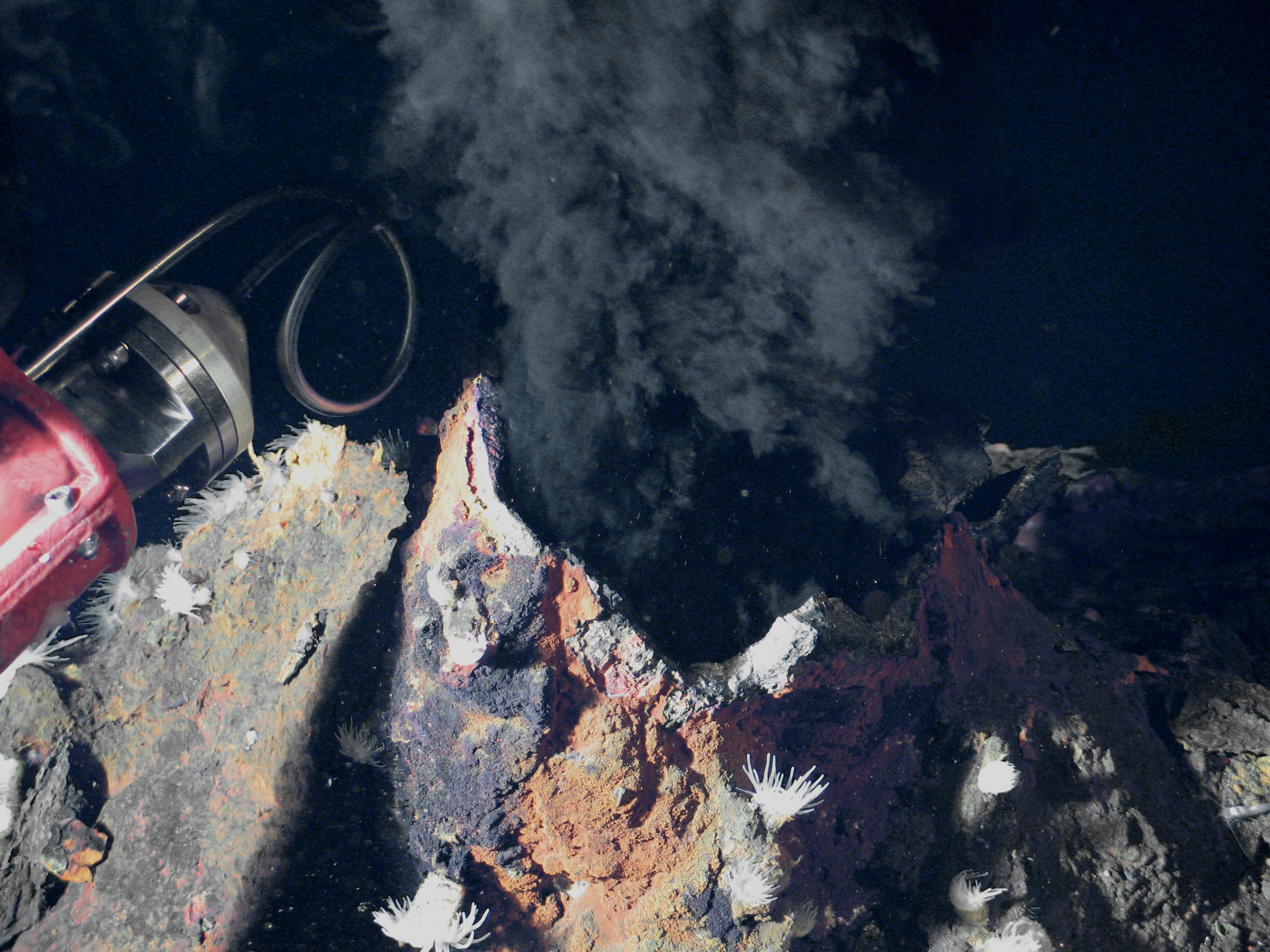
Black smoker in the Ashadze Hydrothermal Vent

Isolated from the deepest hydrothermal vent field explored to date, P. yayanosii is a strictly anaerobic organism adapted to a deep ocean, seawater environment lacking oxygen. It is considered an extremophile as it grows under high temperatures and high pressures.

=== Optimal conditions ===
Incubation experiments of P. yayanosii allowed identification of its optimal conditions. The specific strain CH1^{T} was found to have an optimal temperature of 98 °C despite being capable of growing at temperatures between 80 and 108 °C. Similarly, while this strain exhibits optimal growth at a pH of around 7.5 to 8, it is capable of growth when exposed to a pH range between 6.0 and 9.5. It has a salinity optimum nearing 3.5% in weight by volume (35 g/L, the average ocean salinity), with a range where growth is possible from 2.5 to 5.5% (25–55 g/L) An optimal pressure of 52 MPa (520 atmospheres) was identified for P. yayanosii. While some studies identified stressful pressures at 20 and 80 MPa (200–800 atmospheres), with growth rates half as great as the rate at the optimum, others observed no growth was observed for the strain CH1^{T} below 20 MPa and above 120 MPa (200–1200 atmospheres).

Other substrates were also tested as potential carbon and energy sources; P. yayanosii was able to use casein, cellobiose, sucrose, glucose, starch, chitin, pyruvate, glycerol, and acetate for fermentation. The addition of elemental sulfur also promoted its growth.

=== Adaptations to high pressure ===
Multiple mechanisms are thought allow P. yayanosii to adapt to changes in hydrostatic pressures.

First, a gene expression analysis revealed an overrepresentation of genes involved in energy production and conversion, with genes coding for ATP- and ADP-synthase, as well as hydrogenases and ferredoxin oxidoreductases. More specifically, transcriptome and proteome analyses showed that while the genes associated with hydrogenases are downregulated under stressful conditions, the proteins associated with these energy pathways are upregulated.

The hydrogenase energy pathway involves the production of protons, and it has been hypothesized that other upregulated genes associated with ATPase could contribute to maintaining pH homeostasis.

Several CRISPR-cas clusters, which are usually associated with immunity and pathogen resistance, are also regulated (either upregulated or downregulated) under stressuful pressures.

Additionally, chemotaxis genes upregulated at stressful pressure could increase the motility of the organism, which in turn is thought to help the organism seek nutrients.

Similarly, proteins associated with ribosome recycling and subunits synthesis are upregulated in stressfully high and low pressures, enhancing the synthesis and activity of proteins.

Evolutionarily, Genomic Islands (GIs) contribute to gene modification and plasticity and thereby promote the genetic diversity and adaptation of species to their environment. In P. yayanosii, 15 GIs were identified from DNA fragments. The transcription levels of the largest of these GIs, PYG1, revealed variations in gene expression under different temperature and pressure conditions. It was found to be generally nonessential but to facilitate adaptation in stressful conditions. Experiments involving removing PYG1 also highlighted a tradeoff in the adaptation to high pressure versus high temperature. This GI bears a resemblance to GIs and similar structures in other extremophilic archea such as Thermococcus barophilus and Pyrococcus abyssi.

In this GI, a potential toxin-antitoxin system was identified, with toxin gene pygT and antitoxin gene pygA. Experiments conducted using mutant strains and different pressure conditions suggested that this system might play a role in both plasmid stability and adaptation to high hydrostatic pressure.

== Proteins and enzymes ==
The genome of P. yayanosii CH1^{T} was completely sequenced, and analyses found a proteome of 1,926 proteins, 21% of which are still only hypothetical.

=== PYCH_01220 ===
PYCH_01220 is one of the hypothetical proteins with a crystal structure composed of two domains. Previous research found similarity between this protein and Escherichia coli's ribonuclease colicin D, suggesting that its potential function could be to bind the nucleic acids of DNA.

=== Pullulanase ===
A complete genome mapping of P. Yayanosii led to the discovery of a gene hypothesized to produce an amylopullulanase, referred henceforth as Pul PY. Pullulanase is responsible for debranching α-1, 6 glycosidic linkages in oligosaccharides. Subsequent NCBI Protein Blast analysis allowed researchers to deduce active site structure and homology testing showed substantial similarities to other Pyrococcus and Thermococcus species. Tests reveals that Pul PY has optimal temperature of 95 °C and is able to maintain a minimum 80% functionality around 100 °C. Pul PY functions optimally at pH 6.6 and showed significant functionality within a pH range of 5.8-8.0. Additional comparative testing for thermal stability against other thermostable enzymes found similarity with Pyrococcus woesei, proving significant thermostability.

Due to its ability to survive in extreme conditions over a long period of time, Pul PY is ideal for use in starch liquefaction. When used in conjunction with amylase, it can improve the efficiency of hydrolysis.

=== Papase ===
pApase is a type of enzyme responsible for breaking down 3′-phosphoadenosine 5′-monophosphate (pAp) into AMP and phosphate. Prior to testing P. yayanosii pApase, not much was known about the archaeal methods of pAp turnover. Inspection of the gene cluster involved in assimilatory sulfate reduction yielded PYCH_17540, which codes for pApase. Homologic testing shows that this pApase is derived from a common ancestor with NmA nucleases, which are bacterial in nature.

Testing shows that pApase functions optimally at pH 6.5, while maintaining significant performance within a pH range of 5.5-8.0. pApase shows positive linear correlation between temperature and performance within 25-90 °C, showing approximately 4 times more turnover at 90 °C compared to 25 °C. Additionally, pApase requires co-factors for optimal functionality. Cobalt is the best cofactor, being closely followed by Nickel and Manganese.

Archael pApase also has a high specificity for substrates. It is only capable of attaching to and hydrolysing cyclic nucelotides, nanoRNAs and small ssDNA.

The structure of pApase includes a DHH domain attached to a DHHA1 domain via a long α-helix, where the cleft between its domains is the active site. In comparison to bacterial pApase, the α-helix is much longer, which makes the active site smaller and thus, more substrate specific.

== Clinical significance ==
Pyrococcus yayanosii naturally possess a thermostable ferritin, PcFn, capable of withstanding high temperature exposures up to 110 °C. Understanding this protein can provide future directions clinically in developing drugs with well-maintained efficiency despite storage under higher temperatures. The synthesis of PcFn into thermostable magnetoferritins (M-PcFn) by monodispered iron oxide nanoparticles form crystalline core structures with negligible change in hydrodynamic diameters. This finding in regards to resistance to change reinforce that PcFn plays a critical role in thermostability, thereby influencing the overall properties observed in P. yayanosii. These noticeable characteristics found in M-PcFn, such as PcFn5000, offer insight on approaches that can increase thermostability of molecules and substances.

In addition to the species' resistance to molecular changes in structure, the 51st and 298th residues found in L-asparaginase II of P. yayanosii interplay in thermostability. These residues allow for molecular maintenance and increased thermostability through supporting a tightly bound C terminal, reducing surface charges at reaction regions, and retaining loop rigidity. Recognition on the influence of amino acids on heat tolerance introduce alternative perspectives into industrial applications and new findings.

== Industrial significance ==
While only the cold shock-inducible and sugar-inducible promoters were previously identified within the order Thermococcales, a recent study found a high hydrostatic pressure (HHP) inducible promoter in P. yayanosii. Given promoters are known to be regions where gene transcription occurs, identification of the HHP promoter can provide biological knowledge on the interactive dynamics between the components that allow for transcription. Hence, the proteins produced as a product of translation can introduce analysis into mechanisms that allow for tolerance to high pressure, thereby providing insight useful to improve industrial equipment.

Pyrococcus yayanosii was found to exhibit low variability with respect to the core lipids, which are essential components that determine bacterial structure and function. Given that lipids are abundant in various systems, such as biologically within cells and chemically within organic compounds, and are key determinants to heat adaptability, knowledge may be borrowed from this organism in constructing pharmaceutical products that incorporate heat resistance properties. Therefore, this finding offers new avenues of exploration that may be key to industrial development.
