= Thermococcus celer =

Scientific classification
- Domain: Archaea
- Kingdom: Methanobacteriati
- Phylum: Methanobacteriota
- Class: Thermococci
- Order: Thermococcales
- Family: Thermococcaceae
- Genus: Thermococcus
- Species: T. celer

Binomial name
- Thermococcus celer Zillig 1983

Species of archaeon

Thermococcus celer is a Gram-negative, spherical-shaped archaeon of the genus Thermococcus. The discovery of T. celer played an important role in rerooting the tree of life when T. celer was found to be more closely related to methanogenic Archaea than to other phenotypically similar thermophilic species. T. celer was the first archaeon discovered to house a circularized genome. Several type strains of T. celer have been identified: Vu13, ATCC 35543, and DSM 2476.

== Isolation ==
T. celer was discovered by Dr. Wolfram Zillig in 1983. The organism was isolated on the beaches of Vulcano, Italy, from a sulfur-rich shallow volcanic crater. Original samples were isolated from the depths of the marine holes and inoculated into 10-ml anaerobic tubes. The tubes contained 100 mg of elemental sulfur and a solution of 95% N_{2} and 5% H_{2}S. The pH was subsequently adjusted to a range of 5-6 through the addition of CaCO_{3}. To ensure that no oxygen had permeated the sample, researchers used the oxygen indicator resazurin. Growth was achieved by enrichment with Brock's Sulfolobus medium, which contains elemental sulfur and yeast, both of which are required by T. celer for optimal growth. Following enrichment, the samples were plated onto polyacrylamide gel and then incubated at 85 °C in an anaerobic environment. Once colony growth had been observed, the cells were subjected to centrifugation prior to purification in a TA buffer solution (0.05 mol/L Tris HCl, 0.022 mol/L NH_{4}Cl, 0.01 mol/L β-mercaptoethanol).

== Taxonomy and phylogeny ==
Following Sanger sequencing of the 16s rRNA, both parsimony and distance matrix analyses were performed to determine the position of T. celer on the tree of life. T. celer was found to be more closely related to the methanogenic archaebacteria than the thermophilic archaebacteria. This discovery resulted in a rerooting of the archaebacterial tree and subsequently placed T. celer in a clade with the methanogens based upon their close phylogenetic relationship. This placement was further supported following analysis of the organizational genome structure of the both species’ rRNA genes. Both Thermococcus and methanogenic archaebacteria have a tRNA spacer gene located between the 16S rRNA gene and 23S rRNA gene. This spacer gene is not found in any other thermophilic archaebacteria species.

T. celer is related to Pyrococcus woesei, both belonging to the order Thermococcales. Both are strictly anaerobic and sulphur-reducing. T. celer also shares a close relationship with Thermococcus litoralis, both belonging to the same genus, but T. celer has shown to be much more Sulphur-dependent than T. littorals.

T. celer is currently classified as a thermophilic Archaeon. Since the discovery of T. celer, the term archaebacteria has been replaced with Archaea as to reflect the most current phylogenetic relationships discovered between the organisms.

== Characterization ==
Thermococcus is constructed from two Greek nouns: therme (Greek, meaning heat), and kokkos (Greek, meaning grain or seed). Celer is derived from the Greek, meaning fast, in reference to the species' high growth rates.

=== Morphology ===
T. celer is a Gram-negative, spherical organism around 1 μm diameter. Observation using electron microscopy revealed that T. celer uses a monopolar polytrichous flagellum for movement. During replication, T. celer is condensed to a diploform shape as seen by phase contrast microscopy.

The T. celer plasma membrane possesses large amounts of glycerol diether lipids compared to relatively small amounts of diglycerol tetraether lipids. Within glycerol diether lipids, phytanyl (C_{20}) is the hydrocarbon component, and within diglycerol tetraether lipids, biphytanyl (C_{40}) is the hydrocarbon component. The cell wall, or S-layer, of T. celer functions as protection from cell lysis as a result of changes in osmotic gradients. The envelope S-layer consists of glycoprotein subunits arranged into a two-dimensional paracrystalline hexagonal structure. The T. celer cell envelope lacks muramic acid, indicating resistance to penicillin and vancomycin.

=== Metabolism ===
T. celer is a strict anaerobe that uses organotrophic metabolism in the form of peptides (i.e. from yeast extract, peptone, or tryptone) and proteins (i.e. casein) as a carbon source which are oxidized to carbon dioxide via sulphur respiration. T. celer is unable to use carbohydrates as a carbon source and is considered a sulphur-dependent organism, as it depends upon the reduction of sulphur to hydrogen sulfide for optimal growth. Though it is less efficient, T. celer is also able to use fermentation. Unlike most prokaryotes, T. celer is able to perform respiration via the Embden–Meyerhof pathway (glycolysis), though it uses an alternative route.

=== Ecology ===
Characteristic of the hyperthermophilic species, T. celer thrives in extremely hot temperatures. More specifically, it is found only in sulphur-rich, shallow volcanic craters of Vulcano, Italy. Temperatures in this specific habitat reach up to 90 °C The maximum temperature at which T. celer can grow at is 93 °C, optimum growth temperature being 88 °C. It grows best at a pH of 5.8, implying that it is mildly acidophilic. Optimal growth is also dependent on the presence of a NaCl concentration of 40 g/L, further demonstrating the high level of adaptation T. celer has evolved for its thermal marine environment.

=== Genomics ===
Construction of a physical map of T. celer Vu13 by way of restriction enzyme fragments revealed a length of 1,890 + 27 kilobases (kb). The molecular ratio of guanine to cytosine bases is roughly 56.6%. This value was determined by averaging both the GC-content acquired by high-performance liquid chromatography and melting point (T_{M}) calculations. T. celer is considered to be one of the slowest evolving archaeon species, indicating that the genome could be used as a model organism for those studying early genome characteristics.

In 1989, T. celer was the first archaeon discovered to house a circularized genome. Genome shape was determined through three separate experiments, all using restriction enzymes. The T. celer genome was digested with restriction enzymes Nhe, Spe, and Xba. Following digestion, hybridization analyses were used to determine genome shape. Probes were synthesized from cloned genes of the 16S rRNA and 23S rRNA. Both Spe and Nhe produced five fragments, all of similar shape and size. Digestion with Xba produced eight fragments. Using overlap patterns, the shape of the genome was determined to be circular.

== Application ==
The domain Archaea is currently split into three major groups consisting of the extreme thermophiles, the extreme halophiles, and the extreme thermophiles that are able to reduce sulfur (methanogens). These three groups are not believed to have arisen independently, but instead evolved from one to another.

The discovery of T. celer turned the position of the archaebacterial phylogenetic tree. It was discovered to share a closer phylogenetic relationship with methanogenic archaebacteria, as opposed its phenotypic analogue, extremely thermophilic archaebacteria. This discovery was made through sequence analysis of the 16S rRNA and resulted in a rerooting of the phylogenetic tree.

This discovery suggests that extreme thermophiles could be the earliest archaeon ancestor when considering their slow evolution patterns, as well as the distribution of extreme thermophiles into both their own grouping, as well as that of the methanogens.
