= Thermococcus peptonophilus =

Scientific classification
- Domain: Archaea
- Kingdom: Methanobacteriati
- Phylum: Methanobacteriota
- Class: Thermococci
- Order: Thermococcales
- Family: Thermococcaceae
- Genus: Thermococcus
- Species: T. peptonophilus

Binomial name
- Thermococcus peptonophilus González et al. 1996

Species of archaeon

Thermococcus peptonophilus is a fast-growing hyperthermophilic archaeon. It is coccus-shaped, obligately anaerobic and about 0.7–2 μm in diameter. It is a strict anaerobe and grows exclusively on complex substrates, such as peptone, casein, tryptone, and yeast extract. It cannot use carbon dioxide as a source of carbon. Although it can grow somewhat in the absence of elemental sulfur, it prefers sulfur.
