= Thermococcus alcaliphilus =

Scientific classification
- Domain: Archaea
- Kingdom: Methanobacteriati
- Phylum: Methanobacteriota
- Class: Thermococci
- Order: Thermococcales
- Family: Thermococcaceae
- Genus: Thermococcus
- Species: T. alcaliphilus

Binomial name
- Thermococcus alcaliphilus Keller et al. 1997

Species of archaeon

Thermococcus alcaliphilus is a hyperthermophilic archaeon. It is coccoid-shaped and heterotrophic, first isolated from a shallow marine hydrothermal system at Vulcano Island, Italy. Its type strain is AEDII12 (DSM 10322).
