= Thermococcus profundus =

Scientific classification
- Domain: Archaea
- Kingdom: Methanobacteriati
- Phylum: Methanobacteriota
- Class: Thermococci
- Order: Thermococcales
- Family: Thermococcaceae
- Genus: Thermococcus
- Species: T. profundus

Binomial name
- Thermococcus profundus Kobayashi and Horikoshi 1995

Species of archaeon

Thermococcus profundus is a hyperthermophilic archaeon isolated from a deep-sea hydrothermal vent. It is coccoid-shaped with 1–2 μm in diameter, designated as strain DT5432.

One amylase isolated from T. profundus strain DT5432 was found to function at an optimal temperature of 80 °C. The scientists who extracted it speculate that it may have applications in the starch industry because of its heat tolerance and lack of any need for metal ions.
