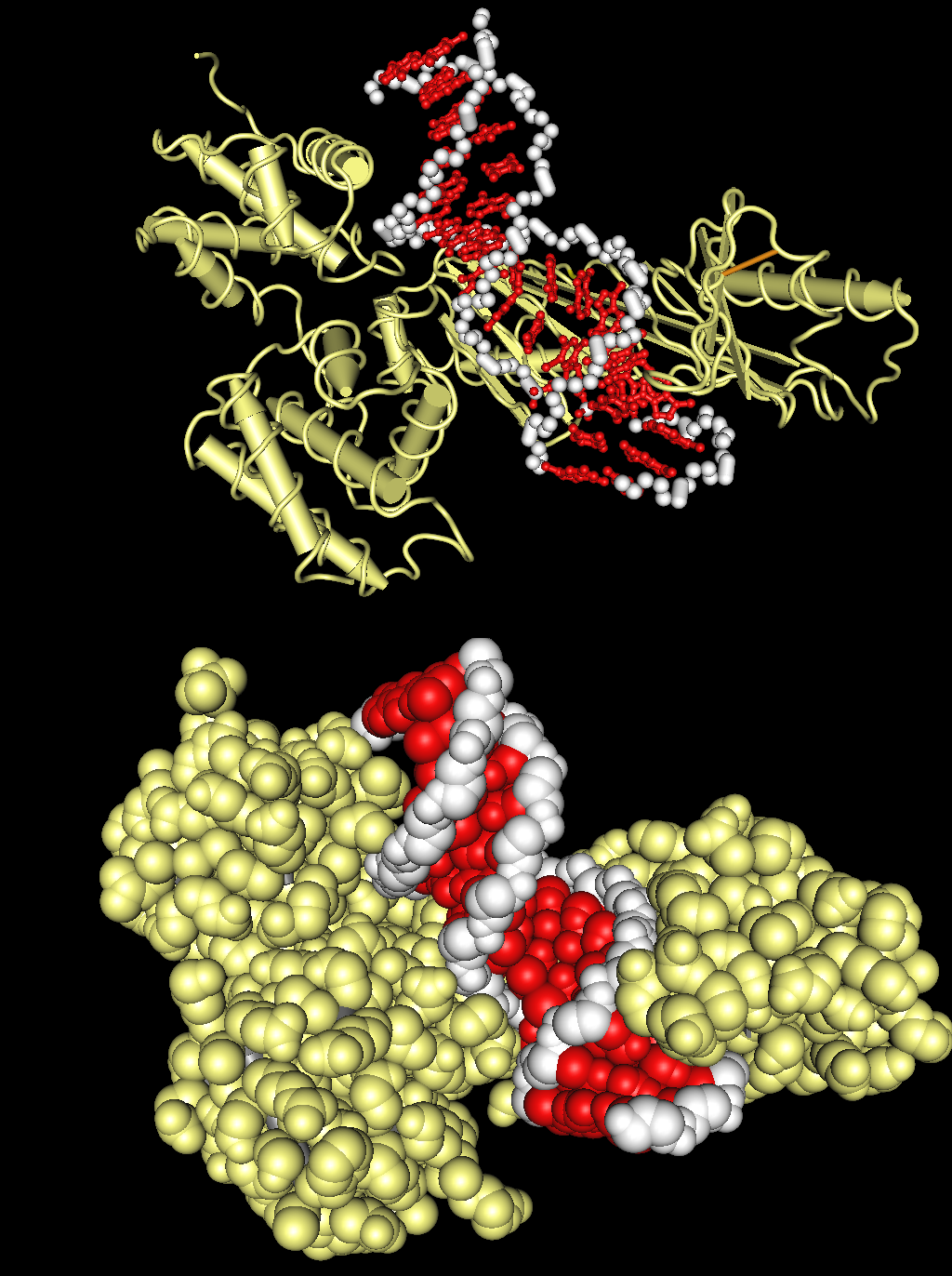

Scientific classification
- Domain: Archaea
- Kingdom: Methanobacteriati
- Phylum: Methanobacteriota
- Class: Thermococci
- Order: Thermococcales
- Family: Thermococcaceae
- Genus: Pyrococcus
- Species: P. woesei

Binomial name
- Pyrococcus woesei Zillig, 1988

= Pyrococcus woesei =

Species of archaeon

Pyrococcus woesei is an ultra-thermophilic marine archaeon. It is sulfur-reducing and grows optimally between 100 and 103 °C. Its cells have a roughly spherical, elongated and constricted appearance, similar to Thermococcus celer. Frequently, they occur as diploforms. Cells grown on solid supports have dense tufts of flagella or pili attached to one pole.

Kanoksilapatham et al. propose P. woesei as a subspecies of P. furiosus as both have the same ribosomal DNA sequence. A microarray study in 2005 found ecologically significant gene-content differences between these two species. The full genome P. woesei was sequenced in 2025. The FastANI program reports 99.5584% average nucleotide identity between this new genome (CP179867) and the P. furiosus genome (AE009950).

It is named after the discoverer of archaea as a whole - Carl Woese
