= Thermococcus hydrothermalis =

Scientific classification
- Domain: Archaea
- Kingdom: Methanobacteriati
- Phylum: Methanobacteriota
- Class: Thermococci
- Order: Thermococcales
- Family: Thermococcaceae
- Genus: Thermococcus
- Species: T. hydrothermalis

Binomial name
- Thermococcus hydrothermalis Godfroy et al. 1997

Species of archaeon

Thermococcus hydrothermalis is a hyperthermophilic archaeon. It is strictly anaerobic and coccus-shaped, and its cells range from 0.8 to 2.0 μm in diameter, with type strain AL662^{T}. It was isolated from a hydrothermal vent in the East Pacific Rise. This species is notable for its α-glucosidase, which functions optimally at a temperature of 110 °C.
