= Thermococcus barophilus =

Scientific classification
- Domain: Archaea
- Kingdom: Methanobacteriati
- Phylum: Methanobacteriota
- Class: Thermococci
- Order: Thermococcales
- Family: Thermococcaceae
- Genus: Thermococcus
- Species: T. barophilus

Binomial name
- Thermococcus barophilus Marteinsson et al. 1999

Species of archaeon

Thermococcus barophilus is a piezophilic and hyperthermophilic archaeon isolated from a deep-sea hydrothermal vent. It is anaerobic and sulfur-metabolising, with type strain MP^{T}.

== Nomenclature ==
The name Thermococcus barophilus has Greek roots, thermo for heat, kokkos for the spherical cells, baros for weight, and philos for loving. Overall, the name means "organism with a spherical body that gravitates to heat and to the pressure of the water column."

== Physiology ==
T. barophilus can grow at even higher temperatures if the pressure is high, as well. At an atmospheric pressure, it can grow at temperatures of 45–90 °C, with an optimal temperature of 85 °C, but it can grow at temperatures as high as 100 °C if the hydrostatic pressure is 15.0–17.5 MPa. Sulfur is normally necessary for its growth, but it can also grow slowly in absence of sulfur. Membrane lipid has a major archaeol component.

== Genome ==
The genome of T. barophilus has been sequenced and is circular in nature with a size of 2,010,078bp. It has also a circular plasmid pTBMP1. The genome sequence shows that it has the carboxydotrophic pathway and bears seven different hydrogenase complexes.

== Transcriptome ==
The transcriptome analysis of this organism has also been done. It has been found that, 378 genes are differentially expressed in T. barophilus under different pressure conditions. Genes related to energy production and conversion, inorganic ion transport and metabolism and carbohydrate transport and metabolism are upregulated. Genes which are downregulated are involved in amino acid transport and metabolism, nucleotide transport and metabolism, replication and repair and recombination and inorganic ion transport and metabolism.
