= Thermococcus litoralis =

Scientific classification
- Domain: Archaea
- Kingdom: Methanobacteriati
- Phylum: Methanobacteriota
- Class: Thermococci
- Order: Thermococcales
- Family: Thermococcaceae
- Genus: Thermococcus
- Species: T. litoralis

Binomial name
- Thermococcus litoralis Neuner et al. 2001

Species of archaeon

Thermococcus litoralis (T. litoralis) is a species of Archaea that is found around deep-sea hydrothermal vents as well as shallow submarine thermal springs and oil wells. It is an anaerobic organotroph hyperthermophile that is between 0.5–3.0 μm (20–118 μin) in diameter. Like the other species in the order thermococcales, T. litoralis is an irregular hyperthermophile coccus that grows between 55–100 °C (131–212 °F). Unlike many other thermococci, T. litoralis is non-motile. Its cell wall consists only of a single S-layer that does not form hexagonal lattices. Additionally, while many thermococcales obligately use sulfur as an electron acceptor in metabolism, T. litoralis only needs sulfur to help stimulate growth, and can live without it. T. litoralis has recently been popularized by the scientific community for its ability to produce an alternative DNA polymerase to the commonly used Taq polymerase. The T. litoralis polymerase, dubbed the vent polymerase, has been shown to have a lower error rate than Taq due to its proofreading 3'–5' exonuclease abilities, but higher than Pfu polymerase.

== DNA polymerase ==
DNA polymerase

Identifiers
- Organism: Thermococcus litoralis
- Symbol: pol
- UniProt: P30317
Search for
- Structures: Swiss-model
- Domains: InterPro

The DNA polymerase of Thermococcus litoralis is stable at high temperatures, with a half-life of eight hours at 95 °C (203 °F) and two hours at 100 °C (212 °F). It also has a proofreading activity that is able to reduce mutation frequencies to a level 2–4 times lower than most non-proofreading DNA polymerases. It is commercially known as the Vent DNA polymerase.

== Habitat and ecology ==
T. litoralis grows near shallow and deep sea hydrothermal vents in extremely hot water. The optimal growth temperature for T. litoralis is 85–88 °C. It also prefers slightly acidic waters, growing between pH 4.0 to 8.0 with the optimal pH between 6.0–6.4. Unlike many other hyperthermophiles, T. litoralis is only facultatively dependent on sulfur as a final electron acceptor in fermentation, producing hydrogen gas in its absence and hydrogen sulfide when present. Additionally, T. litoralis has been shown to produce an exopolysaccharide (EPS) that could possibly help it form a biofilm. It is made of mannose, sulfites, and phosphorus.

== Physiology ==
T. litoralis can utilize pyruvate, maltose, and amino acids as energy sources. In a laboratory setting, T. litoralis must be supplied with amino acids in order to grow at non-reduced rates. The only amino acids it does not require are asparagine, glutamine, alanine, and glutamate. These amino acids may not be vital for T. litoralis because asparagine and glutamine tend to deaminate at high temperatures found around hydrothermic vents and alanine and glutamate can usually be produced by other hyperthermophilic archaea. The main carbon source for T. litoralis seems to be maltose, which can be brought into the cell via a maltose-trehalose ABC transporter. T. litoralis has a specialized glycolytic pathway called the modified Embden–Meyerhoff (EM) pathway. One way the modified EM pathway in T. litoralis deviates from the common EM pathway is that the modified version contains an ADP dependent hexose kinase and PFK instead of an ATP dependent versions of the enzymes.

== Novel strains ==
New DNA analysis has shown several isolates of T. litoralis, MW and Z-1614, which are most likely new strains. MW and Z-1614 were confirmed to be strains of T. litoralis through DNA-DNA hybridization, C–G ratios (38–41 mol%), and immunoblotting analyses. They slightly differ in morphology from the previously isolated T. litoralis in that they all have flagella. Through the same processes it has been shown that the previously discovered Caldococcus litoralis was actually T. litoralis. The genome for T. litoralis has yet to be fully sequenced.
