= Thermococcus stetteri =

Scientific classification
- Domain: Archaea
- Kingdom: Methanobacteriati
- Phylum: Methanobacteriota
- Class: Thermococci
- Order: Thermococcales
- Family: Thermococcaceae
- Genus: Thermococcus
- Species: T. stetteri

Binomial name
- Thermococcus stetteri Miroshnichenko 1990

Species of archaeon

Thermococcus stetteri is an extremely thermophilic, marine, sulfur-metabolizing archaebacterium. It is anaerobic, its cells being irregular cocci 1 to 2 μm in diameter. Of the strains first isolated, two were motile due to a tuft of flagella, while the other two strains were nonmotile. Its type strain is K-3 (DSM 5262). It can grow on starch, pectin, and peptides, but not amino acids.
