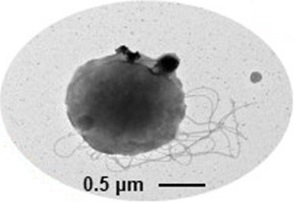
- Electron micrograph

Scientific classification
- Domain: Archaea
- Kingdom: Methanobacteriati
- Phylum: Methanobacteriota
- Class: Thermococci
- Order: Thermococcales
- Family: Thermococcaceae
- Genus: Thermococcus
- Species: T. kodakarensis

Binomial name
- Thermococcus kodakarensis Atomi et al, 2004

= Thermococcus kodakarensis =

Species of archaeon

Thermococcus kodakarensis is a species of thermophilic archaea. The type strain T. kodakarensis KOD1 is one of the best-studied members of the genus.

== History ==
T. kodakarensis was isolated from a solfatara near the shore of Kodakara Island, Kagoshima, Japan. The isolate was originally named Pyrococcus kodakarensis KOD1, but reclassified as a species of Thermococcus, based on 16S rRNA sequence. Early research with T. kodakarensis was directed mostly at its thermostable enzymes (like the KOD DNA polymerase), but its relative ease of handling and genetic manipulation facilitated by natural competence has made it an attractive system for the study of several biological processes.

== Properties ==
T. kodakarensis cells are irregular cocci 1–2 μm in diameter, often occurring in pairs, and are highly motile by means of lophotrichous archaella. The cell wall consists of a layer of diether and tetraether lipids, and an outer glycoprotein coat. T. kodakarensis is an obligate anaerobe, and a heterotroph, growing rapidly on a variety of organic substrates in the presence of elemental sulfur, producing hydrogen sulfide gas. The generation time is estimated to be 40 minutes under optimum conditions. The requirement for elemental sulfur is relieved when pyruvate or starch is used for growth. In the absence of sulfur, hydrogen is produced instead of hydrogen sulfide. Growth is possible at temperature ranging from 60–100 °C, with an optimum at 85 °C. Like other marine organisms, high salt concentrations are required for optimal growth, and cell lysis may occur in dilute solutions.

== Genome ==
In 2005, the genome of T. kodakarensis KOD1 was fully sequenced. The genome consists of a single 2,088,737 base pair circular chromosome, encoding a predicted 2306 proteins.

== See also ==
- Thermostable DNA polymerase
- Pyrococcus furiosus
