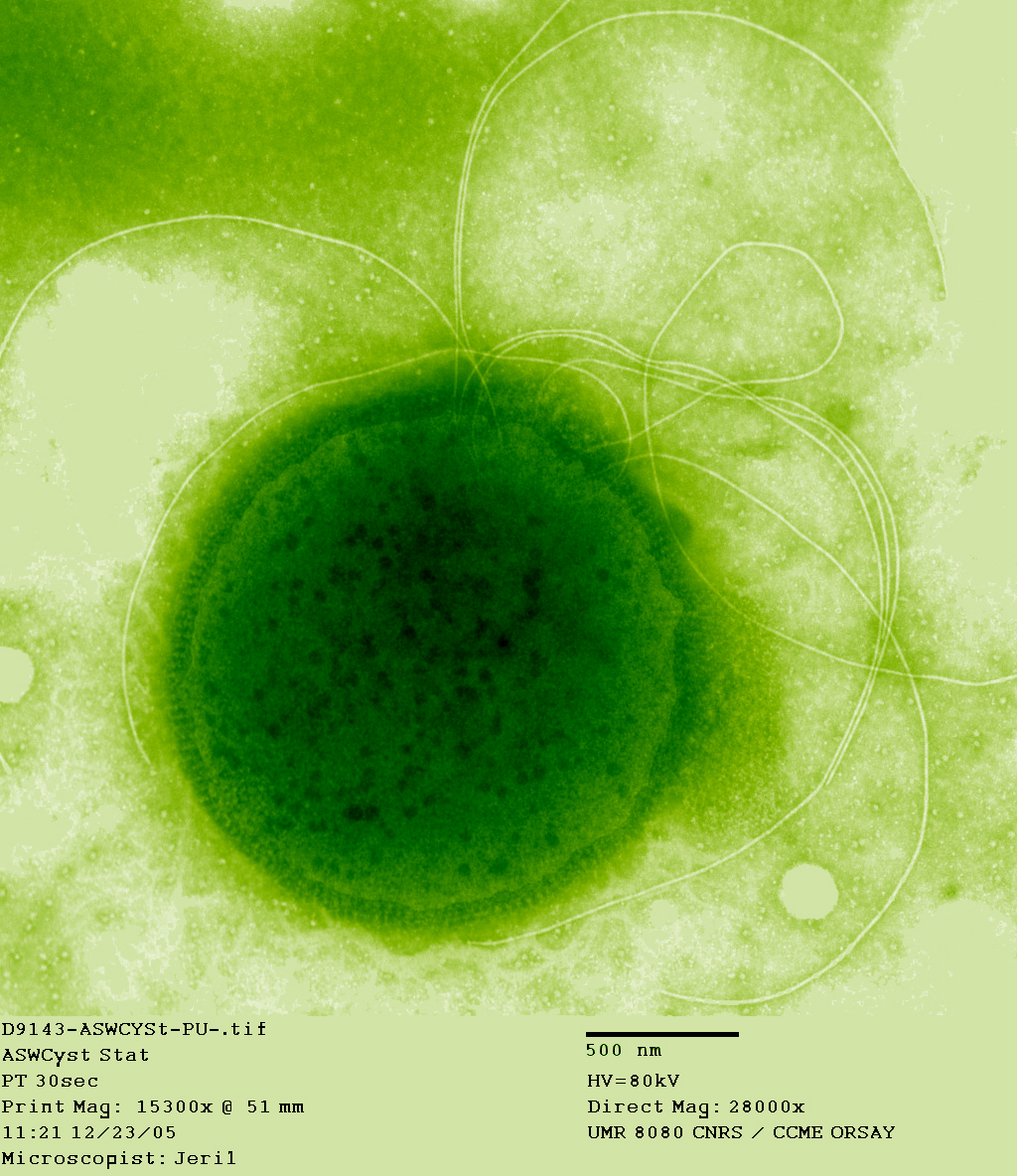
- Thermococcus gammatolerans

Scientific classification
- Domain: Archaea
- Kingdom: Methanobacteriati
- Phylum: Methanobacteriota
- Class: Thermococci
- Order: Thermococcales
- Family: Thermococcaceae
- Genus: Thermococcus
- Species: T. gammatolerans

Binomial name
- Thermococcus gammatolerans Jolivet, 2003

= Thermococcus gammatolerans =

Species of archaeon

Thermococcus gammatolerans is a gram-negative archaeon extremophile and the most radiation-resistant organism known to exist.

As reported in 2003 the type strain EJ3^{T} was taken from a submarine hydrothermal vent in the Guaymas Basin off the coast of Baja California at a depth of about 2,600 m (8,500 ft) by submersible Nautile during the 1991 Guaynaut cruise. Thermococcus gammatolerans thrives in temperatures between 55 and 95 °C (131 and 203 °F) with an optimum development around 88 °C (190 °F). Its optimal growth pH is 6, favoring the presence of sulfur (S), which is reduced to hydrogen sulfide (H_{2}S). It is the organism with the strongest known resistance to radiation, surviving a dose of 30,000 gray (Gy) of gamma rays.

Along with the genera Palaeococcus and Pyrococcus, Thermococcus belongs to the Thermococcaceae family, sole family of the Thermococci (called "Protoarchaea" by Cavalier-Smith), a class in the phylum Euryarchaeota of Archaea. Thermococcus species live in extremely hot environments such as hydrothermal vents with an optimum growth temperature above 80 °C (176 °F). Thermococcus and Pyrococcus (literally "ball of fire") are both chemoorganotrophic and obligately anaerobic. Thermococcus spp. prefer 70–95 °C (158–203 °F), whereas Pyrococcus species prefer 70–100 °C (158–212 °F).

The resistance to ionizing radiation of T. gammatolerans is enormous. While a dose of 5 Gy is sufficient to kill a human, and a dose of 60 Gy is able to kill all cells in a colony of E. coli, Thermococcus gammatolerans can withstand doses up to 30,000 Gy, and an instantaneous dose up to 5,000 Gy with no loss of viability.

== History ==
Thermococcus gammatolerans was discovered in 2003 in samples collected from a hydrothermal chimney at the Guaymas Basin about 2,000 m (6,600 ft) deep off the coast of California, (27° 1' N, 111° 24' W).

== Mechanisms of resistance to radiation ==
Unlike other organisms, cell survival in T. gammatolerans is not altered by changing conditions in its growth phase, but the lack of ideal conditions and nutrients decreases its radioresistance. The system of chromosomal DNA repair shows that cells in stationary phase of growth reconstitute DNA more rapidly than cells in exponential growth phase. T. gammatolerans can slowly or quickly rebuild damaged chromosomes without loss of viability.

== Applications ==
A study has been conducted of its application to the development of new enzymatic markers that are resistant to high temperatures and their application in the study of carcinogenesis and the study of the development of mitochondrial diseases. DNA repair mechanisms of T. gammatolerans could be incorporated into the genome of more complex species to improve DNA repair and reduce cellular aging.

== Etymology ==
Thermococcus: Greek feminine noun thermê (θέρμη), heat; Neo-Latin masculine noun coccus (from Greek masculine noun kokkos (κόκκος), berry), coccus; new Latin masculine noun Thermococcus, coccus existing in hot environment. gammatolerans: Gr. gamma (γάμμα), referring to gamma rays; Latin participle adjective tolerans, tolerating; Neo-Latin participle adjective gammatolerans, referring to its ability to tolerate high levels of γ-rays.
