= BpsA =

N4-bis(aminopropyl)spermidine synthase

Identifiers
- EC no.: 2.5.1.128

Databases
- BRENDA: enzyme data
- ExPASy: NiceZyme view
- KEGG: enzyme entry
- MetaCyc: metabolic pathway
- Rhea: reactions
- PDB structures: RCSB PDB PDBe PDBsum
Search
- PMC: articles
- PubMed: articles
- NCBI: proteins

BpsA (N(4)-bis(aminopropyl)spermidine synthase) is a single-module non-ribosomal peptide synthase (NRPS) (also see non-ribosomal peptide (NPR)) located in the cytoplasm responsible for the process of creating branched-chain polyamines, and producing spermidine and spermine. It has a singular ligand in its structure involved with Fe3+ and PLIP interactions. As seen by its EC number, it is a transferase (2) that transfers an alkyl or aryl group other than methyl groups (5) (2.5.1). BpsA was first discovered in the archaea Methanococcus jannaschii and thermophile Thermococcus kodakarensis and since then has been used in a variety of applications such as being used as a reporter, researching phosphopantetheinyl transferase (PPTase), and for NRPS domain recombination experiments it can be used as a model. Both (hyper)thermophilic bacteria and euryarchaeotal archaea seem to conserve BpsA and orthologs as branches chains polyamines are crucial for survival. There is also a second type of BpsA also known as Blue-pigment indigoidine synthetase that produces the pigment indigoidine and is found in organisms like Erwinia chrysanthemi. However, not much seems to be known about this variant except that it is a synthase, and it does not yet appear to be classified under an EC number.

== Thermophiles ==
In thermophiles, BpsA converts N4-aminopropylspermidine to N4-bis(aminopropyl)spermidine. In this pathway, aminopropyltransferase and ureohydrolase turn N1-aminopropylagmatine to agmantine and synthesize spermidine and spermine. Spermine and spermadine are utilized in a variety of pathways including macromolecule production, apoptosis and proliferation equilibrium, and the induction of differentiation in cells. Long Linear polyamines (such as ones found in TK-BpsA made of up spermine and spermidine) help stabilize DNA. Denaturation could possible occur at high temperatures, making the stabilization crucial for organisms that thrive here. If an organism cannot stabilize its DNA, it cannot survive. TK-BpsA is a BpsA found in the archaeon Thermococcus kodakarensis and is used to study this pathway more in depth. It is also a ternary complex. There are a few active sites that include polyamine spermidine/spermine synthases, and loop-closures occur upon the binding of spermidine, and a catalytic center made of a Gly-Asp-Asp-Asp motif which contains reactive secondary amino group of the substrate polyamine and a sulfur atom of the product 5ʹ-methylthioadenosine with Asp 159. The enzyme proves itself to be important to thermophiles as it supports growth under high-temperature conditions. In this system, the C-Terminal is a flexible region of branched-chain polyamine synthase facilitates substrate specificity and catalysis. This C-terminal region recognizes acceptor proteins for the enzyme and gain their flexibility from aspartate/glutamate residues. The flexibility itself is promoted by a ping-pong Bi-Bi mechanism that occurs when temperatures are high.
