= ADP-specific phosphofructokinase =

Class of enzymes

Identifiers
- EC no.: 2.7.1.146
- CAS no.: 237739-62-7

Databases
- IntEnz: IntEnz view
- BRENDA: BRENDA entry
- ExPASy: NiceZyme view
- KEGG: KEGG entry
- MetaCyc: metabolic pathway
- PRIAM: profile
- PDB structures: RCSB PDB PDBe PDBsum
- Gene Ontology: AmiGO / QuickGO
Search
- PMC: articles
- PubMed: articles
- NCBI: proteins

ADP-specific phosphofructokinase (EC 2.7.1.146) is an enzyme that catalyzes the chemical reaction

ADP +
fructose 6-phosphate
AMP +
fructose 1,6-bisphosphate

The enzyme characterised from Pyrococcus furiosus converts fructose 6-phosphate to fructose 1,6-bisphosphate by transferring a phosphate group from the cofactor, adenosine diphosphate (ADP), which is converted to adenosine monophosphate (AMP).

This enzyme is a transferase, specifically one transferring phosphorus-containing groups (phosphotransferases) with an alcohol group as acceptor. The systematic name of this enzyme class is ADP:D-fructose-6-phosphate 1-phosphotransferase. This enzyme is also called ADP-6-phosphofructokinase, ADP-dependent phosphofructokinase.

== Structural studies ==
As of late 2007, only one structure has been solved for this class of enzymes, with the PDB accession code PDB: 1U2X.
