= Thermostable DNA polymerase =

DNA polymerases that originate from thermophiles

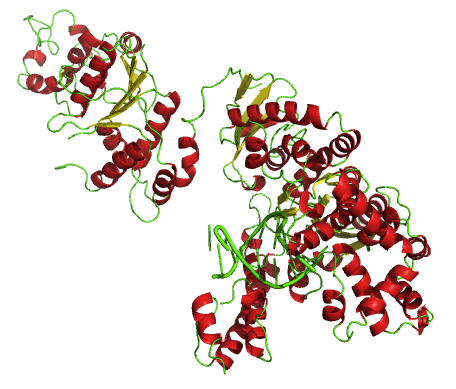
Taq-DNA-Polymerase with exonuclease- (top left) and polymerase domain with DNA (bottom right)

Thermostable DNA polymerases are DNA polymerases that originate from thermophiles, usually bacterial or archaeal species, and are therefore thermostable. They are used for the polymerase chain reaction and related methods for the amplification and modification of DNA. Thermostable DNA polymerases of natural origin are found in thermophilic bacteria, archaea and their pathogens.

== Properties ==
Several DNA polymerases have been described with distinct properties that define their specific utilisation in a PCR, in real-time PCR or in an isothermal amplification. Being DNA polymerases, the thermostable DNA polymerases all have a 5'→3' polymerase activity, and either a 5'→3' or a 3'→5' exonuclease activity.

Properties of thermostable DNA polymerases
| Polymerase | Taq | Tth (Tfl) (Note: Tfl refers to "Thermus flavus, which is not a validly published name. It is the same species as T. thermophilus by 16S comparison.) | Bst Klenow fragment (BF) | Tli (Vent) | Deep Vent | Pfx (KOD) | Pfu (Pwo) (Note: The P. woesei DNA polymerase has the same sequence as the P. furiosus polymerase. Moreover, the two "species" have the same 16S rRNA and a genomic average nucleotide identity exceeding 99%.) |
|---|---|---|---|---|---|---|---|
| Organism | Thermus aquaticus | Thermus thermophilus | Geobacillus stearothermophilus (Note: Formerly Bacillus, hence the "B" in Bst.) | Thermococcus litoralis | Pyrococcus sp. GB-D (Note: Strain GB-D has very limited sequence data. All its currently-available nucleotide sequences (U00707.1, AB022670.1) are identical to parts from the Pyrococcus kukulkanii LMOA42 genome.) | Thermococcus kodakarensis (Note: Formerly Pyrococcus kodakarensis, hence Pfx.) | Pyrococcus furiosus |
| Origin | bacterial | bacterial | bacterial | archaeal | archaeal | archaeal | archaeal |
| Molecular weight | 80kDa | 94kDa | 67kDa | 90kDa | 90kDa | 90kDa | 92kDa |
| Extension Temperature | 74 °C | 74 °C | 65 °C | 74 °C | 75 °C | 75 °C | 75 °C |
| 5′→3′ Exonuclease Activity | Yes | Yes | No | No | | | No |
| 3′→5′ Exonuclease Activity | No | No | No | Yes | Yes | Yes | Yes |
| Reverse Transcriptase Activity | Weak | Yes | Weak | No | | | N/A |
| PCR Ends | 3′-A | 3′-A | 3′-A | 70% Blunt; 30% Single-base | Blunt | Blunt | Blunt |
| Fidelity (errors per base and doubling) | 8 × 10^{−6} 1.5 × 10^{−4} 3-5.6 × 10^{−5} | | 1.5 × 10^{−5} | 2.8 × 10^{−6} | 2.7 × 10^{−6} 4.0 × 10^{−6} | 3.5 × 10^{−6} 1.2 × 10^{−5} 7.6 × 10^{−6} | 1.3 × 10^{−6} 5.1 × 10^{−6} 2.8 × 10^{−6} |
| Synthesis rate (bases/sec.) | 21–47; 61 | | 191 | | 23 | 120; 106–138 | 9.3–25 |
| Processivity (bases) | 10–42 | | | | <20 | >300 | 6.4–20 |

=== Speed & processivity ===
The baseline synthesis rates (speed, productivity) of various polymerases have been compared. The synthesis rate of Taq polymerase is around 60 base pairs per second. Among the unmodified thermostable DNA polymerases, only the synthesis rate of KOD polymerase is above 100 base pairs per second (approx. 120 bp/s). Among the modified thermostable DNA polymerases, various mutations have been described that increase the synthesis rate. KOD polymerase and some modified thermostable DNA polymerases (iProof/Phusion, Pfu Ultra, Velocity or Z-Taq) are used as a PCR variant with shorter amplification cycles (fast PCR, high-speed PCR) due to their high synthesis rate. Processivity describes the average number of base pairs before a polymerase falls off the DNA template. The processivity of the polymerase limits the maximum distance between the primer and the probe in some forms of real-time quantitative PCR (qPCR).

=== Fidelity ===
The error rates of various polymerases (fidelity) have been described. The error rate of Taq polymerase is 8 × 10^{−6} errors per base, that of Advantage HF 6.1 × 10^{−6} errors per base, that of Platinum Taq High Fidelity 5.8 × 10^{−6} errors per base and doubling, that of TaqPlus 4 × 10^{−6} errors per base and doubling, that of KOD polymerase 3.5 × 10^{−6} errors per base and doubling, that of Tli polymerase and Herculase 2.8 × 10^{−6} errors per base and doubling, that of Deep Vent 2.8 × 10^{−6} errors per base and doubling, that of Pfu, Phusion DNA Polymerase (identical with iProof DNA Polymerase) and Herculase II Fusion 1.3 × 10^{−6} errors per base and doubling and that of Pfu Ultra and Pfu Ultra II 4.3 × 10^{−7} errors per base and doubling. A newer analysis found slightly different error rates: Deep Vent (exo-) polymerase (5.0 × 10^{−4} errors per base and doubling), Taq polymerase (1.5 × 10^{−4} errors per base and doubling), Kapa HiFi HotStart ReadyMix (1.6 × 10^{−5} errors per base and doubling), KOD (1.2 × 10^{−5} errors per base and doubling), PrimeSTAR GXL (8.4 × 10^{−6} errors per base and doubling), Pfu (5.1 × 10^{−6} errors per base and doubling), Deep Vent DNA polymerase (4.0 × 10^{−6}) errors per base and doubling, Phusion (3.9 × 10^{−6} errors per base and doubling), and Q5 DNA polymerase (5.3 × 10^{−7} errors per base and doubling). Yet another found error rates of 3–5.6 × 10^{−6} for Taq, 7.6 × 10^{−6} for KOD, 2.8 × 10^{−6} for Pfu, 2.6 × 10^{−6} for Phusion, and 2.4 × 10^{−6} for Pwo. To reduce the number of mutations in the PCR product (e.g. for molecular cloning), more template DNA and less cycles can be used in the PCR.

=== Yield ===
Bacterial thermostable DNA polymerases generally produce higher product concentrations than archaeal, but with more copy errors. This is partly due to different degrees of exonuclease activity: higher activity leads to stronger proofreading but lower rate of synthesis, which leads to lower yields when used alone.

In the bacterial thermostable DNA polymerases, a Klenow fragment (Klen-Taq) or a Stoffel fragment can be generated by deleting the exonuclease domain in the course of protein design, analogous to the DNA polymerase from E. coli, which results in a higher product concentration. Two amino acids required for the exonuclease function of Taq polymerase were identified by mutagenesis as arginines at positions 25 and 74 (R25 and R74). A histidine to glutamic acid mutation at position 147 (short: H147E) in KOD polymerase lowers the relatively high exonuclease activity of KOD.

== Structure ==
DNA polymerases are roughly shaped like a hand with a thumb, palm and fingers. The thumb is involved in binding and moving double-stranded DNA. The palm carries the polymerase active site, whereas the fingers bind substrates (template DNA and nucleoside triphosphates). The exonuclease activity is in a separate protein domain. Mg^{2+} is a cofactor.

The polymerase active site in the palm catalyses the prolongation of DNA, starting from a primer bound to a template DNA single strand:

deoxynucleoside triphosphate + DNA_{n} ⇌ pyrophosphate + DNA_{n+1}.

== Bacterial polymerases ==
Several homologs of DNA polymerase I from thermostable bacteria are used for PCR. Sources for these enzymes include various Thermus species (T. aquaticus = Taq, T. thermophilus = Tth), Thermatoga (Tt. neapolitana = Tne, Tt. maritima = Tma), and Geobacillus stearothermophilus (Bst).

The DNA polymerase I homologs are A-type DNA polymerases. In addition to 5'→3' polymerase activity, the A-type polymerases have 5'→3' exonuclease activity and generate an adenosine overhang (sticky ends) at the 3' end of the newly generated strand. The Klenow fragment of Bst (BF) has a strand displacement activity which allows for use in isothermal amplification without the necessity of denaturation of the DNA in a thermocycler, and its 5'→3' exonuclease activity is deleted for higher yield.

== Archaeal polymerases ==
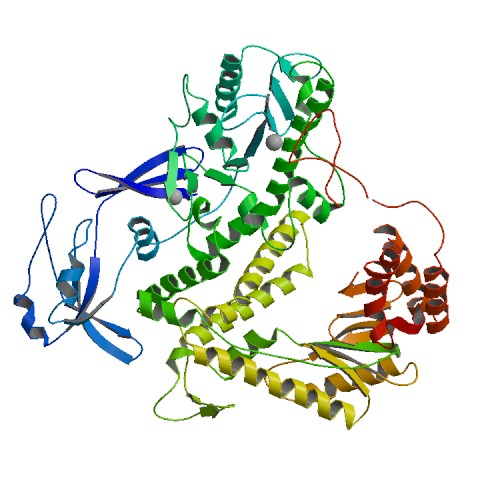
Pfu polymerase with two magnesium ions (grey spheres)

=== B-family ===
Archaea use a B-type DNA polymerase to copy their genome. The same enzyme is used for PCR. Sources for these enzymes include:

- Pyrococcus: P. furiosus = Pfu, P. woesei = Pwo, P. abyssi = Pab.
- Thermococcus: Vent/Tli from Tc. litoralis, KOD/Pfx from Tc. kodakarensis, Tc. aggregans = Tag, Tc. celer = Tce, Tc. gorgonarius = Tgo, TNA1 from Tc. onnurineus NA1, Tc. peptonophilus = Tpe, Tc. thioreducens = Tthi,
- Nanoarchaeum equitans = Neq. Unlike other archaeal B-family polymerases, Neq polymerase is not inhibited by uracil.

The B-type DNA polymerases produce blunt ends (the Tli polymerase produces an overhang in about 30% of the products). It displays 3'→5' exonuclease activity, unlike the bacterial 5'→3'. This activity plays a proofreading role. In archaeal polymerases, the error rate suffers when a Klenow fragment analogue is generated, as the correcting exonuclease activity is removed in the process.

Some B-family polymerases are known for their ability to handle DNA with modified bases. Specifically, this has been demonstrated for Phusion (commercial Pfu-Sso7d) and KOD.

=== Y-family ===
The Y-family DNA polymerases are used in DNA repair, specifically translesion synthesis (see DNA polymerase § Variation across species for an overview). They are found in all domains of life. Thermostable Y-family DNA polymerases such as Dpo4 from Sulfolobus solfataricus are able to bypass DNA lesions that would block regular A- and B-family DNA polymerases, making them suitable for amplifying ancient DNA.

== Modified polymerases ==
=== Mutagenesis ===
Specific amino acid residues can be changed on a DNA polymerase to provide many features such as: disabling (or weakening) of the exonuclease domain, more frequent activation of ddNTP (useful in Sanger sequencing), hot starting.

A modified Pfu polymerase was also generated by protein design (Pfu Ultra).

=== Chimera ===
The individual protein domains (exo, finger-palm, thumb) from different thermostable DNA polymerases can be mixed and matched to produce functional enzymes with new properties.

=== Processivity enhancement by domain fusion ===
The processivity of a DNA polymerase in PCR can be greatly enhanced by grafting it with a DNA-binding protein domain, creating a fusion protein. This is especially useful for DNA polymerases of Pyrococcus origin, which have high fidelity but low apparent speed due to low processivity.

- The thermostable DNA-binding protein SSo7d is fused with Pfu to produce an enzyme combining low error rate of archaeal and the high synthesis rate of bacterial thermostable DNA polymerases (Q5 polymerase). The product is also capable of long-range synthesis. Such fusion polymerases are sold under various tradenames (Phusion) under premium prices since 2014, but they can also be made and purified in a lab. (The commercial versions include additional mutations for performance.)
- A fusion protein of the PCNA homologue from Archaeoglobus fulgidus was also generated with archaeal thermostable DNA polymerases.
- Fusion proteins of thermostable DNA polymerases with the thermostable DNA-binding protein domain of a topoisomerase (type V, with helix-hairpin-helix motif, HhH) from Methanopyrus kandleri were generated (TopoTaq and PfuC2).

Fusion with a single-strand DNA binding domain has also been done.

=== Enzyme blends ===
Enhanced results are also achieved with mixtures of thermostable DNA polymerases of both types with a mixing ratio of the enzyme activities of type A and B polymerases of 30 to 1, e.g. Herculase and TaqPlus as a commercial mixture of Taq and Pfu polymerase, Expand as a commercial mixture of Taq and Pwo, Expand High Fidelity as a commercial mixture of Taq and Tgo, Platinum Taq High Fidelity as a commercial mixture of Taq and Tli (Vent), and Advantage HF 2 as a commercial mixture of Titanium Taq and an unnamed proof-reading polymerase. These mixtures can be used for long-range PCR to synthesize products of up to 35kb length.

Mixtures do not need to followed the A+B formula. A mixture of KOD and KOD(exo-) is also suitable for long-range PCR.

=== PCR enhancers ===
Additives are used to help against difficult GC-rich sequences, avoid or neutralise the negative effects of PCR inhibitors (like blood components or detergents or dUTP), or alter the reaction kinetics.

== Nucleotide specificity ==
The favouring of individual nucleotides by a thermostable DNA polymerase is referred to as nucleotide specificity (bias). In PCR-based DNA sequencing with chain termination substrates (dideoxy method), their uniform incorporation and thus unbiased generation of all chain termination products is often desired in order to enable higher sensitivity and easier analysis. For this purpose, a KlenTaq polymerase was generated by deletion and a phenylalanine at position 667 was exchanged for tyrosine by site-directed mutagenesis (short: F667Y) and named Thermo Sequenase. This polymerase can also be used for the incorporation of fluorescence-labelled dideoxynucleotides.

== Hot-start thermostable DNA polymerases ==
The template specificity of the polymerases is increased by using hot-start polymerases, to avoid binding of primers to unwanted DNA templates or to each other at low temperatures before the beginning of the PCR. Examples are the antibody-inhibited Pfu polymerase Pfu Turbo, the Platinum Pfx as a commercial KOD polymerase with an inhibiting antibody and the Platinum Taq as an antibody-inhibited Taq polymerase. Hot-start polymerases are either inhibited by inactivation with formaldehyde (or maleic anhydride, exo-cis-3,6-endoxo-Δ4-tetrahydropthalic anhydride, citraconic anhydride, 3,4,5,6-tetrahydrophthalic anhydride, cis-aconitic anhydride, or 2,3-dimethylmaleic anhydride), by complexing the magnesium with phosphates or by binding an antibody to their active site. Upon heating to 95 °C, the formaldehyde dissociates from proteins, or the magnesium ions are released, or the antibody is denatured and released in the process. Furthermore, polymerases can be inhibited with aptamers that denature upon heating. A fifth variant is a polymerase adsorbed on latex beads via hydrophobic effects, which dissolves with increasing temperature. In the sixth and oldest variant, the reaction mixture without polymerase is coated with wax and the polymerase is added on top of the cooled wax. When heated, the wax layer melts and the polymerase mixes with the reaction mixture.

== Other use cases ==
=== Isothermal amplification ===
Some DNA polymerases used in isothermal DNA amplification, e.g. in loop-mediated isothermal amplification, multidisplacement amplification, recombinase polymerase amplification or isothermal assembly, for the amplification of entire genomes (e.g. the φ29 DNA polymerase from the bacteriophage phi29, B35DNAP from the phage Bam35) are not thermostable, while others like the Bst Klenow fragment are thermostable. The T4, T6 and T7 DNA polymerases are also not thermostable.

=== RNA-dependent DNA polymerases ===
The standard reverse transcriptases (RNA-dependent DNA polymerases) of retroviral origin used for RT-PCR, like the AMV- and the MoMuLV-Reverse-Transcriptase, are not thermostable at 95 °C. At the lower temperatures of a reverse transcription unspecific hybridisation of primers to wrong sequences can occur, as well as unwanted secondary structures in the DNA template, which can lead to unwanted PCR products and less desired PCR products. The AMV reverse transcriptase may be used up to 70 °C. The MMLV enzyme has an error rate of 1.1×10^{−4}.

Some thermostable DNA-dependent DNA polymerases can be used as RNA-dependent DNA polymerases by exchanging Mg^{2+} as cofactors with Mn^{2+}, so that they may be used for an RT-PCR. But since the synthesis rate of Taq with Mn^{2+} is relatively low, Tth was increasingly used for this approach. The use of Mn^{2+} also increases the error rate and the necessary amount of template, so that this method is rarely used.

In 2012, researchers identified a bacteriophage homolog of Pol I (A-family DNA polymerase) in a metagenome collected from the Octopus hot spring (93 °C) in Yellowstone National Park. This thermaostable enzyme, "PyroPhage 3173 PolA", is capable of single-enzyme RT-PCR. It has a half-life of 11 minutes at 94 °C. The wildtype has strong 3'-5' endonuclease activity, fidelity of 1.25×10^{−5}, and produces blunt ends. The mutant with endonuclease disabled has a fidelity of 1.1×10^{−4} and produces a 1-nt overhang.

In 2016, scientists used directed evolution to modify the proofreading KOD DNA-directed DNA polymerase into what they call a reverse transcribing xenotranscriptase (RTX). This new enzyme is able to copy from and proofread with RNA and DNA templates. It has a fidelity of 3.7×10^{−5}. It was commercialized some time before April 2018.

== Applications ==
In addition to the choice of thermostable DNA polymerase, other parameters of a PCR are specifically changed in the course of PCR optimisation.

In addition to PCR, thermostable DNA polymerases are also used for RT-PCR variants, qPCR in different variants, site-specific mutagenesis and DNA sequencing. They are also used to produce hybridisation probes for Southern blot and Northern blot by random priming. The 5'→3' exonuclease activity is used for nick translation and TaqMan, among other things, without DNA replication (amplification).

== History ==
Alice Chien and colleagues were the first to characterise the thermostable Taq polymerase in 1976. The first use of a thermostable DNA polymerase was by Randall K. Saiki and colleagues in 1988, introducing Taq polymerase for PCR. The thermostability of Taq polymerase obliviated the need to add a non-thermostable DNA polymerase to the reaction after every melting phase of the PCR, because the Taq polymerase is not denatured by heating to 95 °C during the melting phase of each cyle. In 1989, the Taq polymerase gene was cloned and the Taq polymerase was produced in Escherichia coli as a recombinant protein. DNA of up to 35,000 basepairs was synthesized by Wayne M. Barnes by using different mixtures of A and B type polymerases, thereby creating the long-range PCR. The high synthesis rate of KOD polymerase was published in 1997 by Masahiro Takagi and colleagues, thereby creating the fundamentals of high speed PCR. Other optimisations to the PCR were developed in the following years, e.g. circumventing PCR inhibitors and amplifying difficult GC-rich DNA sequences, as well as modifying thermostable DNA polymerases by protein design. In 1998 the loop-mediated isothermal amplification was developed by Tsugunori Notomi and colleagues at Eiken Chemical Company, using Bst polymerase at 65 °C.
