= Mre11 =

The Mre11 family of enzymes includes:

- MRE11A in humans
- The Mre11 in Pyrococcus furiosus - see Pyrococcus furiosus § Mre11
