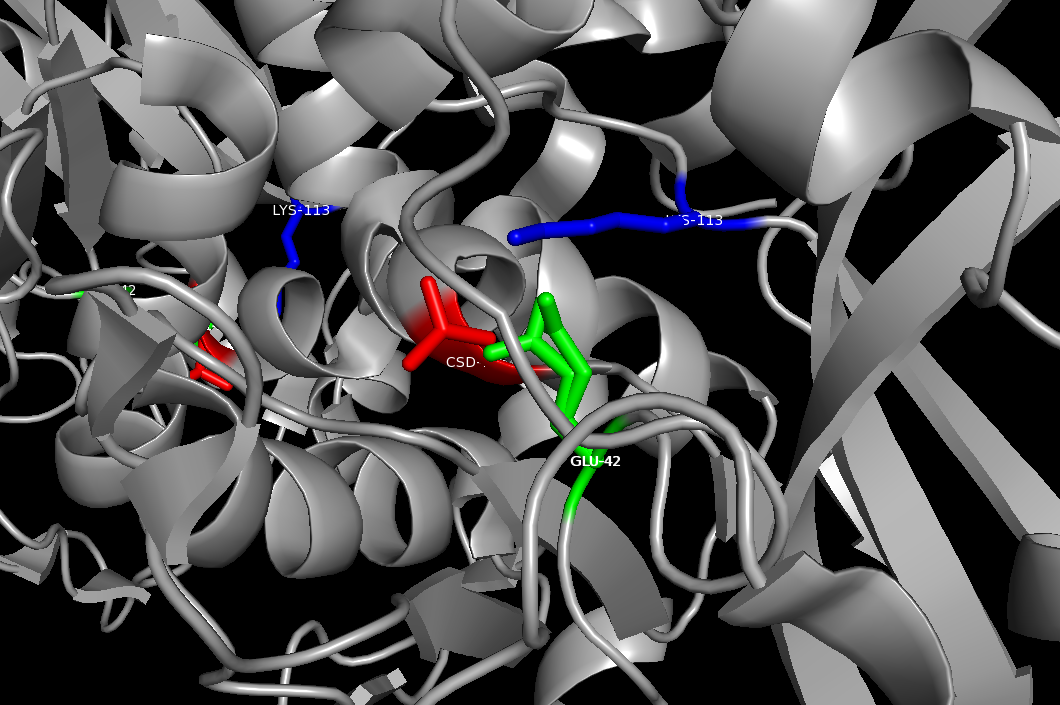
- Active site of a thermoactive nitrilase from Pyrococcus abyssi detailing the Cys-Glu-Lys catalytic triad.

Scientific classification
- Domain: Archaea
- Kingdom: Methanobacteriati
- Phylum: Methanobacteriota
- Class: Thermococci
- Order: Thermococcales
- Family: Thermococcaceae
- Genus: Pyrococcus
- Species: P. abyssi

Binomial name
- Pyrococcus abyssi Erauso et al. 1993

= Pyrococcus abyssi =

Species of archaeon

Pyrococcus abyssi is a hyperthermophilic archaeon isolated from a deep-sea hydrothermal vent in the North Fiji Basin at 2,000 metres (6,600 ft). It is anaerobic, sulfur-metabolizing, gram-negative, coccus-shaped and highly motile. Its optimum growth temperature is 96 °C (205 °F). Its type strain is GE5 (CNCM I-1302). Pyrococcus abyssi has been used as a model organism in studies of DNA polymerase. This species can also grow at high cell densities in bioreactors.
