= Unique properties of hyperthermophilic archaea =

This article discusses the Unique properties of hyperthermophilic archaea. Hyperthermophiles are organisms that can live at temperatures ranging between 70 and 125 °C. They have been the subject of intense study since their discovery in 1977 in the Galapagos Rift. It was thought impossible for life to exist at temperatures as great as 100 °C until Pyrolobus fumarii was discovered in 1997. P. fumarii is a unicellular organism from the domain Archaea living in the hydrothermal vents in black smokers along the Mid-Atlantic Ridge. These organisms can live at 106 °C at a pH of 5.5. To get energy from their environment these organisms are facultatively aerobic obligate chemolithoautotrophs, meaning these organisms build biomolecules by harvesting carbon dioxide (CO_{2}) from their environment by using hydrogen (H_{2}) as the primary electron donor and nitrate (NO_{3}^{−}) as the primary electron acceptor. These organisms can even survive the autoclave, which is a machine designed to kill organisms through high temperature and pressure. Because hyperthermophiles live in such hot environments, they must have DNA, membrane, and enzyme modifications that help them withstand intense thermal energy. Such modifications are currently being studied to better understand what allows an organism or protein to survive such harsh conditions. By learning what lets these organisms survive such harsh conditions, researchers can better synthesize molecules for industry that are harder to denature.

== DNA structures of P. fumarii ==
Two DNA strands are held together by base pairing that allows the nucleotide bases adenosine (A) to bind with thymine (T), and guanine (G) to bind with cytosine (C). It has been proposed that thermophilic archaea would be expected to have higher GC content within their DNA, because GC pairings have three hydrogen bonds, while AT pairings have only two. Increasing the number of hydrogen bonds would increase the stability of the DNA, thereby increasing the energy required to separate the two strands of DNA. This would help the DNA to remain double stranded while at such high temperatures that would normally provide enough thermal energy to separate the DNA strands.

P. fumarii was first sequenced in 2001 by the Diversa Corporation and the sequence was released to the public in 2014. The data from this analysis showed a GC content of 54.90%. This supports the hypothesis that thermophiles experience selective pressure to increase their GC content in order to stabilize their DNA. However, research has not conclusively supported this hypothesis. A study done by Hurst and Merchant (2001) showed no correlation between higher GC content in prokaryotes and increased optimal growing temperatures. However, their analysis did show that there was higher GC content for the third nucleic acid within the codon. This demonstrates that within the wobble position there is likely a selective pressure for more hydrogen bonds to increase stability within the DNA, but less selective pressure for GC pairings within the DNA as a whole. This supports what is seen in P. fumarii. The majority of the DNA is composed of G and C nucleotides, but the DNA still contains many A and T nucleotides. These results likely indicate that along with increasing GC pairing in the wobble position, thermophilic archaea have other mechanisms for stabilizing their DNA at such high temperatures.

One possible mechanism for stabilizing DNA at such high temperatures are proteins such as a type I topoisomerase that supertwists the DNA making spontaneously untwisting of the DNA more difficult. The presence of this protein in multiple evolutionarily distant organisms supports the hypothesis that this protein plays a role in DNA stabilization.

== DNA repair ==
The hyperthermophilic archaea have special strategies for coping with DNA damage including an essential requirement for key proteins that are employed in the process of homologous recombinational DNA repair. Also, DNA exchange occurs between archaeal hyperthermophiles, and this exchange likely plays a role in the repair of genomic DNA via homologous recombination, a process that could be crucial under conditions that damage DNA such as high temperature.

== Membrane adaptations ==
All microbes ranging from the smallest bacteria to the largest multicellular eukaryote contains a membrane with phospholipids. A phospholipid molecule is composed of a long fatty acid, often called the tail of the molecule, and a phosphate group, which serves as the head of the molecule. Phospholipid membranes can range widely in the structure of the fatty acid tail, which is composed of mostly hydrocarbons. These phospholipid molecules form bilayers with the polar phosphate groups facing the aqueous solution inside or outside of the cell with the hydrocarbons facing inward interacting with each other. The membrane, along with proteins, controls which molecules are allowed in or out of the cell. For this reason, the membrane plays a crucial role in the survival of the cell. A faulty membrane can allow too many solutes into the cell, resulting in cell death.

Different organisms have devised different strategies to control what goes in and out of the cell. Bacteria and eukaryotic cells contain phospholipid bilayers containing ester linkages, while archaea contain ether linkages. While these mechanisms work very well for organisms that live in mesophilic environments, they do not work for extremophiles. Mesophiles are organisms that live within relatively moderate temperatures (20–45 °C). They are organisms that live around sea level and can survive around the same temperatures as humans.

Extremophiles are organisms that grow best in extremely cold, acidic, basic or hot environments. P. fumarii is a hyperthermophile, indicating that this organism grows best at extremely high temperatures (70–125 °C). P. fumarii grows best at 106 °C. Due to the extremely high temperatures this archaea is subjected to, this organism must have extremely stable biomolecules to survive. Without increased stability in the membrane, the cell would fall apart, and too many molecules would flow in and out of the membrane, destroying the chemical gradients the cell uses as energy and letting all the proteins the cell has synthesized diffuse away, stopping its metabolic processes.

To deal with this problem archaea have changed their membrane lipid compositions. They still contain phosphate groups and long fatty acid tails, but they also contain ether linkages instead of ester linkages. The ether linkages make the bonds between phosphate groups and hydrocarbons more stable because the carbon connecting the phosphate group and glycerol molecule is more electron-rich than it would be in an ester, making that carbon less electrophilic and therefore less chemically reactive. This lets the ether-linked phospholipid be more stable and less susceptible to breakdown from large amounts of increased thermal energy. This contributes to the archaea's ability to live in such extreme environments.

Another membrane adaptation seen in some archaea is tetraether phospholipids. This specific adaptation has been found in P. fumarii along with other hyperthermophiles. A tetraether phospholipid is a molecule containing two hydrocarbon tails, each coming from one ester bond and one phosphate molecule. These phospholipids form monolayers instead of the typical bilayers seen in most bacteria and all eukaryotes. Therefore, instead two different molecules interacting with each other, only one molecule spans the entire width of the membrane. The monolayer then allows for tighter packing of molecules within the membrane because fewer molecules must fit into membrane, however these large molecules are less able to move within the membrane. This then decreases membrane fluidity, allowing the cell to keep more molecules from crossing the membrane. This is an extremely important adaptation because at such high temperatures, molecules move more quickly than at mesophilic temperatures. By decreasing the membrane fluidity, the cell can decrease movement of the phospholipid molecules, which stops unwanted movement of molecules across the membrane.

Another extremely important membrane regulation modification that archaea use to control influx and efflux of solutes is the addition of cyclopentane rings within the hydrocarbon tails of the ester-linked phospholipids. The addition of these rings into the membrane allows for even tighter packing of the membrane molecules. These cyclopentane rings can exist in tetraether lipids or diether lipids. By increasing the number of atoms in the middle of the membrane, there is less space for solutes to move in or out of the cell. This helps again to control the amount of solutes moving in and out of the cell. Cyclopentane rings help to crowd the membrane's inner structure making it more difficult for the solutes to get through the membrane to the other side of cell. This is so important for the cell because at hyperthermophilic conditions, the solutes travel very fast, carrying a lot of thermal energy from the environment. If the cell did not have these rings, too many unwanted molecules would likely pass through the membrane either into or out of the cell. This would result in the slowing or complete stop of metabolic processes resulting in cell death.

While these cyclopentane rings are extremely useful for keeping unwanted solutes from entering or leaving the cell, not all archaea use them. They are even seen in psychrophiles, which are archaea that require very cold conditions to survive (−15 °C or below). This is counterintuitive because cyclopentane molecules help to make the membrane more rigid, which is something that happens naturally. It is unclear why these rings are seen at both ends of the temperature spectrum, but it is clear that they serve functions other than simply slowing molecules from entering or leaving a cell.

== Metabolism ==
Because organisms like P. fumarii live in such harsh environments, these archaea have needed to devise unusual ways to gather energy from the environment and protect themselves against heat stress. P. fumarii, like plants, are able to harvest CO_{2} from the environment to build their biomolecules, but unlike plants, they take electrons from H_{2} instead of H_{2}O and transfer those electrons to NO_{3}^{−}, SO_{4}^{2−} or O_{2}. This type of metabolic process is classified as chemolithoautrophism, meaning their carbon comes from an inorganic source, their final electron acceptor is not O_{2} and they produce and consume their own food.

Another way that hyperthermophiles ensure their proteins' proper function is by using heat shock proteins (HSPs). While these HSPs are not unique to extremophiles, they are extremely important to study because HSPs found in hyperthermophiles are the most stable of their kind. HSPs are also able to prolong the life of a hyperthermophile even beyond its optimal growing temperature. By studying these proteins it may be possible to learn the mechanisms proteins use to stabilize other proteins, which may help in biosynthesis of new molecules. HSPs act as chaperone proteins that help enzymatic proteins maintain their proper conformation for longer than they would by themselves at such high temperatures. This is part of what allows P. fumarii to exist at temperatures that were long believed much too hot for life to exist.

The most common organisms that harvest CO_{2} to build biomolecules are plants and photosynthetic bacteria. Those particular organisms use the Calvin cycle for their carbon fixation. However, P. fumarii and other similar organisms contain particular enzymes that allow them to harvest CO_{2} at temperatures well above those tolerated by plants and photosynthetic bacteria with slightly different mechanisms. The alternate pathways used by these extremophiles are either the rTCA cycle, 3-HP cycle, 3-HP/4-HP cycle, or DC/4-HP cycle. These are likely some of the first pathways to evolve because the bacteria and archaea who use them live in environments that mirror the early Earth environments. Therefore, it is likely that these are some of the first carbon fixation pathways to evolve. The rTCA cycle is usually seen in organisms living at temperatures between 20 and 90 °C, while organisms living at temperatures above 90 °C most often use the DC/4-HP cycle. The 3-HP/4-HP cycle is most often used by thermoacidophiles in the Sulfolobales order.

The rTCA, 3-HP and 3-HP/4-HP cycles are all very important to particular extremophiles, but the DC/4-HP cycle is the one used by P. fumarii. For this reason, this article discusses the DC/4-HP cycle in further depth, and includes more information on two alternate carbon fixation cycles, with associated links.

The DC/4-HP cycle is a combination of the rTCA cycle and the 4-HP half of the 3-HP/4-HP cycle. Both the DC/4-HP and the 3-HP/4-HP cycles begin with acetoacetyl-CoA, which is a molecule containing two acetyl-CoA groups allowing this pathway to run twice with only one starting molecule. The acetyl-CoA is then converted to pyruvate, then PEP. The DC/4-HP cycle then follows the rTCA cycle, converting PEP to oxaloacetate, then to malate, then fumarate, and then to succinate. Once the succinate is formed, the pathway follows the same steps as those seen in the 3-HP/4-HP pathway. The final result is the regeneration of acetoacetyl-CoA allowing the process to start over. The only unique enzymes to this pathway are pyruvate synthase, pyruvate:water dikinase, and PEP carboxylase. Because so many of the steps in the DC/4-HP pathway are seen in other pathways, there were only a few unique enzymes to the DC/4-HP pathway, making it difficult to determine the existence of this pathway for a long time. This pathway was only discovered in P. fumarii a few years ago. The DC/4-HP cycle uses the same enzymes to convert oxaloacetate to succinyl-CoA and all the same enzymes as the 3-HP/4-HP pathway once the succinate is formed.

One molecule that has been identified as being related to hyperthermophilic organisms is di-myo-inositol phosphate (DIP). Inositol and other phosphate derivatives of this molecule are sugars often used as secondary messenger in eukaryotic cells. However, DIP has only ever been found in thermophilic cells and their use within the cells is largely unknown. A derivative of this sugar called UDP-α-GlcNAc3NAc-(4←1)-β-GlcpNAc3NAc has been found only in P. fumarii. The function of this sugar is unknown, but phosphorylated forms of this sugar have been found in conjunction with UDP-α-Glc- NAc3NAc, which is a sugar known to participate in the formation of the S-layer. These UDP sugars are only found when the cells are in supra optimal growing conditions. This suggests that these sugars are building blocks within the cell that allow for the creation of the S-layer protecting Gram-positive bacteria. This connection to the S-layer is extremely important, because it is hypothesized that the S-layer is used to help protect the cell from the heat stress associated with hyperthermophilic environments. The S-layer is also thought to help slow molecules from exiting or entering the cell. While these results are not conclusive, they do help to elucidate how the S-layer is created, which has remained a mystery for years.
