= Thermococcus =

Scientific classification
- Domain: Archaea
- Kingdom: Methanobacteriati
- Phylum: Methanobacteriota
- Class: Thermococci
- Order: Thermococcales
- Family: Thermococcaceae
- Genus: Thermococcus; Zillig 1983

Type species
- Thermococcus celer Zillig 1983

Species
- See text

Genus of archaea

Thermococcus is a genus of thermophilic Archaea in the family the Thermococcaceae.

Members of the genus Thermococcus are typically irregularly shaped coccoid species, ranging in size from 0.6 to 2.0 μm in diameter. Some species of Thermococcus are immobile, and some species have motility, using flagella as their main mode of movement. These flagella typically exist at a specific pole of the organism. This movement has been seen at room or at high temperatures, depending on the specific organism. In some species, these microorganisms can aggregate and form white-gray plaques. Species under Thermococcus typically thrive at temperatures between 60 and 105 °C, either in the presence of black smokers (hydrothermal vents), or freshwater springs. Species in this genus are strictly anaerobes, and are thermophilic, found in a variety depths, such as in hydrothermal vents 2500m below the ocean surface, but also centimeters below the water surface in geothermal springs. These organisms thrive at pH levels of 5.6-7.9. Members of this genus have been found in many hydrothermal vent systems in the world, including from the seas of Japan, to off the coasts of California. Sodium Chloride salt is typically present in these locations at 1%-3% concentration, but is not a required substrate for these organisms, as one study showed Thermococcus members living in fresh hot water systems in New Zealand, but they do require a low concentration of lithium ions for growth. Thermococcus members are described as heterotrophic, chemotrophic, and are organotrophic sulfanogens; using elemental sulfur and carbon sources including amino acids, carbohydrates, and organic acids such as pyruvate.

== Phylogeny ==
The currently accepted taxonomy is based on the List of Prokaryotic names with Standing in Nomenclature (LPSN) and National Center for Biotechnology Information (NCBI).

16S rRNA based LTP_07_2026

- - - Palaeococcus
    - - Thermococcus~1
        - T. aggregans
        - - - T. argininiproducens
            - T. sibiricus
          - - T. litoralis
            - - T. aegaeus Arab et al. 2000
              - T. alcaliphilus
  - - Pyrococcus
    - Thermococcus s.s.
      - - T. barophilus
        - T. paralvinellae
      - - - T. waiotapuensis Gonzlez et al. 2001
          - T. zilligii
        - - - T. acidaminovorans Dirmeier et al. 2001
            - - - T. fumicolans Godfroy et al. 1996
                - T. gorgonarius
              - - - T. stetteri
                  - - T. kodakarensis
                    - T. peptonophilus
                - - - T. gammatolerans
                    - T. guaymasensis
                  - - - T. eurythermalis
                      - T. marinus
                    - - T. henrietii
                      - T. nautili
          - - T. pacificus
            - - T. profundus
              - - - T. cleftensis
                  - - T. siculi
                    - - T. indicus
                      - - T. aciditolerans Li et al. 2021
                        - - T. camini
                          - T. celericrescens
                - - T. atlanticus Cambon-Bonavita et al. 2004
                  - - T. piezophilus
                    - - - T. radiotolerans
                        - - T. coalescens Kuwabara et al. 2005
                          - - T. prieurii Gorlas et al. 2013
                            - T. thioreducens
                      - - T. barossii
                        - - T. celer
                          - - T. hydrothermalis Godfroy et al. 1997
                            - T. thermotolerans

53 marker proteins based GTDB 11-RS232

- - Palaeococcus
  - - - Thermococcus_A
        - - T. argininiproducens Park et al. 2023
          - T. sibiricus Miroshnichenko et al. 2001
        - - "T. bergensis" Birkeland et al. 2021
          - - T. aggregans Canganella et al. 1998
            - - T. alcaliphilus Keller et al. 1997
              - T. litoralis Neuner et al. 2001
    - - - - Thermococcus_B
            - T. barophilus Marteinsson et al. 1999
            - T. paralvinellae Hensley et al. 2014
        - Pyrococcus
      - - Thermococcus s.s.
          - - - - T. gammatolerans Jolivet et al. 2003
                - T. guaymasensis Canganella et al. 1998
              - - T. profundus Kobayashi and Horikoshi 1995
                - - T. gorgonarius Miroshnichenko et al. 1998
                  - T. zilligii Ronimus et al. 1999
            - - - T. eurythermalis Zhao et al. 2015
                - - T. henrietii Alain et al. 2021
                  - T. nautili Soler et al. 2007
              - - T. kodakarensis Atomi et al. 2005
                - - T. peptonophilus González et al. 1996
                  - T. stetteri Miroshnichenko 1990
          - - - - "T. onnurineus" Bae et al. 2006
                - T. piezophilus Dalmasso et al. 2017
              - - T. celer Zillig 1983 (type sp.)
                - - - T. barossii Duffaud et al. 2005
                    - "T. radiotolerans" Jolivet et al. 2004
                  - - T. thermotolerans Yang et al. 2023
                    - T. thioreducens Pikuta et al. 2007
            - - T. cleftensis Hensley et al. 2014
              - - - T. pacificus Miroshnichenko et al. 1998
                  - T. siculi Grote et al. 2000
                - - T. camini Courtine et al. 2021
                  - - T. celericrescens Kuwabara et al. 2007
                    - T. indicus Lim et al. 2021

Unassigned species:

- T. marinus Jolivet et al. 2025
- "T. mexicalis" Antoine 1996
- "T. petroboostus" Kapse, Dagar & Dhakephalkar 2024
- "T. waimanguensis" Goetz & Morgan 1999

== Metabolism ==
Metabolically, Thermococcus spp. have developed a different form of glycolysis from eukaryotes and prokaryotes. One example of a metabolic pathway for these organisms is the metabolism of peptides, which occurs in three steps: first, hydrolysis of the peptides to amino acids is catalyzed by peptidases, then the conversion of the amino acids to keto acids is catalyzed by aminotransferases, and finally CO_{2} is released from the oxidative decarboxylation or the keto acids by four different enzymes, which produces coenzyme A derivatives that are used in other important metabolic pathways. Thermococcus species also have the enzyme rubisco (ribulose-1,5-bisphosphate carboxylase/oxygenase), which is made from enzymes involved in the metabolism of nucleic acids in Thermococcus kodakarensis, showing how integrated these metabolic systems truly are for these hyperthermophilic microorganisms. Some nutrients are limiting in Thermococcus cell growth. Nutrients that affect cell growth the most in thermococcal species are carbon and nitrogen sources. Since thermococcal species do not metabolically generate all necessary amino acids, some have to be provided by the environment in which these organisms thrive. Some of these needed amino acids are leucine, isoleucine, and valine (the branched-chain amino acids). When Thermococcus species are supplemented with these amino acids, they can metabolize them and produce acetyl-CoA or succinyl-CoA, which are important precursors used in other metabolic pathways essential for cellular growth and respiration. Thermococcus onnurineus lacks the genes for purine nucleotide biosynthesis and thus relies on environmental sources to meet its purine requirements. With today's technology, Thermococcus members are relatively easy to grow in labs, and are therefore considered model organisms for studying the physiological and molecular pathways of extremophiles. Thermococcus kodakarensis is one example of a model Thermococcus species, a microorganism in which has had its entire genome examined and replicated.

== Ecology ==
Thermococcal species can grow between 60 and 102 °C, optimal temperature at 85 °C which gives them a great ecological advantage to be the first organisms to colonize new hydrothermal environments. As hyperthermophiles, there is a need for extreme environmental conditions, including temperature, pH, and salt. These conditions lead to the production of stress proteins and molecular chaperones that protect DNA as well as housekeeping cellular machinery. Thermococcus also thrives under gluconeogenic conditions. Some thermococcal species produce CO_{2}, H_{2}, and H_{2}S as products of metabolism and respiration. The releases of these molecules are then used by other autotrophic species, aiding the diversity of hydrothermal microbial communities. This type of continuous enrichment culture plays a crucial role in the ecology of deep-sea hydrothermal vents, suggesting that thermococci interact with other organisms via metabolite exchange, which supports the growth of autotrophs. Thermococcus species that release H_{2} with the use of multiple hydrogenases (including CO-dependent hydrogenases) have been regarded as potential biocatalysts for water-gas shift reactions.

== Transportation mechanisms ==
Thermococcus species are naturally competent in taking up DNA and incorporating donor DNA into their genomes via homologous recombination. These species can produce membrane vesicles (MVs), formed by budding from the outermost cellular membranes, which can capture and obtain plasmids from neighboring Archaea species to transfer the DNA into either themselves or surrounding species. These MVs are secreted from the cells in clusters, forming nanospheres or nanotubes, keeping the internal membranes continuous. Competence for DNA transfer and integration of donor DNA into the recipient genome by homologous recombination is common in the archaea and appears to be an adaptation for repairing DNA damage in the recipient cells (see Archaea subsection "Gene transfer and genetic exchange").

Thermococcus species produce numerous MVs, transferring DNA, metabolites, and even toxins in some species; moreover, these MVs protect their contents against thermodegradation by transferring these macromolecules in a protected environment. MVs also prevent infections by capturing viral particles. Along with transporting macromolecules, Thermococcus species use MVs to communicate to each other. Furthermore, these MVs are used by a specific species (Thermococcus coalescens) to indicate when aggregation should occur, so these typically single-celled miroorganisms can fuse into one massive single cell.

It has been reported that Thermococcus kodakarensis has four virus-like integrated gene elements containing subtilisin-like serine protease precursors. To date, only two viruses have been isolated from Thermococcus spp., PAVE1 and TPV1. These viruses exist in their hosts in a carrier state.
The process of DNA replication and elongation has been extensively studied in T. kodakarensis. The DNA molecule is a circular structure consisting of about 2 million base pairs in length, and has more than 2,000 sequences that code for proteins.

== Future technology ==
An enzyme from Thermococcus, Tpa-S DNA polymerase, has been found to be more efficient in long and rapid polymerase chain reaction (PCR) than Taq polymerase. Tk-SP, another enzyme from T. kodakarensis, can degrade abnormal prion proteins (PrPSc); prions are misfolded proteins that can cause fatal diseases in all organisms. Tk-SP shows broad substrate specificity, and degraded prions exponentially in the lab setting. This enzyme does not require calcium or any other substrate to fold, so is showing great potential in studies this far. Additional studies have been coordinated on the phosphoserine phosphatase (PSP) enzyme of T. onnurineus, which provided an essential component in the regulation of PSP activity. This information is useful for drug companies, because abnormal PSP activity leads to a major decrease in serine levels of the nervous system, causing neurological diseases and complications.

Thermococcus spp. can increase gold mining efficiency up to 95% due to their specific abilities in bioleaching.

== See also ==
- List of Archaea genera
