= Thermostability =

Ability of a substance to resist changes in structure under high temperatures

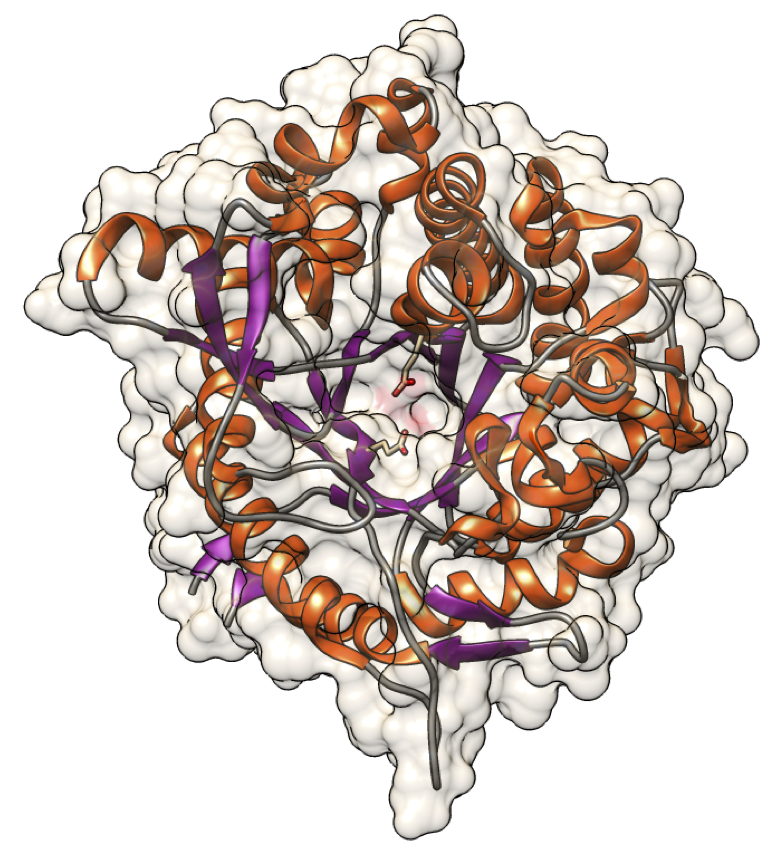
Crystal structure of β-glucosidase from Thermotoga neapolitana (PDB: 5IDI). Thermostable protein, active at 80°C and with unfolding temperature of 101°C.

In materials science and molecular biology, thermostability is the ability of a substance to resist irreversible change in its chemical or physical structure, often by resisting decomposition or polymerization, at a high relative temperature.

Thermostable materials may be used industrially as fire retardants. A thermostable plastic, an uncommon and unconventional term, is likely to refer to a thermosetting plastic that cannot be reshaped when heated, than to a thermoplastic that can be remelted and recast.

Thermostability is also a property of some proteins. To be a thermostable protein means to be resistant to changes in protein structure due to applied heat.

== Thermostable proteins ==
As heat is added, this disrupts the intramolecular bonds found in tertiary structure of proteins, causing the protein to unfold and become inactive.

Most life-forms on Earth live at temperatures of less than 50 °C, commonly from 15 to 50 °C. Within these organisms are macromolecules (proteins and nucleic acids) which form the three-dimensional structures essential to their enzymatic activity. Above the native temperature of the organism, thermal energy may cause the unfolding and denaturation, as the heat can disrupt the intramolecular bonds in the tertiary and quaternary structure. This unfolding will result in loss in enzymatic activity, which is understandably deleterious to continuing life-functions. An example of such is the denaturing of proteins in albumen from a clear, nearly colourless liquid to an opaque white, insoluble gel.

Proteins capable of withstanding such high temperatures compared to proteins that cannot, are generally from microorganisms that are hyperthermophiles. Such organisms can withstand above 50 °C temperatures as they usually live within environments of 85 °C and above. Certain thermophilic life-forms exist which can withstand temperatures above this, and have corresponding adaptations to preserve protein function at these temperatures. These can include altered bulk properties of the cell to stabilize all proteins, and specific changes to individual proteins. Comparing homologous proteins present in these thermophiles and other organisms reveal some differences in the protein structure. One notable difference is the presence of extra hydrogen bonds in the thermophile's proteins—meaning that the protein structure is more resistant to unfolding. Similarly, thermostable proteins are rich in salt bridges or/and extra disulfide bridges stabilizing the structure. Other factors of protein thermostability are compactness of protein structure, oligomerization, and strength interaction between subunits.

=== Uses and applications ===
==== Polymerase chain reactions ====
Thermostable DNA polymerases such as Taq polymerase and Pfu DNA polymerase are used in polymerase chain reactions (PCR) where temperatures of 94 °C or over are used to melt DNA strands in the denaturation step of PCR. This resistance to high temperature allows for DNA polymerase to elongate DNA with a desired sequence of interest with the presence of dNTPs.

==== Feed additives ====
Enzymes are often added to animal feed to improve the health and growth of farmed animals, particularly chickens and pigs. The feed is typically treated with high pressure steam to kill bacteria such as Salmonella. Therefore the added enzymes (e.g. phytase and xylanase) must be able to withstand this thermal challenge without being irreversibly inactivated.

==== Protein purification ====
Knowledge of an enzyme's resistance to high temperatures is especially beneficial in protein purification. In the procedure of heat denaturation, one can subject a mixture of proteins to high temperatures, which will result in the denaturation of proteins that are not thermostable, and the isolation of the protein that is thermodynamically stable. One notable example of this is found in the purification of alkaline phosphatase from the hyperthermophile Pyrococcus abyssi. This enzyme is known for being heat stable at temperatures greater than 95 °C, and therefore can be partially purified by heating when heterologously expressed in E. coli. The increase in temperature causes the E. coli proteins to precipitate, while the P. abyssi alkaline phosphatase remains stably in solution.

==== Glycoside hydrolases ====
Another important group of thermostable enzymes are glycoside hydrolases. These enzymes are responsible of the degradation of the major fraction of biomass, the polysaccharides present in starch and lignocellulose. Thus, glycoside hydrolases are gaining great interest in biorefining applications in the future bioeconomy. Some examples are the production of monosaccharides for food applications as well as use as carbon source for microbial conversion in fuels (ethanol) and chemical intermediates, production of oligosaccharides for prebiotic applications and production of surfactants alkyl glycoside type. All of these processes often involve thermal treatments to facilitate the polysaccharide hydrolysis, hence give thermostable variants of glycoside hydrolases an important role in this context.

=== Approaches to improve thermostability of proteins ===
Protein engineering can be used to enhance the thermostability of proteins. A number of site-directed and random mutagenesis techniques, in addition to directed evolution, have been used to increase the thermostability of target proteins. Comparative methods have been used to increase the stability of mesophilic proteins based on comparison to thermophilic homologs. Additionally, analysis of the protein unfolding by molecular dynamics can be used to understand the process of unfolding and then design stabilizing mutations. Rational protein engineering for increasing protein thermostability includes mutations which truncate loops, increase salt bridges or hydrogen bonds, introduced disulfide bonds. In addition, ligand binding can increase the stability of the protein, particularly when purified. There are various different forces that allow for the thermostability of a particular protein. These forces include hydrophobic interactions, electrostatic interactions, and the presence of disulfide bonds. The overall amount of hydrophobicity present in a particular protein is responsible for its thermostability. Another type of force that is responsible for thermostability of a protein is the electrostatic interactions between molecules. These interactions include salt bridges and hydrogen bonds. Salt bridges are unaffected by high temperatures, therefore, are necessary for protein and enzyme stability. A third force used to increase thermostability in proteins and enzymes is the presence of disulfide bonds. They present covalent cross-linkages between the polypeptide chains. These bonds are the strongest because they're covalent bonds, making them stronger than intermolecular forces. Glycosylation is another way to improve the thermostability of proteins. Stereoelectronic effects in stabilizing interactions between carbohydrate and protein can lead to the thermostabilization of the glycosylated protein. Cyclizing enzymes by covalently linking the N-terminus to the C-terminus has been applied to increase the thermostability of many enzymes. Intein cyclization and SpyTag/SpyCatcher cyclization have often been employed.

== Thermostable toxins ==
Certain poisonous fungi contain thermostable toxins, such as amatoxin found in the death cap and autumn skullcap mushrooms and patulin from molds. Therefore, applying heat to these will not remove the toxicity and is of particular concern for food safety.

== See also ==
Thermophiles

- Thermus thermophilus
- Thermus aquaticus
- Pyrococcus furiosus
