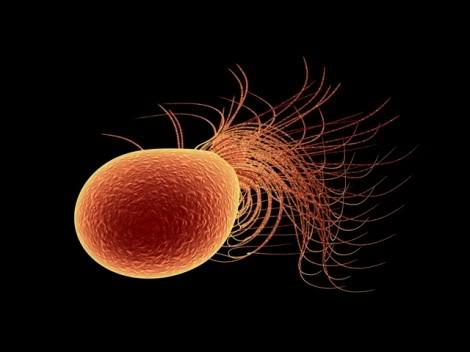
- Pyrococcus furiosus

Scientific classification
- Domain: Archaea
- Kingdom: Methanobacteriati
- Phylum: Methanobacteriota
- Class: Thermococci
- Order: Thermococcales
- Family: Thermococcaceae
- Genus: Pyrococcus
- Species: P. furiosus

Binomial name
- Pyrococcus furiosus Fiala and Stetter, 1986

Type strain
- ATCC 43587; DSM 3638; JCM 8422

= Pyrococcus furiosus =

Species of archaeon

Pyrococcus furiosus is a heterotrophic, strictly anaerobic, extremophilic, model species of archaea. It is classified as a hyperthermophile because it thrives best under extremely high temperatures, and is notable for having an optimum growth temperature of 100 °C (a temperature that would destroy most living organisms). P. furiosus belongs to the Pyrococcus genus, most commonly found in extreme environmental conditions of hydrothermal vents. It is one of the few prokaryotic organisms that has enzymes containing tungsten, an element rarely found in biological molecules.

Pyrococcus furiosus has many potential industrial applications, owing to its unique thermostable properties. P. furiosus is used in the process of DNA amplification by way of polymerase chain reaction (PCR) because of its proofreading activity. Utilizing P. furiosus in PCR DNA amplification instead of the traditionally used Taq DNA polymerase allows for a significantly more accurate process. The thermodynamic stability of P. furiosus' enzymes is useful in the creation of diols for laboratory and industrial purposes. Certain superoxide dismutases found in P. furiosus can be introduced into plants to increase their tolerance in environmentally stressful conditions and ultimately their survival.

== Properties ==
Pyrococcus furiosus is a strictly anaerobic, heterotrophic, sulfur-reducing archaea originally isolated from heated sediments in Vulcano, Italy by Fiala and Stetter. It is noted for its rapid doubling time of 37 minutes under optimal conditions, meaning that every 37 minutes the number of individual organisms is multiplied by two, yielding an exponential growth curve. Each organism is surrounded by a cellular envelope composed of glycoprotein called an S-layer. It appears as mostly regular cocci—meaning that it is roughly spherical—of 0.8 μm to 1.5 μm diameter with monopolar polytrichous flagellation.

A glycoprotein notable to archaea species makes up the majority of the composition of P. furiosus flagella. Aside from potentially using them for swimming, these flagella were observed under lab conditions in use for unique applications such as forming cell to cell connections during stationary growth phase. They are additionally utilized as cable-like connectors to adhere to various solid surfaces such as sand grains in the habitat in which this species was discovered. This may lead to the formation of microcolonial biofilm-like structures.

P. furiosus grows between 70 °C (158 °F) and 103 °C (217 °F), with an optimum temperature of 100 °C (212 °F), and between pH 5 and 9 (with an optimum at pH 7). Since it uses fermentation of carbohydrates, it grows well on yeast extract, maltose, cellobiose, β-glucans, starch, and protein sources (tryptone, peptone, casein, and meat extracts) through the Embden-Meyerhoff pathway. This is a relatively wide range of sources when compared to other archaea. Growth is very slow, or nonexistent, on amino acids, organic acids, alcohols, and most carbohydrates (including glucose, fructose, lactose, and galactose). The metabolic products of P. furiosus are CO_{2} and H_{2}. The presence of hydrogen severely inhibits its growth and metabolism; this effect can be circumvented, however, by introducing sulfur into the organism's environment. In this case, H_{2}S can be produced through its metabolic processes seemingly for the purpose of detoxication or energy conservation, not energy production. While many other hyperthermophiles depend on sulfur for growth, P. furiosus does not.

P. furiosus is also notable for its simple respiratory system, which obtains energy by reducing protons to hydrogen gas and uses this energy to create an electrochemical gradient across its cell membrane, thereby driving ATP synthesis. This could be a very early evolutionary precursor of respiratory systems in all higher organisms today.

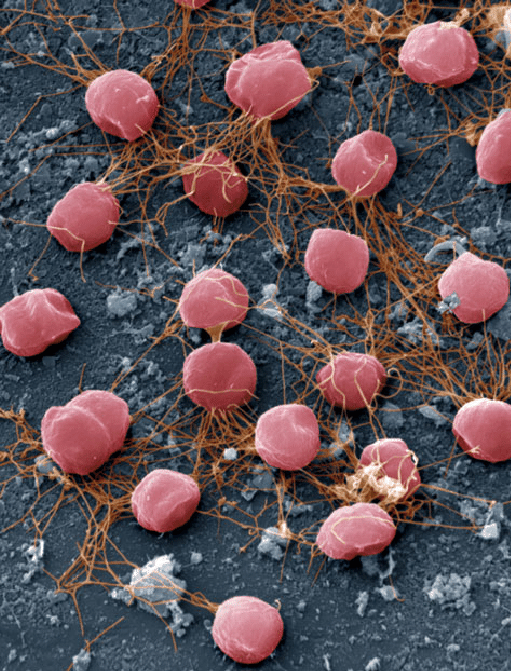
Interconnected flagella adhering to a solid surface.

== Genomics ==
The sequencing of the complete genome of Pyrococcus furiosus was completed in 2001 by scientists at the University of Maryland Biotechnology Institute. The Maryland team found that the genome has 1,908 kilobases, including 2,065 open reading frames (ORFs) that encode proteins. A study performed in 2005 revealed 17 new ORFs specific to Pyrococcus furiosus that were not originally annotated, bringing the number of ORFs up to 2,082.

A genetically tractable strain of Pyrococcus furiosus named COM1 was developed at the University of Georgia in 2011, making P. furiosus the most thermophilic organism that is able to be genetically engineered. COM1 is known for its "high plasticity" and increased ability to take up foreign DNA, owing to its high recombination and transposon activity. It has 1,571 more base pairs than the referenced NCBI genome, and 10 more insertion sequences (ISs). These ISs have deactivated 13 genes and many more are altered, but the strain's growth is yet comparable to its parent strain.

== Enzymes ==
=== Alcohol dehydrogenases ===
Pyrococcus furiosus possesses several highly thermostable alcohol dehydrogenases (ADHs): the short-chain AdhA, the iron-containing AdhB, the zinc-containing AdhC, and more. Each of these ADHs are NADP-dependent, and serve to replenish NADP^{+} by using the NADPH produced by fermentation to reduce aldehydes to alcohols. The aldehydes are also products of fermentation and are toxic to the cell, so removal is necessary. P. furiosus ADHs typically have a broad range of aldehyde substrates they can use, and they can also catalyze the reverse reaction (oxidation of alcohols) using ethanol, 1,3-propanediol, and other alcohols for substrate. As with most of the archaea's enzymes, the ADHs are sensitive to oxygen.

=== Oxidoreductases ===
Pyrococcus furiosus has five unique tungsten-containing oxidoreductases that are part of its NAD(P)H-independent glycolytic pathway. These enzymes function optimally above 90 °C. The first to be discovered was aldehyde ferredoxin oxidoreductase, or AOR, which utilizes tungsten, sulfur, and iron to catalyze the oxidation of aldehydes and reduce ferredoxin (this being the electron carrier instead of NAD(P)H). As this was the first, all tungsten-containing oxidoreductases are said to be part of the AOR family. The next oxidoreductase to be discovered was glyceraldehyde-3-phosphate ferredoxin oxidoreductase, or GAPOR, which utilizes tungsten and iron to catalyze the oxidation of specifically glyceraldehyde-3-phosphate. GAPOR only functions under anaerobic conditions, as with many enzymes in P. furiosus. Another oxidoreductase is formaldehyde ferredoxin oxidoreductase, or FOR, which catalyzes the oxidation of aldehydes into carboxylic acids. This enzyme utilizes four types of cofactors: tungsten, iron, sulfur, and calcium. The next oxidoreductase, WOR4, does not help oxidize aldehydes, but rather has a role in the reduction of elemental sulfur (S^{0}) into H_{2}S. This uses the same cofactors as FOR, and is only found in P. furiosus cells that are grown in the presence of elemental sulfur. The fifth and final oxidoreductase is named WOR5, and it has a broad specificity for aromatic and aliphatic aldehyde species.

An oxidoreductase species in P. furiosus that does not contain tungsten is pyruvate ferredoxin oxidoreductase, or POR, which catalyzes the final step of the glycolytic pathway. It is possible that POR is an ancestor of mesophilic pyruvate oxidoreductases. There is also the indolepyruvate ferredoxin oxidoreductase, or IOR, which utilizes iron and sulfur to catalyze the "oxidative decarboxylation of aryl pyruvates."

== Uses ==
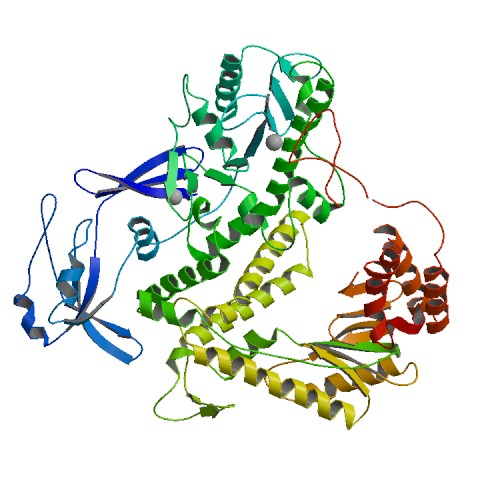
Pfu Polymerase ribbon diagram.

=== In DNA amplification ===
A DNA polymerase was discovered in P. furiosus that was thought to be unrelated to other known DNA polymerases, as no significant sequence homology was found between its two proteins and those of other known DNA polymerases. This DNA polymerase has strong 3'-to-5' exonucleolytic activity and a template-primer preference which is characteristic of a replicative DNA polymerase, leading scientists to believe that this enzyme may be the replicative DNA polymerase of P. furiosus. It has since been placed in the family B of polymerases, the same family as DNA polymerase II. Its structure, which appears quite typical for polymerase B, has been solved as well.

Since the enzymes of P. furiosus are extremely thermostable, the DNA polymerase from P. furiosus (also known as Pfu DNA polymerase) can be used in the polymerase chain reaction (PCR) DNA amplification process. The PCR process must use a thermostable DNA polymerase for automated in vitro amplification, which was originally used Taq DNA polymerase. However, since purified Taq DNA polymerase lacks exonuclease (proofreading) activity, it cannot excise mismatched nucleotides. Researchers discovered in the early 1990s that the Pfu DNA polymerase of P. furiosus does possess a requisite 3’-to-5’ exonuclease activity allowing for the removal of errors. Subsequent tests utilizing Pfu DNA polymerase in the PCR process revealed a more than tenfold improvement over the accuracy of using Taq DNA polymerase.

=== In production of alcohols ===
One practical application of P. furiosus is in the production of alcohols for various industrial processes. It may be possible to use the enzymes of P. furiosus for applications in such industries as food, pharmaceuticals, and fine-chemicals in which alcohol dehydrogenases are necessary in the production of enantio- and diastereomerically pure diols. Enzymes from hyperthermophiles such as P. furiosus can perform well in laboratory processes because they are relatively resistant: they generally function well at high temperatures and high pressures, as well as in high concentrations of chemicals.

In order to make naturally derived enzymes useful in the laboratory, it is often necessary to alter their genetic makeup. Otherwise, the naturally occurring enzymes may not be efficient in an artificially induced procedure. Although the enzymes of P. furiosus function optimally at a high temperature, scientists may not necessarily want to carry out a procedure at 100 °C (212 °F). Consequently, in this case, the specific enzyme AdhA was taken from P. furiosus and put through various mutations in a laboratory in order to obtain a suitable alcohol dehydrogenase for use in artificial processes. This allowed scientists to obtain a mutant enzyme that could function efficiently at lower temperatures and maintain productivity.

=== In plants ===
The expression of a certain gene found in P. furiosus in plants can also render them more durable by increasing their tolerance for heat. In response to environmental stresses such as heat exposure, plants produce reactive oxygen species which can result in cell death. If these free radicals are removed, cell death can be delayed. Enzymes in plants called superoxide dismutases remove superoxide anion radicals from cells, but increasing the amount and activity of these enzymes is difficult and not the most efficient way to go about improving the durability of plants.

By introducing the superoxide reductases of P. furiosus into plants, the levels of O_{2} can be rapidly reduced. Scientists tested this method using the Arabidopsis thaliana plant. As a result of this procedure, cell death in plants occurs less often, therefore resulting in a reduction in the severity of responses to environmental stress. This enhances the survival of plants, making them more resistant to light, chemical, and heat stress.

This study could potentially be used as a starting point to creating plants that could survive in more extreme climates on other planets such as Mars. By introducing more enzymes from extremophiles like P. furiosus into other species of plants, it may be possible to create incredibly resistant species.

=== In researching amino acids ===
By comparing P. furiosus with a related species of archaea, Pyrococcus abyssi, scientists have tried to determine the correlation between certain amino acids and affinity for certain pressures in different species. P. furiosus is not barophilic, while P. abyssi is, meaning that it functions optimally at very high pressures. Using two hyperthermophilic species of archaea lessens the possibility of deviations having to do with temperature of the environment, essentially reducing the variables in the experimental design.

Besides yielding information about the barophilicity of certain amino acids, the experiment also provided valuable insight into the origin of the genetic code and its organizational influences. It was found that most of the amino acids that determined barophilicity were also found to be important in the organization of the genetic code. It was also found that more polar amino acids and smaller amino acids were more likely to be barophilic. Through the comparison of these two archaea, the conclusion was reached that the genetic code was likely structured under high hydrostatic pressure, and that hydrostatic pressure was a more influential factor in determining genetic code than temperature.

== History ==
Pyrococcus furiosus was originally isolated anaerobically from geothermal marine sediments with temperatures between 90 °C (194 °F) and 100 °C (212 °F) collected at the beach of Porto Levante, Vulcano Island, Italy. It was first described by Karl Stetter of the University of Regensburg in Germany, and a colleague, Gerhard Fiala. Pyrococcus furiosus actually originated a new genus of archaea with its relatively recent discovery in 1986.

The name Pyrococcus means "fireball" in Greek, to refer to the extremophile's round shape and ability to grow in temperatures of around 100 degrees Celsius. The species name furiosus means 'rushing' in Latin, and refers to the extremophile's doubling time and rapid swimming.

== See also ==
- Thermostable DNA polymerase
- Thermococcus kodakarensis
