= Pfu DNA polymerase =

Enzyme

Identifiers
- Organism: Pyrococcus furiosus
- Symbol: pol
- PDB: 4ahc
- UniProt: P61875
Search for
- Structures: Swiss-model
- Domains: InterPro

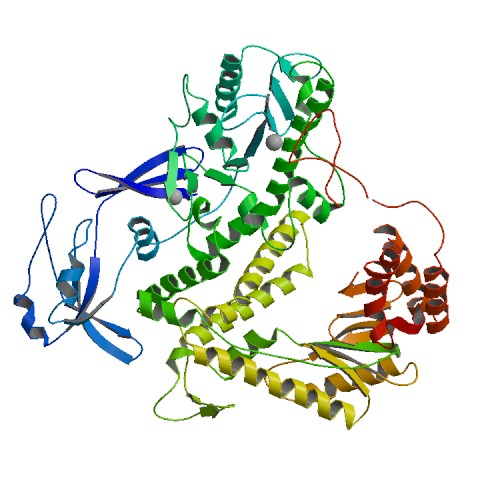
Pfu Polymerase ribbon diagram

Pfu DNA polymerase is an enzyme found in the hyperthermophilic archaeon Pyrococcus furiosus, where it functions to copy the organism's DNA during cell division (thermostable DNA polymerase). In the laboratory setting, Pfu is used to amplify DNA in the polymerase chain reaction (PCR), where the enzyme serves the central function of copying a new strand of DNA during each extension step.

It is a family B DNA polymerase. It has an RNase H-like 3'-5' exonuclease domain, typical of B-family polymerase such as DNA polymerase II.

The Pwo DNA polymerase (P61876) is 100% identical to Pfu DNA polymerase.

== Features ==
Pfu DNA polymerase has superior thermostability and proofreading properties compared with Taq DNA polymerase.

=== Proofreading ability ===
Unlike Taq DNA polymerase, Pfu DNA polymerase possesses 3' to 5' exonuclease proofreading activity, meaning that as the DNA is assembled from the 5' end to 3' end, the exonuclease activity immediately removes nucleotides misincorporated at the 3' end of the growing DNA strand. Consequently, Pfu DNA polymerase-generated PCR fragments will have fewer errors than Taq-generated PCR inserts.

Commercially available Pfu typically results in an error rate of 1 in 1.3 million base pairs and can yield 2.6% mutated products when amplifying 1 kb fragments using PCR. However, Pfu is slower and typically requires 1–2 minutes per cycle to amplify 1kb of DNA at 72 °C. Using Pfu DNA polymerase in PCR reactions also results in blunt-ended PCR products.

Pfu DNA polymerase is hence superior to Taq DNA polymerase for techniques that require high-fidelity DNA synthesis, but can also be used in conjunction with Taq polymerase to obtain the fidelity of Pfu with the speed of Taq polymerase activity.

=== Uracil sensitivity ===
This DNA polymerase, similar to other DNA polymerases from archaea is sensitive to Uracil residues in DNA and is strongly inhibited by dUTP or uracil residues in DNA. The inhibition of this class of thermostable DNA polymerases limit their use in some applications of PCR, i.e. use of dUTP for prevention of carryover contamination as well as application involving dU containing primers such as ligase free cloning methods or site directed mutagenesis using UNG.

== History ==
Scientists led by Eric Mathur at the biotech company Stratagene, based in La Jolla, California, discovered Pfu DNA polymerase which exhibits significantly higher fidelity of replication than Taq DNA polymerase in 1991. They received patents for exonuclease-deficient Pfu and the full Pfu in 1996.

Other polymerases from Pyrococcus strains such as "Deep Vent" (Q51334) from strain GB-D (coding sequence 100% identical to P. kukulkanii LMOA42) have also seen use.
