= Hyperthermophile =

Organism that thrives in extremely hot environments from 60°C upward

A hyperthermophile is an organism that thrives in extremely hot environments—from 60 °C (140 °F) upward. An optimal temperature for the existence of hyperthermophiles is often above 80 °C (176 °F). Hyperthermophiles are often within the domain Archaea, although a few bacterial examples exist. Some of them are able to live at temperatures greater than 100 °C (212 °F), deep in the ocean where high pressures increase the boiling point of water. Many hyperthermophiles are also able to withstand other environmental extremes, such as high acidity or high radiation levels. Hyperthermophiles are a subset of extremophiles. Their existence may support the possibility of extraterrestrial life, showing that life can thrive in environmental extremes.

== History ==
Hyperthermophiles isolated from hot springs in Yellowstone National Park were first reported by Thomas D. Brock in 1965. Since then, more than 70 species have been established. The most extreme hyperthermophiles live on the superheated walls of deep-sea hydrothermal vents, requiring temperatures of at least 90 °C (194 °F) for survival. An extraordinary heat-tolerant hyperthermophile is Geogemma barossii (Strain 121), which has been able to double its population during 24 hours in an autoclave at 121 °C (250 °F) (hence its name). The current record growth temperature is 122 °C (252 °F), for Methanopyrus kandleri.

Although no hyperthermophile has shown to thrive at temperatures >122 °C, temporary survival is possible. Strain 121 survives 130 °C (266 °F) for two hours, but was not able to reproduce until it had been transferred into a fresh growth medium at a relatively cooler 103 °C (217 °F).

== Research ==
Early research into hyperthermophiles speculated that their genome could be characterized by high guanine-cytosine content; however, recent studies show that "there is no obvious correlation between the GC content of the genome and the optimal environmental growth temperature of the organism."

The protein molecules in the hyperthermophiles exhibit hyperthermostability—that is, they can maintain structural stability (and therefore function) at high temperatures. Such proteins are homologous to their functional analogs in organisms that thrive at lower temperatures but have evolved to exhibit optimal function at much greater temperatures. Most of the low-temperature homologs of the hyperthermostable proteins would be denatured above 60 °C. Such hyperthermostable proteins are often commercially important, as chemical reactions proceed faster at high temperatures.

== Physiology ==
=== General physiology ===
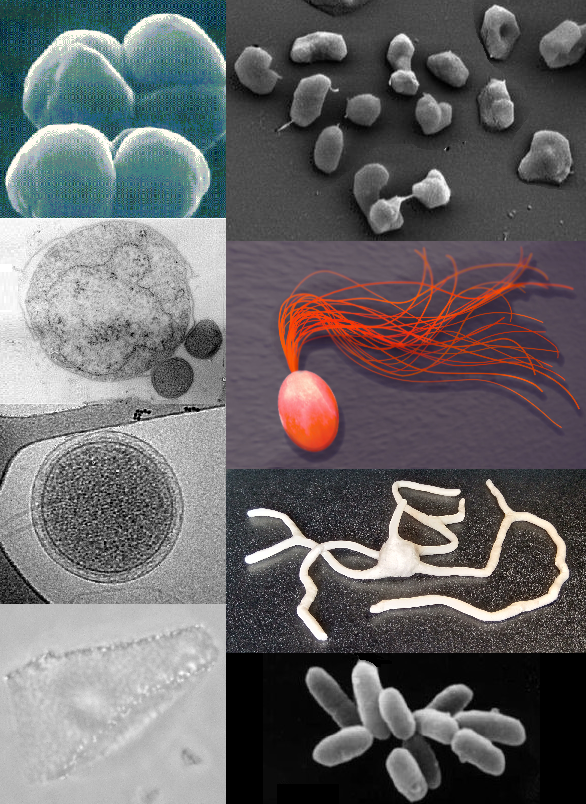
Different morphologies and classes of hyperthermophilic microorganisms

Due to their extreme environments, hyperthermophiles can be adapted to several variety of factors such as pH, redox potential, level of salinity, and temperature. They grow (similar to mesophiles) within a temperature range of about 25–30 °C (45–54 °F) between the minimal and maximal temperature. The fastest growth is obtained at their optimal growth temperature which may be up to 106 °C (223 °F). The main characteristics they present in their morphology are:

- Cell wall: the outermost part of archaea, it is arranged around the cell and protects the cell contents. It does not contain peptidoglycan, which makes them naturally resistant to lysozyme. The most common wall is a paracrystalline surface layer formed by proteins or glycoproteins of hexagonal symmetry. An exception is the genus Thermoplasma which lacks a wall, a deficiency that is filled by the development of a cell membrane with a unique chemical structure, containing a lipid tetraether unit and glucose in a very high proportion to the total lipids. In addition, it is accompanied by glycoproteins that together with lipids give the membrane of Thermoplasma species stability against the acidic and thermophilic conditions in which it lives.
- Cytoplasmic membrane: is the main adaptation to temperature. This membrane is radically different from that known from eukaryotes. The membrane of Archaea is built on a tetraether unit, thus establishing ether bonds between glycerol molecules and hydrophobic side chains that do not consist of fatty acids. These side chains are mainly composed of repeating isoprene units. At certain points of the membrane, side chains linked by covalent bonds and a monolayer are found at these points. Thus, the membrane is much more stable and resistant to temperature alterations than the acidic bilayers present in eukaryotic organisms and bacteria.
- Proteins: denature at elevated temperatures and so also must adapt. Protein complexes known as heat shock proteins assist with proper folding. Their function is to bind or engulf the protein during synthesis, creating an environment conducive to its correct tertiary conformation. In addition, heat shock proteins can collaborate in transporting newly folded proteins to their site of action. Furthermore, the absence of certain chaperone families in hyperthermophiles could explain the later acquisition of the DnaK-GrpE-DnaJ system by mesophilic archaea living alongside the bacteria that developed it.
- DNA: is also adapted to elevated temperatures by several mechanisms. The first is cyclic potassium 2,3-diphosphoglycerate, which has been isolated in only a few species of the genus. Methanopyrus is characterized by the fact that it prevents DNA damage at these temperatures. Topoisomerase is an enzyme found in all hyperthermophiles. It is responsible for the introduction of positive spins which confer greater stability against high temperatures. Sac7d this protein has been found in the genus and characterized by an increase, up to 40 °C (104 °F), in the melting temperature of DNA. The histones with which these proteins are associated collaborate in its supercoiling.

== Metabolism ==
Hyperthermophiles have a great diversity in metabolism including chemolithoautotrophy and chemoorganoheterotrophy, while there are no phototrophic hyperthermophiles known. Sugar catabolism involves non-phosphorylated versions of the Entner-Doudoroff pathway some modified versions of the Embden-Meyerhof pathway, the canonical Embden-Meyerhof pathway being present only in hyperthermophilic bacteria but not archaea.

Most of what is known about sugar catabolism in hyperthermophiles comes from observation on Pyrococcus furiosus. It grows on many different sugars such as starch, maltose, and cellobiose, that once in the cell are transformed to glucose, but other organic substrates can be used as carbon and energy sources.

Some differences discovered concerned the sugar kinases of starting reactions of this pathway: instead of conventional glucokinase and phosphofructokinase, two novel sugar kinases have been discovered. These enzymes are ADP-dependent glucokinase (ADP-GK) and ADP-dependent phosphofructokinase (ADP-PFK), they catalyse the same reactions but use ADP as phosphoryl donor, instead of ATP, producing AMP.

=== Adaptations ===
As a rule, hyperthermophiles do not propagate at 50 °C (122 °F) or below, some not even below 80 or 90 °C (176 or 194 °F). Although unable to grow at ambient temperatures, they are able to survive there for many years. Based on their simple growth requirements, hyperthermophiles could grow in any hot water-containing site, potentially even on other planets and moons like Mars and Europa. Thermophiles and hyperthermophiles employ different mechanisms to adapt their cells to heat, especially to the cell wall, plasma membrane, and its biomolecules (DNA, proteins, etc.):

- The presence in their plasma membrane of long-chain and saturated fatty acids in bacteria and "ether" bonds (diether or tetraether) in archaea. In some archaea the membrane has a monolayer structure which further increases its heat resistance.
- Overexpression of GroES and GroEL chaperones that help the correct folding of proteins in situations of cellular stress such as the temperature in which they grow.
- Accumulation of compounds such as potassium diphosphoglycerate that prevent chemical damage (depurination or depyrimidination) to DNA.
- Production of spermidine that stabilizes DNA, RNA and ribosomes.
- Presence of a DNA reverse DNA gyrase that produces positive supercoiling and stabilizes DNA against heat.
- Presence of proteins with higher content in α-helix regions, more resistant to heat.

=== DNA repair ===
The hyperthermophilic archaea appear to have special strategies for coping with DNA damage that distinguish these organisms from other organisms. These strategies include an essential requirement for key proteins employed in homologous recombination (a DNA repair process), an apparent lack of the DNA repair process of nucleotide excision repair, and a lack of the MutS/MutL homologs (DNA mismatch repair proteins).

== Specific hyperthermophiles ==
=== Archaea ===
- Strain 121, an archaeon living at 121 °C (250 °F) in the Pacific Ocean.
- Pyrolobus fumarii, an archaeon living at 113 °C (235 °F) in Atlantic hydrothermal vents.
- Pyrococcus furiosus, an archaeon which thrives at 100 °C, first discovered in Italy near a volcanic vent.
- Archaeoglobus fulgidus
- Methanococcus jannaschii
- Aeropyrum pernix
- Sulfolobus
- Methanopyrus kandleri strain 116, an archaeon living in a 80–122 °C (176–252 °F) Central Indian Ridge.

=== Gram-negative Bacteria ===
- Aquifex aeolicus
- Geothermobacterium ferrireducens, which thrives in 65–100 °C (149–212 °F) in Obsidian Pool, Yellowstone National Park.
- Thermotoga, especially Thermotoga maritima

== See also ==
- Mesophile
- Psychrophile
- Thermophile
- Unique properties of hyperthermophilic archaea
