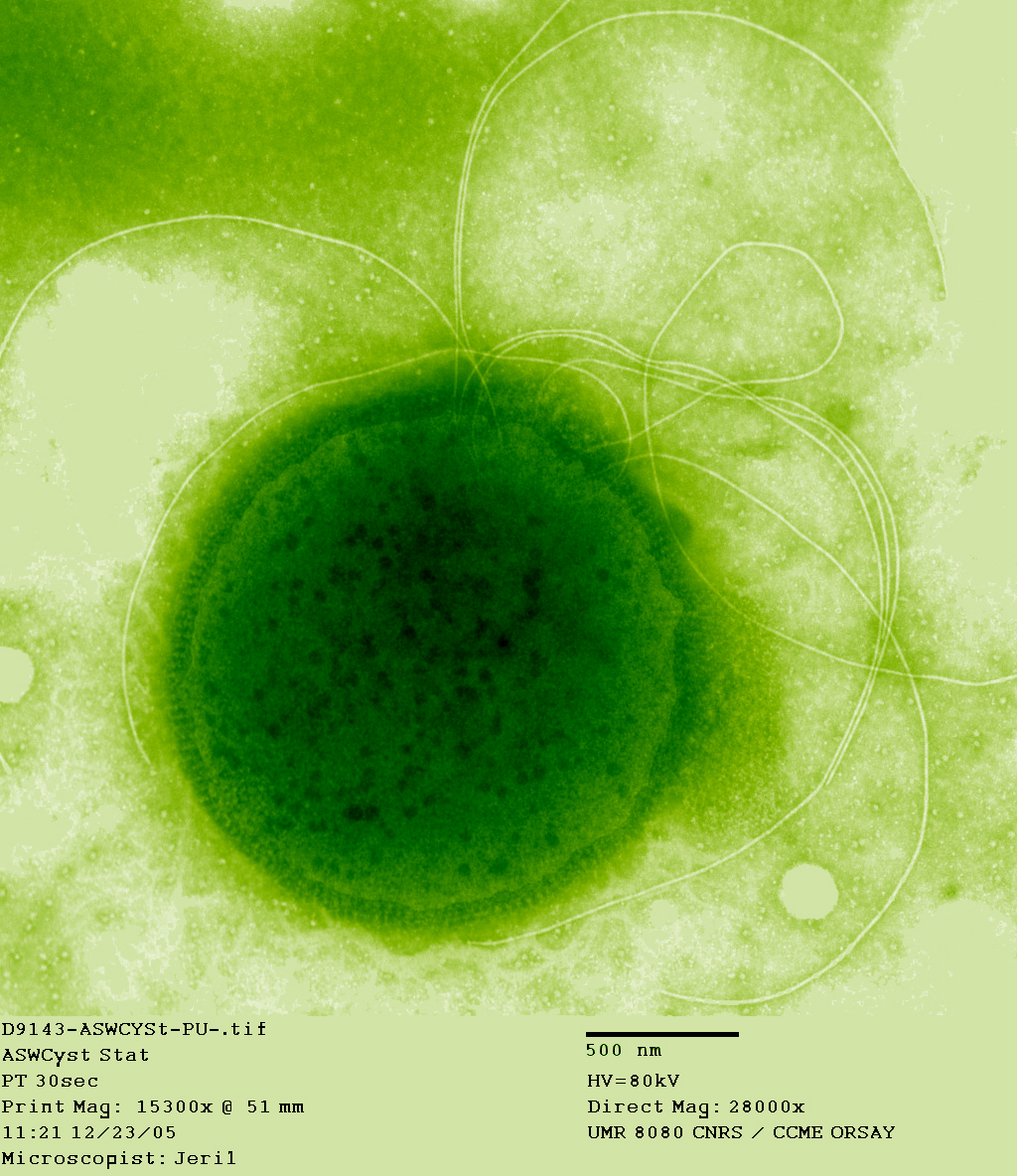
- Thermococcus gammatolerans

Scientific classification
- Domain: Archaea
- Kingdom: Methanobacteriati
- Phylum: Methanobacteriota
- Class: Thermococci; Zillig and Reysenbach 2002

Orders
- "Methanofastidiosales"; Thermococcales

Synonyms
- "Methanofastidiosia" corrig. Nobu et al. 2016; Protoarchaea Cavalier-Smith 2002; "Thermococcia" Oren, Parte & Garrity 2016

= Thermococci =

Class of archaea

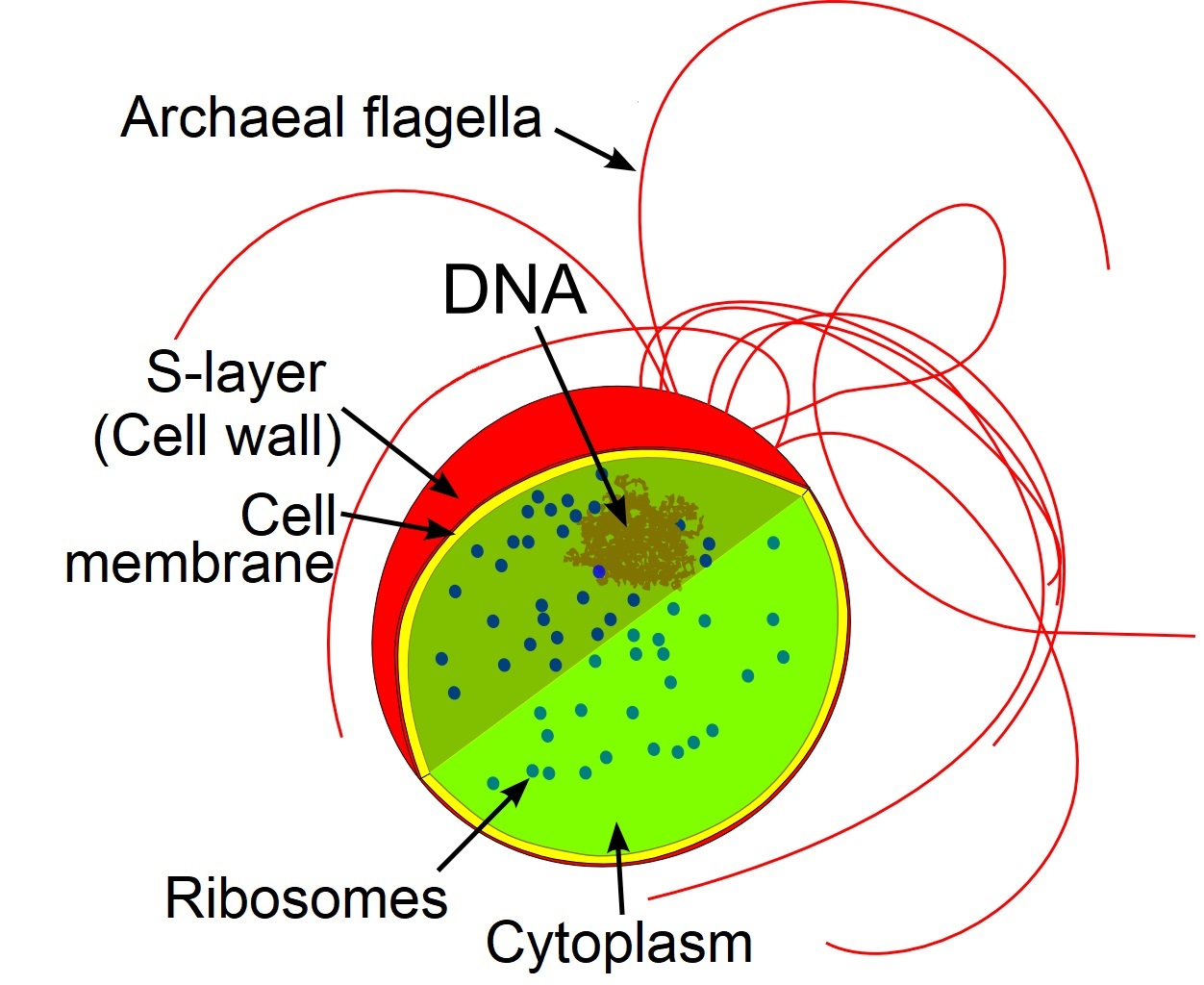
Schematic diagram of the Thermococcus gammatolerans cell pictured above.

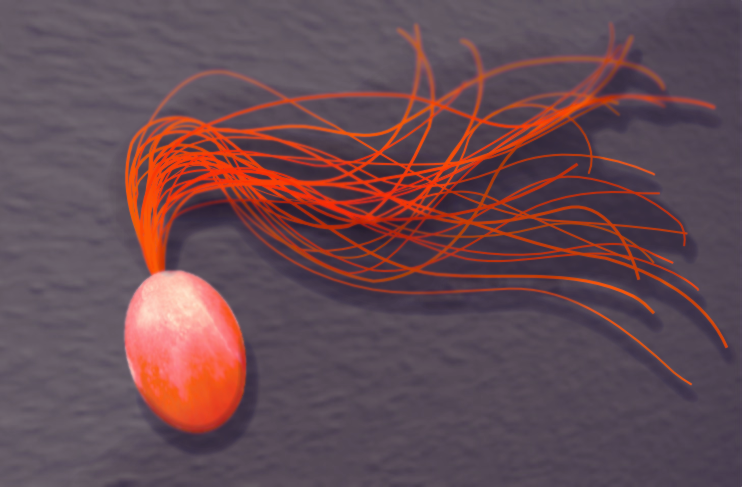
Pyrococcus furiosus

Thermococci is a class of microbes within the Euryarchaeota.

They live in extremely hot environments, such as hydrothermal vents, and their optimal growth temperatures tend to be around 75 to 85 °C. Thermococcus and Pyrococcus (literally "balls of fire") are both obligately anaerobic chemoorganotrophs.

Thermococcus prefers 70–95 °C and Pyrococcus 70-100 °C. Palaeococcus helgesonii, recently discovered in the Tyrrhenian Sea, is an aerobic chemoheterotrophic that grows at temperatures of 45–85 °C with an optimal temperature of 80 °C. Further, most Thermococci bacteria obtain their nutrition from the oxidation of organic compounds, and have a variety of nutritional categories. Some of these categories include those from mesophillic bacteria. Thermococcus gammatolerans sp. nov. was recently discovered in the Guaymas Basin, and it grows at temperatures from 55 to 95 °C with an optimal temperature around 88 °C with an optimal pH of 6. It has pronounced radioresistance and can survive gamma radiation at 30 kGy.

Thermococcus grows on organic substrates where there is a higher capacity of elemental sulfur. This archaeon mostly grows between temperatures 60–100 degrees Celsius. The average temperature where they thrive is around 85 degrees Celsius.

The DNA structure has a circular genome with around 2,353 coding sequence, and 2,306 are identified.

== Taxonomy ==
This class encompasses the hyperthermophilic members of Methanobacteriota that have a sulfur-based anaerobic respiration. There is only one widely recognized order within Thermococci, Thermococcales. Another proposed but not yet widely accepted order is Candidatus Methanofastidiosales. Thermococcales encompasses the family Thermococcaceae, which is composed of three genus: Palaeococcus, Pyrococcus and Thermococcus. Palaeococcus encompasses 3 species, while Pyrococcus and Thermococcus encompass 24 and 179 species, respectively.

== Morphology ==
Most species of thermophillic organisms, including thermophillic anaerobes, are chemoorganotrophic. As such, these bacteria obtain their energy through the oxidation of organic compounds to produce their energy. Other thermophilic bacteria include those which belong in the same nutritional category as some mesophilic bacteria.

One example is Thermogata, a species of bacteria found to ferment carbohydrates including xylan, glucose, and starch. It is a species of hyperthermophilic bacteria, which has been found in several geothermal-heated environments globally, including oil reservoirs, and submarine hot springs.

== Enzymatic function ==
Thermophilic bacteria are considered extremophilic microorganisms, which have developed many molecular strategies to survive harsh conditions, and utilize organic compounds including polymers such as starch. Belong to several taxonomic groups, the enzyme which a particular species uses can vary between species or subspecies. For example, starch is a rare deep-sea component found near hydrothermal vents; The presence of starch-hydrolyzing enzymes in microorganisms living in these niches provides these microorganisms with the ability to degrade glycogen and obtain nutrients. Further, glycogen can act as a storage material within the cell, suggesting that starch-hydrolyzing enzymes play a key role in the survival of extremophiles, as they are found to be very abundant. Enzymes such as these, including amylases, and glucoamylases, play key roles in chemical, food, and pharmaceutical industries. However, it has been shown that the level of starch-hydrolyzing enzymes is too low within this species to serve a biotechnological application.

Some species such as Thermococcus gammatolerans is strictly anaerobic, and is the most radioresistant known amongst archaea. It is species such as these that allow for researchers to study DNA repair mechanisms in harsh conditions. A key protein produced is the Proliferation Cell Nuclear Antigen (PCNA), which aids DNA repair by sliding along the DNA duplex and coordinating protein activity. Thereby,it provides a unique model to study DNA replication from.
