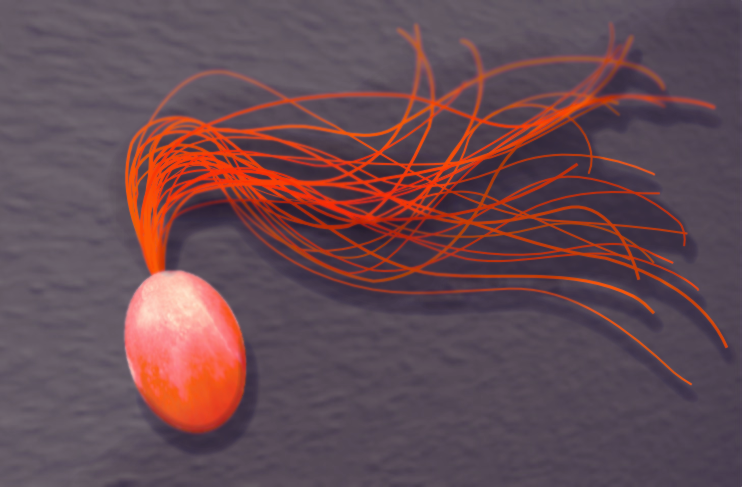
- Painting simulating a SEM picture of Pyrococcus furiosus

Scientific classification
- Domain: Archaea
- Kingdom: Methanobacteriati
- Phylum: Methanobacteriota
- Class: Thermococci
- Order: Thermococcales
- Family: Thermococcaceae; Zillig et al. 1988

Genera
- Palaeococcus; Pyrococcus; Thermococcus

= Thermococcaceae =

Family of archaea

Thermococcaceae is a family of archaeans in the order Thermococcales. Almost all species within the three genera of Thermococcaceae were isolated from hydrothermal vents in the ocean. All are strictly anaerobes.

== Phylogeny ==
The currently accepted taxonomy is based on the List of Prokaryotic names with Standing in Nomenclature (LPSN) and National Center for Biotechnology Information (NCBI).

16S rRNA based LTP_07_2026

- - - Palaeococcus
    - Thermococcus~1
  - - Pyrococcus
    - Thermococcus

53 marker proteins based GTDB 11-RS232

- - Palaeococcus Takai et al. 2000
  - - Thermococcus_A
    - - - Thermococcus_B
        - Pyrococcus Fiala & Stetter 1986
      - Thermococcus Zillig 1983

== See also ==
- List of Archaea genera
