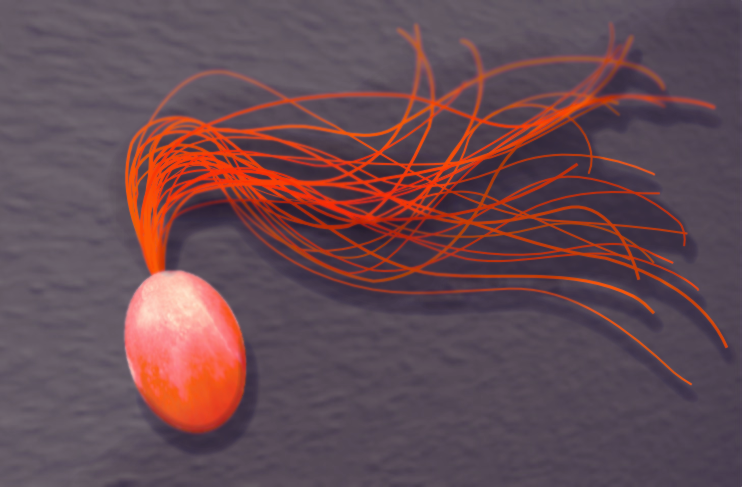
- Pyrococcus furiosus

Scientific classification
- Domain: Archaea
- Kingdom: Methanobacteriati
- Phylum: Methanobacteriota
- Class: Thermococci
- Order: Thermococcales; Zillig et al. 1988

Family
- Thermococcaceae

= Thermococcales =

Order of archaea

The Thermococcales are an order of microbes within the class Thermococci. The species within the Thermococcales are used in laboratories as model organisms. All these species are strict anaerobes and can ferment sugars as sources of carbon, but they also need elemental sulfur.

== See also ==
- List of Archaea genera
