= Α-Aminoadipate pathway =

Chemical compound

The amino acid L-lysine

The α-aminoadipate pathway (AAA pathway) is a biochemical pathway for the synthesis of the amino acid L-lysine. In the eukaryotes, this pathway is unique to several species of yeast, higher fungi (containing chitin in their cell walls), and the euglenids. It has been reported from bacteria of the genus Thermus and also in Pyrococcus horikoshii, potentially suggesting a wider distribution than previously thought. This uniqueness of the pathway makes it a potentially interesting target for antimycotics.

== Pathway overview ==
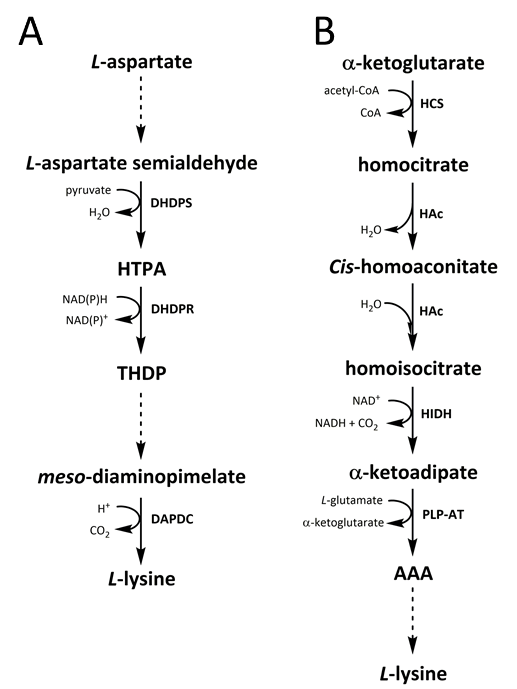
Comparison of parts of the diaminopimelate (DAP) pathway (left) and α-aminoadipate (AAA) pathway (right).

This pathway is a part of the glutamate family of amino acid biosynthetic pathways. The reaction steps in the pathway are similar to the citric acid cycle.

The first step in the pathway is condensation of acetyl-CoA with α-ketoglutarate, which gives homocitrate. This reaction is catalyzed by homocitrate synthase. Homocitrate is then converted to homoaconitate by homoaconitase and then to homoisocitrate. This is then decarboxylated by homoisocitrate dehydrogenase, which results in α-ketoadipate. A nitrogen atom is added from glutamate by aminoadipate aminotransferase to form the α-aminoadipate, from which this pathway gets its name. This is then reduced by aminoadipate reductase via an acyl-enzyme intermediate to a semialdehyde. Reaction with glutamate by one class of saccharopine dehydrogenase yields saccharopine which is then cleaved by a second saccharopine dehydrogenase to yield lysine and oxoglutarate.

Conversion of lysine to α-ketoadipate during degradation of lysine proceeds via the same steps, but in reverse.

== See also ==
- Adipic acid
