= Saccharopine dehydrogenase (disambiguation) =

Saccharopine dehydrogenase (SDH), also named Saccharopine reductase, is an enzyme involved in the metabolism of the amino acid lysine.

Saccharopine dehydrogenase may also refer to:

- Saccharopine dehydrogenase (NAD+, L-glutamate-forming)
- Saccharopine dehydrogenase (NAD+, L-lysine-forming)
- Saccharopine dehydrogenase (NADP+, L-glutamate-forming)
- Saccharopine dehydrogenase (NADP+, L-lysine-forming)
