= SscA RNA =

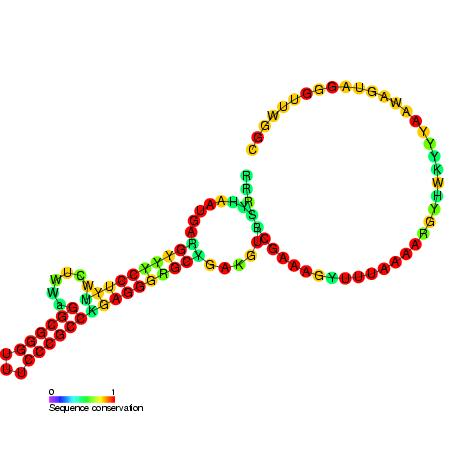
- Predicted secondary structure and sequence conservation of SscA

Identifiers
- Symbol: SscA
- Rfam: RF00063

Other data
- RNA type: Gene
- Domain: Archaea
- SO: SO:0000233
- PDB structures: PDBe

The SscA RNA (Secondary Structure Conserved A) gene was identified computationally in AT-rich hyperthermophiles using QRNA bioinformatics software. SscA is 97 nucleotides in length and is of unknown function.

The predicted distribution of SscA RNA is currently restricted to the genera pyrococcus and thermococcus (see Rfam page).

Other RNAs identified with SscA include HgcC, HgcE, HgcF and HgcG.
