= Homoaconitase =

Homoaconitase may refer to:

- Homoaconitate hydratase
- Methanogen homoaconitase
