= C7H10O7 =

The molecular formula C_{7}H_{10}O_{7} (molar mass: 206.15 g/mol, exact mass: 206.0427 u) may refer to:

- Homocitric acid
- Homoisocitric acid
