= 2-oxoadipate reductase =

Class of enzymes

Identifiers
- EC no.: 1.1.1.172
- CAS no.: 61116-21-0

Databases
- IntEnz: IntEnz view
- BRENDA: BRENDA entry
- ExPASy: NiceZyme view
- KEGG: KEGG entry
- MetaCyc: metabolic pathway
- PRIAM: profile
- PDB structures: RCSB PDB PDBe PDBsum
- Gene Ontology: AmiGO / QuickGO
Search
- PMC: articles
- PubMed: articles
- NCBI: proteins

In enzymology, 2-oxoadipate reductase (EC 1.1.1.172) is an enzyme that catalyzes the chemical reaction

(R)-2-hydroxyadipic acid
+ NAD^{+}
H^{+}
H^{+}
2-Oxoadipic acid
+ NADH

The two substrates of this enzyme are (R)-2-hydroxyadipic acid and oxidised nicotinamide adenine dinucleotide (NAD^{+}). Its products are 2-oxoadipic acid, reduced NADH, and a proton.

This enzyme belongs to the family of oxidoreductases, specifically those acting on the CH-OH group of donor with NAD^{+} or NADP^{+} as acceptor. The systematic name of this enzyme class is 2-hydroxyadipate:NAD^{+} 2-oxidoreductase. Other names in common use include 2-ketoadipate reductase, alpha-ketoadipate reductase, and 2-ketoadipate reductase.
