= FeMoco =

Cofactor of nitrogenase

Structure of the FeMo cofactor showing the sites of binding to nitrogenase The amino acids cysteine (Cys) and histidine (His) are indicated.

FeMoco (FeMo cofactor) or M-cluster is the primary cofactor of nitrogenase. Nitrogenase is the enzyme that catalyzes the conversion of atmospheric nitrogen molecules N_{2} into ammonia (NH_{3}) through the process known as nitrogen fixation. Because it contains iron and molybdenum, the cofactor is called FeMoco. Its stoichiometry is Fe_{7}MoS_{9}C.

== Structure ==
The FeMo cofactor is a cluster with composition Fe_{7}MoS_{9}C. This cluster can be viewed as two subunits composed of one Fe_{4}S_{3} (iron(III) sulfide) cluster and one MoFe_{3}S_{3} cluster. The two clusters are linked by three sulfide ligands and a bridging carbon atom. The unique iron (Fe) is anchored to the protein by a cysteine. It is also bound to three sulfides, resulting in tetrahedral molecular geometry. The additional six Fe centers in the cluster are each bonded to three sulfides. These six internal Fe centers define a trigonal prismatic arrangement around a central carbide center. The molybdenum is attached to three sulfides and is anchored to the protein by the imidazole group of a histidine residue. Also bound to Mo is a bidentate homocitrate cofactor, leading to octahedral geometry. Crystallographic analysis of the MoFe protein initially revealed the geometry and chemical composition of FeMoco, later confirmed by extended X-ray absorption fine-structure (EXAFS) studies. The Fe-S, Fe-Fe and Fe-Mo distances were determined to be 2.32, 2.64, and 2.73 Å respectively.

== Biosynthesis ==
Biosynthesis of FeMoco is a complicated process that requires several Nif gene products, specifically those of nifS, nifQ, nifB, nifE, nifN, nifV, nifH, nifD, and nifK (expressed as the proteins NifS, NifU, etc.). FeMoco assembly is proposed to be initiated by NifS and NifU which mobilize Fe and sulfide into small [Fe_{4}S_{4}] fragments. A pair of these fragments (K-cluster) are transferred to the NifB scaffold and arranged into a Fe_{7}MoS_{9}C L-cluster before transfer to the NifEN protein (encoded by nifE and nifN) and rearranged before delivery to the MoFe protein.

Several other factors participate in the biosynthesis. For example, NifV is the homocitrate synthase that supplies homocitrate to FeMoco. NifV, a protein factor, is proposed to be involved in the storage and/or mobilization of Mo. Fe protein is the electron donor for MoFe protein. These biosynthetic factors have been elucidated and characterized with the exact functions and sequence confirmed by biochemical, spectroscopic, and structural analyses.

== Identity of the core atom ==
The three proteins that play a direct role in the M-cluster synthesis are NifH, NifEN, and NifB. The NifB protein is responsible for the assembly of the Fe-S core of the cofactor; a process that involves stitching together two [4Fe-4S] clusters. NifB belongs to the SAM (S-adenosyl-L-methionine) enzyme superfamily. During the biosynthesis of the FeMo cofactor, NifB and its SAM cofactor are directly involved in the insertion of a carbon atom at the center of the Fe-S complex. An equivalent of SAM donates a methyl group, which becomes the interstitial carbide of the M-cluster. The methyl group of SAM is mobilized by radical removal of an H by a 5'-deoxyadenosine radical (5'-dA·). Presumably, a transient –CH2· radical is formed that is subsequently incorporated into the metal cluster forming a Fe_{6}-carbide species. The interstitial carbon remains associated with the FeMo cofactor after insertion into the nitrogenase, The nature of the central atom in FeMoco as a carbon species was identified in 2011. The approach for the identification relied on a combination of ^{13}C/^{15}N-labeling and pulsed EPR spectroscopy as well as X-ray crystallographic studies at full atomic resolution. Additionally, X-ray diffractometry was used to verify that there was a central carbon atom in the middle of the FeMo cofactor and x-ray emission spectroscopic studies showed that central atom was carbon due to the 2p→1s carbon-iron transition. The use of X-ray crystallography showed that while the FeMo cofactor is not in its catalytic form, the carbon keeps the structure rigid which helps describe the reactivity of nitrogenase.

== Electronic properties ==
According to the analysis by electron paramagnetic resonance spectroscopy, the resting state of the FeMo cofactor has a spin state of S=3/2. Upon one-electron reduction, the cofactor becomes EPR silent. Understanding the process in which an electron is transferred in the protein adduct shows a more precise kinetic model of the FeMo cofactor. Density functional theory calculations as well as spatially resolved anomalous dispersion refinement have suggested that the formal oxidation state is Mo^{IV}-2Fe^{II}-5Fe^{III}-C^{4−}-H^{+}, but the "true" oxidation states have not been confirmed experimentally.

== Substrate binding ==
The location of substrate attachment to the complex has yet to be elucidated. It is believed that the Fe atoms closest to the interstitial carbon participate in substrate activation, but the terminal molybdenum is also a candidate for nitrogen fixation. X-ray crystallographic studies utilizing MoFe-protein and carbon monoxide (CO), which is isoelectronic to dinitrogen, demonstrated that carbon monoxide is binding to the Fe2-Fe6-edge of FeMoco. Additional studies showed simultaneous binding of two CO-molecules to FeMoco, providing a structural basis for biological Fischer-Tropsch-type chemistry. Se-incorporation studies in combination with time-resolved X-ray crystallography evidenced major structural rearrangements in the FeMoco-structure upon substrate binding events.

== Isolation ==
Isolation of the FeMo cofactor from nitrogenase is done through centrifugal sedimentation of nitrogenase into the MoFe protein and the Fe protein. The FeMo cofactor is extracted by treating the MoFe protein with acids. The first extraction is done with N,N-dimethylformamide and the second by a mixture of N-methylformamide and Na_{2}HPO_{4} before final sedimentation by centrifugation.
