= HgcF RNA =

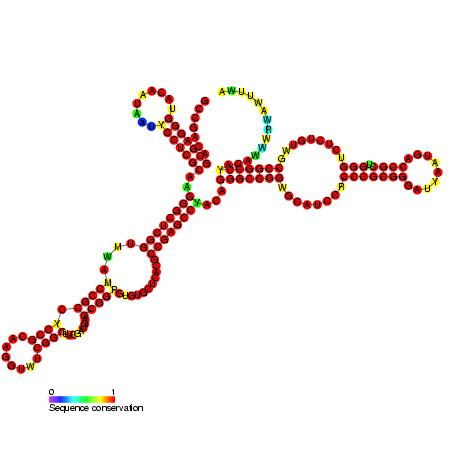
- Predicted secondary structure and sequence conservation of HgcF

Identifiers
- Symbol: HgcF
- Rfam: RF00058

Other data
- RNA type: Gene
- Domain(s): Archaea
- SO: SO:0000655
- PDB structures: PDBe

The HgcF RNA gene is a non-coding RNA identified computationally and experimentally verified in AT-rich hyperthermophiles. The genes were named hgcA through hgcG ("high GC"). It was later identified as Pab35 H/ACA snoRNA with rRNA targets.

== See also ==
- HgcC family RNA
- HgcE RNA
- HgcG RNA
- SscA RNA
