= Lysine =

Amino acid

- Skeletal formula of L-lysine

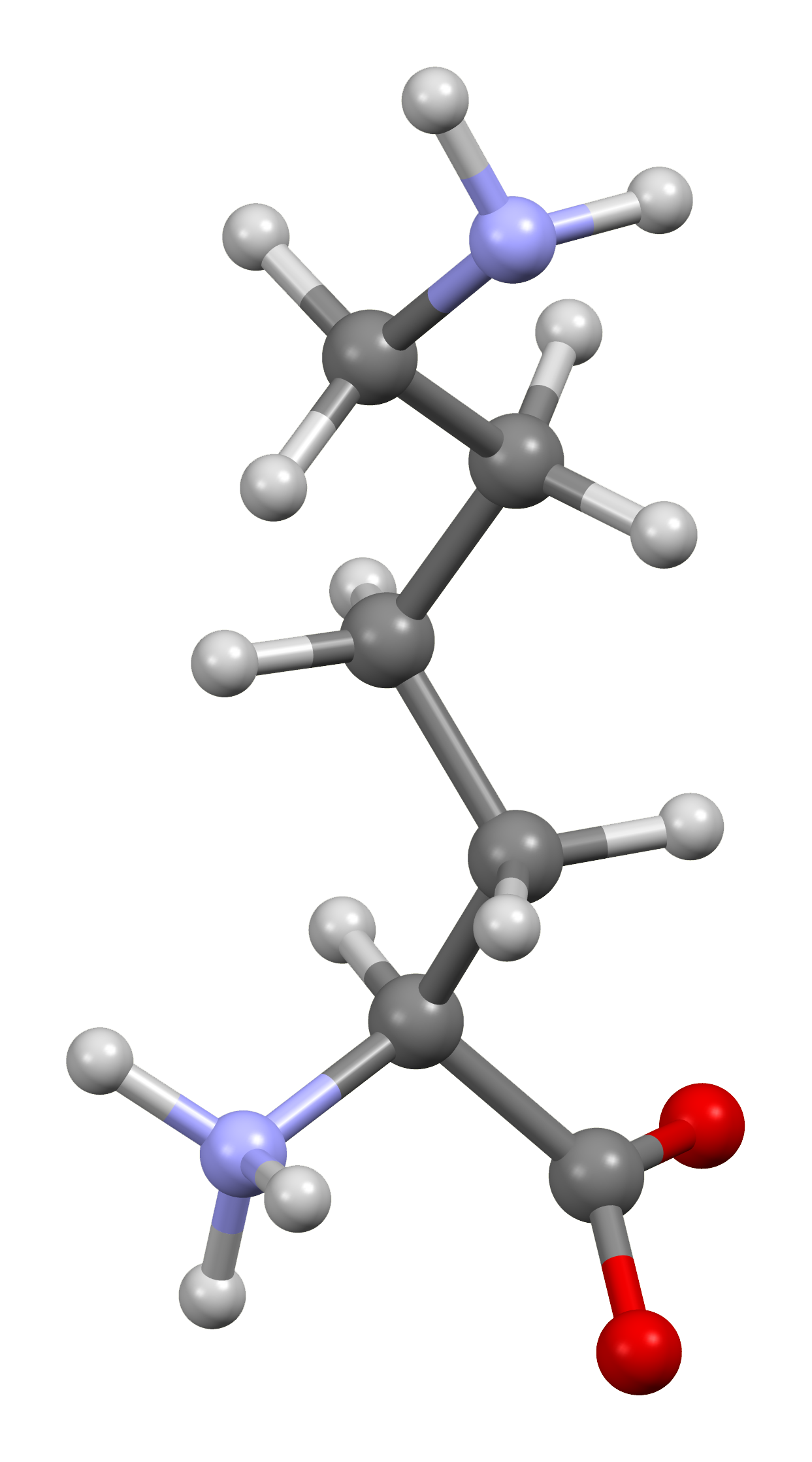
Ball-and-stick model (zwitterionic)
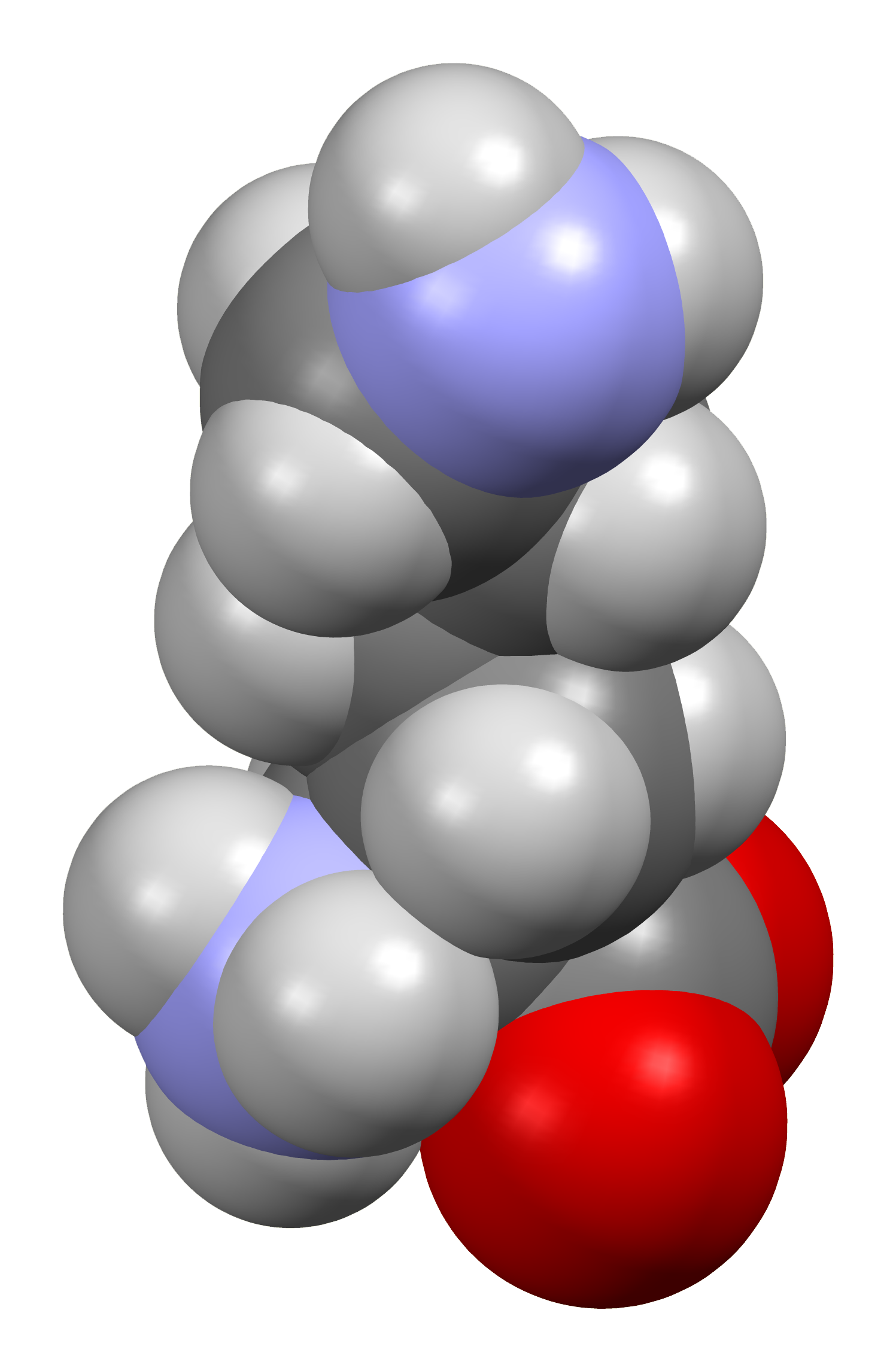
Space-filling model (zwitterionic)

Names
- IUPAC name Lysine
- Systematic IUPAC name 2,6-Diaminohexanoic acid
- Other names Lysine, D-lysine, L-lysine, LYS, h-Lys-OH

Identifiers
CAS Number	70-54-2 DL; 56-87-1 L; 923-27-3 D
3D model (JSmol)	Interactive image; Zwitterion: Interactive image; Protonated zwitterion: Interactive image
ChEBI	CHEBI:25094
ChEMBL	ChEMBL28328
ChemSpider	843; 5747 L
ECHA InfoCard	100.000.673
IUPHAR/BPS	724
KEGG	C16440
PubChem CID	866
UNII	AI4RT59273 DL; K3Z4F929H6 L; 3HQ6U6424Q D
CompTox Dashboard (EPA)	DTXSID90859004
- InChI: InChI=1S/C6H14N2O2/c7-4-2-1-3-5(8)6(9)10/h5H,1-4,7-8H2,(H,9,10) Key: KDXKERNSBIXSRK-UHFFFAOYSA-N; InChI=1/C6H14N2O2/c7-4-2-1-3-5(8)6(9)10/h5H,1-4,7-8H2,(H,9,10) Key: KDXKERNSBIXSRK-UHFFFAOYAY
- SMILES: C(CCN)C[C@@H](C(=O)O)N; Zwitterion: C(CC[NH3+])C[C@@H](C(=O)[O-])N; Protonated zwitterion: C(CC[NH3+])C[C@@H](C(=O)[O-])[NH3+]

Properties
Chemical formula	C_{6}H_{14}N_{2}O_{2}
Molar mass	146.190 g·mol^{−1}
Solubility in water	1.5 kg/L

Pharmacology
ATC code	B05XB03 (WHO)

Supplementary data page
- Lysine (data page)
- Except where otherwise noted, data are given for materials in their standard state (at 25 °C [77 °F], 100 kPa). Infobox references

Lysine ball and stick model spinning

Lysine (symbol Lys or K; also L-lysine) is an α-amino acid that is a precursor to many proteins. Lysine contains an α-amino group (which is in the protonated −NH^{+}_{3} form when the lysine is dissolved in water at physiological pH), an α-carboxylic acid group (which is in the deprotonated −COO^{−} form when the lysine is dissolved in water at physiological pH), and a side chain (CH_{2})_{4}NH_{2} (which is partially protonated when the lysine is dissolved in water at physiological pH), and so it is classified as a basic, charged (in water at physiological pH), aliphatic amino acid. It is encoded by the codons AAA and AAG. Like almost all other amino acids, the α-carbon is chiral and lysine may refer to either enantiomer or a racemic mixture of both. For the purpose of this article, lysine will refer to the biologically active enantiomer L-lysine, where the α-carbon is in the S configuration.

The human body cannot synthesize lysine. It is essential in humans and must therefore be obtained from the diet. In organisms that synthesize lysine, two main biosynthetic pathways exist, the diaminopimelate and α-aminoadipate pathways, which employ distinct enzymes and substrates and are found in diverse organisms. Lysine catabolism occurs through one of several pathways, the most common of which is the saccharopine pathway.

Lysine plays several roles in humans, most importantly proteinogenesis, but also in the crosslinking of collagen polypeptides, uptake of essential mineral nutrients, and in the production of carnitine, which is key in fatty acid metabolism. Lysine is also often involved in histone modifications, and thus, impacts the epigenome. The ε-amino group often participates in hydrogen bonding and as a general base in catalysis. The ε-ammonium group (−NH^{+}_{3}) is attached to the fourth carbon from the α-carbon, which is attached to the carboxyl (−COOH) group.

Due to its importance in several biological processes, a lack of lysine can lead to several disease states including defective connective tissues, impaired fatty acid metabolism, anaemia, and systemic protein-energy deficiency. In contrast, an overabundance of lysine, caused by ineffective catabolism, can cause severe neurological disorders.

Lysine was first isolated by the German biological chemist Ferdinand Heinrich Edmund Drechsel in 1889 from hydrolysis of the protein casein, and thus named it Lysin, from Greek λύσις (lysis) 'loosening'. In 1902, the German chemists Emil Fischer and Fritz Weigert determined lysine's chemical structure by synthesizing it.

The one-letter symbol K was assigned to lysine for being alphabetically nearest, with L being assigned to the structurally simpler leucine, and M to methionine.

== Biosynthesis ==
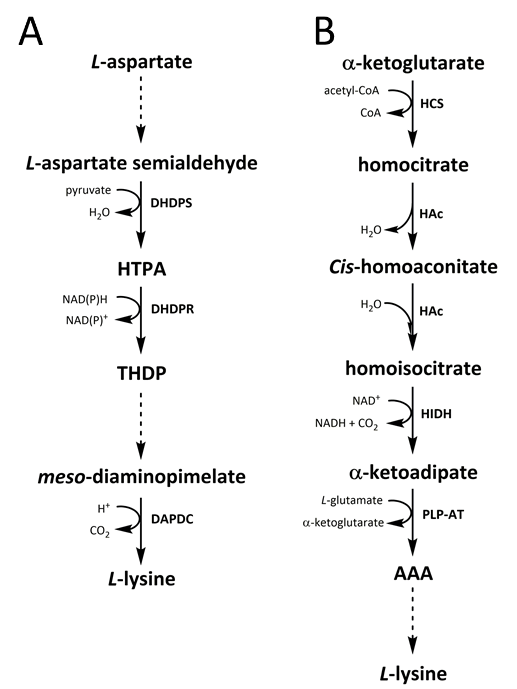
Lysine biosynthesis pathways. Two pathways are responsible for the de novo biosynthesis of L-lysine, namely the (A) diaminopimelate pathway and (B) α‑aminoadipate pathway.

Two pathways have been identified in nature for the synthesis of lysine. The diaminopimelate (DAP) pathway belongs to the aspartate derived biosynthetic family, which is also involved in the synthesis of threonine, methionine and isoleucine, whereas the α-aminoadipate (AAA) pathway is part of the glutamate biosynthetic family.

=== DAP pathway ===
The DAP pathway is found in both prokaryotes and plants and begins with the dihydrodipicolinate synthase (DHDPS) (E.C 4.3.3.7) catalysed condensation reaction between the aspartate derived, L-aspartate semialdehyde, and pyruvate to form (4S)-4-hydroxy-2,3,4,5-tetrahydro-(2S)-dipicolinic acid (HTPA). The product is then reduced by dihydrodipicolinate reductase (DHDPR) (E.C 1.3.1.26), with NAD(P)H as a proton donor, to yield 2,3,4,5-tetrahydrodipicolinate (THDP). From this point on, four pathway variations have been found, namely the acetylase, aminotransferase, dehydrogenase, and succinylase pathways. Both the acetylase and succinylase variant pathways use four enzyme catalysed steps, the aminotransferase pathway uses two enzymes, and the dehydrogenase pathway uses a single enzyme. These four variant pathways converge at the formation of the penultimate product, meso‑diaminopimelate, which is subsequently enzymatically decarboxylated in an irreversible reaction catalysed by diaminopimelate decarboxylase (DAPDC) (E.C 4.1.1.20) to produce L-lysine. The DAP pathway is regulated at multiple levels, including upstream at the enzymes involved in aspartate processing as well as at the initial DHDPS catalysed condensation step. Lysine imparts a strong negative feedback loop on these enzymes and, subsequently, regulates the entire pathway.

=== AAA pathway ===
The AAA pathway involves the condensation of α-ketoglutarate and acetyl-CoA via the intermediate AAA for the synthesis of L-lysine. This pathway has been shown to be present in several yeast species, as well as protists and higher fungi. It has also been reported that an alternative variant of the AAA route has been found in Thermus thermophilus and Pyrococcus horikoshii, which could indicate that this pathway is more widely spread in prokaryotes than originally proposed. The first and rate-limiting step in the AAA pathway is the condensation reaction between acetyl-CoA and α‑ketoglutarate catalysed by homocitrate-synthase (HCS) (E.C 2.3.3.14) to give the intermediate homocitryl‑CoA, which is hydrolysed by the same enzyme to produce homocitrate. Homocitrate is enzymatically dehydrated by homoaconitase (HAc) (E.C 4.2.1.36) to yield cis-homoaconitate. HAc then catalyses a second reaction in which cis-homoaconitate undergoes rehydration to produce homoisocitrate. The resulting product undergoes an oxidative decarboxylation by homoisocitrate dehydrogenase (HIDH) (E.C 1.1.1.87) to yield α‑ketoadipate. AAA is then formed via a pyridoxal 5′-phosphate (PLP)-dependent aminotransferase (PLP-AT) (E.C 2.6.1.39), using glutamate as the amino donor. From this point on, the AAA pathway varies with [something is missing here ? -> at the very least, section header! ] on the kingdom. In fungi, AAA is reduced to α‑aminoadipate-semialdehyde via AAA reductase (E.C 1.2.1.95) in a unique process involving both adenylation and reduction that is activated by a phosphopantetheinyl transferase (E.C 2.7.8.7). Once the semialdehyde is formed, saccharopine reductase (E.C 1.5.1.10) catalyses a condensation reaction with glutamate and NAD(P)H, as a proton donor, and the imine is reduced to produce the penultimate product, saccharopine. The final step of the pathway in fungi involves the saccharopine dehydrogenase (SDH) (E.C 1.5.1.8) catalysed oxidative deamination of saccharopine, resulting in L-lysine. In a variant AAA pathway found in some prokaryotes, AAA is first converted to N‑acetyl-α-aminoadipate, which is phosphorylated and then reductively dephosphorylated to the ε-aldehyde. The aldehyde is then transaminated to N‑acetyllysine, which is deacetylated to give L-lysine. However, the enzymes involved in this variant pathway need further validation.

== Catabolism ==
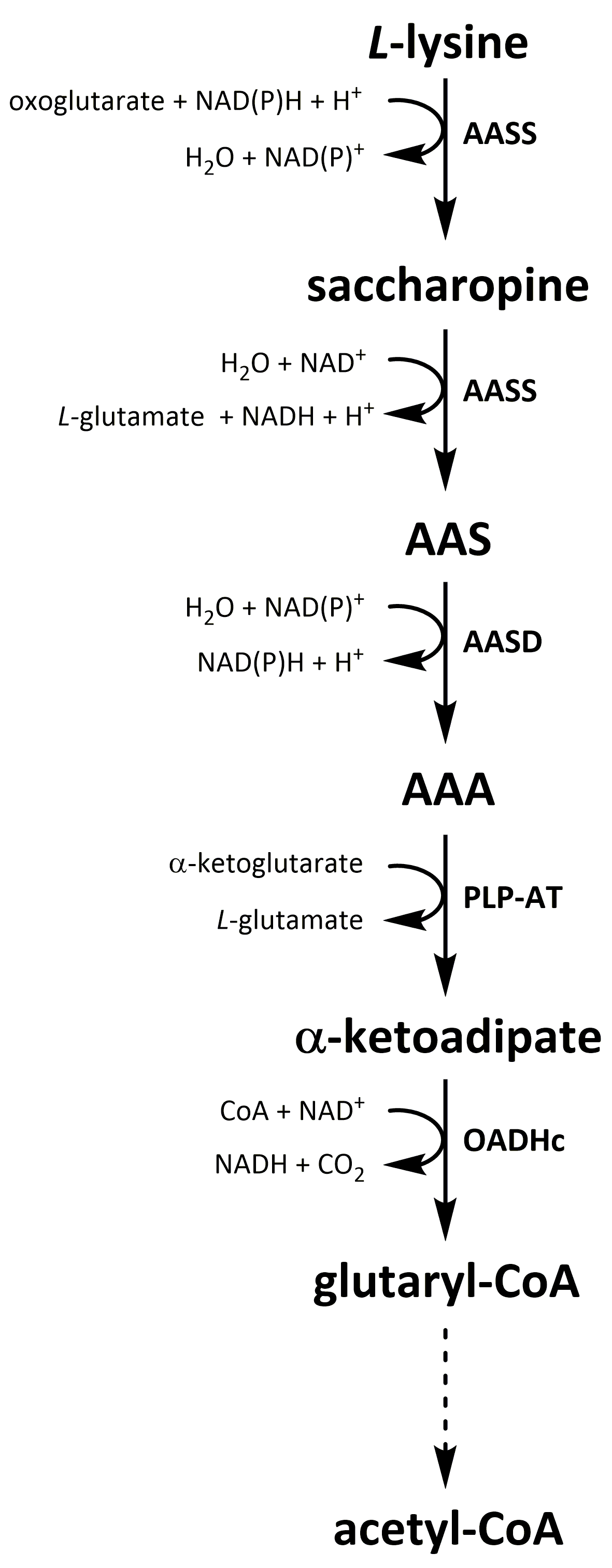
Saccharopine lysine catabolism pathway. The saccharopine pathway is the most prominent pathway for the catabolism of lysine.

As with all amino acids, catabolism of lysine is initiated from the uptake of dietary lysine or from the breakdown of intracellular protein. Catabolism is also used as a means to control the intracellular concentration of free lysine and maintain a steady-state to prevent the toxic effects of excessive free lysine. There are several pathways involved in lysine catabolism but the most commonly used is the saccharopine pathway, which primarily takes place in the liver (and equivalent organs) in animals, specifically within the mitochondria. This is the reverse of the previously described AAA pathway. In animals and plants, the first two steps of the saccharopine pathway are catalysed by the bifunctional enzyme, α-aminoadipic semialdehyde synthase (AASS), which possess both lysine-ketoglutarate reductase (LKR) (E.C 1.5.1.8) and SDH activities, whereas in other organisms, such as bacteria and fungi, both of these enzymes are encoded by separate genes. The first step involves the LKR catalysed reduction of L-lysine in the presence of α-ketoglutarate to produce saccharopine, with NAD(P)H acting as a proton donor. Saccharopine then undergoes a dehydration reaction, catalysed by SDH in the presence of NAD^{+}, to produce AAS and glutamate. AAS dehydrogenase (AASD) (E.C 1.2.1.31) then further dehydrates the molecule into AAA. Subsequently, PLP-AT catalyses the reverse reaction to that of the AAA biosynthesis pathway, resulting in AAA being converted to α-ketoadipate. The product, α‑ketoadipate, is decarboxylated in the presence of NAD^{+} and coenzyme A to yield glutaryl-CoA, however the enzyme involved in this is yet to be fully elucidated. Some evidence suggests that the 2-oxoadipate dehydrogenase complex (OADHc), which is structurally homologous to the E1 subunit of the oxoglutarate dehydrogenase complex (OGDHc) (E.C 1.2.4.2), is responsible for the decarboxylation reaction. Finally, glutaryl-CoA is oxidatively decarboxylated to crotonyl-CoA by glutaryl-CoA dehydrogenase (E.C 1.3.8.6), which goes on to be further processed through multiple enzymatic steps to yield acetyl-CoA; an essential carbon metabolite involved in the tricarboxylic acid cycle (TCA).

== Nutritional value ==
Lysine is an essential amino acid in humans. The human daily nutritional requirement varies from ~60 mg/kg in infancy to ~30 mg/kg in adults. This requirement is commonly met in a western society with the intake of lysine from meat and vegetable sources well in excess of the recommended requirement. In vegetarian diets, the intake of lysine is less due to the limited quantity of lysine in cereal crops compared to meat sources.

Given the limiting concentration of lysine in cereal crops, it has long been speculated that the content of lysine can be increased through genetic modification practices. Often these practices have involved the intentional dysregulation of the DAP pathway by means of introducing lysine feedback-insensitive orthologues of the DHDPS enzyme. These methods have met limited success likely due to the toxic side effects of increased free lysine and indirect effects on the TCA cycle. Plants accumulate lysine and other amino acids in the form of seed storage proteins, found within the seeds of the plant, and this represents the edible component of cereal crops. This highlights the need to not only increase free lysine, but also direct lysine towards the synthesis of stable seed storage proteins, and subsequently, increase the nutritional value of the consumable component of crops. While genetic modification practices have met limited success, more traditional selective breeding techniques have allowed for the isolation of "Quality Protein Maize", which has significantly increased levels of lysine and tryptophan, also an essential amino acid. This increase in lysine content is attributed to an opaque-2 mutation that reduced the transcription of lysine-lacking zein-related seed storage proteins and, as a result, increased the abundance of other proteins that are rich in lysine. Commonly, to overcome the limiting abundance of lysine in livestock feed, industrially produced lysine is added. The industrial process includes the fermentative culturing of Corynebacterium glutamicum and the subsequent purification of lysine.

=== Dietary sources ===
Good sources of lysine are high-protein foods such as eggs, meat (specifically red meat, lamb, pork, and poultry), soy, beans and peas, cheese (particularly Parmesan), and certain fish (such as cod and sardines). Lysine is the limiting amino acid (the essential amino acid found in the smallest quantity in the particular foodstuff) in most cereal grains, but is plentiful in most pulses (legumes). Beans contain the lysine that maize lacks, and in the human archeological record beans and maize often appear together, as in the Three Sisters: beans, maize, and squash.

A food is considered to have sufficient lysine if it has at least 51 mg of lysine per gram of protein (so that the protein is 5.1% lysine). L-lysine HCl is used as a dietary supplement, providing 80.03% L-lysine. As such, 1 g of L-lysine is contained in 1.25 g of L-lysine HCl.

== Biological roles ==
The most common role for lysine is proteinogenesis. Lysine frequently plays an important role in protein structure. Since its side chain contains a positively charged group on one end and a long hydrophobic carbon tail close to the backbone, lysine is considered somewhat amphipathic. For this reason, lysine can be found buried as well as more commonly in solvent channels and on the exterior of proteins, where it can interact with the aqueous environment. Lysine can also contribute to protein stability as its ε-amino group often participates in hydrogen bonding, salt bridges and covalent interactions to form a Schiff base.

A second major role of lysine is in epigenetic regulation by means of histone modification. There are several types of covalent histone modifications, which commonly involve lysine residues found in the protruding tail of histones. Modifications often include the addition or removal of an acetyl (−CH_{3}CO) forming acetyllysine or reverting to lysine, up to three methyl (−CH_{3}), ubiquitin or a sumo protein group. The various modifications have downstream effects on gene regulation, in which genes can be activated or repressed.

Lysine has also been implicated to play a key role in other biological processes including; structural proteins of connective tissues, calcium homeostasis, and fatty acid metabolism. Lysine has been shown to be involved in the crosslinking between the three helical polypeptides in collagen, resulting in its stability and tensile strength. This mechanism is akin to the role of lysine in bacterial cell walls, in which lysine (and meso-diaminopimelate) are critical to the formation of crosslinks, and therefore, stability of the cell wall. This concept has previously been explored as a means to circumvent the unwanted release of potentially pathogenic genetically modified bacteria. It was proposed that an auxotrophic strain of Escherichia coli (_{X}1776) could be used for all genetic modification practices, as the strain is unable to survive without the supplementation of DAP, and thus, cannot live outside of a laboratory environment. Lysine has also been proposed to be involved in calcium intestinal absorption and renal retention, and thus, may play a role in calcium homeostasis. Finally, lysine has been shown to be a precursor for carnitine, which transports fatty acids to the mitochondria, where they can be oxidised for the release of energy. Carnitine is synthesised from trimethyllysine, which is a product of the degradation of certain proteins, as such lysine must first be incorporated into proteins and be methylated prior to being converted to carnitine. However, in mammals the primary source of carnitine is through dietary sources, rather than through lysine conversion.

In opsins like rhodopsin and the visual opsins (encoded by the genes OPN1SW, OPN1MW, and OPN1LW), retinaldehyde forms a Schiff base with a conserved lysine residue, and interaction of light with the retinylidene group causes signal transduction in color vision (See visual cycle for details).

=== Disputed roles ===
There has been a long discussion that lysine, when administered intravenously or orally, can significantly increase the release of growth hormones. This has led to athletes using lysine as a means of promoting muscle growth while training, however, no significant evidence to support this application of lysine has been found to date.

Because herpes simplex virus (HSV) proteins are richer in arginine and poorer in lysine than the cells they infect, lysine supplements have been tried as a treatment. Since the two amino acids are taken up in the intestine, reclaimed in the kidney, and moved into cells by the same amino acid transporters, an abundance of lysine would, in theory, limit the amount of arginine available for viral replication. Clinical studies do not provide good evidence for effectiveness as a prophylactic or in the treatment for HSV outbreaks. In response to product claims that lysine could improve immune responses to HSV, a review by the European Food Safety Authority found no evidence of a cause–effect relationship. The same review, published in 2011, found no evidence to support claims that lysine could lower cholesterol, increase appetite, contribute to protein synthesis in any role other than as an ordinary nutrient, or increase calcium absorption or retention.

== Roles in disease ==
Diseases related to lysine are a result of the downstream processing of lysine, i.e., the incorporation into proteins or modification into alternative biomolecules. The role of lysine in collagen has been outlined above, however, a lack of lysine and hydroxylysine involved in the crosslinking of collagen peptides has been linked to a disease state of the connective tissue. As carnitine is a key lysine-derived metabolite involved in fatty acid metabolism, a substandard diet lacking sufficient carnitine and lysine can lead to decreased carnitine levels, which can have significant cascading effects on an individual's health. Lysine has also been shown to play a role in anaemia, as lysine is suspected to have an effect on the uptake of iron and, subsequently, the concentration of ferritin in blood plasma. However, the exact mechanism of action is yet to be elucidated. Most commonly, lysine deficiency is seen in non-western societies and manifests as protein-energy malnutrition, which has profound and systemic effects on the health of the individual. There is also a hereditary genetic disease that involves mutations in the enzymes responsible for lysine catabolism, namely the bifunctional AASS enzyme of the saccharopine pathway. Due to a lack of lysine catabolism, the amino acid accumulates in plasma and patients develop hyperlysinaemia, which can present as asymptomatic to severe neurological disabilities, including epilepsy, ataxia, spasticity, and psychomotor impairment. The clinical significance of hyperlysinemia is the subject of debate in the field with some studies finding no correlation between physical or mental disabilities and hyperlysinemia. In addition to this, mutations in genes related to lysine metabolism have been implicated in several disease states, including pyridoxine-dependent epilepsia (ALDH7A1 gene), α-ketoadipic and α-aminoadipic aciduria (DHTKD1 gene), and glutaric aciduria type 1 (GCDH gene).

Hyperlysinuria is marked by high amounts of lysine in the urine. It is often due to a metabolic disease in which a protein involved in the breakdown of lysine is non functional due to a genetic mutation. It may also occur due to a failure of renal tubular transport.

== Use of lysine in animal feed ==
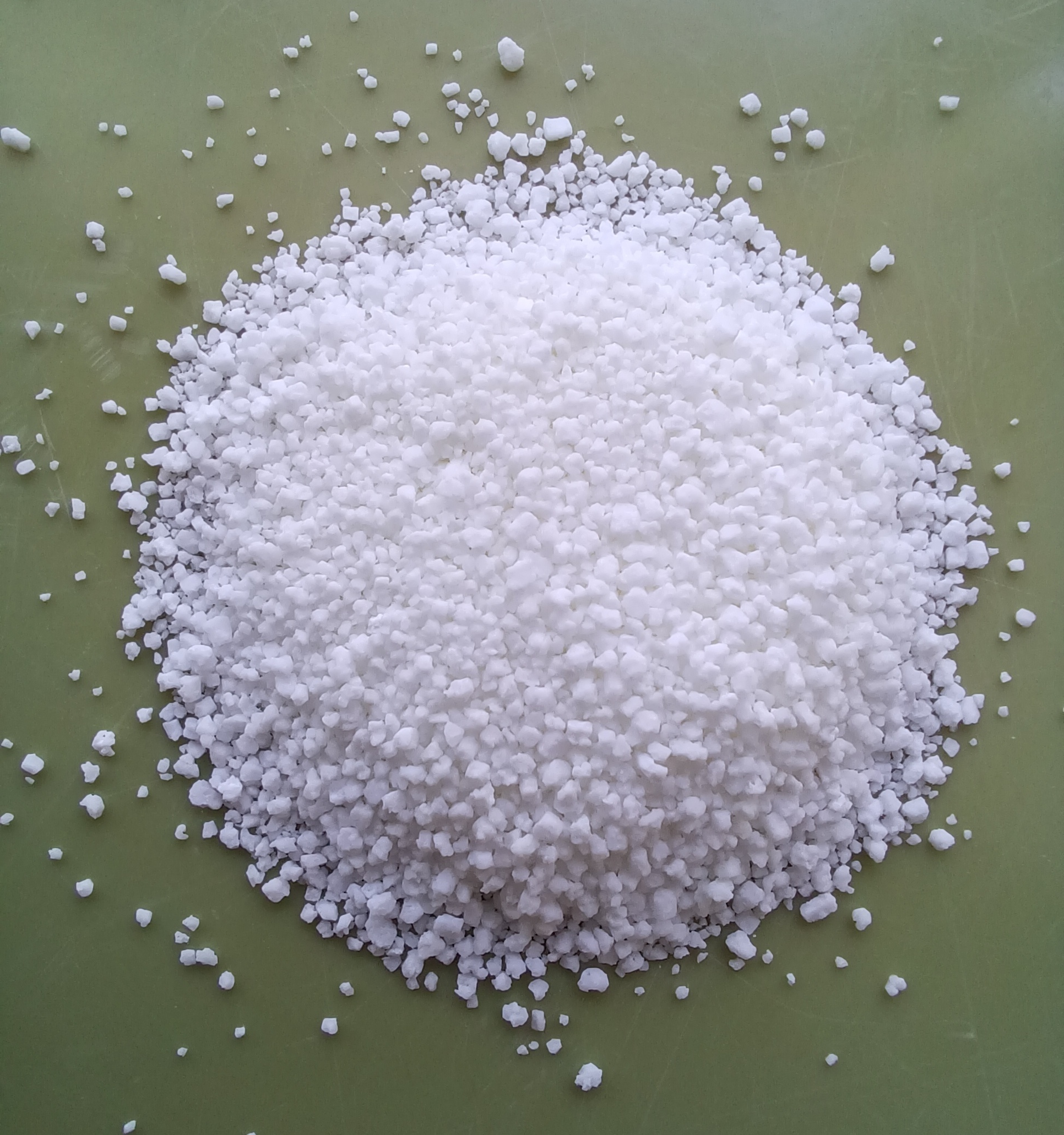
Lysine sold as a supplement for cats

Lysine production for animal feed is a major global industry, reaching in 2009 almost 700,000 tons for a market value of over €1.22 billion. Lysine is an important additive to animal feed because it is a limiting amino acid when optimizing the growth of certain animals such as pigs and chickens for the production of meat. Lysine supplementation allows for the use of lower-cost plant protein (maize, for instance, rather than soy) while maintaining high growth rates, and limiting the pollution from nitrogen excretion. In turn, however, phosphate pollution is a major environmental cost when corn is used as feed for poultry and swine.

Lysine is industrially produced by microbial fermentation, from a base mainly of sugar. Genetic engineering research is actively pursuing bacterial strains to improve the efficiency of production and allow lysine to be made from other substrates. The most common bacteria used is Corynebacterium glutamicum specially mutagenized or gene-engineered to produce lysine, but analogous strains of Escherichia coli are also employed.

== In popular culture ==
The 1993 film Jurassic Park, which is based on the 1990 novel Jurassic Park by Michael Crichton, features dinosaurs that were genetically altered so that they could not produce lysine, an example of engineered auxotrophy. This was known as the "lysine contingency" and was supposed to prevent the cloned dinosaurs from surviving outside the park, forcing them to depend on lysine supplements provided by the park's veterinary staff. In reality, no animal can produce lysine; it is an essential amino acid.

In 1996, lysine became the focus of a price-fixing case, the largest in United States history. The Archer Daniels Midland Company paid a fine of US$100 million, and three of its executives were convicted and served prison time. Also found guilty in the price-fixing case were two Japanese firms (Ajinomoto, Kyowa Hakko) and a South Korean firm (Sewon). Secret video recordings of the conspirators fixing lysine's price can be found online or by requesting the video from the U.S. Department of Justice, Antitrust Division. This case gave the basis for the book The Informant: A True Story, and the movie The Informant!.
