= Isocitrate—homoisocitrate dehydrogenase =

Class of enzymes

isocitrate—homoisocitrate dehydrogenase

Identifiers
- EC no.: 1.1.1.286
- CAS no.: 9001-58-5

Databases
- IntEnz: IntEnz view
- BRENDA: BRENDA entry
- ExPASy: NiceZyme view
- KEGG: KEGG entry
- MetaCyc: metabolic pathway
- PRIAM: profile
- PDB structures: RCSB PDB PDBe PDBsum
- Gene Ontology: AmiGO / QuickGO
Search
- PMC: articles
- PubMed: articles
- NCBI: proteins

Isocitrate—homoisocitrate dehydrogenase is an enzyme that catalyzes the following two reactions:

Isocitric acid
+ NAD^{+}
H^{+}
H^{+}
α-Ketoglutaric acid
+ CO_{2} + NADH
(-)-Homoisocitric acid
+ NAD^{+}
H^{+}
H^{+}
α-Ketoglutaric acid
+ CO_{2} + NADH
