= Pyrococcus C/D box small nucleolar RNA =

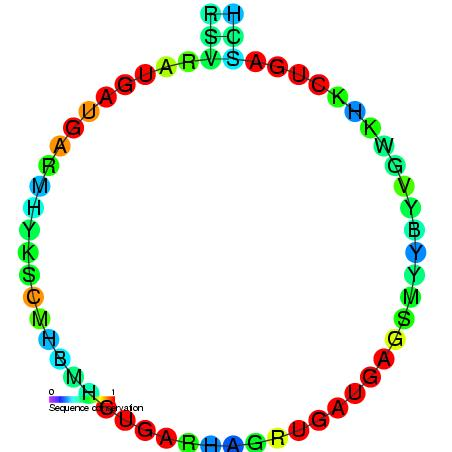
- Predicted secondary structure and sequence conservation of snoPyro_CD

Identifiers
- Symbol: snoPyro_CD
- Alt. Symbols: CD_sno_Pyro
- Rfam: RF00095

Other data
- RNA type: Gene; snRNA; snoRNA; CD-box
- Domain: Archaea
- GO: GO:0006396 GO:0005730
- SO: SO:0000593
- PDB structures: PDBe

In molecular biology, Pyrococcus C/D box small nucleolar RNA are non-coding RNA (ncRNA) molecules identified in the archaeal genus Pyrococcus which function in the modification of ribosomal RNA (rRNA) and transfer RNA (tRNA). This type of modifying RNA is usually located in the nucleolus of the eukaryotic cell, which is a major site of ribosomal RNA and snRNA biogenesis, but there is no corresponding visible structure in archaeal cells. This group of ncRNAs are known as small nucleolar RNAs (snoRNA) and also often referred to as a guide RNAs because they direct associated protein enzymes to add a modification to specific nucleotides in target RNAs. C/D box RNAs guide the addition of a methyl group (-CH_{3}) to the 2'-O position in the RNA backbone.

Computational screens of archaeal genomes have identified C/D box snoRNAs in a number of genomes. In particular 46 small RNAs were identified to be conserved in the genomes of three hyperthermophile Pyrococcus species.
