= Pyrobac-1 RNA motif =

Conserved RNA structure

Pyrobac-1 RNA
- Consensus secondary structure of Pyrobac-1 RNAs

Identifiers
- Symbol: Pyrobac-1
- Rfam: RF01722

Other data
- RNA type: sRNA
- Domain: Pyrobaculum
- PDB structures: PDBe

The Pyrobac-1 RNA motif is a conserved RNA structure discovered by bioinformatics. RNAs conforming to this motif have been found only in Pyrobaculum, a genus of archaea. Instances of the motif are hypothesized to function as non-coding RNAs. The motif has been shown to be part of sRNA202 and sRNA203 canonical and noncanonical pseudouridine guide RNAs (H/ACA RNA) in Pyrobaculum.
