= HgcE RNA =

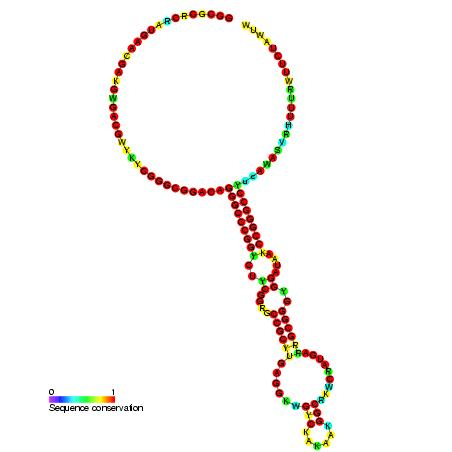
- Predicted secondary structure and sequence conservation of HgcE

Identifiers
- Symbol: HgcE
- Rfam: RF00060

Other data
- RNA type: Gene
- Domain: Archaea
- SO: SO:0000655
- PDB structures: PDBe

The HgcE RNA (also known as Pf3 RNA) gene is a non-coding RNA that was identified computationally and experimentally verified in AT-rich hyperthermophiles. The genes in the screen were named hgcA through hgcG ("high GC"). The HgcE has been renamed as Pf3 and identified as an H/ACA snoRNA that is suggested to target 23S rRNA for pseudouridylation. This RNA contains two K-turn motifs. It was later identified as Pab105 H/ACA snoRNA with rRNA targets.

== See also ==
- HgcC family RNA
- HgcF RNA
- HgcG RNA
- SscA RNA
