= LYSF =

LYSF may refer to:

- Homoaconitate hydratase
- Lift Your Skinny Fists Like Antennas to Heaven, 2000 album by Godspeed You! Black Emperor
