= Α-Aminoadipic acid =

α-Aminoadipic acid

Names
- IUPAC name 2-Aminohexanedioic acid
- Other names 2-Aminoadipic acid

Identifiers
CAS Number	542-32-5
3D model (JSmol)	Interactive image; Interactive image
Beilstein Reference	1724349
ChEBI	CHEBI:37024
ChEMBL	ChEMBL433238
ChemSpider	456
ECHA InfoCard	100.008.009
EC Number	208-809-2
MeSH	2-Aminoadipic+Acid
PubChem CID	469
UNII	1K7B1OED4N
CompTox Dashboard (EPA)	DTXSID90862154
- InChI: InChI=1S/C6H11NO4/c7-4(6(10)11)2-1-3-5(8)9/h4H,1-3,7H2,(H,8,9)(H,10,11) Key: OYIFNHCXNCRBQI-UHFFFAOYSA-N; InChI=1/C6H11NO4/c7-4(6(10)11)2-1-3-5(8)9/h4H,1-3,7H2,(H,8,9)(H,10,11) Key: OYIFNHCXNCRBQI-UHFFFAOYAC
- SMILES: C(CC(C(=O)O)N)CC(=O)O; O=C(O)CCCC(N)C(=O)O

Properties
Chemical formula	C_{6}H_{11}NO_{4}
Molar mass	161.156 g/mol
Appearance	Crystalline
Density	1.333 g/mL
Melting point	196 °C (385 °F; 469 K)
Boiling point	364 °C (687 °F; 637 K)

Hazards
- Occupational safety and health (OHS/OSH)
Main hazards	Irritant
- GHS labelling
Pictograms	(GHS07: Exclamation mark)
Signal word	Warning
Hazard statements	H317
Precautionary statements	P261, P272, P280, P302+P352, P321, P333+P317, P362+P364, P501
- Except where otherwise noted, data are given for materials in their standard state (at 25 °C [77 °F], 100 kPa). Infobox references

α-Aminoadipic acid is one of the metabolic precursor in the biosynthesis of lysine through α-aminoadipate pathway. Its conjugate base is α-aminoadipate, which is the prevalent form at physiological pH.

α-Aminoadipic acid has a stereogenic center and can appear in two enantiomers, L-α-aminoadipate and D-α-aminoadipate. The L-enantiomer appears during lysine biosynthesis and degradation, whereas the D-enantiomer is a part of certain antibiotics.

== Metabolism ==
=== Lysine degradation ===
Through saccharopine and allysine, lysine is converted to α-aminoadipate, which is then degraded all the way to acetoacetate. Allysine is oxidized by aminoadipate-semialdehyde dehydrogenase:

L-allysine
+ NAD^{+}
H_{2}O
H^{+}
H_{2}O
H^{+}
(S)-2-aminoadipic acid
+ NADH

α-Aminoadipate is then transaminated with α-ketoglutaric acid to give 2-oxooadipic acid and L-glutamic acid, respectively, by the action of 2-aminoadipate transaminase:

L-2-aminoadipic acid
+
α-Ketoglutaric acid
2-Oxoadipic acid
+
L-Glutamic acid

=== Lysine biosynthesis ===
α-Aminoadipate appears during biosynthesis of lysine in several yeast species, fungi, and certain protists. During this pathway, which is named after α-aminoadipate, the same steps are repeated in the opposite order as in the degradation reactions, namely, α-ketoadipate is transaminated to α-aminoadipate, which is then reduced to allysine, allysine couples with glutamate to give saccharopine, which is then cleaved to give lysine.

== Importance ==
A 2013 study identifieds α-aminoadipate as a novel predictor of the development of diabetes and suggested that it is a potential modulator of glucose homeostasis in humans.

D-α-Aminoadipic acid is a part of the antibiotic cephalosporin C.
