= HgcG RNA =

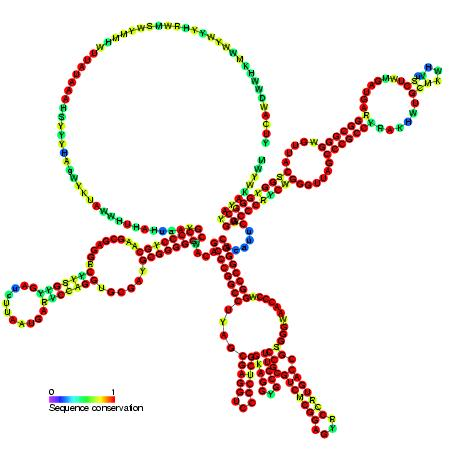
- Predicted secondary structure and sequence conservation of HgcG

Identifiers
- Symbol: HgcG
- Rfam: RF00064

Other data
- RNA type: Gene
- Domain(s): Archaea
- SO: SO:0000655
- PDB structures: PDBe

The HgcG RNA gene is a non-coding RNA that was identified computationally and experimentally verified in AT-rich hyperthermophiles. The genes from this screen were named hgcA through hgcG ("high GC"). HgcG is of unknown function. hgcG is significantly similar to a region of the Archaeoglobus fulgidus genome. The genes were named hgcA through hgcG ("high GC"). It was later identified as Pab40 H/ACA snoRNA with rRNA targets.

== See also ==
- HgcC family RNA
- HgcE RNA
- HgcF RNA
