= Homoaconitic acid =

- cis-Homoaconitic acid

- trans-Homoaconitic acid

Names
- IUPAC names (1Z)-1-Butene-1,2,4-tricarboxylic acid (1E)-1-Butene-1,2,4-tricarboxylic acid
- Other names Homo-cis-aconitate; Homo-trans-aconitate

Identifiers
CAS Number	13366-20-6; 7279-64-3 (Z); 7279-63-2 (E)
3D model (JSmol)	Interactive image
ChEBI	CHEBI:17516
ChemSpider	4444242 (Z)
KEGG	C04002
PubChem CID	5280640 (Z)
UNII	BPE4V564XP
CompTox Dashboard (EPA)	DTXSID201336349
- InChI: InChI=1S/C7H8O6/c8-5(9)2-1-4(7(12)13)3-6(10)11/h3H,1-2H2,(H,8,9)(H,10,11)(H,12,13)/b4-3- Key: BJYPZFUWWJSAKC-ARJAWSKDSA-N
- SMILES: O=C(O)C(=CC(=O)O)CCC(=O)O

Properties
Chemical formula	C_{7}H_{8}O_{6}
Molar mass	188.135 g·mol^{−1}
- Except where otherwise noted, data are given for materials in their standard state (at 25 °C [77 °F], 100 kPa). Infobox references

Homoaconitatic acid (homoaconitate) is related to aconitic acid but with one extra carbon. It is part of the α-aminoadipate pathway for lysine biosynthesis, where it is made from homoisocitric acid by homoisocitrate dehydrogenase.

(-)-Homoisocitric acid
H_{2}O
H_{2}O
cis-Homoaconitic acid
