= Pyridoxine-dependent epilepsy =

- Other names: Pyridoxine-dependent seizure (PDS), vitamin B6 responsive epilepsy
- Pyridoxine
- Specialty: Neurology

Pyridoxine-dependent epilepsy (PDE) is a rare disorder characterized by intractable seizures in the prenatal and neonatal period. The disorder was first recognized in the 1950s, with the first description provided by Hunt et al. in 1954. More recently, pathogenic variants within the ALDH7A1 gene have been identified to cause PDE.

== Genetics ==
PDE is inherited in an autosomal recessive manner and is estimated to affect around 1 in 400,000 to 700,000 births, though one study conducted in Germany estimated a prevalence of 1 in 20,000 births. The ALDH7A1 gene encodes for the enzyme antiquitin or α-aminoadipic semialdehyde dehydrogenase, which is involved with the catabolism of lysine.

== Treatment ==
Patients with PDE do not respond to anticonvulsant medications, but seizures rapidly cease with therapeutic intravenous doses of vitamin B_{6} and remission from seizures are often maintained on daily therapeutic doses of vitamin B_{6}. An optimal dose has not yet been established, but doses of 50–100 mg/day or 15–30 mg/kg/day have been proposed. Importantly, excessive doses of vitamin B_{6} can result in irreversible neurological damage, and therefore several guidelines recommend between 200 mg (neonates) and 500 mg per day as the maximal daily dose.

Despite remission of seizure activity with vitamin B_{6} supplementation, intellectual disability is frequently seen in patients with PDE. Because the affected enzyme antiquitin is involved in the cerebral lysine degradation pathway, lysine restriction as an additional treatment modality has recently been explored. Studies have been published which demonstrate potential for improved biomarkers, development, and behavior in patients treated with lysine restriction in addition to pyridoxine supplementation. In trial, lysine restriction of 70–100 mg/kg/day in children less than 1 year of age, 45–80 mg/kg/day in children between 1–7 years of age, and 20–45 mg/kg/day in children older than 7 years of age were prescribed. Despite the potential of additional benefit from lysine restriction, vitamin B6 supplementation remains the main-stay of treatment given lack of studies thus far demonstrating the safety and efficacy of lysine restriction for this purpose.

== Monitoring ==
Plasma and cerebrospinal fluid levels of pipecolic acid are frequently elevated in patients with PDE, though it is a non-specific biomarker. α-aminodipic semialdehyde is elevated in urine and plasma and is a more specific biomarker for PDE. Improvements in these biomarkers have been reported with the implementation of a lysine-restricted diet. Initial studies evaluating the safety and efficacy of lysine restriction evaluated developmental and cognitive outcomes by age-appropriate tests and parental observations.

== See also ==
- Early-onset vitamin B6-dependent epilepsy - pyridoxine-responsive epilepsy discovered in 2016 and caused by mutations of the PROSC gene.
- Hyperphosphatasia with mental retardation syndrome - in this rare syndrome, some patients have pyridoxine-dependent epilepsy.
