= Saccharopine dehydrogenase (NAD+, L-lysine-forming) =

Enzyme class

saccharopine dehydrogenase (NAD+, L-lysine-forming)
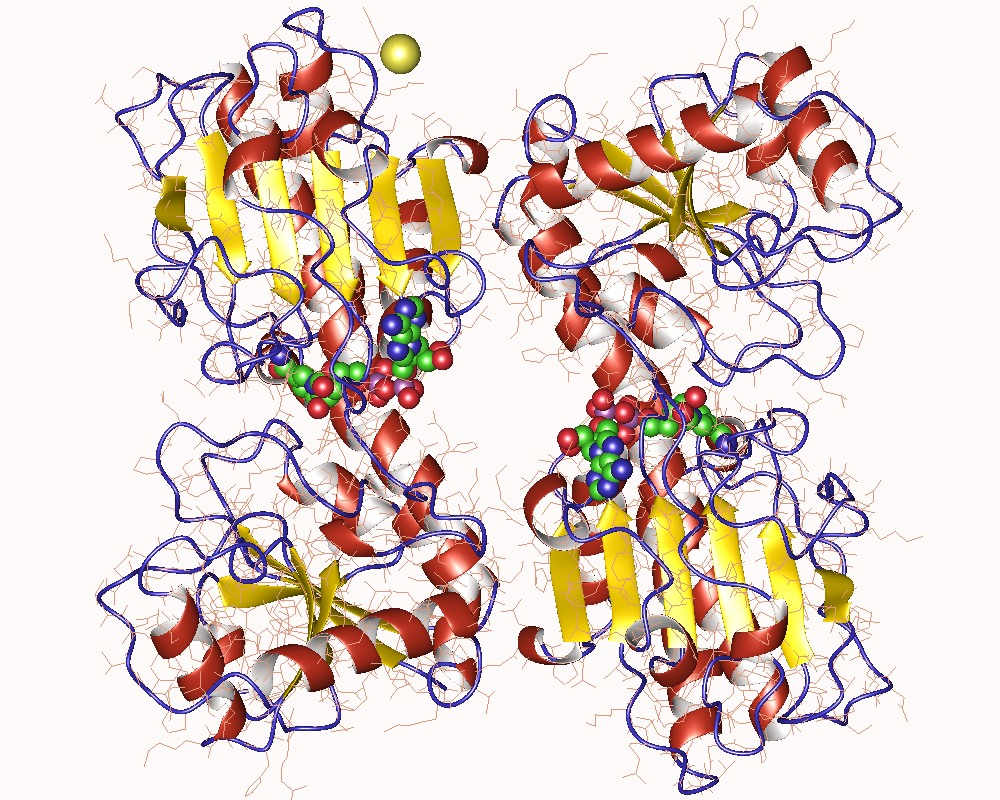
- Saccharopine dehydrogenase (L-lysine-forming) homodimer, Saccharomyces cerevisiae

Identifiers
- EC no.: 1.5.1.7
- CAS no.: 9073-96-5

Databases
- IntEnz: IntEnz view
- BRENDA: BRENDA entry
- ExPASy: NiceZyme view
- KEGG: KEGG entry
- MetaCyc: metabolic pathway
- PRIAM: profile
- PDB structures: RCSB PDB PDBe PDBsum
- Gene Ontology: AmiGO / QuickGO
Search
- PMC: articles
- PubMed: articles
- NCBI: proteins

In enzymology, saccharopine dehydrogenase (NAD+, L-lysine-forming) (EC 1.5.1.7) is an enzyme that catalyzes the chemical reaction

Saccharopine
+ NAD^{+}
H_{2}O
H^{+}
H_{2}O
H^{+}
L-lysine
+ NADH +
α-Ketoglutaric acid

The three substrates of this enzyme are saccharopine, oxidised nicotinamide adenine dinucleotide (NAD^{+}), and water. Its products are L-lysine, reduced NADH, α-ketoglutaric acid, and a proton.

This enzyme belongs to the family of oxidoreductases, specifically those acting on the CH-NH group of donors with NAD+ or NADP+ as acceptor. The systematic name of this enzyme class is N6-(L-1,3-dicarboxypropyl)-L-lysine:NAD+ oxidoreductase (L-lysine-forming). Other names in common use include lysine-2-oxoglutarate reductase, dehydrogenase, saccharopine (nicotinamide adenine dinucleotide,, lysine forming), epsilon-N-(L-glutaryl-2)-L-lysine:NAD oxidoreductase (L-lysine, forming), N6-(glutar-2-yl)-L-lysine:NAD oxidoreductase (L-lysine-forming), 6-N-(L-1,3-dicarboxypropyl)-L-lysine:NAD+ oxidoreductase, and (L-lysine-forming). This enzyme participates in lysine biosynthesis and lysine degradation.

== Structural studies ==
As of late 2007, only one structure has been solved for this class of enzymes, with the PDB accession code 1FF9.
