= Pyrobaculum asR3 small RNA =

xxx sRNA
- Predicted secondary structure and sequence conservation of Pyrobaculum asRNA3

Identifiers
- Rfam: RF02793

Other data
- Domain: Archaea
- GO: GO:0003729
- SO: SO:0000077,SO:0000370
- PDB structures: PDBe

asR3 is an archeal small RNA identified in seven Pyrobaculum species. The genus-specific nature can indicate this could be recent, stable adaptation. asR3 binds to the 3′-end of the tpi gene (triose-phosphate-isomerse). The tpi mRNA has a conserved structural element located close to the stop codon. Binding of the asR3 may be able to compete against the formation of the tpi element structure and this may modulate the function of this highly conserved element.

== See also ==
Other archaeal sRNAs:

- Archaeal H/ACA sRNA
- Methanosarcina sRNA162
