= Lysine (data page) =

Chemical data page

The complete data for Lysine
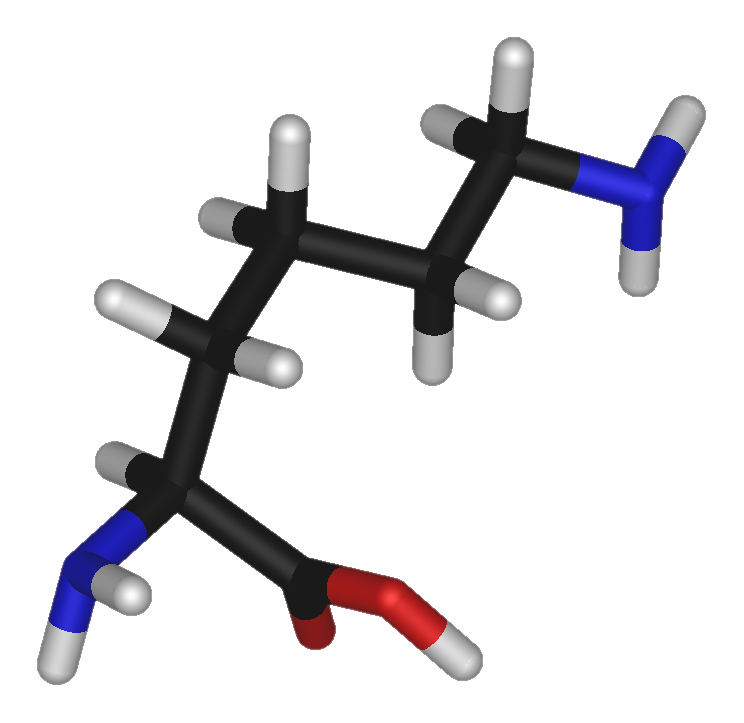
General information
Chemical formula: C_{6}H_{14}N_{2}O_{2}
Molar mass: 146.19 g·mol^{−1}
Systematic name:
-2,6-Diaminohexanoic acid
Abbreviations: K, Lys
Synonyms:
none
Database data
SMILES: NCCCCC(N)C(=O)O
InChI=1/C6H14N2O2/c7-4-2-1-3-5(8)6(9)10/h5H,1-4,7-8H2,(H,9,10)/f/h9H

ATC: N/A	CAS: 56-87-1	DrugBank: N/A	EINECS: 200-294-2 ^{a}	PubChem: 866 (DL) ^{a}, 5962 (L) ^{a}

Physical properties

Structure	Crystal data	Spectral data: UV-Vis / IR / NMR / MS

Phase behavior	Solid properties T_{m}: 224 °C	Liquid properties	Gas properties

Hazard properties

MSDS N/A	Main hazards: N/A	NFPA 704	Flash point: N/A	RTECS number: N/A

Chemical properties

XLogP: -2.926	pI: 9.74	pK_{a}: 2.15, 9.16, 10.67	Tautomers:	Hydrogen bond: donor - 3; acceptor - 4

Pharmacological properties

This box:
- Except where noted otherwise, data relate to Standard temperature and pressure.
- Reliability of data general note.
