= ALDH7A1 =

Protein-coding gene in the species Homo sapiens

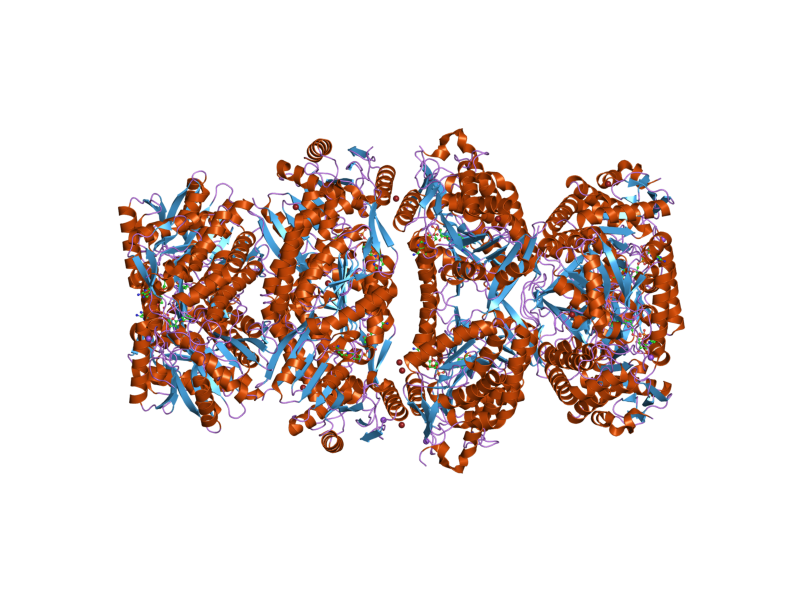

Identifiers
- Aliases: ALDH7A1, ATQ1, EPD, PDE, aldehyde dehydrogenase 7 family member A1
- External IDs: OMIM: 107323; MGI: 108186; GeneCards: ALDH7A1
Available structures
PDB	Ortholog search: PDBe RCSB
PDB	List of PDB id codes 2J6L, 4X0T, 4X0U, 4ZUK, 4ZUL, 4ZVW, 4ZVX, 4ZVY
Enzyme activity
EC #	BRENDA	ExPASy	KEGG	MetaCyc
1.2.1.3	↗	↗	↗	↗
1.2.1.8	↗	↗	↗	↗
1.2.1.31	↗	↗	↗	↗

Gene location (Human)
Chr.	Chromosome 5 (human)
Band	5q23.2	Start	126,531,200 bp
Band	5q23.2	End	126,595,362 bp

Gene location (Mouse)
Chr.	Chromosome 18 (mouse)
Band	18 D3|18 30.55 cM	Start	56,642,759 bp
Band	18 D3|18 30.55 cM	End	56,706,023 bp
RNA expression pattern
Bgee	Human / Mouse (ortholog); Top expressed in: right lobe of liver; ventricular zone; left ovary; right ovary; right adrenal cortex; ganglionic eminence; amygdala; left adrenal gland; left adrenal cortex; stromal cell of endometrium / Top expressed in: left lobe of liver; seminal vesicula; yolk sac; lacrimal gland; human kidney; right kidney; choroid plexus of fourth ventricle; Epithelium of choroid plexus; salivary gland; proximal tubule; More reference expression data
BioGPS	n/a
Gene ontology
Molecular function	oxidoreductase activity; L-aminoadipate-semialdehyde dehydrogenase activity; protein binding; betaine-aldehyde dehydrogenase activity; aldehyde dehydrogenase (NAD+) activity; oxidoreductase activity, acting on the aldehyde or oxo group of donors, NAD or NADP as acceptor; glyceraldehyde-3-phosphate dehydrogenase (NAD+) (non-phosphorylating) activity
Cellular component	mitochondrial matrix; extracellular exosome; mitochondrion; nucleus; cytoplasm; cytosol
Biological process	cellular aldehyde metabolic process; hearing; metabolism; glycine betaine biosynthetic process from choline; lysine catabolic process; choline catabolic process
Sources:Amigo / QuickGO
Orthologs
Databases	NCBI: entry; OMA: entry
Species	Human	Mouse
Entrez	501	110695
Ensembl	ENSG00000164904	ENSMUSG00000053644
UniProt	P49419	Q9DBF1
RefSeq (mRNA)	NM_001182; NM_001201377; NM_001202404	NM_001127338; NM_138600
RefSeq (protein)	NP_001173; NP_001188306; NP_001189333	NP_001120810; NP_613066
Location (UCSC)	Chr 5: 126.53 – 126.6 Mb	Chr 18: 56.64 – 56.71 Mb
PubMed search
- Wikidata
View/Edit Human	View/Edit Mouse

Aldehyde dehydrogenase 7 family, member A1, also known as ALDH7A1 or antiquitin, is an enzyme that in humans is encoded by the ALDH7A1 gene. The protein encoded by this gene is a member of subfamily 7 in the aldehyde dehydrogenase gene family. These enzymes are thought to play a major role in the detoxification of aldehydes generated by alcohol metabolism and lipid peroxidation. This particular member has homology to a previously described protein from the green garden pea, the 26g pea turgor protein. It is also involved in lysine catabolism that is known to occur in the mitochondrial matrix. Recent reports show that this protein is found both in the cytosol and the mitochondria, and the two forms likely arise from the use of alternative translation initiation sites. An additional variant encoding a different isoform has also been found for this gene. Mutations in this gene are associated with pyridoxine-dependent epilepsy. Several related pseudogenes have also been identified.

== Tissue distribution ==
Antiquitin localizes to different subcellular compartments depending on cellular context and physiological function. The protein can localize to the cytosol, mitochondria, or nucleus depending on the inclusion of specific localization sequences.

In particular, antiquitin localizes to the mitochondria in kidney and liver, where it contributes to the synthesis of betaine, a chaperone protein involved in protection against osmotic stress.

== Structure ==
The subcellular localization of antiquitin is determined by the presence or absence of specific targeting sequences in the encoded protein. The N-terminal mitochondrial targeting sequence mediates mitochondrial localization, whereas the nuclear localization signal and nuclear export signal regulate nuclear localization. Exclusion of these sequences results in cytosolic localization.

Two amino acid residues, Glu121 and Arg301, are critical for substrate binding and catalysis of alpha-aminoadipic semialdehyde (α-AASA).

Antiquitin shares 60% homology with the 26g pea turgor protein, also referred to as ALDH7B1, in the green garden pea.

== Function ==
As a member of subfamily 7 of the aldehyde dehydrogenase gene family, antiquitin performs NAD(P)+-dependent oxidation of aldehydes generated by alcohol metabolism, lipid peroxidation, and other forms of oxidative stress, converting them into their corresponding carboxylic acids.

Antiquitin also protects cells and tissues against osmotic stress, presumably through generation of osmolytes.

The protein may additionally contribute to protection of DNA during cell growth, as antiquitin expression is upregulated during the G1–S phase transition, a stage associated with elevated oxidative stress in the cell cycle.

Furthermore, antiquitin functions as the aldehyde dehydrogenase responsible for oxidation of α-AASA in the pipecolic acid pathway of lysine catabolism.

== Clinical significance ==
Mutations in this gene cause pyridoxine-dependent epilepsy, which involves a combination of various seizure types that do not respond to standard anticonvulsants, but are treatable via administration of pyridoxine hydrochloride. These pyridoxine-dependent seizures have been linked to the failure to oxidize α-AASA in patients due to mutated antiquitin. Additionally, antiquitin is implicated in other diseases, including cancer, diabetes, osteoporosis, premature ovarian failure and Huntington's disease, though the exact mechanisms remain unclear.

== Interactions ==
Antiquitin is known to interact with:

- Cyclin A.
