= HgcC family RNA =

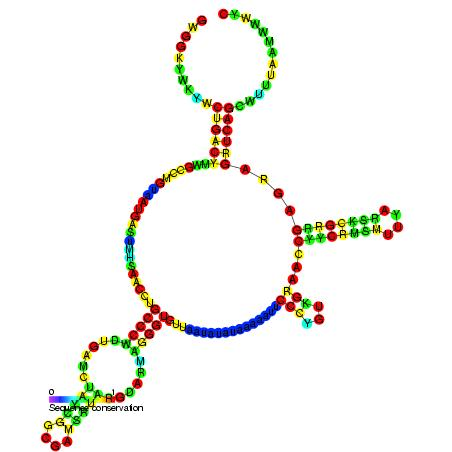
- Predicted secondary structure and sequence conservation of HgcC

Identifiers
- Symbol: HgcC
- Rfam: RF00062

Other data
- RNA type: Gene
- Domain(s): Archaea
- SO: SO:0000655
- PDB structures: PDBe

HgcC is a small non coding RNA (ncRNA). It is the functional product of a gene which is not translated into protein.

This ncRNA gene was originally identified by computationally searching the genome of the thermophilic archea Methanococcus jannaschii for non-coding regions of high guanine-cytosine (GC) content. The original rational for this search was based on the observation that the genomes of these bacteria are adenosine-thiamine (AT) rich and consequently have a low GC content. However, the GC content of ribosomal RNA (rRNA) and transfer RNA (tRNA) genes in hyperthermophiles shows a strong correlation with optimal growth temperature. It was proposed that non coding regions of high GC-content might encode functional RNA products. The computational screen identified a number of novel ncRNA genes in the genome of M.jannaschii. These were named hgc- ("high GC") A, B, C, D, E, F and G. Two other homologues were detected called HhcA and HhcB after "homologue of hgcC". A further RNA element, SscA RNA, was also identified.

The HgcC gene product was experimentally validated by Northern blot and RACE-PCR analysis. The function of this ncRNA is unknown.
