= Methanosarcina sRNAs =

sRNA162, sRNA154, sRNA41 are small non-coding RNA (sRNA) identified together with 248 other sRNA candidates by RNA sequencing in methanogenic archaeon Methanosarcina mazei Gö1. These sRNAs were further characterised. It was shown that sRNA162 can interact with both, a cis- and a trans-encoded mRNAs using two distinct domains. The sRNA overlaps the 5′UTR of the MM2442 mRNA and acts as a cis-encoded antisense RNA, and it also regulates MM2441 expression as a trans-encoded sRNA. It exhibits a regulatory role in the metabolic switch between methanol and trimethylamine as carbon and energy source. sRNA154, exclusively expressed under nitrogen deficiency, has a central regulatory role in nitrogen metabolism affecting nitrogenase and glutamine synthetase by masking the ribosome binding site or positively affecting transcript stability. sRNA41, highly expressed during nitrogen sufficiency, is capable to bind several ribosome binding sites independently within a polycistronic mRNA. It was proposed to inhibits translation initiation of all ACDS (acetyl-CoA decarbonylase/synthase complex) genes in N-dependent manner.

== See also ==
Bacterial sRNA involved in nitrogen metabolism: NsiR4

Other archaeal sRNAs:

- Pyrobaculum asR3 small RNA
- Archaeal H/ACA sRNA
