= 2-aminoadipate transaminase =

Class of enzymes

Identifiers
- EC no.: 2.6.1.39
- CAS no.: 9033-00-5

Databases
- IntEnz: IntEnz view
- BRENDA: BRENDA entry
- ExPASy: NiceZyme view
- KEGG: KEGG entry
- MetaCyc: metabolic pathway
- PRIAM: profile
- PDB structures: RCSB PDB PDBe PDBsum
- Gene Ontology: AmiGO / QuickGO
Search
- PMC: articles
- PubMed: articles
- NCBI: proteins

In enzymology, 2-aminoadipate transaminase (EC 2.6.1.39) is an enzyme that catalyzes the chemical reaction

L-2-aminoadipic acid
+
α-Ketoglutaric acid
2-Oxoadipic acid
+
L-Glutamic acid

The two substrates of this enzyme are L-2-aminoadipic acid and α-Ketoglutaric acid. Its products are 2-oxoadipic acid and L-glutamic acid.

This enzyme belongs to the family of transferases, specifically the transaminases, which transfer nitrogenous groups. The systematic name of this enzyme class is L-2-aminoadipate:2-oxoglutarate aminotransferase. Other names in common use include alpha-aminoadipate aminotransferase, 2-aminoadipate aminotransferase, 2-aminoadipic aminotransferase, glutamic-ketoadipic transaminase, and glutamate-alpha-ketoadipate transaminase. This enzyme participates in lysine biosynthesis and lysine degradation. It employs one cofactor, pyridoxal phosphate.

== Structural studies ==
As of late 2007, only one structure has been solved for this class of enzymes, with the PDB accession code 2DTV.
