= Pyrococcus chitonophagus =

Scientific classification
- Domain: Archaea
- Kingdom: Methanobacteriati
- Phylum: Methanobacteriota
- Class: Thermococci
- Order: Thermococcales
- Family: Thermococcaceae
- Genus: Pyrococcus
- Species: P. chitonophagus

Binomial name
- Pyrococcus chitonophagus Huber and Stetter 1996

Species of archaeon

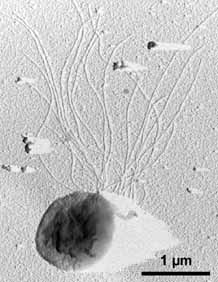
Pyrococcus/Thermococcus chitonophagus, K.O.Stetter & R.Rachel, Univ.Regensburg

Pyrococcus chitonophagus (Thermococcus chitonophagus pre-2016) is a chitin-degrading, hyperthermophilic archaeon isolated from a deep-sea hydrothermal vent. It is anaerobic, round to slightly irregular coccus-shaped, 1.2–2.5 μm in diameter, and motile by means of a tuft of flagella.

== History ==
In 1995, it was discovered off the West of the Mexican Coast 2,600m in the water. Since there was DNA–DNA hybridization, 16S rRNA, and the GC-content was 46.5%. Upon analysis, the chitonophagus was identified to be of the "Thermococcus" genus (see Thermococcus to Pyrococcus chitonophagus). Its thermophilic quality indicates it can survive in very extreme temperatures, also known as an extremophile. The importance is derived from it being the first nonrecombinant chitinase from archaea that was discovered.

== Characteristics ==
Pyrococcus chitonophagus is an archaeon, which is a single-celled organism, lacks cell nuclei, and reproduces asexually. As a member of Thermococci, it grows on organic substances, and have circular DNA. Thermococcales are often model organisms. All of the Thermococcales need sulfur and can ferment sugars for carbon. Organisms from this order are likely the first organisms to grow in some hydrothermal environments underwater. They are good at incorporating DNA from other species through homologous recombination.

=== Chitin Degradation ===
Three organisms have homologs to the chitin-degrading enzyme as hyperthermophilic archaea with genes which degrade chintin are rare. The chitinase was isolated and found to have a molecular weight of 70 kDa. Therefore, it has been named Chi70. It occurs in the outer membrane of the cell. Pyrococcus chitonophagus is the first archaeon to be found with Chi70, as when it was discovered, no matching homologous sequence was identified in the genetic analysis. It retains 50% of its activity after an hour at 120 °C. Chitin is the most abundant polysaccharide behind cellulose. The role of chitin in ecology of salty and hot water is relevant due to the abundance in the oceanic ecosystems, as shells of crustaceans are often chitin-based. Microorganisms such as bacteria and P. chitonophagus degrade it. Normally it is resistant to degradation because of its crystal structure. Glycosyl hydrolases, or GH, is the enzyme class that degrade polysaccharides such as chitin. The production and degradation of chitin must be balanced. Depending on the pH, temperature, and abundance of these organisms determines the chitin degradation rate. Since it is biodegradable because of organisms such as T. chitonophagus, has been employed in new nanotechnology, which involves polymer scaffold creation.

== Genome Analysis ==
The genome was sequenced via tools for sampling and purification. Cells were incubated, and GC content was found via mononucleoside and melting point analysis. DNA was hybridized and using chemiluminescence, was able to be pinpointed. Using PCR, (Polymerase chain reaction), the 16S rDNA was transformed and the product was identified and analysed against other RNA sequences.

=== Thermococcus to Pyrococcus chitonophagus ===
There are three genera in the Thermococcales order. Palaeococcus, Pyrococcus, and Τhermococcus, and most are organoheterotrophs. Pyrococcus chitonophagus is the new name for this archaeon. The entire genome was analysed and compared to other microorganisms' genomes, and was therefore proposed to belong to the genus Pyrococcus for the reason of similarities in the DNA. Pyrococcus can withstand a higher temperature, and from 95 °C up to 103 °C can be considered the best temperature for its development.
