= Saccharopine dehydrogenase (NAD+, L-glutamate-forming) =

saccharopine dehydrogenase (NAD+, L-glutamate-forming)

Identifiers
- EC no.: 1.5.1.9
- CAS no.: 37256-26-1

Databases
- IntEnz: IntEnz view
- BRENDA: BRENDA entry
- ExPASy: NiceZyme view
- KEGG: KEGG entry
- MetaCyc: metabolic pathway
- PRIAM: profile
- PDB structures: RCSB PDB PDBe PDBsum
- Gene Ontology: AmiGO / QuickGO
Search
- PMC: articles
- PubMed: articles
- NCBI: proteins

In enzymology, saccharopine dehydrogenase (NAD+, L-glutamate-forming) (EC 1.5.1.9) is an enzyme that catalyzes the chemical reaction

saccharopine
+ NAD^{+}
H_{2}O
H^{+}
H_{2}O
H^{+}
L-glutamic acid
+ NADH +
L-allysine

The three substrates of this enzyme are saccharopine, oxidised nicotinamide adenine dinucleotide (NAD^{+}), and water. Its products are L-glutamic acid, L-allysine, reduced NADH, and a proton.

This enzyme belongs to the family of oxidoreductases, specifically those acting on the CH-NH group of donors with NAD+ or NADP+ as acceptor. The systematic name of this enzyme class is N6-(L-1,3-dicarboxypropyl)-L-lysine:NAD+ oxidoreductase (L-glutamate-forming). Other names in common use include dehydrogenase, saccharopine (nicotinamide adenine dinucleotide,, glutamate-forming), saccharopin dehydrogenase, NAD+ oxidoreductase (L-2-aminoadipic-delta-semialdehyde and, glutamate forming), aminoadipic semialdehyde synthase, saccharopine dehydrogenase (NAD+, L-glutamate-forming), 6-N-(L-1,3-dicarboxypropyl)-L-lysine:NAD+ oxidoreductase, and (L-glutamate-forming). This enzyme participates in lysine degradation.
