= L-aminoadipate-semialdehyde dehydrogenase =

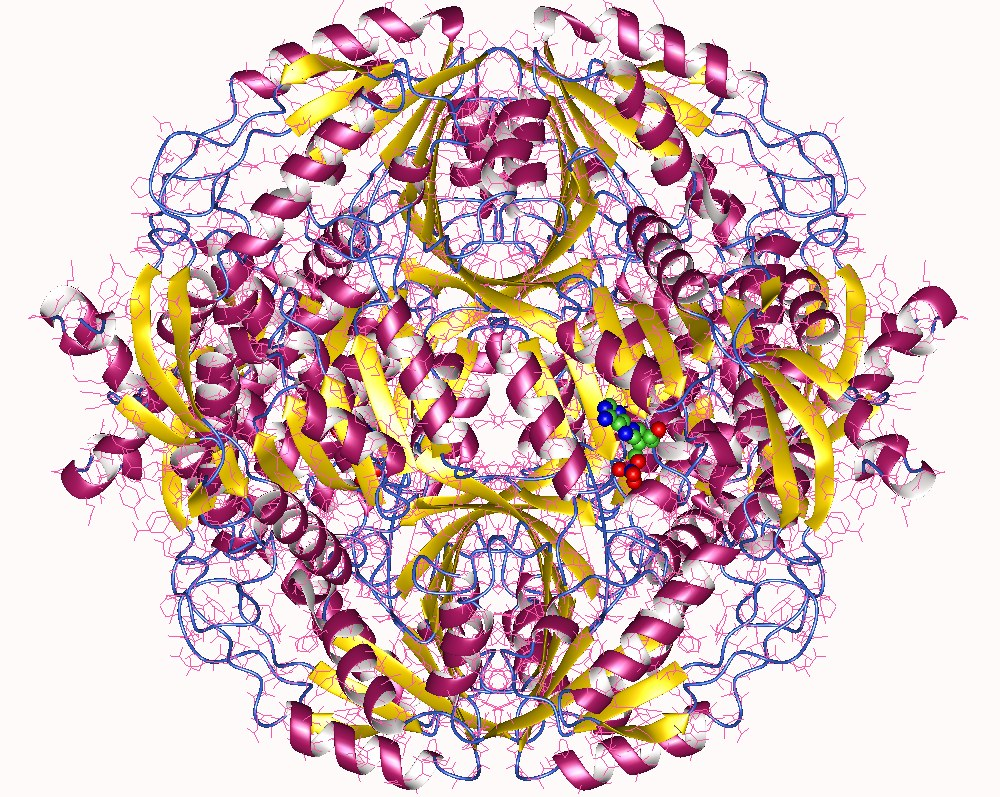
- Alpha-aminoadipic semialdehyde dehydrogenase tetramer, Human

Identifiers
- EC no.: 1.2.1.31
- CAS no.: 9067-87-2

Databases
- IntEnz: IntEnz view
- BRENDA: BRENDA entry
- ExPASy: NiceZyme view
- KEGG: KEGG entry
- MetaCyc: metabolic pathway
- PRIAM: profile
- PDB structures: RCSB PDB PDBe PDBsum
- Gene Ontology: AmiGO / QuickGO
Search
- PMC: articles
- PubMed: articles
- NCBI: proteins

In enzymology, a L-aminoadipate-semialdehyde dehydrogenase (EC 1.2.1.31) is an enzyme that catalyzes the chemical reaction

L-allysine
+ NAD^{+}
H_{2}O
H^{+}
H_{2}O
H^{+}
(S)-2-aminoadipic acid
+ NADH

The three substrates of this enzyme are L-2-aminoadipate 6-semialdehyde (L-allysine), oxidised nicotinamide adenine dinucleotide (NAD^{+}), and water. Its products are (S)-α-aminoadipic acid, reduced NADH, and a proton. This enzyme can also use nicotinamide adenine dinucleotide phosphate as its cofactor.

The enzyme participates in lysine biosynthesis and biodegradation.

== Nomenclature ==
This enzyme belongs to the family of oxidoreductases, specifically those acting on the aldehyde or oxo group of donor with NAD+ or NADP+ as acceptor. The systematic name of this enzyme class is L-2-aminoadipate-6-semialdehyde:NAD(P)+ 6-oxidoreductase. Other names in common use include:

- aminoadipate semialdehyde dehydrogenase,
- 2-aminoadipate semialdehyde dehydrogenase,
- alpha-aminoadipate-semialdehyde dehydrogenase,
- alpha-aminoadipate reductase,
- 2-aminoadipic semialdehyde dehydrogenase,
- L-alpha-aminoadipate delta-semialdehyde oxidoreductase,
- L-alpha-aminoadipate delta-semialdehyde:NAD+ oxidoreductase,
- L-alpha-aminoadipate delta-semialdehyde:nicotinamide adenine,
- and dinucleotide oxidoreductase.
