= Homoisocitric acid =

Names
- Preferred IUPAC name 1-Hydroxybutane-1,2,4-tricarboxylic acid
- Other names 3-Carboxy-2-hydroxyadipic acid

Identifiers
CAS Number	3562-75-2
3D model (JSmol)	Interactive image
ChEBI	CHEBI:29094
ChemSpider	4293958
KEGG	C05662
PubChem CID	5119182
UNII	KY8XK8CT7R
CompTox Dashboard (EPA)	DTXSID80956995
- InChI: InChI=1S/C7H10O7/c8-4(9)2-1-3(6(11)12)5(10)7(13)14/h3,5,10H,1-2H2,(H,8,9)(H,11,12)(H,13,14) Key: OEJZZCGRGVFWHK-UHFFFAOYSA-N; InChI=1/C7H10O7/c8-4(9)2-1-3(6(11)12)5(10)7(13)14/h3,5,10H,1-2H2,(H,8,9)(H,11,12)(H,13,14) Key: OEJZZCGRGVFWHK-UHFFFAOYAM
- SMILES: O=C(O)CCC(C(=O)O)C(O)C(=O)O

Properties
Chemical formula	C_{7}H_{10}O_{7}
Molar mass	206.150 g·mol^{−1}
- Except where otherwise noted, data are given for materials in their standard state (at 25 °C [77 °F], 100 kPa). Infobox references

Homoisocitric acid, with the systematic name 1-hydroxy-1,2,4-butanetricarboxylic acid is a positional isomer of homocitric acid, which is 2-hydroxy-1,2,4-butanetricarboxylic acid. The stereoisomer found in nature, the (1R,2S) form, is an intermediate in the α-aminoadipate pathway of lysine biosynthesis where it is produced by homocitrate synthase:

α-Ketoglutaric acid
+ acetyl-CoA
H_{2}O
H_{2}O
(-)-Homoisocitric acid
+ Coenzyme A

It is a substrate for homoaconitate hydratase.

(-)-Homoisocitric acid
H_{2}O
H_{2}O
cis-Homoaconitic acid

The compound is also acted on by homoisocitrate dehydrogenase to give 2-oxoadipic acid:

(-)-Homoisocitric acid
+ NAD^{+}
H^{+}
H^{+}
2-Oxoadipic acid
+ CO_{2} + NADH

Homoisocitrate is an anion, salt, or ester of homoisocitric acid.
