= Saccharopine dehydrogenase (NADP+, L-lysine-forming) =

saccharopine dehydrogenase (NADP+, L-lysine-forming)

Identifiers
- EC no.: 1.5.1.8
- CAS no.: 9031-19-0

Databases
- IntEnz: IntEnz view
- BRENDA: BRENDA entry
- ExPASy: NiceZyme view
- KEGG: KEGG entry
- MetaCyc: metabolic pathway
- PRIAM: profile
- PDB structures: RCSB PDB PDBe PDBsum
- Gene Ontology: AmiGO / QuickGO
Search
- PMC: articles
- PubMed: articles
- NCBI: proteins

In enzymology, saccharopine dehydrogenase (NADP+, L-lysine-forming) (EC 1.5.1.8) is an enzyme that catalyzes the chemical reaction

Saccharopine
+ NADP^{+}
H_{2}O
H^{+}
H_{2}O
H^{+}
L-lysine
+ NADPH +
α-Ketoglutaric acid

The three substrates of this enzyme are saccharopine, oxidised nicotinamide adenine dinucleotide phosphate (NADP^{+}), and water. Its products are L-lysine, α-ketoglutaric acid, reduced NADPH, and a proton.

This enzyme belongs to the family of oxidoreductases, specifically those acting on the CH-NH group of donors with NAD+ or NADP+ as acceptor. The systematic name of this enzyme class is N6-(L-1,3-dicarboxypropyl)-L-lysine:NADP+ oxidoreductase (L-lysine-forming). Other names in common use include lysine-2-oxoglutarate reductase, lysine-ketoglutarate reductase, L-lysine-alpha-ketoglutarate reductase, lysine:alpha-ketoglutarate:TPNH oxidoreductase, (epsilon-N-[gultaryl-2]-L-lysine forming), saccharopine (nicotinamide adenine dinucleotide phosphate,, lysine-forming) dehydrogenase, 6-N-(L-1,3-dicarboxypropyl)-L-lysine:NADP+ oxidoreductase, and (L-lysine-forming). This enzyme participates in lysine biosynthesis and lysine degradation.
