= Homocitrate synthase =

Enzyme

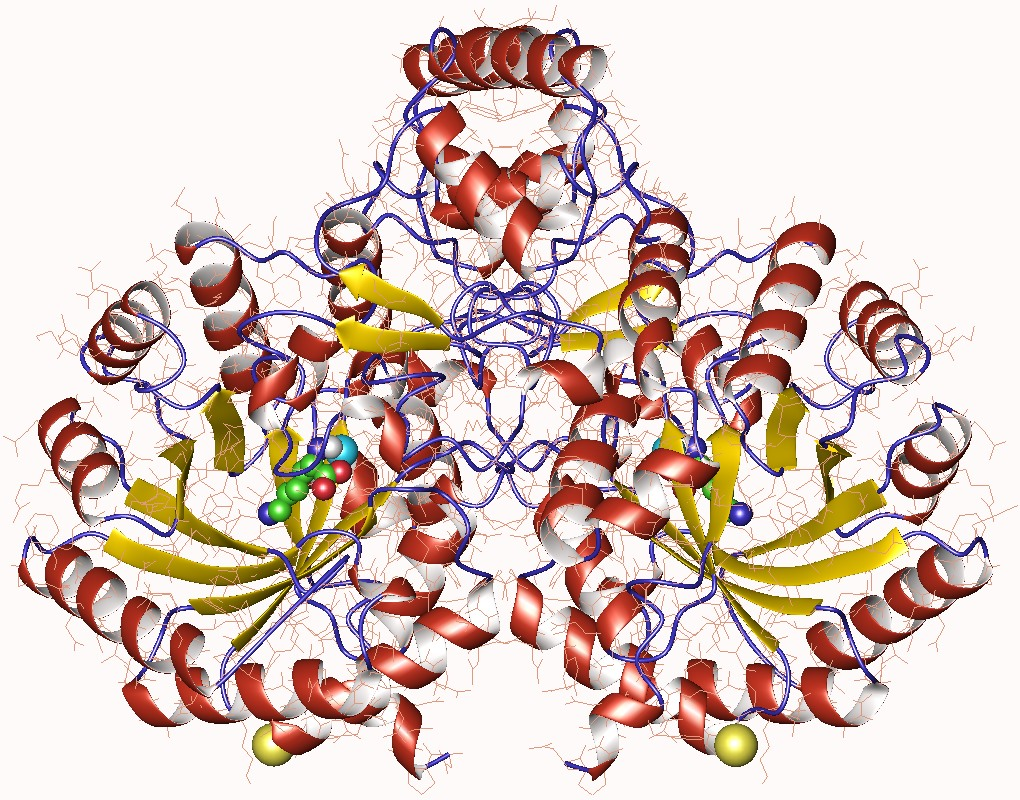
- Homocitrate synthase homodimer, Schizosaccharomyces pombe

Identifiers
- EC no.: 2.3.3.14
- CAS no.: 9075-60-9

Databases
- IntEnz: IntEnz view
- BRENDA: BRENDA entry
- ExPASy: NiceZyme view
- KEGG: KEGG entry
- MetaCyc: metabolic pathway
- PRIAM: profile
- PDB structures: RCSB PDB PDBe PDBsum
- Gene Ontology: AmiGO / QuickGO
Search
- PMC: articles
- PubMed: articles
- NCBI: proteins

Homocitrate synthase (EC 2.3.3.14) is an enzyme that catalyzes the chemical reaction

α-Ketoglutaric acid
Acetyl-CoA
H_{2}O
H_{2}O
(-)-Homoisocitric acid
+ Coenzyme A

The three substrates of this enzyme are α-ketoglutaric acid, acetyl-CoA, and water. Its products are the (-) enantiomer of homoisocitric acid and coenzyme A.

This enzyme belongs to the family of transferases, specifically those acyltransferases that convert acyl groups into alkyl groups on transfer. The systematic name of this enzyme class is acetyl-CoA:2-oxoglutarate C-acetyltransferase (thioester-hydrolysing, carboxymethyl forming). Other names in common use include 2-hydroxybutane-1,2,4-tricarboxylate 2-oxoglutarate-lyase, (CoA-acetylating), acetyl-coenzyme A:2-ketoglutarate C-acetyl transferase, and homocitrate synthetase. This enzyme participates in lysine biosynthesis and pyruvate metabolism.
