= Methanogen homoaconitase =

Identifiers
- EC no.: 4.2.1.114

Databases
- IntEnz: IntEnz view
- BRENDA: BRENDA entry
- ExPASy: NiceZyme view
- KEGG: KEGG entry
- MetaCyc: metabolic pathway
- PRIAM: profile
- PDB structures: RCSB PDB PDBe PDBsum
Search
- PMC: articles
- PubMed: articles
- NCBI: proteins

Methanogen homoaconitase (EC 4.2.1.114, methanogen HACN) is an enzyme with systematic name (R)-2-hydroxybutane-1,2,4-tricarboxylate hydro-lyase ((1R,2S)-1-hydroxybutane-1,2,4-tricarboxylate-forming). This enzyme catalyses the following chemical reaction

(R)-2-hydroxybutane-1,2,4-tricarboxylate $\rightleftharpoons$ (1R,2S)-1-hydroxybutane-1,2,4-tricarboxylate (overall reaction)

(1a) (R)-2-hydroxybutane-1,2,4-tricarboxylate $\rightleftharpoons$ (Z)-but-1-ene-1,2,4-tricarboxylate + H_{2}O
(1b) (Z)-but-1-ene-1,2,4-tricarboxylate + H_{2}O $\rightleftharpoons$ (1R,2S)-1-hydroxybutane-1,2,4-tricarboxylate

This enzyme catalyses several reactions in the pathway of coenzyme-B biosynthesis in methanogenic archaea.
