= Saccharopine dehydrogenase (NADP+, L-glutamate-forming) =

saccharopine dehydrogenase (NADP+, L-glutamate-forming)
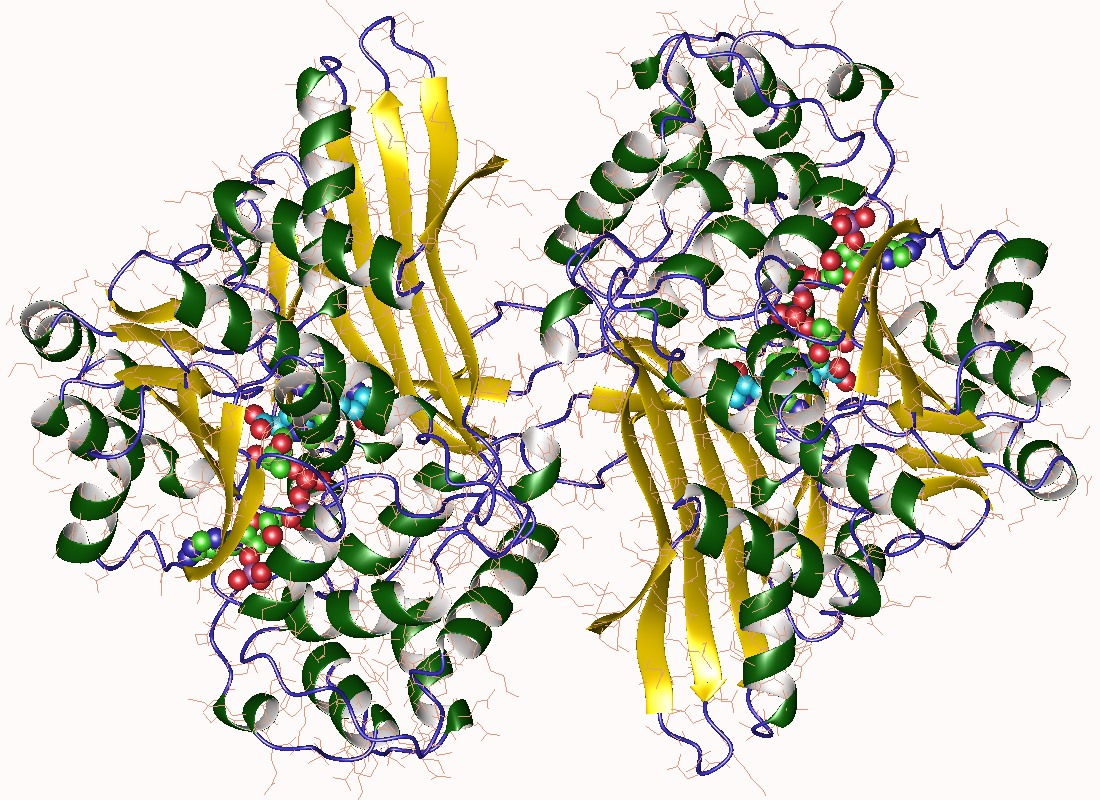
- Saccharopine dehydrogenase (NADP+, L-glutamate-forming) homodimer, Pyricularia grisea

Identifiers
- EC no.: 1.5.1.10
- CAS no.: 9033-55-0

Databases
- IntEnz: IntEnz view
- BRENDA: BRENDA entry
- ExPASy: NiceZyme view
- KEGG: KEGG entry
- MetaCyc: metabolic pathway
- PRIAM: profile
- PDB structures: RCSB PDB PDBe PDBsum
- Gene Ontology: AmiGO / QuickGO
Search
- PMC: articles
- PubMed: articles
- NCBI: proteins

In enzymology, a saccharopine dehydrogenase (NADP+, L-glutamate-forming) (EC 1.5.1.10) is an enzyme that catalyzes the chemical reaction

saccharopine
+ NADP^{+}
H_{2}O
H^{+}
H_{2}O
H^{+}
L-glutamic acid
+ NADPH +
L-allysine

The three substrates of this enzyme are saccharopine, oxidised nicotinamide adenine dinucleotide phosphate (NADP^{+}), and water. Its products are L-glutamic acid, L-allysine, reduced NADPH, and a proton.

This enzyme belongs to the family of oxidoreductases, specifically those acting on the CH-NH group of donors with NAD+ or NADP+ as acceptor. The systematic name of this enzyme class is N6-(L-1,3-dicarboxypropyl)-L-lysine:NADP+ oxidoreductase (L-glutamate-forming). Other names in common use include saccharopine (nicotinamide adenine dinucleotide phosphate,, glutamate-forming) dehydrogenase, aminoadipic semialdehyde-glutamic reductase, aminoadipate semialdehyde-glutamate reductase, aminoadipic semialdehyde-glutamate reductase, epsilon-N-(L-glutaryl-2)-L-lysine:NAD+(P) oxidoreductase, (L-2-aminoadipate-semialdehyde forming), saccharopine reductase, 6-N-(L-1,3-dicarboxypropyl)-L-lysine:NADP+ oxidoreductase, and (L-glutamate-forming). This enzyme participates in lysine biosynthesis and lysine degradation.

== Structural studies ==
As of late 2007, 3 structures have been solved for this class of enzymes, with PDB accession codes 1E5L, 1E5Q, and 2AXQ.
