= Homoisocitrate dehydrogenase =

Enzyme

homoisocitrate dehydrogenase
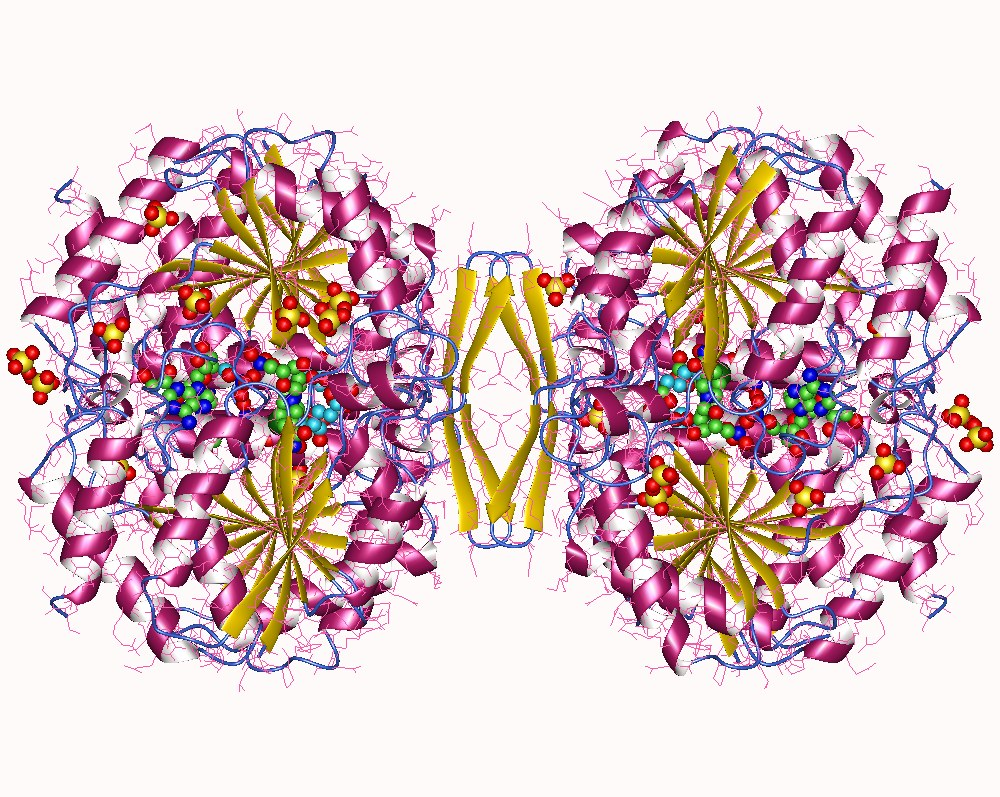
- Homoisocitrate dehydrogenase tetramer, Thermus thermophilus

Identifiers
- EC no.: 1.1.1.87
- CAS no.: 37250-23-0

Databases
- IntEnz: IntEnz view
- BRENDA: BRENDA entry
- ExPASy: NiceZyme view
- KEGG: KEGG entry
- MetaCyc: metabolic pathway
- PRIAM: profile
- PDB structures: RCSB PDB PDBe PDBsum
- Gene Ontology: AmiGO / QuickGO
Search
- PMC: articles
- PubMed: articles
- NCBI: proteins

In enzymology, homoisocitrate dehydrogenase (EC 1.1.1.87) is an enzyme that catalyzes the chemical reaction

(-)-Homoisocitric acid
+ NAD^{+}
H^{+}
H^{+}
2-Oxoadipic acid
+ CO_{2} + NADH

The two substrates of this enzyme are (-)-homoisocitric acid and oxidised nicotinamide adenine dinucleotide (NAD^{+}). Its products are 2-oxoadipic acid, carbon dioxide, reduced NADH, and a proton.

This enzyme belongs to the family of oxidoreductases, specifically those acting on the CH-OH group of donor with NAD^{+} or NADP^{+} as acceptor. The systematic name of this enzyme class is (1R,2S)-1-hydroxybutane-1,2,4-tricarboxylate:NAD^{+} oxidoreductase (decarboxylating). Other names in common use include 2-hydroxy-3-carboxyadipate dehydrogenase, 3-carboxy-2-hydroxyadipate dehydrogenase, homoisocitric dehydrogenase, (−)-1-hydroxy-1,2,4-butanetricarboxylate:NAD^{+} oxidoreductase, (decarboxylating), 3-carboxy-2-hydroxyadipate:NAD^{+} oxidoreductase (decarboxylating), and HICDH. This enzyme participates in lysine biosynthesis.

== Structural studies ==
As of late 2007, only one structure has been solved for this class of enzymes, with the PDB accession code 1X0L.
