= Homoaconitate hydratase =

Enzyme

homoaconitate hydratase
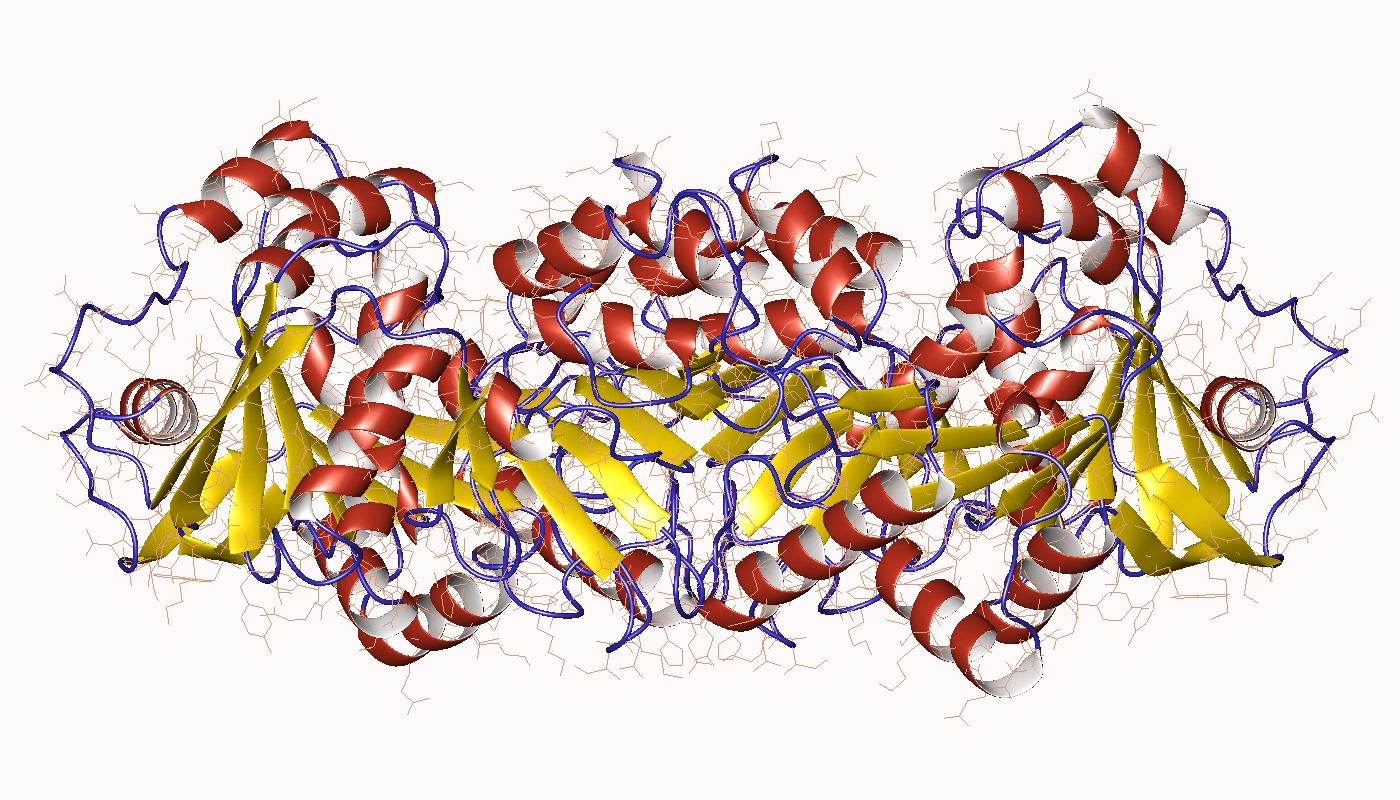
- Homoaconitate hydratase homodimer, Methanocaldococcus jannaschii

Identifiers
- EC no.: 4.2.1.36
- CAS no.: 9030-68-6

Databases
- IntEnz: IntEnz view
- BRENDA: BRENDA entry
- ExPASy: NiceZyme view
- KEGG: KEGG entry
- MetaCyc: metabolic pathway
- PRIAM: profile
- PDB structures: RCSB PDB PDBe PDBsum
- Gene Ontology: AmiGO / QuickGO
Search
- PMC: articles
- PubMed: articles
- NCBI: proteins

The enzyme homoaconitate hydratase (EC 4.2.1.36) catalyzes the chemical reaction:

(-)-Homoisocitric acid
H_{2}O
H_{2}O
cis-Homoaconitic acid

This enzyme belongs to the family of lyases, specifically the hydro-lyases, which cleave carbon-oxygen bonds. The systematic name of this enzyme class is (1R,2S)-1-hydroxybutane-1,2,4-tricarboxylate hydro-lyase [(Z)-but-1-ene-1,2,4-tricarboxylate-forming]. Other names in common use include homoaconitase, cis-homoaconitase, HACN, Lys4, LysF, and 2-hydroxybutane-1,2,4-tricarboxylate hydro-lyase (incorrect). This enzyme participates in lysine biosynthesis.
