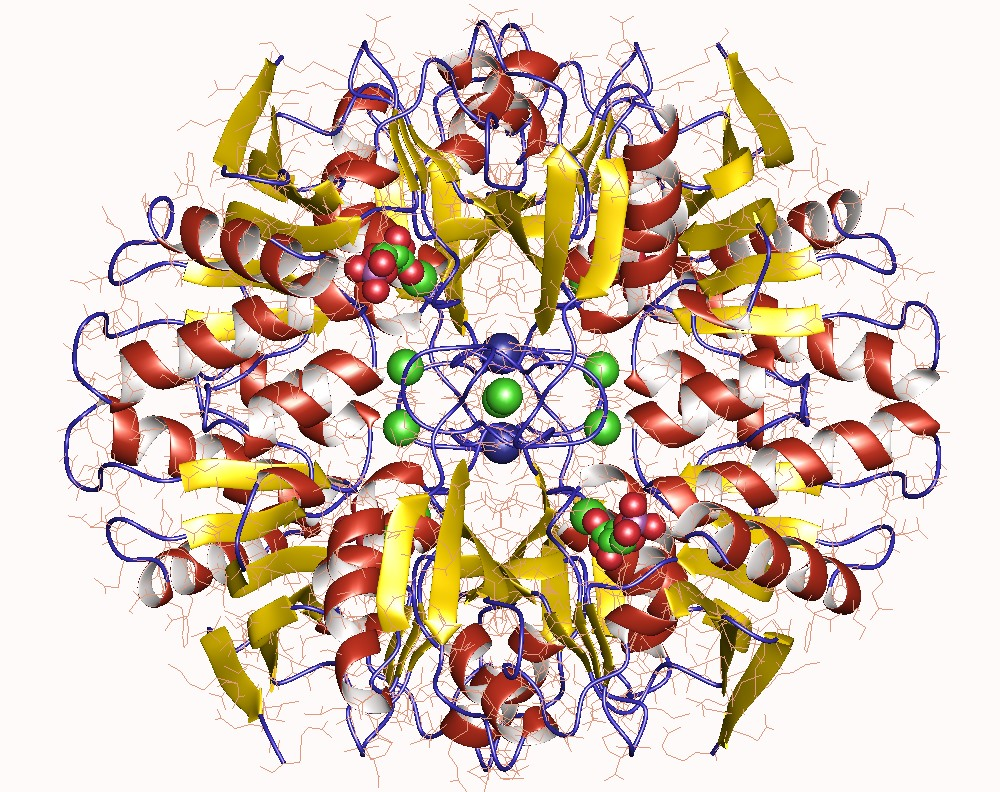

Scientific classification
- Domain: Archaea
- Kingdom: Methanobacteriati
- Phylum: Methanobacteriota
- Class: Thermococci
- Order: Thermococcales
- Family: Thermococcaceae
- Genus: Pyrococcus
- Species: P. horikoshii

Binomial name
- Pyrococcus horikoshii Erauso et al. 1993

= Pyrococcus horikoshii =

Species of archaeon

Pyrococcus horikoshii is a hyperthermophilic, anaerobic archaeon, first isolated from hydrothermal fluid samples obtained at the Okinawa Trough vents at a depth of 1,395 metres (4,577 ft). It is obligately heterotrophic, cells are irregular cocci with a tuft of flagella, growing optimally at 98 °C, sulphur greatly enhancing its growth.
