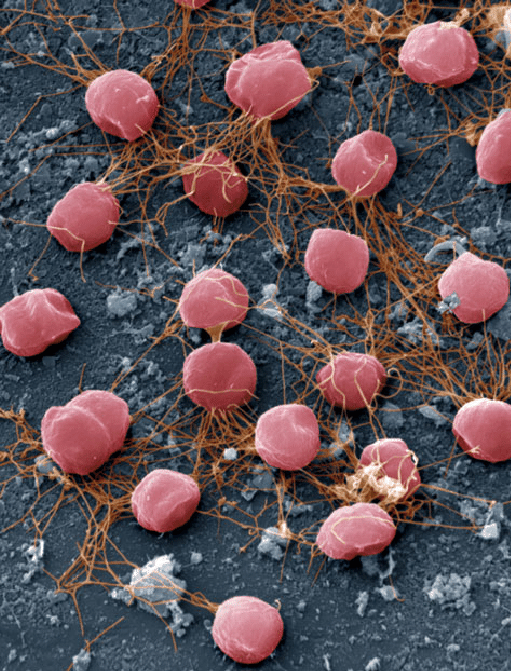
- Pyrococcus furiosus

Scientific classification
- Domain: Archaea
- Kingdom: Methanobacteriati
- Phylum: Methanobacteriota
- Class: Thermococci
- Order: Thermococcales
- Family: Thermococcaceae
- Genus: Pyrococcus; Fiala and Stetter 1986

Type species
- Pyrococcus furiosus Fiala and Stetter 1986

Species
- "P. abyssi"; "P. chitonophagus"; "P. endeavori"; P. furiosus; P. glycovorans; P. horikoshii; P. kukulkanii; P. yayanosii

= Pyrococcus =

Genus of archaea

Pyrococcus is a genus of Thermococcaceaen archaeans.

== Description and significance ==
Pyrococcus has similar characteristics of other thermoautotrophican archaea such as Archaeoglobus, and Methanococcus in the respect that they are all thermophilic and anaerobic. Pyrococcus differs, however, because its optimal growth temperature is nearly 100 °C and dwells at a greater sea depth than the other archaea. Studying Pyrococcus helps give insight to possible mechanisms used to endure extreme environmental conditions like high temperatures and high pressure.

== Phylogeny ==
The currently accepted taxonomy is based on the List of Prokaryotic names with Standing in Nomenclature (LPSN) and National Center for Biotechnology Information (NCBI).

16S rRNA based LTP_07_2026

- Pyrococcus
  - - P. horikoshii Gonzlez et al. 1999
    - - P. furiosus Fiala & Stetter 1986
      - P. woesei Zillig et al. 1988
  - - P. yayanosii Birrien et al. 2011
    - - P. kukulkanii Callac et al. 2016
      - - "P. chitonophagus" (Huber & Stetter 1996) Lepage et al. 2004
        - P. glycovorans Barbier et al. 1999

53 marker proteins based GTDB 11-RS232

- Pyrococcus
  - P. yayanosii
  - - P. furiosus [incl. P. woesei]
    - - - "P. abyssi" Erauso et al. 1993
        - P. horikoshii
      - - P. kukulkanii
        - "P. chitonophagus"

== Genome structure ==
Three of the Pyrococcus species have been sequenced. P. furiosus is the largest containing 1.9 Mb followed by P. abyssi with 1.8 Mb and P. horikoshii with 1.7 Mb. The genomes encode for many different metabolic enzymes which gives themselves a wider spectrum of living conditions because they can transport and metabolize a wide range of organic substances. Variation was detected between species as well.

== Cell structure and metabolism ==
The cells of Pyrococcus are about 0.8–2 μm and are slightly irregular cocci in shape. They show a polar grouping of flagella and are enveloped by an S-layer enclosing a periplasmic space around the cytoplasmic membrane. Pyrococcus species are anaerobic but vary slightly concerning their metabolism. Peptide fermentation is the principle metabolic pathway; however, growth has been observed for P. furiosus and P. abyssi on starch, maltose, and pyruvate, but not for P. horikoshii. While the presence of elemental sulfur is not needed for growth, growth is enhanced with the addition of S^{o}.

== Ecology ==
Pyrococcus species inhabit environments with extremely high temperatures such as hydrothermal vents. Optimal growth conditions include a pH level of about 7, a salt concentration around 2.5% (25 g/L), and a temperature around 98 °C. Growing in temperatures this high, it is easy to see why they are anaerobic since at these boiling temperatures hardly any oxygen will be available. In the example of Hydrothermal vents, where P. abyssi has been found, there is no sunlight and the pressure is around 200 atm in addition to the extremely high temperature.

== See also ==
- List of Archaea genera
