= Archaeal H/ACA sRNA =

In archaea like in eukaryotes, uridines in various RNAs are converted to pseudouridines by ribonucleoprotein complexes (RNPs) containing H/ACA sRNA. Because of their conserved function, these sRNAs are also called small "nucleolar" RNAs (snoRNA) like in eukaryotes, despite no nucleus is present in prokaryotes. By using various computational and experimental approaches in three Pyrococcus genomes seven H/ACA sRNAs and 15 pseudouridine (Ψ) resides on rRNA were identified. One H/ACA motif was shown to guide up to three distinct pseudouridylations. Atypical pseudouridine guide RNA features were identified in Pyrobaculum species. Lack of the conserved 3'-terminal ACA sequence and sometimes lack of 5' portion of the pseudouridylation pocket feature in few conserved Pyrobaculum H/ACA-like sRNAs. A study by Toffano-Nioche et al. proposes an unified structure/function model based on the common structural components in "Euryarchaeota" and Thermoproteota (formerly Crenarchaeota) shared by H/ACA and H/ACA-like motifs .

== See also ==
Other archaeal sRNAs:

- Pyrobaculum asR3 small RNA
- Methanosarcina sRNA162
