= 2-Oxoadipic acid =

Skeletal formula of α-ketoadipic acid
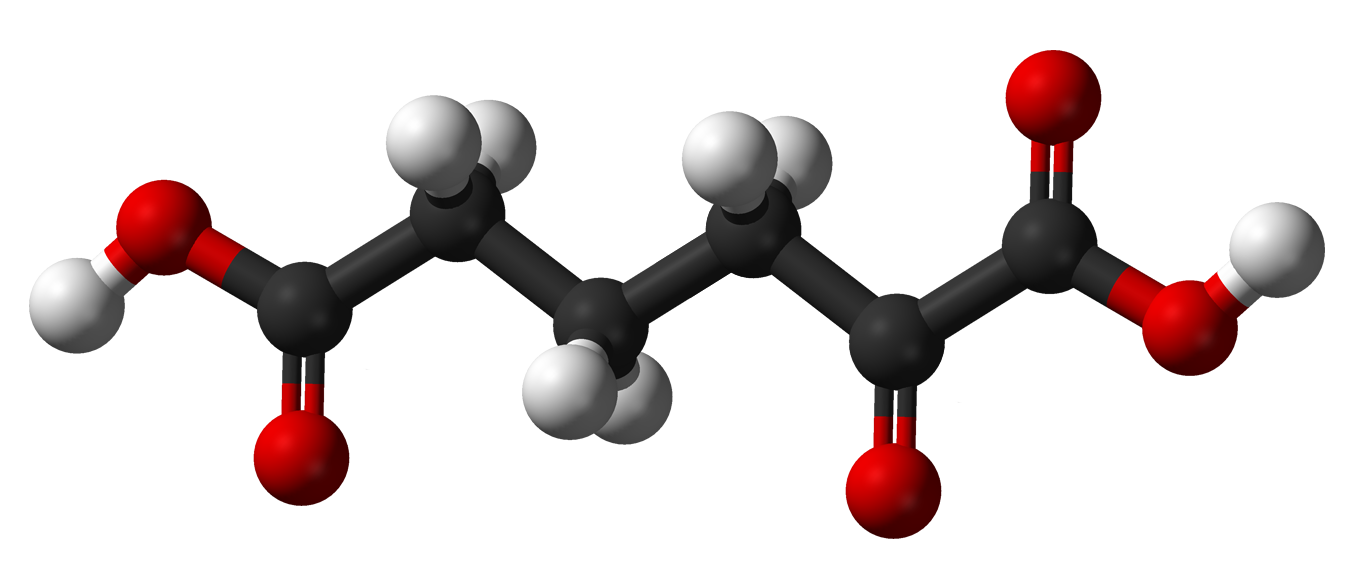
Ball and stick model of α-ketoadipic acid

Names
- Preferred IUPAC name 2-Oxohexanedioic acid
- Other names α-Ketoadipic acid 2-Ketoadipic acid α-Oxoadipic acid

Identifiers
CAS Number	3184-35-8
3D model (JSmol)	Interactive image; Interactive image
ChEBI	CHEBI:15753
ChemSpider	70
ECHA InfoCard	100.164.320
IUPHAR/BPS	4657
KEGG	C00322
MeSH	Alpha-ketoadipic+acid
PubChem CID	71
UNII	BB72FKL1M2
CompTox Dashboard (EPA)	DTXSID20185702
- InChI: InChI=1S/C6H8O5/c7-4(6(10)11)2-1-3-5(8)9/h1-3H2,(H,8,9)(H,10,11) Key: FGSBNBBHOZHUBO-UHFFFAOYSA-N; InChI=1/C6H8O5/c7-4(6(10)11)2-1-3-5(8)9/h1-3H2,(H,8,9)(H,10,11) Key: FGSBNBBHOZHUBO-UHFFFAOYAU
- SMILES: C(CC(=O)C(=O)O)CC(=O)O; O=C(C(=O)O)CCCC(=O)O

Properties
Chemical formula	C_{6}H_{8}O_{5}
Molar mass	160.125 g·mol^{−1}
Density	1.4 g cm^{−3}
Melting point	125 °C (257 °F; 398 K)
- Except where otherwise noted, data are given for materials in their standard state (at 25 °C [77 °F], 100 kPa). verify (what is ?) Infobox references

2-Oxoadipic acid, also known as α-ketoadipic acid, is an intermediate in the metabolism of lysine and tryptophan. The conjugate base and carboxylate is 2-oxoadipate or α-ketoadipate, which is the biochemically relevant form. Glutaric acid is naturally produced by chain extension of α-ketoglutarate to 2-oxoadipic acid.

== See also ==
- Homoisocitrate dehydrogenase
- 2-oxoadipate dehydrogenase complex (OADHC)
