= Homocitric acid =

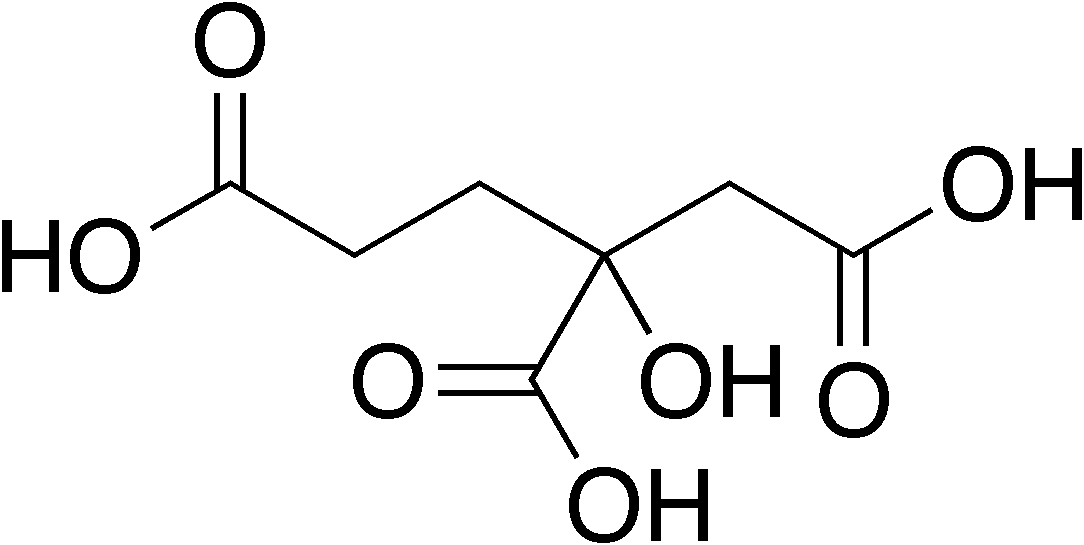

Names
- Preferred IUPAC name 2-Hydroxybutane-1,2,4-tricarboxylic acid
- Other names Homocitric acid Homocitrate

Identifiers
CAS Number	3562-74-1
3D model (JSmol)	Interactive image
ChEBI	CHEBI:17852
ChemSpider	26392
KEGG	C01251
PubChem CID	28371
UNII	5883XD8HH4
CompTox Dashboard (EPA)	DTXSID10331413
- InChI: InChI=1S/C7H10O7/c8-4(9)1-2-7(14,6(12)13)3-5(10)11/h14H,1-3H2,(H,8,9)(H,10,11)(H,12,13) Key: XKJVEVRQMLKSMO-UHFFFAOYSA-N; InChI=1/C7H10O7/c8-4(9)1-2-7(14,6(12)13)3-5(10)11/h14H,1-3H2,(H,8,9)(H,10,11)(H,12,13) Key: XKJVEVRQMLKSMO-UHFFFAOYAL
- SMILES: O=C(O)CC(O)(C(=O)O)CCC(=O)O

Properties
Chemical formula	C_{7}H_{10}O_{7}
Molar mass	206.150 g·mol^{−1}
Appearance	Colorless solid
- Except where otherwise noted, data are given for materials in their standard state (at 25 °C [77 °F], 100 kPa). verify (what is ?) Infobox references

Homocitric acid is an organic compound with the formula HOC(CO_{2}H)(CH_{2}CO_{2}H)(C_{2}H_{4}CO_{2}H). This tricarboxylic acid occurs naturally as a component of the iron-molybdenum cofactor of certain nitrogenase proteins. Biochemists often refer to this cofactor as homocitrate, which is the conjugate bases that predominate in neutral aqueous solutions of this species.

The molecule is related to citric acid by the addition of one methylene unit, hence the prefix "homo." Unlike citric acid, homocitric acid is chiral. The acid exists in equilibrium with the lactone.

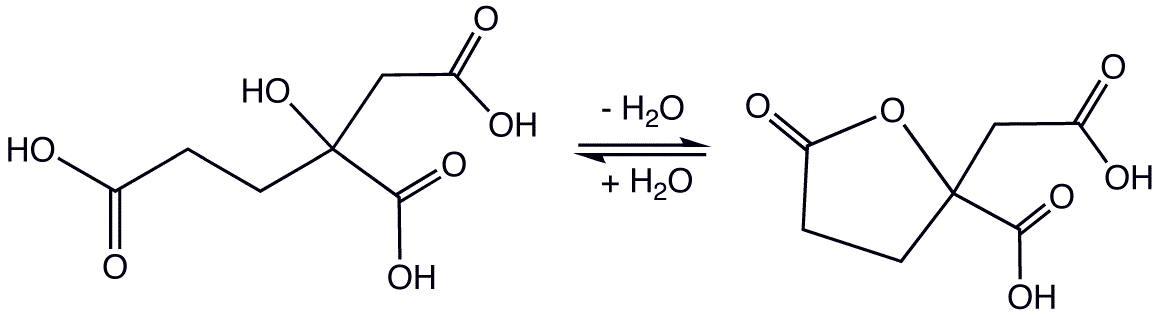

== See also ==
- Homoisocitric acid
