= Taosheng Huang =

American geneticist and physician scientist

- Born: Huang Taosheng; December 20, 1961 (age 64); Fujian Province, China
- Education: Fujian Medical University (M.D., 1983); Icahn School of Medicine at Mount Sinai (Ph.D. Degree, 1991)
- Scientific career
- Fields: Genetics Molecular Biology
- Workplaces: Icahn School of Medicine at Mount Sinai; American Red Cross; Georgetown University; Harvard Medical School; University of California, Irvine School of Medicine; Cincinnati Children's Hospital

Taosheng Huang is a physician-scientist with substantial academic achievements and professional experience in translational research, specifically, in human mitochondrial genetics. He is a full Professor and Director of the Molecular Diagnostic Laboratory in the Division of Human Genetics at Cincinnati Children's Hospital Medical Center (CCHMC). Huang has published over 100 manuscripts in many impactful journals.

== Career ==
Upon becoming an independent principal research investigator at the University of California, Irvine in 2001, he started to explore the molecular basis of genetic syndromes. Upon applying the knowledge gained from these discoveries, he was the very first to establish the link between TBX3 and cancer.

== Research and discoveries ==
Huang has contributed towards basic science and clinical research in human genetics and genetic syndromes, particularly in mitochondrial disorders. Upon becoming an independent investigator after moving to University of California, Irvine in 2001, he worked on TBX3 and its relationship with breast cancer, the genetics of optic atrophy and other mitochondrial diseases. His laboratory developed a Drosophila model to develop a therapy for genetic disease and became the very first group to link TBX3 to cancer. During his tenure at UC Irvine, he served as the director of the Clinical laboratory improvement amendments (CLIA)-certified MitoMed Molecular Diagnostics Laboratory, which focused on the molecular basis of mitochondrial disease and the identification mutations in the mitochondrial genome. As Director of the Molecular Diagnostic lab at Cincinnati Children's Hospital Medical Center, Huang is currently interested in identifying disease-causing genes and their molecular mechanisms. His group has identified many novel genes that are linked with human diseases, and has used induced pluripotent stem cell models and CRISPR/Cas9-produced mouse models in his lab to explore the pathogenesis of mutations in those specific genes. His research on mitochondrial replacement therapy undertaken in collaboration with John Zhang led to the "three parent baby" which was ranked among the top 10 science stories in 2016 by Science News and Nature.

== Recent Research Work and Notable Discoveries ==
=== Discovery of novel disease-causing genes ===
Huang's group has identified and published seven novel genes in the past 5 years that are associated with human diseases. The relevant genes and their associated disorders include SLC25A46 (Abrams et al, Nat Genet, 2016) and FDXR (Peng et al HMG, 2017) in optic atrophy and peripheral neuropathy, NARS2 in Leigh syndrome (Simon et al, PLOS Genet, 2015), NAA10 in Lenz microphthalmia syndrome (Esmailpour et al, JMG, 2014), and DHTKD1 and OGDHL in eosinophilic esophagitis (Sherrill et al, 2018, JCI Insight). For these novel disease-causing genes, his group has also established and characterized disease-causing genes with both an induced pluripotent stem cell model and a CRISPR/Cas9 produced mouse model (Li et al HMG 2017) in order to better study pathogenesis and develop treatments.

=== Differentiated Retinal Ganglion Cell Derivation from Pluripotent Stem Cells ===
Huang's laboratory was the very first to develop a novel stepwise, chemical protocol for the cellular differentiation of human embryonic stem (hES) cells and induced pluripotent stem (iPS) cells into functional retinal ganglion cells (RGCs) (Riazifar et al 2014, Stem cells translational medicine; Chen et al Stem Cell Res Ther, 2016). His studies showed that a single chemical Notch inhibitor, DAPT, can induce PAX6/RX-positive stem cells to undergo differentiation into functional RGCs. Pre-clinical trials are now on-going in animals.

=== Aging Associated Mitochondrial Mutations and its Epigenetic Consequences ===
In collaboration with Mitalipov's group, Huang's group demonstrated that mutations of the mitochondrial genome accumulate rapidly with age in somatic tissues, leading to defects in mitochondrial metabolism (Kang et al, Cell Stem Cell, 2016). Increased production of reactive oxygen species (ROS) due to mitochondrial dysfunction can affect telomere shortening and methylation in CpG islands in the nuclear genome. In addition, ROS was found to influence nuclear DNA methylation. Moreover, ROS has the ability to downregulate gene expression via CpG island methylation of the promoter. Huang's group is in the process of testing his hypothesis that the mitochondrial dysfunction caused by age-related mutations in mtDNA results in increased ROS production and is linked to epigenetic markers of aging.

=== Biparental mtDNA Inheritance ===
Recently, Huang has identified multiple unrelated multi-generation families with a high level of mtDNA heteroplasmy. A panoramic understanding of mtDNA segregation in these families shows biparental mtDNA transmission with an autosomal dominant-like inheritance mode (Luo et al, PNAS, 2018). His results challenge the central dogma of maternal inheritance of mtDNA and strongly support the possibility of paternal mtDNA transmission. Elucidating the molecular mechanism may provide alternative approaches to reducing transmission of mutant mtDNA from carrier women to offspring, thereby providing a potential avenue for treatment.
