= Aldehyde deformylating oxygenase =

Enzyme family

Aldehyde oxygenase (deformylating)
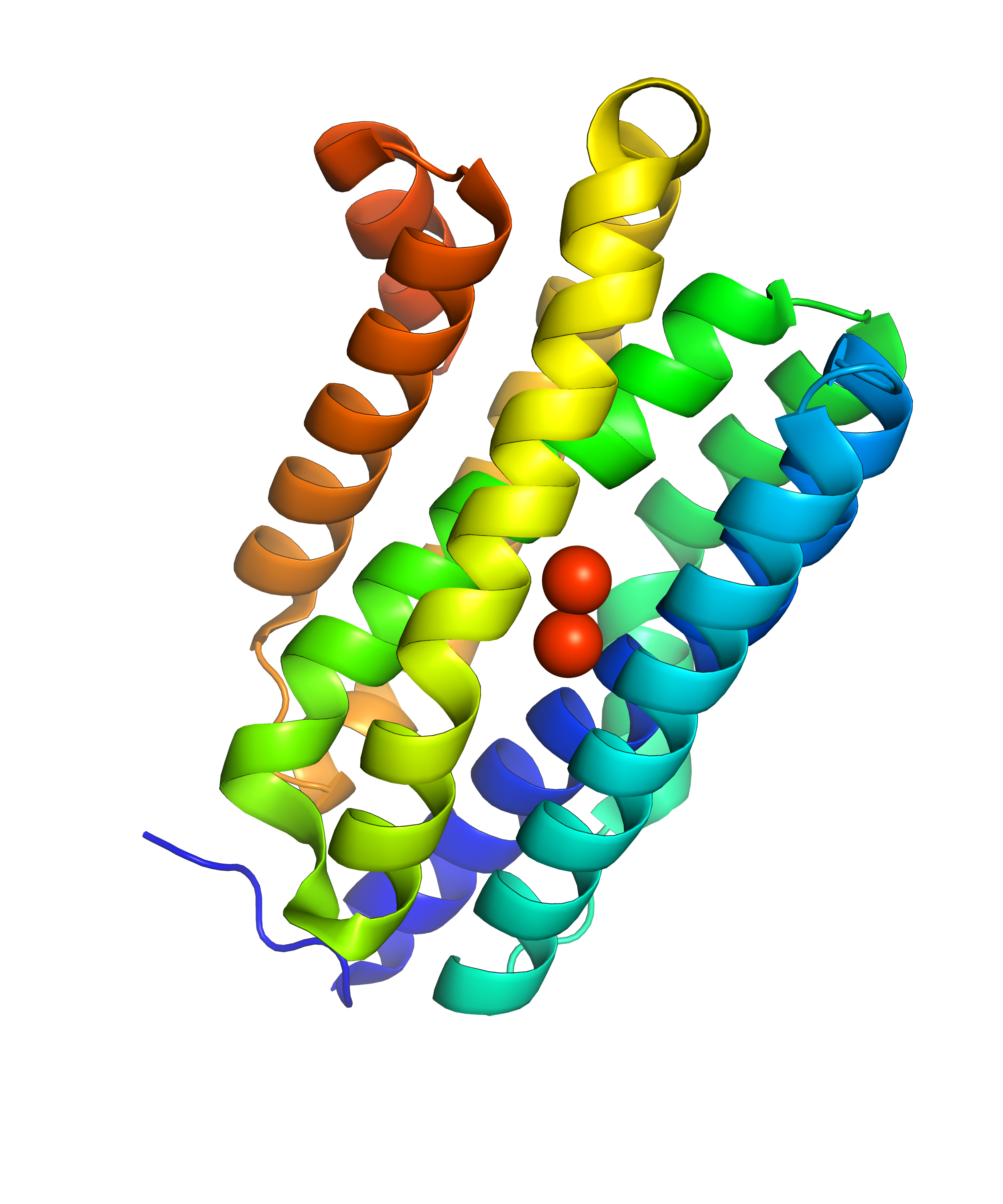
- Structure of P. marinus cyanobacterial aldehyde deformylating oxygenase in the active conformation (PDB: 4PGI)

Identifiers
- EC no.: 4.1.99.5
- Alt. names: Aldehyde decarbonylase

Databases
- IntEnz: IntEnz view
- BRENDA: BRENDA entry
- ExPASy: NiceZyme view
- KEGG: KEGG entry
- MetaCyc: metabolic pathway
- PRIAM: profile
- PDB structures: RCSB PDB PDBe PDBsum
Search
- PMC: articles
- PubMed: articles
- NCBI: proteins

Aldehyde deformylating oxygenases (ADO) (EC 4.1.99.5) are a family of enzymes which catalyze the oxygenation of medium and long chain aldehydes to alkanes via the removal of a carbonyl group as formate.

n-aldehyde + O_{2} + 2 NADPH + H^{+} → (n-1)-alkane + formate + H_{2}O + 2 NADP^{+}

Aldehyde deformylating oxygenases are found in cyanobacteria as part of the alkane biosynthesis pathway. Their substrates are medium- to long-chain aldehydes formed from acyl-ACP by acyl-ACP reductases (EC 1.2.1.80), commonly of 16 and 18 carbons, but potentially as short as 9 carbons and 10 carbons. Compared to other aldehyde decarbonylases, such as insect or plant aldehyde decarbonylase, cyanobacterial ADO is unusual in evolving formate rather than CO or CO_{2} and for residing in the cytosol. It is also enzymatically unusual in catalyzing an formally hydrolytic and redox-neutral oxygenation of the substrate.

== Structure ==
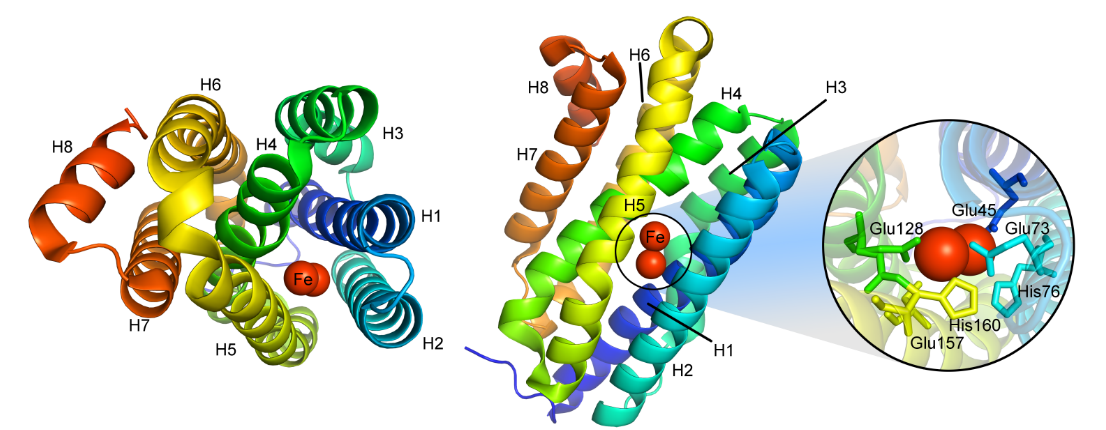
Active conformation of P. marinus cADO (PDB: 4GPI-A) showing active site coordination.

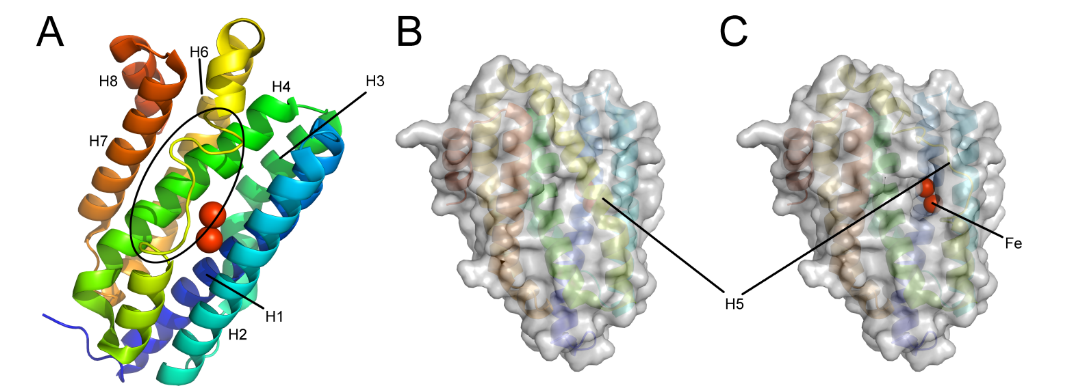
Apoenzyme conformation of P.marinus cADO (PDB: 4GPI-B) showing helix 5 unfolding and active site exposure. Cofactors are included for illustration.

Cyanobacterial aldehyde deformylating oxygenases are cytosolic nonheme di-iron oxygenases, but are much smaller (29 kDa) than other members of the family, and share sequence homology with ferritin-like or ribonucleotide reductases. The overall structure is a bundle of 8 alpha-helices coordinating two central iron cofactors via histidine, aspartate and glutamate. The substrate channels lies parallel to the helices and terminates at the di-iron center.

Conformational changes during the enzymatic cycle of Synechococcus elongates ADO have been observed (PDB: 4QUW, PDB: 4RC6, PDB: 4RC7, PDB: 4RC8). The binding of the substrate aldehyde displaces two coordinating residues on helix 5 (Glu157 and His160), causing a portion of the helix (residues 144-150) to unwind. The resulting hole in the protein surface exposes the active site, facilitating the entrance of the cosubstrate oxygen.

A similar conformational change has been observed for Prochlorococcus marinus ADO (PDB: 4PGI), in which residues 154-165 on helix 5 are unwound in the apoenzyme conformation to facilitate metal entry.

== Mechanism ==
The reaction catalyzed by ADO is unusual in that it is an oxygenation reaction which results in the formal hydrolysis, rather than oxidation, of the substrate. The exact mechanism is not completely understood, and current understanding is based on a consensus between mechanistic studies and comparison with similar enzymes. The structurally similar R2 unit of ribonucleotide reductase proceeds via a tyrosyl radical mechanism, but the homologous tyrosine is replaced by phenylalanine in ADO.

Mechanistic studies suggest that the aldehyde hydrogen is retained in the formate, the alkane hydrogen derives from the solvent, and one formate oxygen originates from O_{2}. The mechanism is tentatively hypothesized to take place by the following steps:

1. The reduced di-iron coordinates oxygen, which oxidizes the iron and forms a peroxide species.
2. The peroxide species attacks the aldehyde.
3. An electron transfer coupled with cleavage of the peroxo species generates a hemi-acetal radical.
4. The terminal C-C bond cleaves homolytically to form the alkyl radical and release formate.
5. The alkyl radical is quenched by final electron transfer.
6. Two electron transfers restore the reduced state of di-iron and release a molecule of water.

Non-specific formation of alcohols rather than alkanes has also been observed, which would instead correspond to a heterolytic cleavage.

== Kinetics ==
The K_{m} for O_{2} is 84 ± 9 μM. However, the observed catalytic turnover is extremely inefficient, on the order of k_{cat} = 1 min^{−1}, raising the possibility that the current understanding of the functional role, cofactors, or even substrates of ADO are incorrect. Transgenetically expressed, ADO appears to be dependent on ferredoxin-ferredoxin reductase to deliver reducing equivalents, but the endogenous reducing system is not known. Further, oxygen-independent aldehyde deformylation has also been observed.

H_{2}O_{2} is an inhibitor of cADO, and an ADO-catalase fusion protein exhibits improved turnover. Short-chain aldehydes are also observed to be substrate inhibitors.
