= 2-Oxoadipate dehydrogenase complex =

Multienzyme complex

The 2-oxoadipate dehydrogenase complex (OADHC, OADHc) or α-ketoadipate dehydrogenase complex is a mitochondrial, multienzyme complex, most commonly known for its role in the degradation of lysine, tryptophan and hydroxylysine. It belongs to the 2-oxoacid dehydrogenase complex family.

== Reaction ==
The enzymatic activity of the 2-oxoadipate dehydrogenase complex can be summarized by the following reaction:

2-oxoadipate + CoA + NAD^{+} → glutaryl-CoA + CO_{2} + NADH + H^{+}

The OADHC can also process 2-oxopimelate, a non-native substrate, but does so over 100 times less efficiently than its natural substrate, 2-oxoadipate.

== Components ==
The OADHC consists of three distinct enzymatic components:

Component	EC number	Name	Gene	Cofactor
E1a		2-Oxoadipate dehydrogenase	DHTKD1	Thiamine pyrophosphate (TPP)
E2o	EC 2.3.1.61	Dihydrolipoyl succinyltransferase	DLST	Lipoic acid, coenzyme A
E3	EC 1.8.1.4	Dihydrolipoyl dehydrogenase	DLD	FAD, NAD

E1a is unique to this complex, with the "a" referring to the 2-oxoadipate dehydrogenase complex. The "o" in E2o comes from the 2-oxoglutarate dehydrogenase complex (OGDC), in which the same protein functions as the E2 component.

== Function ==
=== Glutarylation of mitochondrial proteins ===
OADHC catalyzes the oxidative decarboxylation of 2-oxoadipate to glutaryl-CoA in the lysine and tryptophan degradation pathway. Glutaryl-CoA can act as an acyl group donor for lysine glutarylation, a non-enzymatic post-translational modification. OADHC itself has been shown to undergo autoglutarylation, which may inhibit its activity and create a feedback regulatory loop. The mitochondrial sirtuin SIRT5 can remove glutaryl groups in a NAD^{+}-dependent manner.

== Reactive oxygen species (ROS) ==
The OADHC produces superoxide and hydrogen peroxide at levels comparable to the flavin site of Complex I, a known source of mitochondrial reactive oxygen species (ROS). However, its activity is much lower than that of other related enzymes—approximately sevenfold lower than the 2-oxoglutarate dehydrogenase complex (OGDC), fourfold lower than the pyruvate dehydrogenase complex (PDC), and about half that of the branched-chain α-ketoacid dehydrogenase complex (BCKDC).

ROS production increases when the NAD(P)H to NAD(P)^{+} ratio is high, but only during the forward reaction where 2-oxoadipate is converted into glutaryl-CoA. In contrast, reverse electron flow through isolated E3 with NADH does not generate ROS, indicating that full substrate turnover by the intact complex is required.

The ROS-producing site within OADHC appears to be a flavin-containing region distinct from that in OGDC. OADHC thus represents a mitochondrial ROS source and is part of the NADH isopotential pool—a group of enzymes with similar redox characteristics that generate ROS under highly reduced conditions.

== Structural and functional similarities ==
The 2-oxoadipate dehydrogenase complex (OADHC) is one of four mitochondrial 2-oxoacid dehydrogenase complexes, alongside the 2-oxoglutarate dehydrogenase complex (OGDC), the branched-chain α-ketoacid dehydrogenase complex (BCKDC), and pyruvate dehydrogenase complex (PDC). All of these multienzyme systems catalyze the oxidative decarboxylation of their respective 2-oxoacid substrates and share a common modular architecture, consisting of three core components: E1 (a substrate-specific decarboxylase), E2 (dihydrolipoamide acyltransferase), and E3 (dihydrolipoamide dehydrogenase). Notably, OADHC and OGDC share the same E2 component (DLST), while PDC and BCKDC utilize distinct E2 components. All four complexes, however, share the same E3 component and depend on the same essential cofactors: thiamine pyrophosphate (TPP), lipoic acid, FAD, NAD^{+}, and CoA.

2-Oxoacid dehydrogenase complexes
		2-Oxoadipate dehydrogenase complex (OADHC)	Oxoglutarate dehydrogenase complex (OGDC)	Branched-chain α-ketoacid dehydrogenase complex (BCKDC)			Pyruvate dehydrogenase complex (PDC)
Pathway		Degradation of lysine, tryptophan & hydroxylysine	Citric acid cycle	Degradation of branched-chain amino acids:			Connection of glycolysis with citric acid cycle
Pathway		Degradation of lysine, tryptophan & hydroxylysine	Citric acid cycle	Leucine	Isoleucine	Valine	Connection of glycolysis with citric acid cycle
Substrate		2-Oxoadipate	2-Oxoglutarate	α-Ketoisocaproate	α-Keto-β-methylvalerate	α-Ketoisovalerate	Pyruvate
Product		Glutaryl-CoA	Succinyl-CoA	Isovaleryl-CoA	2-Methylbutyryl-CoA	Isobutyryl-CoA	Acetyl-CoA
Component	E1	DHTKD1	OGDH	BCKDHA, BCKDHB			PDHA1, PDHB
Component	E2	DLST		DBT			DLAT
Component	E3	DLD					
Component	E3BP	—					PDHX
Cofactor		Thiamine pyrophosphate (TPP), lipoic acid, coenzyme A, FAD, NAD					

Beyond its similarities with other members of the 2-oxoacid dehydrogenase complex family, OADHC also shares key features with the glycine cleavage system (GCS). Instead of being a three-component multienzyme complex, the GCS consists of four distinct proteins (P, H, T, and L), with the L-protein being identical to the E3 component (DLD) found in 2-oxoacid dehydrogenase complexes. Like the latter, the GCS depends on common cofactors such as lipoic acid, FAD, and NAD^{+}. Unlike the 2-oxoacid dehydrogenase complexes, the GCS uniquely requires tetrahydrofolate (THF). This shared use of the E3/DLD component highlights a core biochemical link between the 2-oxoacid dehydrogenase complexes and the GCS, despite their distinct substrates, cofactor dependencies, and roles in ROS production and metabolic regulation.

== Clinical relevance ==
=== Alpha‑aminoadipic and alpha‑ketoadipic aciduria (AMOXAD) ===
Biallelic mutations in the DHTKD1 gene, which encodes the E1a component of the OADHC, cause a rare autosomal recessive disorder known as alpha-aminoadipic and alpha-oxoadipic aciduria (AMOXAD). This condition leads to accumulation of 2-oxoadipate and 2-aminoadipate in plasma and urine due to impaired degradation of lysine, hydroxylysine, and tryptophan. Clinical symptoms vary widely, ranging from asymptomatic biochemical abnormalities to developmental delay, epilepsy, or hypotonia. The precise clinical significance of these metabolite accumulations remains unclear.

=== Lipoylation disorders ===
Defects in mitochondrial lipoylation pathways can impair multiple 2-oxoacid dehydrogenase complexes, including the OADHC. In fibroblasts from individuals with LIPT1 deficiency, reduced OADHC-dependent metabolic flux has been observed. While the effects on OADHC are less thoroughly characterized than for PDC or OGDHC, the findings indicate that OADHC activity is also sensitive to impaired lipoylation.

== Note ==
Unlike 2-oxoglutarate dehydrogenase complex, the "2-" in 2-oxoadipate dehydrogenase complex should not be omitted, as "oxoadipate" alone could refer to other isomers such as 3-oxoadipate.

== See also ==
- Dehydrogenase
- Keto acid
