= Alpha-aminoadipic semialdehyde synthase =

Protein-coding gene in the species Homo sapiens

AASS

Identifiers
- Aliases: AASS, LKR/SDH, LKRSDH, LORSDH, aminoadipate-semialdehyde synthase
- External IDs: OMIM: 605113; MGI: 1353573; GeneCards: AASS
Enzyme activity
EC #	BRENDA	ExPASy	KEGG	MetaCyc
1.5.1.8	↗	↗	↗	↗
1.5.1.9	↗	↗	↗	↗

Gene location (Human)
Chr.	Chromosome 7 (human)
Band	7q31.32	Start	122,064,583 bp
Band	7q31.32	End	122,144,308 bp

Gene location (Mouse)
Chr.	Chromosome 6 (mouse)
Band	6 A3.1|6 10.27 cM	Start	23,072,172 bp
Band	6 A3.1|6 10.27 cM	End	23,132,985 bp
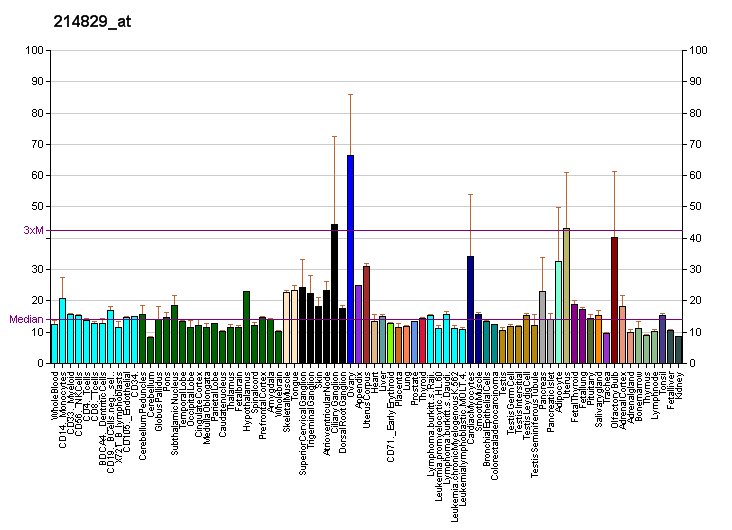

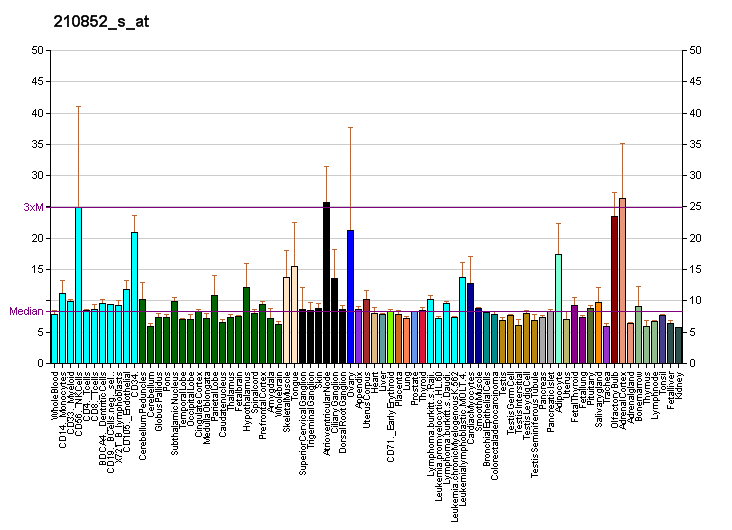
RNA expression pattern
Bgee	Human / Mouse (ortholog); Top expressed in: gastric mucosa; left ovary; right ovary; tibial nerve; right lobe of liver; left uterine tube; right lung; sural nerve; popliteal artery; tibial arteries / Top expressed in: submandibular gland; right kidney; human kidney; parotid gland; left lobe of liver; lacrimal gland; primary oocyte; choroid plexus of fourth ventricle; seminal vesicula; vestibular membrane of cochlear duct; More reference expression data
BioGPS	More reference expression data
Gene ontology
Molecular function	oxidoreductase activity; saccharopine dehydrogenase (NADP+, L-lysine-forming) activity; saccharopine dehydrogenase (NAD+, L-glutamate-forming) activity; catalytic activity; saccharopine dehydrogenase activity
Cellular component	mitochondrial matrix; intracellular membrane-bounded organelle; mitochondrion; cytoplasm
Biological process	L-lysine catabolic process to acetyl-CoA via saccharopine; L-lysine catabolic process; metabolism; protein tetramerization; lysine catabolic process; generation of precursor metabolites and energy; lysine biosynthetic process via aminoadipic acid
Sources:Amigo / QuickGO
Orthologs
Databases	NCBI: entry; OMA: entry
Species	Human	Mouse
Entrez	10157	30956
Ensembl	ENSG00000008311	ENSMUSG00000029695
UniProt	Q9UDR5	Q99K67
RefSeq (mRNA)	NM_005763	NM_013930
RefSeq (protein)	NP_005754	NP_038958
Location (UCSC)	Chr 7: 122.06 – 122.14 Mb	Chr 6: 23.07 – 23.13 Mb
PubMed search
- Wikidata
View/Edit Human	View/Edit Mouse

Alpha-aminoadipic semialdehyde synthase is an enzyme encoded by the AASS gene in humans and is involved in their major lysine degradation pathway. It is similar to the separate enzymes coded for by the LYS1 and LYS9 genes in yeast, and related to, although not similar in structure, the bifunctional enzyme found in plants. In humans, mutations in the AASS gene, and the corresponding alpha-aminoadipic semialdehyde synthase enzyme are associated with familial hyperlysinemia. This rare disease is inherited in an autosomal recessive pattern and patients often have no clinical symptoms.

== Function ==
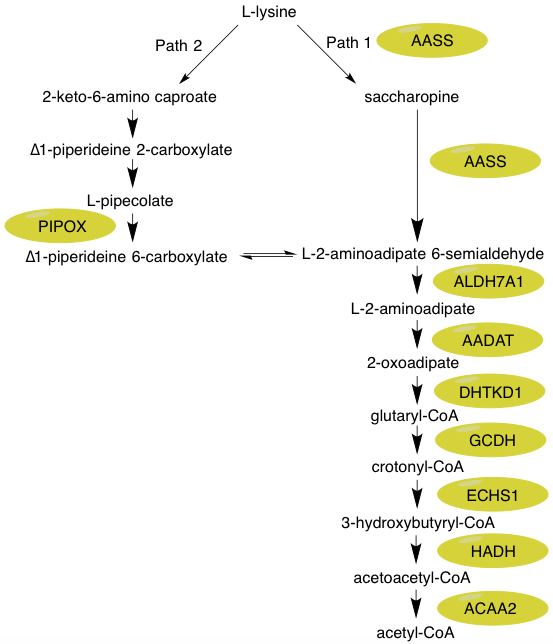

The alpha-aminoadipic semialdehyde synthase protein catalyzes the first two steps in the mammalian L-lysine degradation via saccharopine pathway within the mitochondria, which is thought to be the main metabolic route for lysine degradation in upper eukaryotes. The specific subpathway that this enzyme focuses on is the synthesis of glutaryl-CoA from L-lysine. Glutaryl-CoA can act as an intermediate in a more expanded conversion/degradation pathway from L-lysine to acetyl-CoA.

Two noticeable components of the L-lysine degradation via saccharopine pathway are the intermediately-used reaction/product glutamate and the eventual carbon sink acetyl-CoA. Glutamate is an important compound within the body which acts as a neurotransmitter tied to learning and Huntington's disease. Acetyl-CoA is arguably of an even higher level of importance, acting as one of the integral components of the Citric Acid/Kreb cycle, with the primary function of delivering an acetyl group to be oxidized for energy production. Thus, the function of alpha-aminoadipic semialdehyde synthase is tied to the levels of two integral compounds within the body.

== Mechanism ==
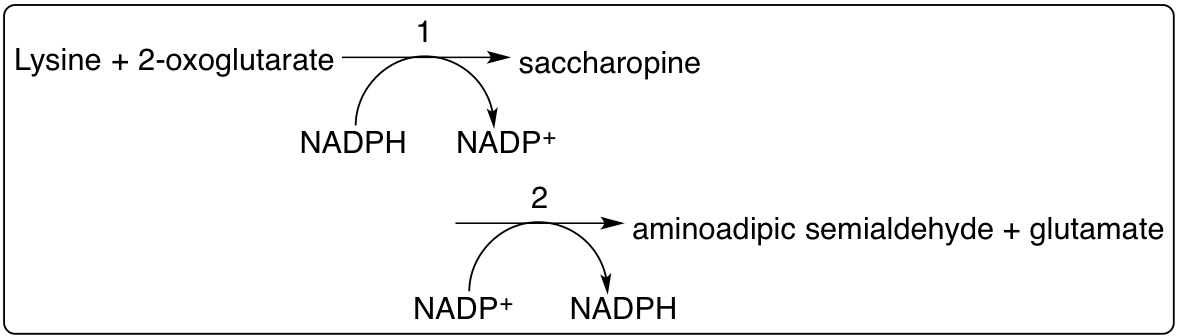
Lysine Degradation Steps Catalyzed by Alpha-aminoadipic semialdehyde dehydrogenase

First, the N-terminal portion of this enzyme which contains lysine-ketoglutarate reductase (LOR/LKR) activity (EC:1.5.1.8) condenses lysine and 2-oxoglutarate to a molecule called saccharopine (Reaction 1 on the figure to the right). Then, the C-terminal portion of this enzyme, which contains saccharopine dehydrogenase (SHD) activity (EC:1.5.1.9), catalyzes the oxidation of saccharopine to produce alpha-aminoadipic semialdehyde and glutamate (Reaction 2 on the figure to the right). Note: These reactions are the reverse of the corresponding steps in the lysine biosynthesis pathways present in yeast and fungi.

These reactions can be visualized as well in reaction equation form:

N(6)-(L-1,3-dicarboxypropyl)-L-lysine + NADP^{+} + H_{2}O = L-lysine + 2-oxoglutarate + NADPH followed by

N(6)-(L-1,3-dicarboxypropyl)-L-lysine + NAD^{+} + H_{2}O = L-glutamate + (S)-2-amino-6-oxohexanoate + NADH.

== Structure ==
The native human enzyme is bifunctional, much like the LKR/SHD found in plants, and thus, is thought to be similar in structure. The bifunctionality of this enzyme comes from the fact that it contains two distinct active sites, one at its C-terminal, and one at its N-terminal. The C-terminal portion of alpha-aminoadipic semialdehyde synthase contains the SHD activity and the N-terminal portion contains LKR. To date, a structure of alpha-aminoadipic semialdehyde synthase has not been determined. The enzyme does not have linker region present in plants between its C and N-termini, so theories suggest the actual structure contains an LKR-activity region bound to an SHD-activity region, like that in Magnaporthe grisea.

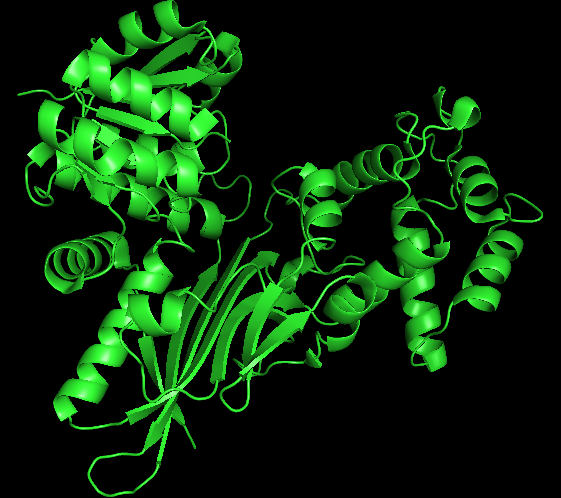
Crystal structure of saccharopine reductase from Magnaporthe grisea

== Disease relevance ==
Alpha-aminoadipic semialdehyde synthase is encoded for by the AASS gene, and mutations in this gene lead to hyperlysinemia. This is characterized by impaired breakdown of lysine which results in elevated levels of lysine in the blood and urine. These increased levels of lysine do not appear to have any negative effects on the body. Other names for this condition include:

- alpha-aminoadipic semialdehyde deficiency disease
- familial hyperlysinemia
- lysine alpha-ketoglutarate reductase deficiency disease
- saccharopine dehydrogenase deficiency disease
- saccharopinuria

Hyperlysinemia is characterized by elevated plasma lysine levels that exceed 600 μmol/L and can reach up to 2000 μmol/L. These increased levels of lysine do not appear to have any negative effects on the body. The main reason for this is that several alternative biochemical reactions can take place. First, lysine can be used in place of ornithine in the urea cycle resulting in the production of homoarginine. Additionally, even though most mammals use the saccharopine pathway for most lysine degradation (Path 1), the brain has an alternative pathway (Path 2) which goes through an L-pipecolic acid intermediate - both of these can be seen in the figure. Path 1 takes place in the mitochondria while Path 2 takes places in the peroxisome. Looking at other key enzymes within the L-lysine degradation pathway, ALDH7A1 is deficient in children with pyridoxine-dependent seizures. GCDH is deficient in glutaric aciduria type 1. The intermediate 2-oxoadipate is metabolized by 2-oxoadipate dehydrogenase, resembling the Citric Acid/Kreb cycle enzyme complex 2-oxoglutarate dehydrogenase.

Two types of familial hyperlysinemia have been described so far: type I is associated with a combined deficiency of the two enzyme activities, LOR and SDH, whereas in familial hyperlysinemia type II only the saccharopine dehydrogenase activity is impaired. Type II hyperlysinemia is also referred to as saccharopinuria.

An additional condition shown to be related to hyperlysinemia is dienoyl-CoA reductase deficiency, though this is a relatively recent discovery and there are not many publications supporting this.
