= L-saccharopine oxidase =

Identifiers
- EC no.: 1.5.3.18

Databases
- IntEnz: IntEnz view
- BRENDA: BRENDA entry
- ExPASy: NiceZyme view
- KEGG: KEGG entry
- MetaCyc: metabolic pathway
- PRIAM: profile
- PDB structures: RCSB PDB PDBe PDBsum
Search
- PMC: articles
- PubMed: articles
- NCBI: proteins

L-saccharopine oxidase (EC 1.5.3.18, FAP2) is an enzyme with systematic name L-saccharopine:oxygen oxidoreductase (L-glutamate forming). This enzyme catalyses the following chemical reaction

saccharopine
+ H_{2}O
O_{2}
H_{2}O_{2}
O_{2}
H_{2}O_{2}
glutamic acid
+
L-allysine

The enzyme is involved in pipecolic acid biosynthesis in Rhizoctonia leguminicola.
