= L-lysine 6-transaminase =

Identifiers
- EC no.: 2.6.1.36
- CAS no.: 9054-68-6

Databases
- IntEnz: IntEnz view
- BRENDA: BRENDA entry
- ExPASy: NiceZyme view
- KEGG: KEGG entry
- MetaCyc: metabolic pathway
- PRIAM: profile
- PDB structures: RCSB PDB PDBe PDBsum
- Gene Ontology: AmiGO / QuickGO
Search
- PMC: articles
- PubMed: articles
- NCBI: proteins

L-lysine 6-transaminase (EC 2.6.1.36) is an enzyme originally characterised from Flavobacterium fuscum that catalyzes a reversible chemical reaction that interconverts L-lysine and α-ketoglutaric acid with L-allysine and glutamic acid.

L-lysine
+
α-ketoglutaric acid
L-allysine
+
L-glutamic acid

This enzyme is a transferase, specifically a transaminase, which transfer nitrogenous groups. This enzyme participates in lysine biosynthesis. It uses pyridoxal phosphate as a cofactor.

== Nomenclature ==
The systematic name of this enzyme class is L-lysine:2-oxoglutarate 6-aminotransferase. Other names in common use include

- lysine 6-aminotransferase,
- lysine epsilon-aminotransferase,
- lysine epsilon-transaminase,
- lysine:2-ketoglutarate 6-aminotransferase,
- L-lysine-alpha-ketoglutarate aminotransferase, and
- L-lysine-alpha-ketoglutarate 6-aminotransferase.

== Structure ==
L-lysine 6-transaminase belongs to the aminotransferase class-III family. Crystal structures of L-lysine 6-transaminase reveal a Glu243 “switch” through which the enzyme changes substrate specificities.
