= Saccharopinuria =

- Other names: Hyperlysinemia type II
- Saccharopine

Saccharopinuria (an excess of saccharopine in the urine), also called saccharopinemia, saccharopine dehydrogenase deficiency or alpha-aminoadipic semialdehyde synthase deficiency, is a variant form of hyperlysinemia. It is caused by a partial deficiency of the enzyme saccharopine dehydrogenase, which plays a secondary role in the lysine metabolic pathway. Inheritance is thought to be autosomal recessive, but this cannot be established as individuals affected by saccharopinuria typically have only a 40% reduction in functional enzyme.

== See also ==
- Hyperlysinemia
