= Propionate fermentation =

Organic fermentation process

Propionate fermentation is a form of fermentation with propionic acid as one of the products. This process is done through the fermentation pathway of bacteria. It is used in a variety of industrial, food-making, and medical applications. There is interest in propionic acid as a feedstock for bioplastic and other chemical applications.

== Process ==
Propionate fermentation is named for the end product of the process. Bacteria do this process to make ATP, a high energy molecule that powers additional cellular processes. This is done independent of oxygen and is thus anaerobic. Like in standard fermentation pathways, propionate fermentation involves the bacterium taking up saccharides, such as glucose, and breaking them down through glycolysis to produce pyruvate. Pyruvate is then converted into propionic acid through multiple reduction steps in the Wood-Werkman cycle. The resulting products besides propionate include acetic acid, carbon dioxide, and succinic acid.

In Prevotella, the redox reaction is supported with RNF oxidoreductase to metabolize carbohydrates into glucose, succinate, and finally propionate. Also known as ferredoxin-NAD+ oxidoreductase, RNF balances oxidation-reduction cofactors in the latter part of the formation path. With a mixed culture of fermenters, glycerol can be used as a source for high-purity propionate.

Other pathways by which bacteria may reduce sugars to propionate include the acrylate pathway, the propanediol pathway, or by employing a sodium ion-pump.

== Applications ==
=== Food production ===
In food production, propionate is a common preservative due to its ability to inhibit bacterial and fungal growth and its classification as safe for consumption. Swiss cheese is a food where propionate fermentation is commonly used for its unique flavor profile.

The production of propionate currently relies on processes that are not cost effective. There is potential to rely on microbes, such as those in the genus Propionibacterium, for the commercial production of propionate instead, using common industrial byproducts such as glycerol.

Physiologically, propionate acts as an appetite suppressant, though the practicality of this characteristic has yet to be explored.

=== Health applications ===
Propionate is a short-chain fatty acid produced when gut microbiota ferment dietary fiber. It supports brain health and may protect against neuroinflammation and neurodegenerative diseases. Additionally, propionate has shown potential in reducing serum cholesterol levels, lipogenesis, and carcinogenesis. It is also known for its cardiovascular, anti-diabetic, anti-obesity, and immunoregulatory properties. By stimulating smooth muscle contractions, propionate promotes bowel movements and gut motility. It also increases mucus secretion, boosts serotonin release, and enhances blood flow through the colonic arteries, which may help reduce colorectal cancer risk. However, elevated propionate levels, often due to vitamin B12 deficiency in the elderly, can lead to conditions like propionic acidemia, hyperammonemia, and dementia. Enhancing propionate production can lead to numerous health benefits, and this can be achieved through diet, pre/probiotics, and fecal transplants. Increasing dietary fiber intake encourages gut microbiota to produce more propionate, supporting overall health.

=== Additional applications ===
For waste treatment, propionate can be produced from breaking down food waste. Prior to fermentation, it is made into a broth rich in lactate by hydrolysis and fermentation. The broth is then sterilized to be put into pure cultures of microbes with the aforementioned capability. This can be adjusted to produce other fatty acids besides propionate for additional industrial applications.

=== Economic and environmental application ===
By using the production of propionic acid through glycerol fermentation is able to offer an economic and environmental sustainability, this is because it is able to be friendlier eco-friendly and an alternative to the typically petrochemical methods used. With this process there is an ability to contribute a positive life cycle assessment that can be done by utilizing renewable resources and minimize environmental impact. This can be from raw materials, fermentation and upstream and down streaming process. Something else than can be taken into consideration for using is the reduction of greenhouse gas emissions. Being able to use raw material means that there can be an achievement towards emission reduction, and overall carbon footprint. The optimization of being able to use feedstocks like glycerol or dairy by-products is able to boost the environments performance by repurposing the waste and materials lowering pollution, this supports waste reduction.
