= Procollagen galactosyltransferase =

Class of enzymes

procollagen galactosyltransferase

Identifiers
- EC no.: 2.4.1.50
- CAS no.: 9028-07-3

Databases
- BRENDA: enzyme data
- ExPASy: NiceZyme view
- KEGG: enzyme entry
- MetaCyc: metabolic pathway
- Rhea: reactions
- PDB structures: RCSB PDB PDBe PDBsum
- Gene Ontology: AmiGO / QuickGO
Search
- PMC: articles
- PubMed: articles
- NCBI: proteins

In enzymology, a procollagen galactosyltransferase (EC 2.4.1.50) is an enzyme that catalyzes the chemical reaction

UDP-galactose + procollagen 5-hydroxy-L-lysine $\rightleftharpoons$ UDP + procollagen 5-(D-galactosyloxy)-L-lysine

Thus, the two substrates of this enzyme are UDP-galactose and procollagen 5-hydroxy-L-lysine, whereas its two products are UDP and procollagen 5-(D-galactosyloxy)-L-lysine.

== Nomenclature ==
- Family: glycosyltransferases, specifically the hexosyltransferases
- Systematic name: UDP-galactose D-galactosyltransferase
- Other names:
  - hydroxylysine galactosyltransferase
  - collagen galactosyltransferase
  - collagen hydroxylysyl galactosyltransferase
  - UDP galactose-collagen galactosyltransferase
  - uridine diphosphogalactose-collagen galactosyltransferase
  - UDPgalactose:5-hydroxylysine-collagen galactosyltransferase
- Pathway lysine degradation

== Human genes ==
Human genes encoding enzymes with procollagen galactosyltransferase activity include: Human genes encoding enzymes with procollagen galactosyltransferase activity (EC 2.4.1.50) include:

- COLGALT1 (GLT25D1)
- COLGALT2 (GLT25D2)
- PLOD3 (LH3), which UniProt also annotates with lysyl hydroxylase (EC 1.14.11.4) and procollagen glucosyltransferase (EC 2.4.1.66) activities

== Structure and functions of procollagen galactosyltransferase 1 ==
Procollagen galactosyltransferase 1 (GT251), encoded by the COLGALT1 gene, plays a crucial role in lysyl O-linked glycosylation and the maturation of collagen. GT251 consists of two galactosyltransferase domains (GalT-N and GalT-C) and is stabilized in a dimeric form. The GT251 dimer can further associate with LH3 (encoded by PLOD3) to form a heterotetrameric complex, known as the KOGG complex (Lysyl Hydroxylation-Galactosylation-Glucosylation complex). Within this complex, three key enzymatic reactions in lysine O-linked glycosylation are coordinately catalyzed by LH3 and GT251, ensuring proper collagen modification and structural integrity.
