= Hydroxylysine kinase =

Class of enzymes

Identifiers
- EC no.: 2.7.1.81
- CAS no.: 9073-58-9

Databases
- IntEnz: IntEnz view
- BRENDA: BRENDA entry
- ExPASy: NiceZyme view
- KEGG: KEGG entry
- MetaCyc: metabolic pathway
- PRIAM: profile
- PDB structures: RCSB PDB PDBe PDBsum
- Gene Ontology: AmiGO / QuickGO
Search
- PMC: articles
- PubMed: articles
- NCBI: proteins

Hydroxylysine kinase (EC 2.7.1.81) is an enzyme that catalyzes the chemical reaction

GTP +
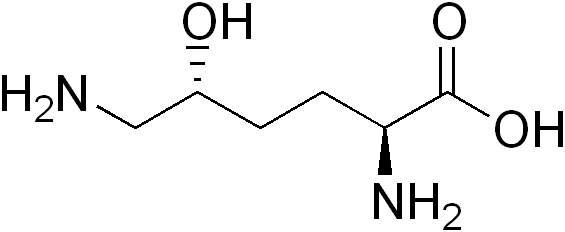
hydroxylysine
GDP +
5-phosphonooxy-L-lysine

The enzyme characterised from rat liver converts hydroxylysine to 5-phosphonooxy-L-lysine by transferring a phosphate group from the cofactor, guanosine trphosphate (GTP), which is converted to guanosine diphosphate (GDP). The reaction is a step in lysine degradation.

This enzyme is a transferase, specifically one transferring phosphorus-containing groups (phosphotransferases) with an alcohol group as acceptor. The systematic name of this enzyme class is GTP:5-hydroxy-L-lysine O-phosphotransferase. Other names in common use include hydroxylysine kinase (phosphorylating), and guanosine triphosphate:5-hydroxy-L-lysine O-phosphotransferase.
