= First Affiliated Hospital of Fujian Medical University =

Hospital in Fujian, China

The First Affiliated Hospital of Fujian Medical University (Chinese: 福建医科大学附属第一医院) is a Grade A tertiary hospital in Fujian Province of China. Founded in 1937, it has now developed into the largest general hospital in the province, integrating medical treatment, teaching and research.

== History ==
In 1937, the first public Western Medicine hospital was established in Fuzhou, capital city of Fujian Province, China.

In 1938, the hospital moved to Shaxian County.

In 1945, the hospital moved back to Fuzhou.

In 1950, it merged with the Fuzhou Medical Association Hospital (and was renamed "Fuzhou Joint Hospital").

In 1954, the hospital became an affiliated hospital of Fujian Medical College.

In 1969, during the Cultural Revolution, the hospital was abolished, and its personnel were transferred to eight counties in northern and western Fujian.

On 1985, the staff moved back to Chating, Fuzhou, and the hospital was resumed. There were 300 beds and 300 staff members.

In 1995, the hospital was promoted to a "Grade A tertiary hospital".

In 2000, the hospital was officially established as the First Clinical Medical College of Fujian Medical University.

In 2005, the Minnan Campus was founded.

In 2019, the hospital became one of the first batch of national regional medical center construction units.

On May 1, 2021, the Binhai Campus of the First Affiliated Hospital of Fujian Medical University (Fudan University Affiliated Huashan Hospital Fujian Hospital) officially opened.

On December 20, 2021, the Olympic Sports Campus of the First Affiliated Hospital of Fujian Medical University (the Dermatology and Venereology Branch of the First Affiliated Hospital of Fujian Medical University, and the Fujian Provincial Institute of Dermatology and Venereology) officially opened.

== Campus Distribution ==
The First Affiliated Hospital of Fujian Medical University has a number of campuses, including

Chating Campus (Main Campus): No. 20, Chazhong Road, Taijiang District, Fuzhou City.

Binhai Campus (Fudan University Affiliated Huashan Hospital Fujian Hospital): No. 999, Huashan Road, Wansha Village, Changle District, Fuzhou City.

Olympic Sports Campus (Dermatology and Venereology Branch of the First Affiliated Hospital of Fujian Medical University, Fujian Provincial Institute of Dermatology and Venereology): No. 200, Jianxin South Road, Cangshan District, Fuzhou City.

Changle Branch (Changle District People's Hospital, Changle District General Hospital): No. 333, Xiyang South Road, Changle District, Fuzhou City.

Minnan Medical Hospital (Quanzhou Port District General Hospital): No. 2098, Xiangyun South Road, Quanzhou Port District, Quanzhou City.

== Other information ==
As of 2025, the First Affiliated Hospital of Fujian Medical University has a total of more than 5,600 employees, 2.8049 million outpatient and emergency visits and more than 100,000 surgeries. It is strong in the areas of rare diseases, hepatobiliary surgery, neurology, and plastic surgery.

The hospital is the largest in Fujian Province, with 4,500 beds, integrating medical treatment, teaching, and scientific research.

In scientific research, the First Affiliated Hospital of Fujian Medical University published 48 papers listed in Nature Index for the time frame of 1 July 2025 - 30 June 2026, ranking 200th globally and 84th in China in healthcare.

In the 2024 China Hospital and Specialty Reputation Ranking, the First Affiliated Hospital of Fujian Medical University ranked A++ (top-60) in the comprehensive hospital ranking, and #3 in Rare Disease and #9 in Neurology nationally.

== See also ==
- Fujian Medical University
- List of hospitals in China
