= Oxoglutarate dehydrogenase complex =

Multienzyme complex involved in Kreb's cycle

oxoglutarate dehydrogenase

Identifiers
- EC no.: 1.2.4.2
- CAS no.: 9031-02-1

Databases
- BRENDA: enzyme data
- ExPASy: NiceZyme view
- KEGG: enzyme entry
- MetaCyc: metabolic pathway
- Rhea: reactions
- PDB structures: RCSB PDB PDBe PDBsum
- Gene Ontology: AmiGO / QuickGO
Search
- PMC: articles
- PubMed: articles
- NCBI: proteins

The oxoglutarate dehydrogenase complex (OGDC) or α-ketoglutarate dehydrogenase complex is a mitochondrial multienzyme complex, most commonly known for its role in the citric acid cycle. It belongs to the 2-oxoacid dehydrogenase complex family.

== Units ==
Much like pyruvate dehydrogenase complex (PDC), this enzyme forms a complex composed of three components:

Unit	EC number	Name	Gene	Cofactor
E1o	EC 1.2.4.2	oxoglutarate dehydrogenase	OGDH	thiamine pyrophosphate (TPP)
E2o	EC 2.3.1.61	dihydrolipoyl succinyltransferase	DLST	lipoic acid, Coenzyme A
E3	EC 1.8.1.4	dihydrolipoyl dehydrogenase	DLD	FAD, NAD

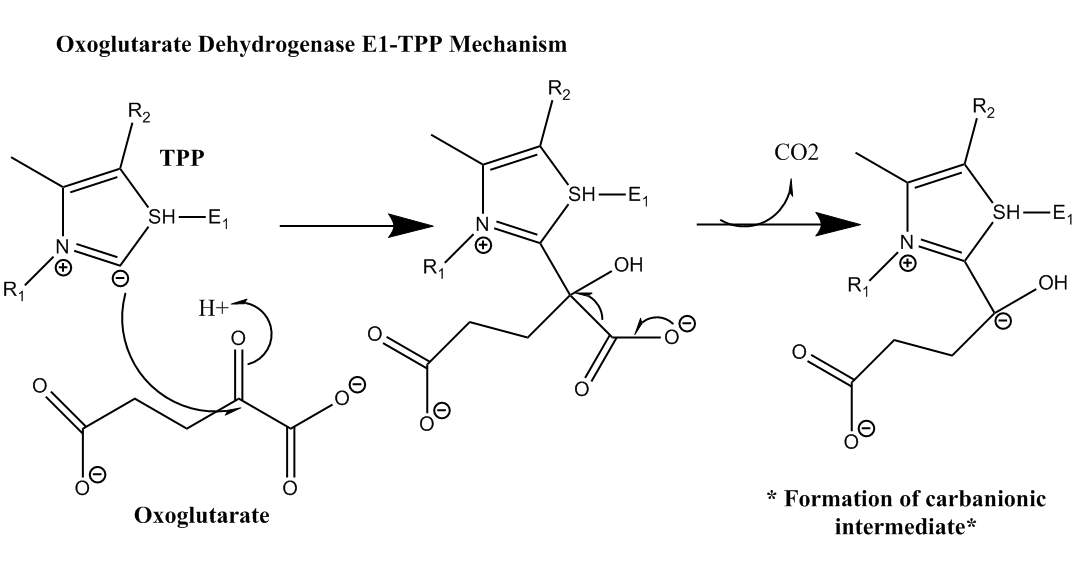
The OGDH E1-TPP mechanism involves the formation of a stabilized carbanion intermediate.

Four members of these multienzyme complexes have been characterized: one specific for pyruvate, a second specific for 2-oxoglutarate, a third specific for 2-oxoadipate, and a fourth specific for branched-chain α-keto acids. The oxoglutarate dehydrogenase complex has the same subunit structure and thus uses the same cofactors (TPP, CoA, lipoate, FAD and NAD) as:

- the pyruvate dehydrogenase complex (PDHC),
- the 2-oxoadipate dehydrogenase complex (OADHC),
- and the branched-chain alpha-keto acid dehydrogenase complex (BCKDC).

Among these, OGDC and OADHC are particularly closely related, as they not only share the same E2 and E3 components, but also catalyze chemically similar reactions within adjacent steps of lysine and tryptophan catabolism. Notably, all four complexes rely on a common E3 subunit that is also employed by the glycine cleavage system (GCS) in the form of its L-protein, despite the GCS not belonging to this enzyme family.

== Properties ==
=== Metabolic pathways ===
This enzyme participates in three different pathways:

- Citric acid cycle (KEGG link: MAP00020)
- Lysine degradation (KEGG link: MAP00310)
- Tryptophan metabolism (KEGG link: MAP00380)

=== Kinetic properties ===
The following values are from Azotobacter vinelandii ^{(1)}:

- K_{M}: 0.14 ± 0.04 mM
- V_{max} : 9 ± 3 μmol.min^{−1}.mg^{−1}

== Citric acid cycle ==
=== Reaction ===
The reaction catalyzed by this enzyme in the citric acid cycle is:

α-ketoglutarate + NAD^{+} + CoA → Succinyl CoA + CO_{2} + NADH

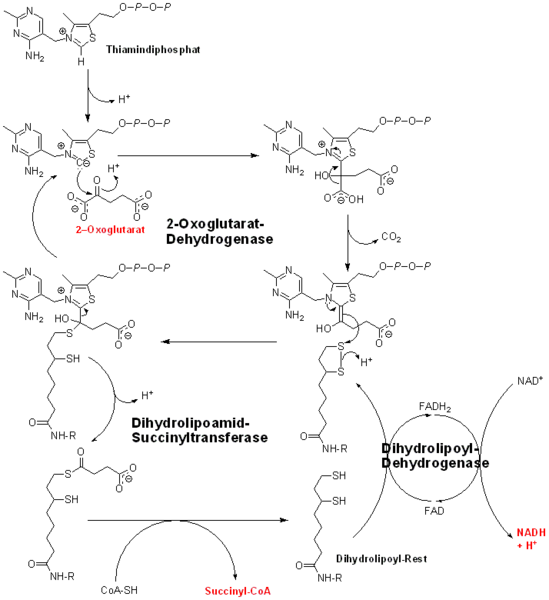
Oxoglutarate dehydrogenase (α-Ketoglutarate dehydrogenase)

This reaction proceeds in three steps:

- decarboxylation of α-ketoglutarate,
- reduction of NAD^{+} to NADH,
- and subsequent transfer to CoA, which forms the end product, succinyl CoA.

ΔG°' for this reaction is -7.2 kcal mol^{−1}. The energy needed for this oxidation is conserved in the formation of a thioester bond of succinyl CoA.

=== Regulation ===
Oxoglutarate dehydrogenase is a key control point in the citric acid cycle. It is inhibited by its products, succinyl CoA and NADH. A high energy charge in the cell will also be inhibitive. ADP and calcium ions are allosteric activators of the enzyme.

By controlling the amount of available reducing equivalents generated by the Krebs cycle, Oxoglutarate dehydrogenase has a downstream regulatory effect on oxidative phosphorylation and ATP production. Reducing equivalents (such as NAD+/NADH) supply the electrons that run through the electron transport chain of oxidative phosphorylation. Increased Oxoglutarate dehydrogenase activation levels serve to increase the concentrations of NADH relative to NAD+. High NADH concentrations stimulate an increase in flux through oxidative phosphorylation.

While an increase in flux through this pathway generates ATP for the cell, the pathway also generates free radical species as a side product, which can cause oxidative stress to the cells if left to accumulate.

Oxoglutarate dehydrogenase is considered to be a redox sensor in the mitochondria, and has an ability to change the functioning level of mitochondria to help prevent oxidative damage. In the presence of a high concentration of free radical species, Oxoglutarate dehydrogenase undergoes fully reversible free radical mediated inhibition. In extreme cases, the enzyme can also undergo complete oxidative inhibition.

When mitochondria are treated with excess hydrogen peroxide, flux through the electron transport chain is reduced, and NADH production is halted. Upon consumption and removal of the free radical source, normal mitochondrial function is restored.

It is believed that the temporary inhibition of mitochondrial function stems from the reversible glutathionylation of the E2-lipoac acid domain of Oxoglutarate dehydrogenase. Glutathionylation, a form of post-translational modification, occurs during times of increased concentrations of free radicals, and can be undone after hydrogen peroxide consumption via glutaredoxin. Glutathionylation "protects" the lipoic acid of the E2 domain from undergoing oxidative damage, which helps spare the Oxoglutarate dehydrogenase complex from oxidative stress.

Oxoglutarate dehydrogenase activity is turned off in the presence of free radicals in order to protect the enzyme from damage. Once free radicals are consumed by the cell, the enzyme's activity is turned back on via glutaredoxin. The reduction in activity of the enzyme under times of oxidative stress also serves to slow the flux through the electron transport chain, which slows production of free radicals.

In addition to free radicals and the mitochondrial redox state, Oxoglutarate dehydrogenase activity is also regulated by ATP/ADP ratios, the ratio of Succinyl-CoA to CoA-SH, and the concentrations of various metal ion cofactors (Mg2+, Ca2+). Many of these allosteric regulators act at the E1 domain of the enzyme complex, but all three domains of the enzyme complex can be allosterically controlled. The activity of the enzyme complex is upregulated with high levels of ADP and Pi, Ca2+, and CoA-SH. The enzyme is inhibited by high ATP levels, high NADH levels, and high Succinyl-CoA concentrations.

=== Stress response ===
Oxoglutarate dehydrogenase plays a role in the cellular response to stress. The enzyme complex undergoes a stress-mediated temporary inhibition upon acute exposure to stress. The temporary inhibition period sparks a stronger up-regulation response, allowing an increased level of oxoglutarate dehydrogenase activity to compensate for the acute stress exposure. Acute exposures to stress are usually at lower, tolerable levels for the cell.

Pathophysiologies can arise when the stress becomes cumulative or develops into chronic stress. The up-regulation response that occurs after acute exposure can become exhausted if the inhibition of the enzyme complex becomes too strong. Stress in cells can cause a deregulation in the biosynthesis of the neurotransmitter glutamate. Glutamate toxicity in the brain is caused by a buildup of glutamate under times of stress. If oxoglutarate dehydrogenase activity is dysfunctional (no adaptive stress compensation), the build-up of glutamate cannot be fixed, and brain pathologies can ensue. Dysfunctional oxoglutarate dehydrogenase may also predispose the cell to damage from other toxins that can cause neurodegeneration.

== Pathology ==
2-Oxo-glutarate dehydrogenase is an autoantigen recognized in primary biliary cirrhosis, a form of acute liver failure. These antibodies appear to recognize oxidized protein that has resulted from inflammatory immune responses. Some of these inflammatory responses are explained by gluten sensitivity. Other mitochondrial autoantigens include pyruvate dehydrogenase and branched-chain alpha-keto acid dehydrogenase complex, which are antigens recognized by anti-mitochondrial antibodies.

Activity of the 2-oxoglutarate dehydrogenase complex is decreased in many neurodegenerative diseases. Alzheimer's disease, Parkinson's disease, Huntington disease, and supranuclear palsy are all associated with an increased oxidative stress level in the brain. Specifically for Alzheimer Disease patients, the activity of oxoglutarate dehydrogenase is significantly diminished. This leads to a possibility that the portion of the TCA cycle responsible for causing the build-up of free radical species in the brain of patients is a malfunctioning oxoglutarate dehydrogenase complex. The mechanism for disease-related inhibition of this enzyme complex remains relatively unknown.

In the metabolic disease combined malonic and methylmalonic aciduria (CMAMMA) due to ACSF3 deficiency, mitochondrial fatty acid synthesis (mtFAS) is impaired, which is the precursor reaction of lipoic acid biosynthesis. The result is a reduced lipoylation degree of important mitochondrial enzymes, such as oxoglutarate dehydrogenase complex (OGDC).
