= Semialdehyde =

In organic chemistry, a semialdehyde is a compound containing an aldehyde and a carboxylic acid functional groups. Semialdehydes are common in biochemistry. The simplest semialdehydes have the formula HO_{2}C(CH_{2})_{n}CHO. As illustrated by the behavior of the smallest member, glyoxylic acid, semialdehydes often exist as hydrates (geminal diols) HO_{2}C(CH_{2})_{n}CH(OH)_{2}.

Some of semialdehydes and their parent dicarboxylic acids are listed below.

Selected Semialdehydes and their parent diacid
Semialdehyde	Dicarboxylic acid
malonic semialdehyde	malonic acid
tartronic semialdehyde	tartronic acid
succinic semialdehyde	succinic acid
methylmalonic semialdehyde	methylmalonic acid
aspartic-4-semialdehyde	aspartic acid
glutamic-1-semialdehyde	glutamic acid
glutamic-5-semialdehyde	glutamic acid
4-hydroxymuconic-semialdehyde	4-Hydroxymuconic acid
2-amino-3-carboxymuconic semialdehyde	2-amino-4-carboxymuconic acid
alpha-aminoadipic semialdehyde	alpha-aminoadipic acid

Although structurally related to semialdehydes, dicarboxylic acids are rarely biochemical precursors to them.
