= Pyridinoline =

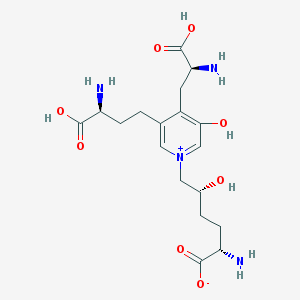

Identifiers
CAS Number	63800-01-1
3D model (JSmol)	Interactive image
ChemSpider	94798
PubChem CID	105068
CompTox Dashboard (EPA)	DTXSID00980373
- InChI: InChI=1S/C18H28N4O8/c19-12(16(25)26)3-1-9-6-22(7-10(23)2-4-13(20)17(27)28)8-15(24)11(9)5-14(21)18(29)30/h6,8,10,12-14,23H,1-5,7,19-21H2,(H3-,24,25,26,27,28,29,30)/t10-,12+,13+,14+/m1/s1 Key: LCYXYLLJXMAEMT-SAXRGWBVSA-N
- SMILES: C1=C(C(=C(C=[N+]1C[C@@H](CC[C@@H](C(=O)[O-])N)O)O)C[C@@H](C(=O)O)N)CC[C@@H](C(=O)O)N

Properties
Chemical formula	C_{18}H_{28}N_{4}O_{8}
Molar mass	428.43692 g mol^{−1}
- Except where otherwise noted, data are given for materials in their standard state (at 25 °C [77 °F], 100 kPa). Infobox references

Pyridinoline, also known as Hydroxylysylpyridinoline, is a fluorescent cross-linking compound of collagen fibers. Crosslinks in collagen and elastin are derived from lysyl and hydroxylysyl residues, a process catalyzed by lysyl oxidase. Fujimoto and colleagues first described the isolation and characterization of a fluorescent material in bovine Achilles tendon collagen and termed it pyridinoline. It is reported to be present in collagen of bone and cartilage, but is absent in collagen of skin. It is not present in newly synthesized collagen and is formed from aldimine cross-links during maturation of collagen fibers.

Pyridinoline and deoxypyridinoline were found to be released into the blood during bone degradation and rapidly excreted in the urine. In a preliminary study, both these compounds were proposed as a marker for metastatic bone tumor in patients with prostate cancer.
