= Deoxypyridinoline =

Names
- Systematic IUPAC name (2R)-6-{3-[(3S)-3-Amino-3-carboxypropyl]-4-[(2S)-2-amino-3-carboxyethyl]-5-hydroxypyridin-1-ium-1-yl}hexanoate

Identifiers
CAS Number	83462-55-9
3D model (JSmol)	Interactive image
ChEBI	CHEBI:89510
ChemSpider	94801
PubChem CID	105071
UNII	GXI9WV7IP9
CompTox Dashboard (EPA)	DTXSID701009105
- InChI: InChI=1S/C18H28N4O7/c19-12(16(24)25)3-1-2-6-22-8-10(4-5-13(20)17(26)27)11(15(23)9-22)7-14(21)18(28)29/h8-9,12-14H,1-7,19-21H2,(H3-,23,24,25,26,27,28,29)/t12-,13+,14+/m1/s1 Key: ZAHDXEIQWWLQQL-RDBSUJKOSA-N
- SMILES: C1=C(C(=C(C=[N+]1CCCC[C@H](C(=O)[O-])N)O)C[C@@H](C(=O)O)N)CC[C@@H](C(=O)O)N

Properties
Chemical formula	C_{18}H_{28}N_{4}O_{7}
Molar mass	412.43752 g mol^{−1}

Related compounds
Related compounds	pyridinoline
- Except where otherwise noted, data are given for materials in their standard state (at 25 °C [77 °F], 100 kPa). Infobox references

Deoxypyridinoline, also called D-Pyrilinks, Pyrilinks-D, or deoxyPYD, is one of two pyridinium cross-links that provide structural stiffness to type I collagen that is found in bones, the other being pyridinoline. It is excreted unmetabolized in urine and is a specific marker of bone resorption and osteoclastic activity. It is measured in urine tests and is used along with other bone markers such as alkaline phosphatase, osteocalcin, and N-terminal telopeptide to diagnose bone diseases such as postmenopausal osteoporosis, bone metastasis, and Paget's disease. Furthermore, it has been useful in monitoring treatments that contain bone-active agents such as estrogens and bisphosphonates.

Certain studies have attempted to generate a standardization of Deoxypyridinoline via an individual molar absorptivity value at acid and neutrality pH. The result was 5160 and 5290 L mol^{−1} cm^{−1} respectively.
