= DHTKD1 =

Protein-coding gene in the species Homo sapiens

Identifiers
- Aliases: DHTKD1, AMOXAD, CMT2Q, dehydrogenase E1 and transketolase domain containing 1, AAKAD
- External IDs: OMIM: 614984; MGI: 2445096; GeneCards: DHTKD1

Gene location (Human)
Chr.	Chromosome 10 (human)
Band	10p14	Start	12,068,954 bp
Band	10p14	End	12,123,221 bp

Gene location (Mouse)
Chr.	Chromosome 2 (mouse)
Band	2|2 A1	Start	5,896,115 bp
Band	2|2 A1	End	5,942,792 bp
RNA expression pattern
Bgee	Human / Mouse (ortholog); Top expressed in: liver; right lobe of liver; secondary oocyte; parotid gland; ventricular zone; renal medulla; ganglionic eminence; kidney tubule; human kidney; gonad / Top expressed in: zygote; liver; secondary oocyte; left lobe of liver; human kidney; spermatocyte; primary oocyte; proximal tubule; parotid gland; morula; More reference expression data
BioGPS	n/a
Gene ontology
Molecular function	thiamine pyrophosphate binding; oxidoreductase activity; oxidoreductase activity, acting on the aldehyde or oxo group of donors, disulfide as acceptor; oxoglutarate dehydrogenase (succinyl-transferring) activity
Cellular component	oxoglutarate dehydrogenase complex; cytosol; mitochondrial matrix; mitochondrion
Biological process	metabolism; tricarboxylic acid cycle; glycolytic process; generation of precursor metabolites and energy; hematopoietic progenitor cell differentiation
Sources:Amigo / QuickGO
Orthologs
Databases	NCBI: entry; OMA: entry
Species	Human	Mouse
Entrez	55526	209692
Ensembl	ENSG00000181192	ENSMUSG00000025815
UniProt	Q96HY7	A2ATU0
RefSeq (mRNA)	NM_018706	NM_001081131
RefSeq (protein)	NP_061176	NP_001074600
Location (UCSC)	Chr 10: 12.07 – 12.12 Mb	Chr 2: 5.9 – 5.94 Mb
PubMed search
- Wikidata
View/Edit Human	View/Edit Mouse

Dehydrogenase E1 and transketolase domain containing 1 is a mitochondrial protein that in humans is encoded by the DHTKD1 gene. This gene encodes a component of the 2-oxoadipate dehydrogenase complex (OADHC) involved in the degradation pathways of several amino acids, including lysine. Mutations in this gene are associated with 2-aminoadipic 2-oxoadipic aciduria and Charcot-Marie-Tooth Disease Type 2Q.

== Structure ==
The DHTKD1 gene encodes a protein that has 919 amino acids, and is one of two isoforms within the 2-oxoadipate dehydrogenase complex.

== Function ==
DHTKD1 is part of the OADHC that is responsible for a crucial step in the degradation pathways of L-lysine, L-hydroxylysine, and L-tryptophan. Specifically, this enzyme catalyzes the decarboxylation of 2-oxoadipate to glutaryl-CoA. There is a strong correlation between DHTKD1 expression levels and ATP production, which signifies that DHTKD1 plays a critical role in energy production in mitochondria. Moreover, suppression of DHTKD1 results in decreased levels of biogenesis and increased levels of reactive oxygen species (ROS) within the mitochondria. Globally, this impairs cell growth and enhances cell apoptosis.

== Clinical significance ==
Mutations in the DHTKD1 gene are associated with alpha-aminoadipic and alpha-ketoadipic aciduria, an autosomal recessive inborn error of lysine, hydroxylysine, and tryptophan degradation. Only a handful of mutations have been observed in patients, including three missense mutations, two nonsense mutations, two splice donor mutations, one duplication, and one deletion and insertion. Two missense mutations are the most common cause of the deficiency. The clinical presentation of this disease in inconsistent.

Mutations in this gene could also cause neurological abnormalities. Indeed, one form of Charcot-Marie-Tooth (CMT) disease has been associated with DHTKD1, although the disease encompasses a wide spectrum of clinical neuropathies. Specifically, a heterogeneous nonsense mutation within the gene leads to decreased levels of DHTKD1 mRNA and proteins, and impaired ATP generation. This implicates this mutation as a causative agent for CMT-2 Disease.
