= Collagen beta(1-O)galactosyltransferase 1 =

Protein-coding gene in the species Homo sapiens

COLGALT1

Identifiers
- Aliases: COLGALT1, GLT25D1, collagen beta(1-O)galactosyltransferase 1, ColGalT 1, BSVD3
- External IDs: OMIM: 617531; MGI: 1924348; GeneCards: COLGALT1
Enzyme activity
EC #	BRENDA	ExPASy	KEGG	MetaCyc
2.4.1.50	↗	↗	↗	↗

Gene location (Human)
Chr.	Chromosome 19 (human)
Band	19p13.11	Start	17,555,649 bp
Band	19p13.11	End	17,583,162 bp

Gene location (Mouse)
Chr.	Chromosome 8 (mouse)
Band	8|8 B3.3	Start	72,063,642 bp
Band	8|8 B3.3	End	72,077,555 bp
RNA expression pattern
Bgee	Human / Mouse (ortholog); Top expressed in: stromal cell of endometrium; granulocyte; monocyte; spleen; right coronary artery; upper lobe of left lung; canal of the cervix; left coronary artery; smooth muscle tissue; apex of heart / Top expressed in: calvaria; dermis; stroma of bone marrow; efferent ductule; human fetus; vas deferens; body of femur; Gonadal ridge; umbilical cord; carotid body; More reference expression data
BioGPS	n/a
Gene ontology
Molecular function	transferase activity; glycosyltransferase activity; procollagen galactosyltransferase activity
Cellular component	endoplasmic reticulum lumen; membrane; endoplasmic reticulum
Biological process	positive regulation of collagen fibril organization
Sources:Amigo / QuickGO
Orthologs
Databases	NCBI: entry; OMA: entry
Species	Human	Mouse
Entrez	79709	234407
Ensembl	ENSG00000130309	ENSMUSG00000034807
UniProt	Q8NBJ5	Q8K297
RefSeq (mRNA)	NM_024656	NM_146211; NM_001364443
RefSeq (protein)	NP_078932	NP_666323; NP_001351372
Location (UCSC)	Chr 19: 17.56 – 17.58 Mb	Chr 8: 72.06 – 72.08 Mb
PubMed search
- Wikidata
View/Edit Human	View/Edit Mouse

Collagen beta(1-O)galactosyltransferase 1 is a protein that in humans is encoded by the COLGALT1 gene.

== Function ==
The protein encoded by this gene is one of two enzymes that transfers galactose moieties to hydroxylysine residues of collagen and mannose binding lectin. This gene is constitutively expressed and encodes a soluble protein that localizes to the endoplasmic reticulum.
