= PLOD3 =

Protein-coding gene in the species Homo sapiens

Identifiers
- Aliases: PLOD3, LH3, procollagen-lysine,2-oxoglutarate 5-dioxygenase 3
- External IDs: OMIM: 603066; MGI: 1347008; GeneCards: PLOD3
Enzyme activity
EC #	BRENDA	ExPASy	KEGG	MetaCyc
1.14.11.4	↗	↗	↗	↗
2.4.1.50	↗	↗	↗	↗
2.4.1.66	↗	↗	↗	↗

Gene location (Human)
Chr.	Chromosome 7 (human)
Band	7q22.1	Start	101,205,977 bp
Band	7q22.1	End	101,218,420 bp

Gene location (Mouse)
Chr.	Chromosome 5 (mouse)
Band	5 G2|5 76.09 cM	Start	137,015,873 bp
Band	5 G2|5 76.09 cM	End	137,025,502 bp
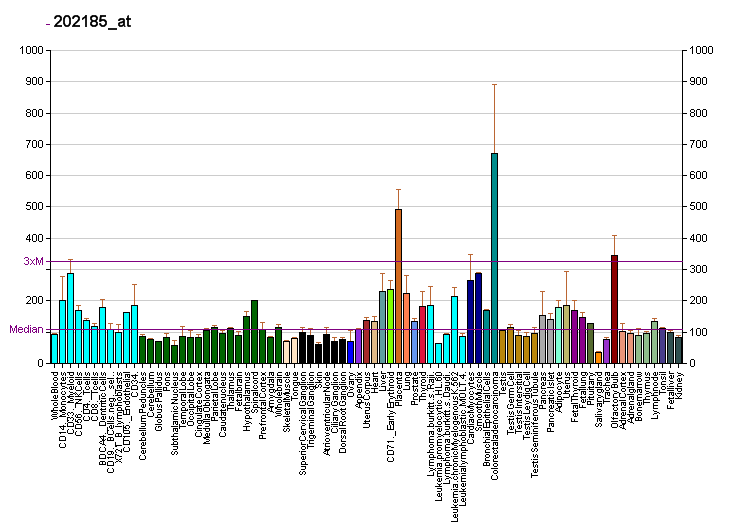
RNA expression pattern
Bgee	Human / Mouse (ortholog); Top expressed in: stromal cell of endometrium; pancreatic ductal cell; tibial nerve; mucosa of transverse colon; C1 segment; body of uterus; granulocyte; upper lobe of left lung; muscle layer of sigmoid colon; right lobe of liver / Top expressed in: granulocyte; calvaria; yolk sac; stroma of bone marrow; ankle joint; tibiofemoral joint; gastrula; lactiferous gland; muscle of thigh; ventricular zone; More reference expression data
BioGPS	More reference expression data
Gene ontology
Molecular function	iron ion binding; L-ascorbic acid binding; dioxygenase activity; metal ion binding; protein binding; oxidoreductase activity, acting on paired donors, with incorporation or reduction of molecular oxygen; procollagen galactosyltransferase activity; oxidoreductase activity; procollagen-lysine 5-dioxygenase activity; procollagen glucosyltransferase activity; catalytic activity; transferase activity; glycosyltransferase activity
Cellular component	rough endoplasmic reticulum membrane; endoplasmic reticulum membrane; membrane; extracellular exosome; endoplasmic reticulum; Golgi apparatus; trans-Golgi network; extracellular matrix; extracellular region; extracellular space; endoplasmic reticulum lumen; rough endoplasmic reticulum; collagen-containing extracellular matrix
Biological process	protein localization; lung morphogenesis; collagen fibril organization; epidermis morphogenesis; endothelial cell morphogenesis; vasodilation; in utero embryonic development; basement membrane assembly; cellular response to hormone stimulus; neural tube development; protein O-linked glycosylation; hydroxylysine biosynthetic process; peptidyl-lysine hydroxylation; collagen metabolic process; metabolism
Sources:Amigo / QuickGO
Orthologs
Databases	NCBI: entry; OMA: entry
Species	Human	Mouse
Entrez	8985	26433
Ensembl	ENSG00000106397	ENSMUSG00000004846
UniProt	O60568	Q9R0E1
RefSeq (mRNA)	NM_001084	NM_011962
RefSeq (protein)	NP_001075	NP_036092
Location (UCSC)	Chr 7: 101.21 – 101.22 Mb	Chr 5: 137.02 – 137.03 Mb
PubMed search
- Wikidata
View/Edit Human	View/Edit Mouse

Procollagen-lysine,2-oxoglutarate 5-dioxygenase 3 is an enzyme that in humans is encoded by the PLOD3 gene.

The protein encoded by this gene is a membrane-bound homodimeric enzyme that is localized to the cisternae of the rough endoplasmic reticulum. The enzyme (cofactors iron and ascorbate) catalyzes the hydroxylation of lysyl residues in collagen-like peptides. The resultant hydroxylysyl groups are attachment sites for carbohydrates in collagen and thus are critical for the stability of intermolecular crosslinks. Some patients with Ehlers-Danlos syndrome type VIB have deficiencies in lysyl hydroxylase activity.

== Structure and functions ==
Cryo-electron microscopy (Cryo-EM) study has revealed the structural architecture of PLOD3 within the lysyl O-linked glycosylation complex (KOGG complex), which plays a crucial role in procollagen maturation.

The KOGG complex consists of a PLOD3 (LH3) dimer, a Procollagen galactosyltransferase 1 (ColGalT1) dimer, and UDP-bound cofactors, orchestrating the hydroxylation (by PLOD3) and dual glycosylation (galactosylation by ColGalT1 and glucosylation by PLOD3) of lysine residues in the endoplasmic reticulum (ER) lumen. These modifications are essential for collagen cross-linking, fibrillogenesis, and overall structural integrity.

Additionally, the structural study suggests that the KOGG complex can polymerize into a larger, fiber-like enzyme supercomplex, which may further regulate collagen modification and assembly. Defects in PLOD3 function or glycosylation efficiency have been implicated in connective tissue disorders, including osteogenesis imperfecta and fibrosis-related diseases.
