= Octadecanal decarbonylase =

octadecanal decarbonylase

Identifiers
- EC no.: 4.1.99.5
- CAS no.: 94185-90-7

Databases
- IntEnz: IntEnz view
- BRENDA: BRENDA entry
- ExPASy: NiceZyme view
- KEGG: KEGG entry
- MetaCyc: metabolic pathway
- PRIAM: profile
- PDB structures: RCSB PDB PDBe PDBsum
- Gene Ontology: AmiGO / QuickGO
Search
- PMC: articles
- PubMed: articles
- NCBI: proteins

The enzyme octadecanal decarbonylase (EC 4.1.99.5) catalyzes the chemical reaction

octadecanal $\rightleftharpoons$ heptadecane + CO

This enzyme belongs to the family of lyases, specifically in the "catch-all" class of carbon-carbon lyases. The systematic name of this enzyme class is octadecanal alkane-lyase. Other names in common use include decarbonylase, and aldehyde decarbonylase. At least one compound, EDTA is known to inhibit this enzyme.
