= Ferredoxin reductase =

Ferredoxin reductase may refer to:

- Ferredoxin—NADP(+) reductase (FNR)
- Ferredoxin—NAD(+) reductase
- Ferredoxin—nitrite reductase
- Ferredoxin-thioredoxin reductase
