= Hyperlysinemia =

- Other names: Lysine alpha-ketoglutarate reductase deficiency
- Lysine
- Specialty: Endocrinology

Hyperlysinemia is an autosomal recessive metabolic disorder characterized by an abnormal increase of lysine in the blood, but appears to be benign. It is caused by mutations in AASS, which encodes α-aminoadipic semialdehyde synthase.

Hyperlysinemia is associated with ectopia lentis (a displacement or malposition of the eye's crystalline lens) in humans.

== Signs and symptoms ==
While hyperlysinemia typically causes no health problems, patients may exhibit behavioral abnormalities, delayed speech and language development, infantile hypotonia, intellectual disability, microcephaly, neurodevelopmental delay, psychomotor retardation, seizures, short attention spans, and short stature.

== Genetics ==
Hyperlysinemia has an autosomal recessive pattern of inheritance

Hyperlysinemia is inherited in an autosomal recessive manner. This means the defective gene responsible for the disorder is located on an autosome, and two copies of the defective gene (one inherited from each parent) are required in order to be born with the disorder. The parents of an individual with an autosomal recessive disorder both carry one copy of the defective gene, but usually do not experience any signs or symptoms of the disorder.

== See also ==
- Saccharopinuria
