= Fujian Medical University =

University in Fuzhou, Fujian, China

Coordinates: 26.06745°N 119.29949°E

- 福建医科大学
- Motto: 勤奋 严谨 求实 创新
- Motto in English: Diligence, Rigorous, Factualism, Innovation
- Type: Public university
- Established: 1937
- Location: Fuzhou, Fujian, China
- Campus: Minhou Campus (闽侯校区), Taijiang Campus (台江校区)
- Website: http://www.fjmu.edu.cn/

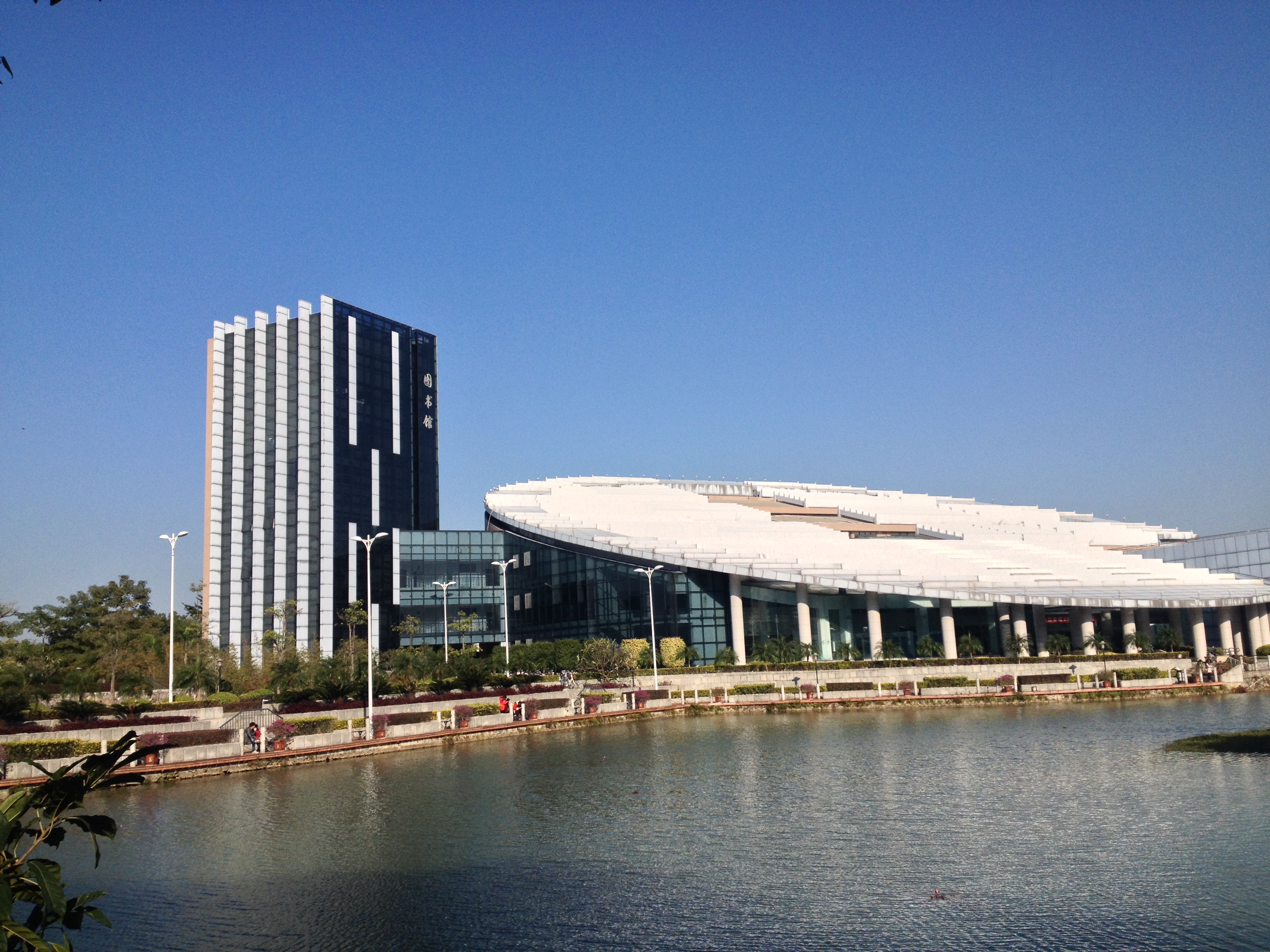
Fujian Medical University Library

Fujian Medical University (Chinese: 福建医科大学) is a university located in Fuzhou, Fujian, China. Founded in 1937 as Fujian Provincial Medical Vocational School, the school's name was changed to Fujian Provincial Medical College in 1939 and was called Fujian Medical College in 1949. In 1969, after merging with Fujian Chinese Traditional Medical College and the medical department of Huaqiao University, Fujian Medical University was founded and moved to Quanzhou, Fujian. It was moved back to Fuzhou in 1978. The name of the school was changed back to Fujian Medical College in 1982 and then changed back to the present name in April 1996.

== Campus ==
Fujian Medical University consist of two main campuses, covering over 876,710 square meters. Currently, the university consists of 17 colleges and departments, 22 undergraduate majors (aspects), 22 doctor-degree locations and 59 master-degree locations. It was conferred the right to recruit Taiwanese students by itself and the students from foreign countries, Hong Kong and Macau. There are more than 1600 postgraduates, 9300 undergraduates and 8700 vocational students. The school was affirmed as the key constructive university by the Fujian provincial government and passed through the teaching evaluation of undergraduate education with good achievements in 2003.

Departments/schools shown as below:

1. School of Basic Medicine (基础医学院)
2. Department of Clinical Medicine (临床医学部)*
3. School of Public Health (公共卫生学院)
4. School of Dentistry (口腔医学院)
5. School of Medical Technology and Engineering (医学技术与工程学院)
6. School of Pharmaceutics (药学院)
7. School of Medical Caring (护理学院)
8. School of Literature (人文学院)
9. School of Continue Education (成人教育学院)
10. School of International Education (海外教育学院)
11. Department of Physical Health (体育教研部)
12. School of Foreign Language (外国语学院)
13. Department of Political Theory and Educating (思想政治理论课教学研究部)

*Fujian Medical University's Clinical Department consists of ten affiliated hospitals, which provide FJMU's medical graduates with residency programs or intern programs.

== Faculty ==
There are over 5304 staff members on post, among which there are over 736 teachers on campus. Among the professional teachers, 56% possess a postgraduate degree and 55.2% are on the senior professional posts. There are 60PhD tutors, 469 tutors for master students, four national outstanding specialists,100 sharing the special subsidy of the state council, three outstanding specialists of Health Ministry and 16 provincial outstanding specialists.

The university has 8 affiliated hospitals, 24 teaching hospitals (including 2 clinical colleges) and more than 20 professional teaching bases. A flawless net of clinical teaching and practical teaching base has been formed.

The university library has collection of 1,430,000 volumes, and with the space of 25,600 square meters.

== See also ==
- First Affiliated Hospital of Fujian Medical University
