= Saccharopine dehydrogenase =

Saccharopine Dehydrogenase
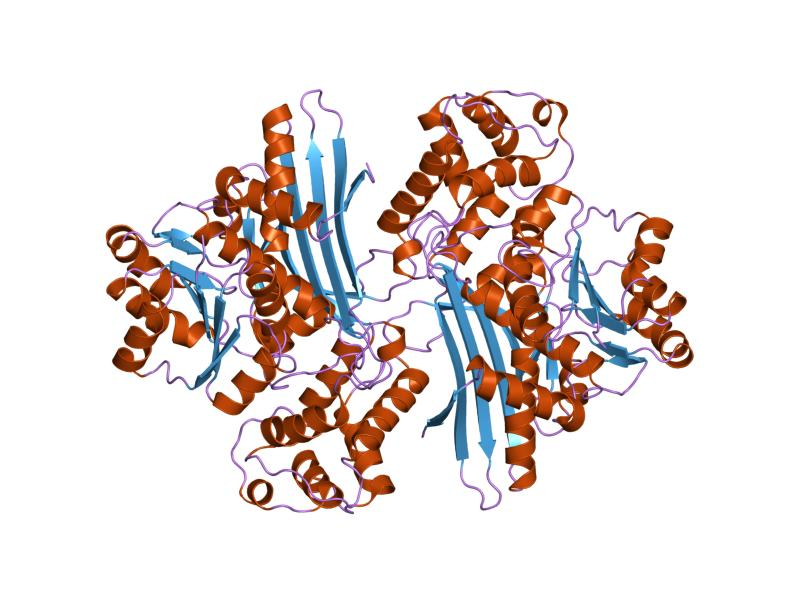
- Saccharopine dehydrogenase from Magnaporthe grisea

Identifiers
- Symbol: Saccharop_dh
- Pfam: PF03435
- Pfam clan: CL0063
- InterPro: IPR005097
- SCOP2: 1ff9 / SCOPe / SUPFAM
Available protein structures:
- PDB: IPR005097 PF03435 (ECOD; PDBsum)
- AlphaFold: IPR005097; PF03435

saccharopine dehydrogenase (putative)

Identifiers
- Symbol: SCCPDH
- NCBI gene: 51097
- HGNC: 24275
- RefSeq: NM_016002
- UniProt: Q8NBX0

Other data
- Locus: Chr. 1 q44
Search for
- Structures: Swiss-model
- Domains: InterPro

In molecular biology, the protein domain Saccharopine dehydrogenase (SDH), also named Saccharopine reductase, is an enzyme involved in the metabolism of the amino acid lysine, via an intermediate substance called saccharopine. The Saccharopine dehydrogenase enzyme can be classified under EC 1.5.1.7, EC 1.5.1.8, EC 1.5.1.9, and EC 1.5.1.10. It has an important function in lysine metabolism and catalyses a reaction in the α-aminoadipate pathway. This pathway is unique to fungal organisms therefore, this molecule could be useful in the search for new antibiotics. This protein family also includes saccharopine dehydrogenase and homospermidine synthase. It is found in prokaryotes, eukaryotes and archaea.

== Function ==
SDH uses nicotinamide adenine dinucleotide (NAD+) as an oxidant to catalyse the reversible oxidative deamination of the substrate, saccharopine. It forms the products, lysine and alpha-ketoglutaric acid. This is shown in the following chemical reaction:

Saccharopine
+ NAD^{+}
H_{2}O
H^{+}
H_{2}O
H^{+}
L-lysine
+ NADH +
α-Ketoglutaric acid

Saccharopine dehydrogenase EC catalyses the condensation to of l-alpha-aminoadipate-delta-semialdehyde (AASA) with l-glutamate to give an imine, which is reduced by NADPH to give saccharopine. In some organisms this enzyme is found as a bifunctional polypeptide with lysine ketoglutarate reductase (PF).

Homospermidine synthase proteins (EC). Homospermidine synthase (HSS) catalyses the synthesis of the polyamine homospermidine from 2 mol putrescine in an NAD^{+}-dependent reaction.

== Structure ==
There appears to be two protein domains of similar size. One domain is a Rossmann fold that binds NAD+/NADH, and the other is relatively similar. Both domains contain a six-stranded parallel beta-sheet surrounded by alpha-helices and loops (alpha/beta fold).

== Clinical significance ==
Deficiencies are associated with hyperlysinemia.
