= OGDH =

Enzyme involved in Kreb's cycle

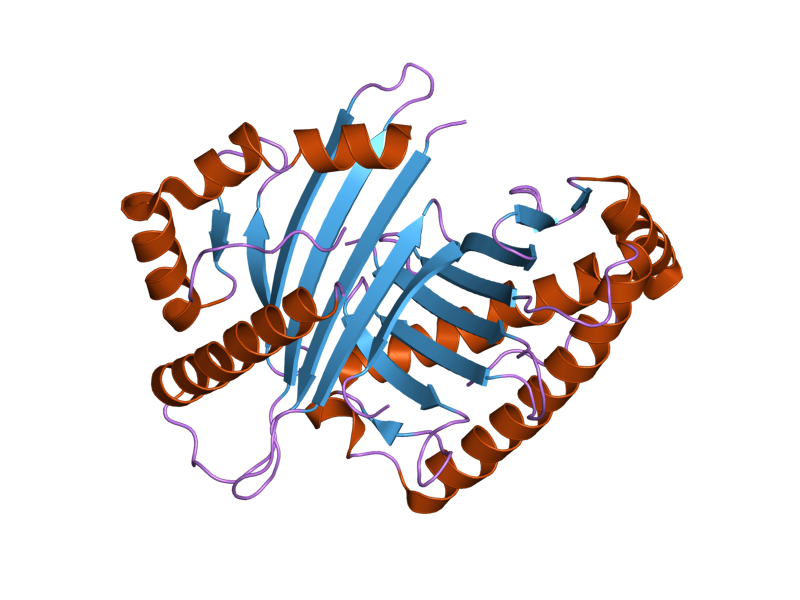

Identifiers
- Aliases: OGDH, AKGDH, E1k, OGDC, oxoglutarate dehydrogenase, KGD1, OGDH2, OGDHD
- External IDs: OMIM: 613022; MGI: 1098267; GeneCards: OGDH
Available structures
PDB	Ortholog search: PDBe RCSB
PDB	List of PDB id codes 3ERY
Enzyme activity
EC #	BRENDA	ExPASy	KEGG	MetaCyc
1.2.4.2	↗	↗	↗	↗

Gene location (Human)
Chr.	Chromosome 7 (human)
Band	7p13	Start	44,606,572 bp
Band	7p13	End	44,709,066 bp

Gene location (Mouse)
Chr.	Chromosome 11 (mouse)
Band	11|11 A1	Start	6,241,633 bp
Band	11|11 A1	End	6,306,642 bp
RNA expression pattern
Bgee	Human / Mouse (ortholog); Top expressed in: apex of heart; gastrocnemius muscle; muscle of thigh; left ventricle; right auricle of heart; triceps brachii muscle; myocardium of left ventricle; glutes; Skeletal muscle tissue of rectus abdominis; right adrenal gland / Top expressed in: myocardium of ventricle; cardiac muscle tissue of left ventricle; right ventricle; muscle of thigh; brown adipose tissue; plantaris muscle; extensor digitorum longus muscle; epithelium of stomach; digastric muscle; soleus muscle; More reference expression data
BioGPS	n/a
Gene ontology
Molecular function	oxoglutarate dehydrogenase (NAD+) activity; metal ion binding; oxidoreductase activity; oxidoreductase activity, acting on the aldehyde or oxo group of donors, disulfide as acceptor; oxoglutarate dehydrogenase (succinyl-transferring) activity; thiamine pyrophosphate binding; heat shock protein binding; chaperone binding
Cellular component	cytosol; mitochondrial membranes; mitochondrial matrix; mitochondrion; oxoglutarate dehydrogenase complex; nucleus
Biological process	glycolytic process; olfactory bulb mitral cell layer development; thalamus development; generation of precursor metabolites and energy; tangential migration from the subventricular zone to the olfactory bulb; NADH metabolic process; cerebellar cortex development; pyramidal neuron development; metabolism; hippocampus development; striatum development; 2-oxoglutarate metabolic process; succinyl-CoA metabolic process; histone succinylation; tricarboxylic acid cycle; lysine catabolic process
Sources:Amigo / QuickGO
Orthologs
Databases	NCBI: entry; OMA: entry
Species	Human	Mouse
Entrez	4967	18293
Ensembl	ENSG00000105953	ENSMUSG00000020456
UniProt	Q02218	Q60597
RefSeq (mRNA)	NM_001003941; NM_001165036; NM_002541; NM_001363523	NM_001252282; NM_001252283; NM_001252287; NM_001252288; NM_010956 NM_001361902; NM_001361903; NM_001361904; NM_001361905
RefSeq (protein)	NP_001003941; NP_001158508; NP_002532; NP_001350452	NP_001239211; NP_001239212; NP_001239216; NP_001239217; NP_035086 NP_001348831; NP_001348832; NP_001348833; NP_001348834
Location (UCSC)	Chr 7: 44.61 – 44.71 Mb	Chr 11: 6.24 – 6.31 Mb
PubMed search
- Wikidata
View/Edit Human	View/Edit Mouse

Alpha-ketoglutarate dehydrogenase also known as 2-oxoglutarate dehydrogenase E1 component, mitochondrial is an enzyme that in humans is encoded by the OGDH gene.

== Structure ==
=== Gene ===
The OGDH gene is located on the 7th chromosome, with the specific location being 7p14-p13. There are 26 exons located within the gene.

=== Protein ===
This gene encodes a subunit that catalyzes the oxidative decarboxylation of alpha-ketoglutarate to Succinyl-CoA at its active site in the fourth step of the citric acid cycle by acting as a base to facilitate the decarboxylation. The main residues responsible for the catalysis are thought to be His 260, Phe 227, Gln685, His 729, Ser302, and His 298.

== Function ==
This gene encodes one subunit of the 2-oxoglutarate dehydrogenase complex. This complex catalyzes the overall conversion of 2-oxoglutarate (alpha-ketoglutarate) to succinyl-CoA and CO_{2} during the citric acid cycle. The protein is located in the mitochondrial matrix and uses thiamine pyrophosphate as a cofactor. The overall complex furthers catalysis by keeping the necessary substrates for the reaction close within the enzyme, thus creating a situation in which it is more likely that the substrate will be in the favorable conformation and orientation. This enzyme is also part of a larger multienzyme complex that channels the intermediates in the catalysis between subunits of the complex thus minimizing unwanted side reactions. Not only do the subunits ferry products back and forth, but each of the subunits in the E1o homodimer are connected via a cavity lined with acidic residues, thus increasing the dimer's ability to act as a base. The orientation of the cavity allows for direct transfer of the intermediate to the E2o subunit.

=== Mechanism ===
The protein encoded by OGDH is thought to have a single active site. The enzyme also requires two cofactors in order for it to function properly, Thiamine diphosphate and a divalent magnesium ion. The specific mechanism of the subunit is currently unknown; however, there are several theories as to how it functions, among them is the Hexa Uni Ping Pong theory. Even though the mechanism isn't fully known the kinetic data have been calculated and are as follows: the Km is 0.14 ± 0.04 mM, and the Vmax is 9 ± 3 μmol/(min*mg).

=== Regulation ===
This subunit, known as E1o, catalyzes a rate-limiting step in the citric acid cycle and lies far from equilibrium; the total change in Gibbs free energy is ΔG = −33 kJ/mol. The significant energy change makes it a crucial point of regulation not only for the citric acid cycle, but also for the entire cellular respiration pathway. As such, E1o is inhibited by both NADH and Succinyl-CoA via non competitive feedback inhibition.

== Clinical significance ==
A congenital deficiency in 2-oxoglutarate dehydrogenase activity is believed to lead to hypotonia, metabolic acidosis, and hyperlactatemia. It is characterized by the buildup of a chemical called lactic acid in the body and a variety of neurological problems. Signs and symptoms of this condition usually first appear shortly after birth, and they can vary widely among affected individuals. The most common feature is a potentially life-threatening buildup of lactic acid (lactic acidosis), which can cause nausea, vomiting, severe breathing problems, and an abnormal heartbeat. People with pyruvate dehydrogenase deficiency usually have neurological problems as well. Most have delayed development of mental abilities and motor skills such as sitting and walking. Other neurological problems can include intellectual disability, seizures, weak muscle tone (hypotonia), poor coordination, and difficulty walking. Some affected individuals have abnormal brain structures, such as underdevelopment of the tissue connecting the left and right halves of the brain (corpus callosum), wasting away (atrophy) of the exterior part of the brain known as the cerebral cortex, or patches of damaged tissue (lesions) on some parts of the brain. Because of the severe health effects, many individuals with pyruvate dehydrogenase deficiency do not survive past childhood, although some may live into adolescence or adulthood.

== Interactive pathway map ==
Click on genes, proteins and metabolites below to link to respective articles. (Note: The interactive pathway map can be edited at WikiPathways: "TCACycle_WP78".)

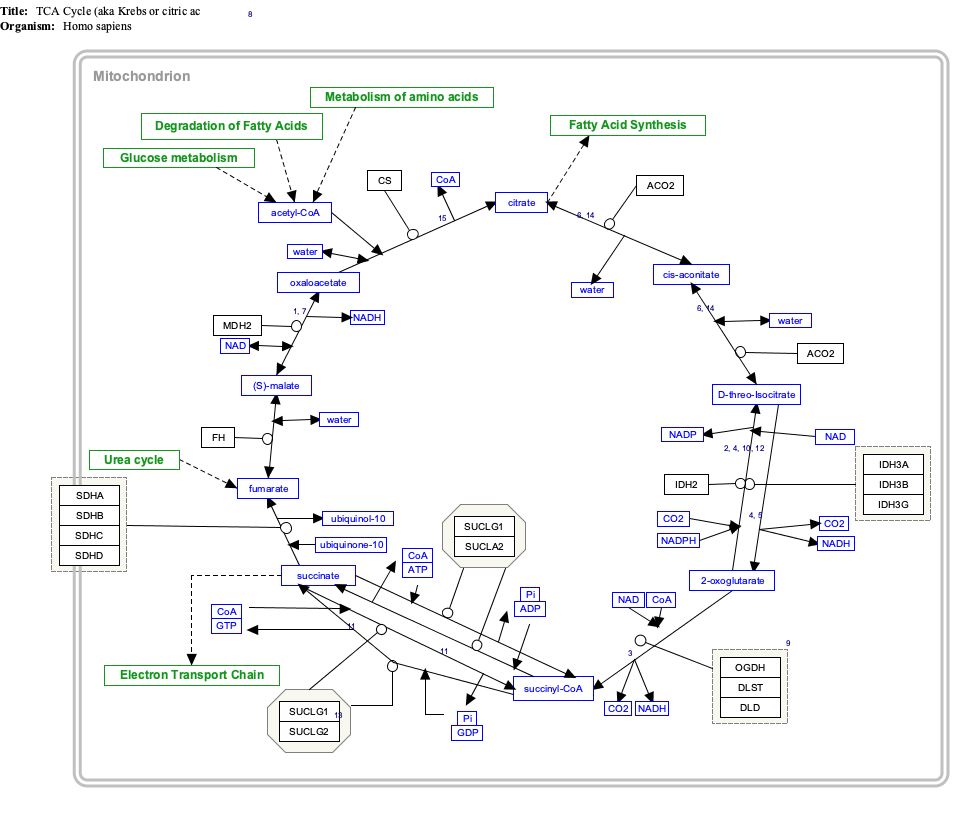

TCACycle_WP78 edit
