= Allysine =

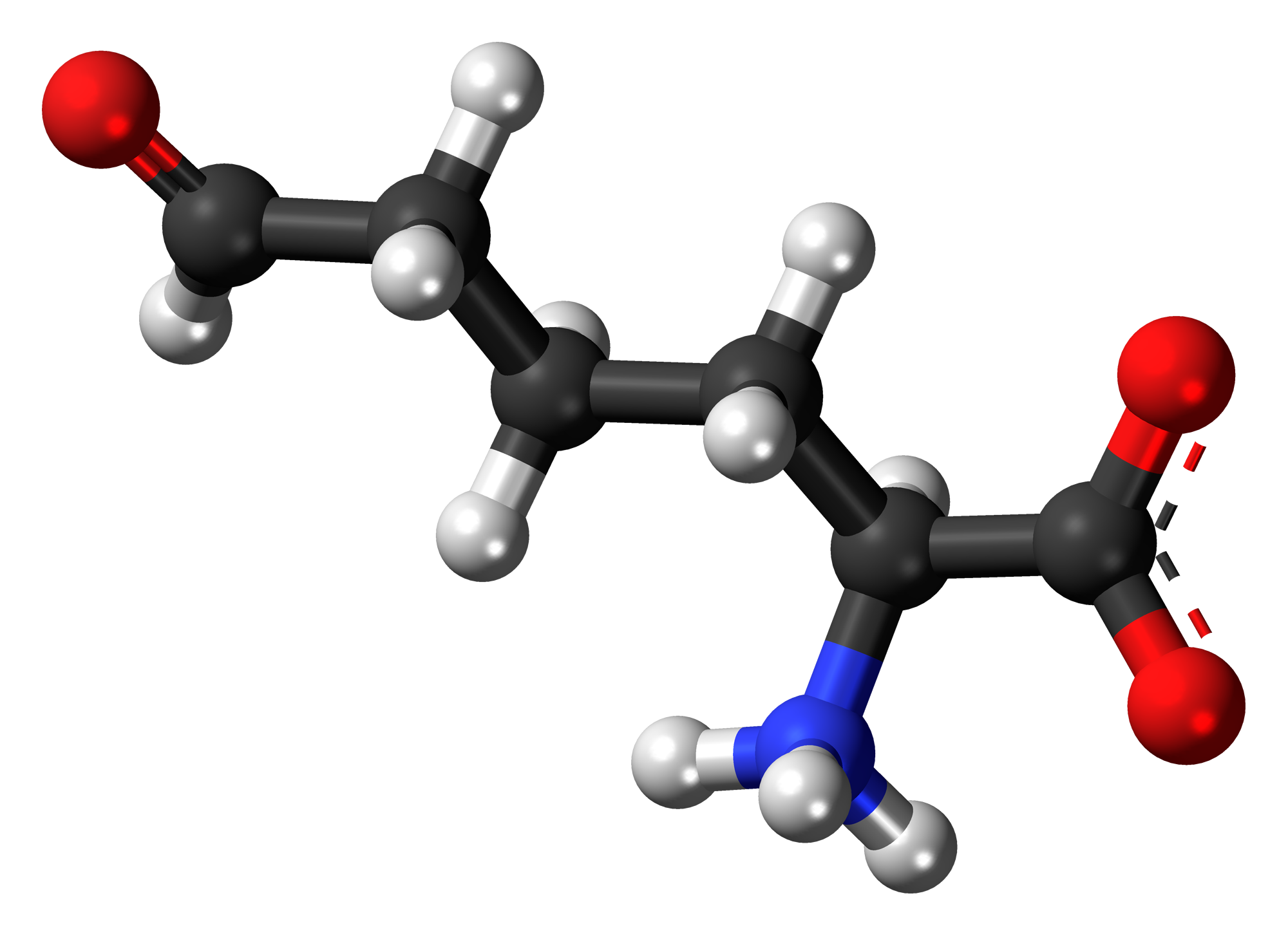

Names
- Preferred IUPAC name (2S)-2-Amino-6-oxohexanoic acid
- Other names 2-aminoadipate semialdehyde, 2-amino-5-formylvaleric acid, norvaline, 6-oxo-DL-norleucine

Identifiers
CAS Number	1962-83-0
3D model (JSmol)	Interactive image; Interactive image
ChEBI	CHEBI:57988
ChemSpider	202
KEGG	C04076
MeSH	allysine
PubChem CID	207
UNII	425I4Y24YZ
CompTox Dashboard (EPA)	DTXSID00862802
- InChI: InChI=1S/C6H11NO3/c7-5(6(9)10)3-1-2-4-8/h4-5H,1-3,7H2,(H,9,10) Key: GFXYTQPNNXGICT-UHFFFAOYSA-N
- SMILES: O=CCCC[C@H](N)C(=O)O; O=CCCCC(N)C(=O)O

Properties
Chemical formula	C_{6}H_{11}NO_{3}
Molar mass	145.158 g·mol^{−1}
Appearance	unstable
Density	1.74g/cm^{3}
Boiling point	295.2 °C (563.4 °F; 568.3 K)

Hazards
Flash point	132.3 °C (270.1 °F; 405.4 K)
- Except where otherwise noted, data are given for materials in their standard state (at 25 °C [77 °F], 100 kPa). Infobox references

Allysine is a derivative of lysine that features a formyl group in place of the terminal amine. The free amino acid does not exist, but the allysine residue does. It is produced by aerobic oxidation of lysine residues by the enzyme lysyl oxidase. The transformation is an example of a post-translational modification. The semialdehyde form exists in equilibrium with a cyclic derivative.

Conversion of lysine residue to allysine residue.

== Biochemical reactions ==
Allysine is linked to L-lysine in reactions catalysed by saccharopine dehydrogenases. These interconvert them via saccharopine:

L-lysine
+
α-Ketoglutaric acid
Saccharopine
L-glutamic acid
+
L-allysine

Allysine is involved in the production of elastin and collagen. Increased allysine concentration in tissues has been correlated to the presence of fibrosis.

Allysine residues react with sodium 2-naphthol-6-sulfonate to produce a fluorescent bis-naphtol-allysine product. In another assay, allysine-containing proteins are reduced with sodium borohydride to give a peptide containing the 6-hydroxynorleucine (6-hydroxy-2-aminocaproic acid) residue, which (unlike allysine) is stable to proteolysis.
