= DLST =

Protein-coding gene in the species Homo sapiens

Identifiers
- Aliases: DLST, DLTS, dihydrolipoamide S-succinyltransferase, PGL7, KGD2
- External IDs: OMIM: 126063; MGI: 1926170; GeneCards: DLST
Enzyme activity
EC #	BRENDA	ExPASy	KEGG	MetaCyc
2.3.1.61	↗	↗	↗	↗

Gene location (Human)
Chr.	Chromosome 14 (human)
Band	14q24.3	Start	74,881,891 bp
Band	14q24.3	End	74,903,743 bp

Gene location (Mouse)
Chr.	Chromosome 12 (mouse)
Band	12|12 D1	Start	85,157,607 bp
Band	12|12 D1	End	85,181,619 bp
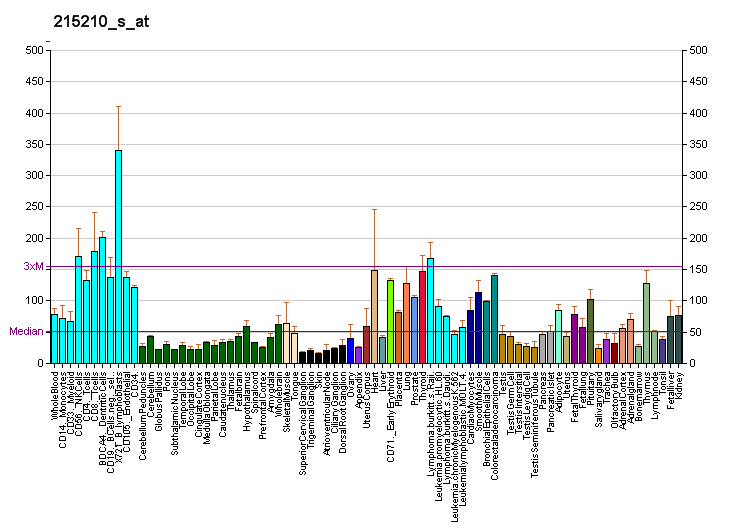
RNA expression pattern
Bgee	Human / Mouse (ortholog); Top expressed in: apex of heart; right adrenal cortex; left ventricle; gastrocnemius muscle; left adrenal gland; left adrenal cortex; right auricle of heart; secondary oocyte; muscle of thigh; skin of leg / Top expressed in: right ventricle; muscle of thigh; digastric muscle; myocardium of ventricle; thoracic diaphragm; brown adipose tissue; right kidney; soleus muscle; cardiac muscles; sternocleidomastoid muscle; More reference expression data
BioGPS	More reference expression data
Gene ontology
Molecular function	transferase activity; dihydrolipoyllysine-residue succinyltransferase activity; acyltransferase activity; protein binding
Cellular component	oxoglutarate dehydrogenase complex; membrane; myelin sheath; mitochondrial matrix; mitochondrion; extracellular exosome; nucleus
Biological process	tricarboxylic acid cycle; lysine catabolic process; generation of precursor metabolites and energy; L-lysine catabolic process to acetyl-CoA via saccharopine; metabolism; cellular nitrogen compound metabolic process; 2-oxoglutarate metabolic process; succinyl-CoA metabolic process; histone succinylation
Sources:Amigo / QuickGO
Orthologs
Databases	NCBI: entry; OMA: entry
Species	Human	Mouse
Entrez	1743	78920
Ensembl	ENSG00000119689	ENSMUSG00000004789
UniProt	P36957	Q9D2G2
RefSeq (mRNA)	NM_001244883; NM_001933	NM_030225
RefSeq (protein)	NP_001231812; NP_001924	NP_084501
Location (UCSC)	Chr 14: 74.88 – 74.9 Mb	Chr 12: 85.16 – 85.18 Mb
PubMed search
- Wikidata
View/Edit Human	View/Edit Mouse

Dihydrolipoyllysine-residue succinyltransferase component of 2-oxoglutarate dehydrogenase complex, mitochondrial is an enzyme that in humans is encoded by the DLST gene.

== Interactive pathway map ==
Click on genes, proteins and metabolites below to link to respective articles. (Note: The interactive pathway map can be edited at WikiPathways: "TCACycle_WP78".)

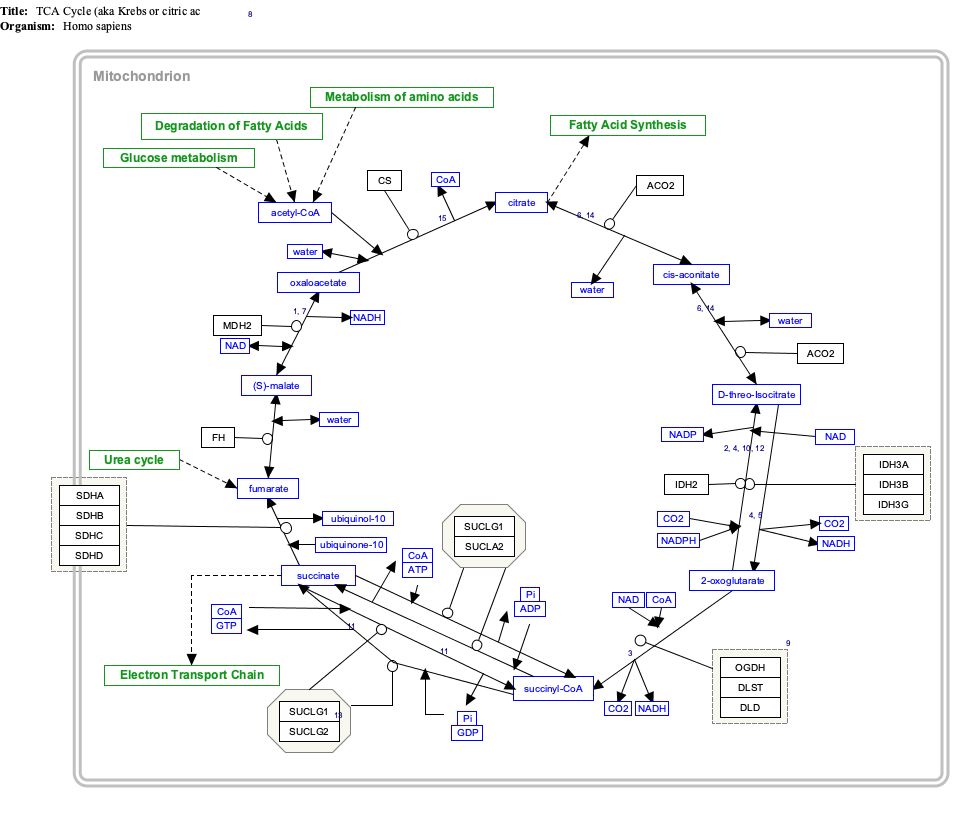

TCACycle_WP78 edit
