= Ferredoxin—NAD(+) reductase =

Ferredoxin-NAD+ reductase

Identifiers
- EC no.: 1.18.1.3
- CAS no.: 39369-37-4

Databases
- IntEnz: IntEnz view
- BRENDA: BRENDA entry
- ExPASy: NiceZyme view
- KEGG: KEGG entry
- MetaCyc: metabolic pathway
- PRIAM: profile
- PDB structures: RCSB PDB PDBe PDBsum
- Gene Ontology: AmiGO / QuickGO
Search
- PMC: articles
- PubMed: articles
- NCBI: proteins

In enzymology, a ferredoxin–NAD^{+} reductase (EC 1.18.1.3) is an enzyme that catalyzes the chemical reaction:

reduced ferredoxin + NAD^{+} $\rightleftharpoons$ oxidized ferredoxin + NADH + H^{+}

Thus, the two substrates of this enzyme are reduced ferredoxin and NAD^{+}, whereas its 3 products are oxidized ferredoxin, NADH, and H^{+}. This enzyme participates in fatty acid metabolism.

This enzyme belongs to the family of oxidoreductases, specifically those acting on iron-sulfur proteins as donor with NAD+ or NADP+ as acceptor.

The systematic name of this enzyme is ferredoxin:NAD^{+} oxidoreductase. There are a variety of names in common use:

- ferredoxin–nicotinamide adenine dinucleotide reductase
- ferredoxin reductase
- NAD^{+}-ferredoxin reductase
- ferredoxin–NAD^{+} reductase
- ferredoxin–linked NAD^{+} reductase
- ferredoxin–NAD reductase

When NAD molecule is in its reduced form, the enzyme is referred to as:

- NADH-ferredoxin oxidoreductase
- reduced nicotinamide adenine dinucleotide-ferredoxin
- NADH-ferredoxin reductase
- NADH flavodoxin oxidoreductase
- NADH_{2}-ferredoxin oxidoreductase

Other enzymes in the family include:

- NADH-ferredoxin NAP reductase (component of naphthalene dioxygenase multicomponent enzyme system)
- NADH-ferredoxin TOL reductase (component of toluene dioxygenase)

== Structural studies ==
As of late 2007, only one structure has been solved for this class of enzymes, with the PDB accession code 1KRH.
