= Saccharopine =

- Stereo, skeletal formula of saccharopine ((2S)-2-{[(5S)-5-aminopentyl]amino})

Names
- IUPAC name 2-[(5-Amino-5-carboxypentyl)amino]pentanedioic acid

Identifiers
CAS Number	997-68-2
3D model (JSmol)	Interactive image
ChEBI	CHEBI:16927
ChemSpider	141086
DrugBank	DB04207
KEGG	C00449
MeSH	saccharopine
PubChem CID	160556
UNII	WBQ73O8W32
CompTox Dashboard (EPA)	DTXSID80862507
- InChI: InChI=1S/C11H20N2O6/c12-7(10(16)17)3-1-2-6-13-8(11(18)19)4-5-9(14)15/h7-8,13H,1-6,12H2,(H,14,15)(H,16,17)(H,18,19) Key: ZDGJAHTZVHVLOT-UHFFFAOYSA-N
- SMILES: NC(CCCCNC(CCC(=O)O)C(=O)O)C(=O)O

Properties
Chemical formula	C_{11}H_{20}N_{2}O_{6}
Molar mass	276.289 g·mol^{−1}

Related compounds
Related alkanoic acids	4-(γ-Glutamylamino)butanoic acid; Hypusine
Related compounds	Palmitoylethanolamide
- Except where otherwise noted, data are given for materials in their standard state (at 25 °C [77 °F], 100 kPa). Infobox references

Saccharopine is an intermediate in the metabolism of amino acid lysine. It is a precursor of lysine in the alpha-aminoadipate pathway which occurs in fungi and euglenids. In mammals and seed plants saccharopine is an intermediate in the degradation of lysine, formed by condensation of lysine and alpha-ketoglutarate.

== Biochemical reactions ==
The reactions involved, catalysed by saccharopine dehydrogenases, are:

L-lysine
+
α-Ketoglutaric acid
Saccharopine
L-glutamic acid
+
L-allysine

== Pathology ==
Saccharopinuria (high amounts of saccharopine in the urine) and saccharopinemia (an excess of saccharopine in the blood) are conditions present in some inherited disorders of lysine degradation.

== History ==
Saccharopine was first isolated in 1961 from baker's yeast (Saccharomyces cerevisiae, hence the name) by Darling and Larsen.

== See also ==
- Opines
