= Hydroxylysine =

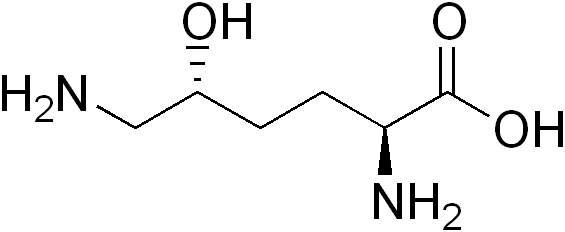

Names
- IUPAC name (5R)-5-Hydroxy-L-lysine
- Systematic IUPAC name (2S,5R)-2,6-Diamino-5-hydroxyhexanoic acid
- Other names: 5-Hydroxy-L-lysine; α,ɛ-Diamino-δ-hydroxycaproic acid

Identifiers
CAS Number	1190-94-9
3D model (JSmol)	Interactive image
ChemSpider	2297721
ECHA InfoCard	100.013.388
KEGG	C16741
MeSH	Hydroxylysine
PubChem CID	3032849
UNII	2GQB349IUB
CompTox Dashboard (EPA)	DTXSID701317083
- InChI: InChI=1S/C6H14N2O3/c7-3-4(9)1-2-5(8)6(10)11/h4-5,9H,1-3,7-8H2,(H,10,11)/t4-,5+/m1/s1 Key: YSMODUONRAFBET-UHNVWZDZSA-N
- SMILES: C(C[C@@H](C(=O)O)N)[C@H](CN)O

Properties
Chemical formula	C_{6}H_{14}N_{2}O_{3}
Molar mass	162.189 g·mol^{−1}
- Except where otherwise noted, data are given for materials in their standard state (at 25 °C [77 °F], 100 kPa). verify (what is ?) Infobox references

Hydroxylysine (Hyl) is an amino acid with the molecular formula C_{6}H_{14}N_{2}O_{3}. It was first discovered in 1921 by Donald Van Slyke as the 5-hydroxylysine form. It arises from a post-translational hydroxy modification of lysine. It is most widely known as a component of collagen.

It is biosynthesized from lysine via oxidation by lysyl hydroxylase enzymes. The most common form is the (5R) stereoisomer found in collagen. However, the enzyme JMJD6 has recently been shown to be a lysyl hydroxylase which modifies an RNA splicing factor producing the (5S) stereoisomer. Additionally, in E. coli, there has been at least one lysine N-hydroxylase enzyme identified, named IucD.
