= Small nucleolar RNA snoR9 plant =

Small nucleolar RNA snoR9
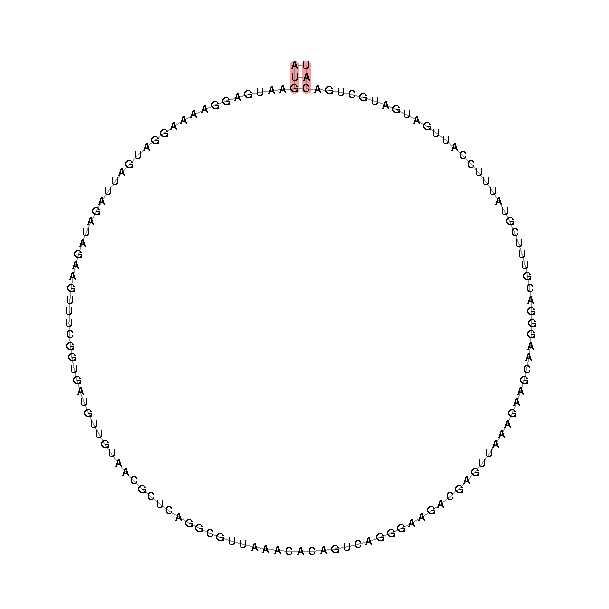

Identifiers
- Symbol: snoR9_plant
- Rfam: RF00348

Other data
- RNA type: Gene; snRNA; guide; CD-box;
- PDB structures: PDBe

In molecular biology, snoR9 is a non-coding RNA (ncRNA) which functions in the biogenesis (modification) of other small nuclear RNAs (snRNAs). It is known as a small nucleolar RNA (snoRNA) and also often referred to as a 'guide RNA'.

R9 is a member of the C/D box class of snoRNAs which contain the conserved sequence motifs known as the C box (UGAUGA) and the D box (CUGA). Most of the members of the box C/D family function in directing site-specific 2'-O-methylation of substrate RNAs.

This plant snoRNA was identified in Arabidopsis thaliana by computational screening and experimentally verified by primer extension analysis. This snoRNA is not related to the snoRNA identified in hyperthermophiles also called snoR9.
