= Small nucleolar RNA snoR9 =

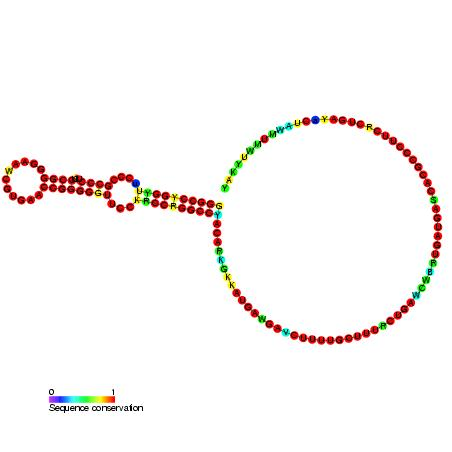
- Predicted secondary structure and sequence conservation of snoR9

Identifiers
- Symbol: snoR9
- Rfam: RF00065

Other data
- RNA type: Gene; snRNA; snoRNA; CD-box
- Domain: Archaea
- GO: GO:0006396 GO:0005730
- SO: SO:0000593
- PDB structures: PDBe

snoR9 is a non-coding RNA (ncRNA) which functions in the biogenesis (modification) of other small nuclear RNAs (snRNAs). It is known as a small nucleolar RNA (snoRNA) and also often referred to as a 'guide RNA'.

R9 is a member of the C/D box class of snoRNAs which contain the conserved sequence motifs known as the C box (UGAUGA) and the D box (CUGA). Most of the members of the box C/D family function in directing site-specific 2'-O-methylation of substrate RNAs.

This snoRNA was identified in a computational search for GC-rich regions in the AT-rich genomes of hyperthermophiles. This snoRNA is not related to the plant snoRNA snoR9.
