= Thiobacillus =

Scientific classification
- Domain: Bacteria
- Kingdom: Pseudomonadati
- Phylum: Pseudomonadota
- Class: Betaproteobacteria
- Order: Nitrosomonadales
- Family: Thiobacillacaeae
- Genus: Thiobacillus; Beijerinck 1904 (Approved Lists 1980)

Species
- Thiobacillus denitrificans Thiobacillus thioparus Thiobacillus thiophilus

Genus of bacteria

Thiobacillus is a genus of Gram-negative Betaproteobacteria. Thiobacillus thioparus is the type species of the genus, and the type strain thereof is the Starkey^{T} strain, isolated by Robert Starkey in the 1930s from a field at Rutgers University in the United States of America. While over 30 "species" have been named in this genus since it was defined by Martinus Beijerinck in 1904, (the first strain was observed by the biological oceanographer Alexander Nathansohn in 1902 - likely what we would now call Halothiobacillus neapolitanus), most names were never validly or effectively published. The remainder were either reclassified into Paracoccus, Starkeya (both in the Alphaproteobacteria); Sulfuriferula, Annwoodia, Thiomonas (in the Betaproteobacteria); Halothiobacillus, Guyparkeria (in the Gammaproteobacteria), or Thermithiobacillus or Acidithiobacillus (in the Acidithiobacillia). The very loosely defined "species" Thiobacillus trautweinii was where sulfur oxidising heterotrophs and chemolithoheterotrophs were assigned in the 1910-1960s era, most of which were probably Pseudomonas species. Many species named in this genus were never deposited in service collections and have been lost.

All species are obligate autotrophs (using the transaldolase form of the Calvin-Benson-Bassham cycle) using elementary sulfur, thiosulfate, or polythionates as energy sources - the former Thiobacillus aquaesulis can grow weakly on complex media as a heterotroph, but has been reclassified to Annwoodia aquaesulis. Some strains (E6 and Tk-m) of the type species Thiobacillus thioparus can use the sulfur from dimethylsulfide, dimethyldisulfide, or carbon disulfide to support autotrophic growth - they oxidise the carbon from these species into carbon dioxide and assimilate it. Sulfur oxidation is achieved via the Kelly-Trudinger pathway.

== Reclassifications ==
As a result of 16S ribosomal RNA sequence analysis, many members of Thiobacillus have been reassigned.

- Thiobacillus versutus to Paracoccus
- Thiobacillus acidophilus to Acidiphilium
- Thiobacillus intermedius, Thiobacillus perometabolis, Thiobacillus thermosulfatus, and Thiobacilus cuprinus to Thiomonas
- Thiobacillus thiooxidans, Thiobacillus ferrooxidans, Thiobacillus caldus, and Thiobacillus albertensis to Acidithiobacillus
- Thiobacillus aquaesulis to Annwoodia aquaesulis.
- Thiobacillus neapolitanus to Halothiobacillus
- Thiobacillus thyasiris to Thiomicrospira thyasirae
- Thiobacillus hydrothermalis and Thiobacillus halophilus firstly to Halothiobacillus and later to Guyparkeria
- Thiobacillus tepidarius to Thermithiobacillus
