= Ann P. Wood =

Microbiologist

Ann Wood
- Born: 1952; Yorkshire, UK
- Education: Queen Elizabeth College
- Scientific career
- Workplaces: University of Warwick, King's College London
- Thesis: Heterotrophic growth and metabolism of the facultative autotroph Thiobacillus A2 (1977)
- Academic advisors: Donovan Kelly

Ann Patricia Wood (born 1952) is a retired British biochemist and bacteriologist who specialized in the ecology, taxonomy and physiology of sulfur-oxidizing chemolithoautotrophic bacteria and how methylotrophic bacteria play a role in the degradation of odour causing compounds in the human mouth, vagina and skin. The bacterial genus Annwoodia was named to honor her contributions to microbial research in 2017.

== Education and career ==
Wood earned her Ph.D. in 1977 from Queen Elizabeth College working on the growth of Paracoccus versutus strain A2 (then "Thiobacillus sp. A2"). Wood worked at the University of Warwick from the mid-1970s until the late 1980s and then King's College London as a Lecturer and Senior Lecturer from June 1991 to August 2015 when she retired. Wood was a member of the editorial board of Archives of Microbiology.

== Research ==
Wood's post-2000 work is associated with odours in the mouth, work that was covered in the popular press. She has also examined the link between odours in the feet, as well as the bacteria in bacterial vaginosis and periodontitis. She has also investigated the presence and role of methylotrophic bacteria in the natural world, including as symbionts of Thyasira flexuosa Montagu and living in association with Tagetes erecta L. These natural settings have included such places as the River Thames, thermal sulfur springs, and in Antarctica. Beyond studying the presence and effect of methylotrophs and sulfur oxidizing bacteria, she looked at their metabolism, taxonomy and diversity/

Wood's research on microbial use of one-carbon organic compounds that contain sulfur was reviewedin a 2018 publication, which named two metabolic pathways after Wood: the Padden-Wood pathway based on work with Xanthobacter tagetidis, an organism able to grow on substituted thiophenes, and the Borodonia-Wood pathway based on microbial growth on dimethylsulfone and dimethylsulfide in Hyphomicrobium sulfonivorans.

== Taxa named by Wood ==
The genera Acidithiobacillus and Thermithiobacillus of the class Acidithiobacillia, Halothiobacillus of the class Gammaproteobacteria and Starkeya of the Alphaproteobacteria, all in the phylum Pseudomonadota

The species Annwoodia aquaesulis (originally Thiobacillus aquaesulis) of the Betaproteobacteria; the species Methylorubrum podarium (originally Methylobacterium podarium), Methylorubrum thiocyanatum (originally Methylobacterium thiocyanatum), Hyphomicrobium sulfonivorans and Xanthobacter tagetidis of the Alphaproteobacteria; the species Guyparkeria halophila (originally Thiobacillus halophilus and later Halothiobacillus halophilus) of the Gammaproteobacteria, all in the phylum Pseudomonadota. The species Pseudarthrobacter sulfonivorans (originally Arthobacter sulfonivorans) and Arthrobacter methylotrophus of the Actinomycetota in the phylum Actinomycetota.

== Selected publications ==
- Beller, Harry R.; Chain, Patrick S. G.; Letain, Tracy E.; Chakicherla, Anu; Larimer, Frank W.; Richardson, Paul M.; Coleman, Matthew A.; Wood, Ann P.; Kelly, Donovan P. (15 February 2006). "The Genome Sequence of the Obligately Chemolithoautotrophic, Facultatively Anaerobic Bacterium Thiobacillus denitrificans". Journal of Bacteriology. 188 (4): 1473–1488. doi:10.1128/JB.188.4.1473-1488.2006. ISSN 0021-9193. PMC 1367237. PMID 16452431.
- Kelly, Donovan P.; Shergill, Jasvinder K.; Lu, Wei-Ping; Wood, Ann P. (1997). "Oxidative metabolism of inorganic sulfur compounds by bacteria". Antonie van Leeuwenhoek. 71 (1/2): 95–107. doi:10.1023/A:1000135707181. PMID 9049021. S2CID 2057300.
- Wood, Ann P.; Aurikko, Jukka P.; Kelly, Donovan P. (2004). "A challenge for 21st century molecular biology and biochemistry: what are the causes of obligate autotrophy and methanotrophy?". FEMS Microbiology Reviews. 28 (3): 335–352. doi:10.1016/j.femsre.2003.12.001. ISSN 1574-6976. PMID 15449607. S2CID 18575374.
- Kelly, D P; Wood, A P (2000). "Reclassification of some species of Thiobacillus to the newly designated genera Acidithiobacillus gen. nov., Halothiobacillus gen. nov. and Thermithiobacillus gen. nov". International Journal of Systematic and Evolutionary Microbiology. 50 (2): 511–516. doi:10.1099/00207713-50-2-511. ISSN 1466-5034. PMID 10758854.

== Honors and awards ==
In 2017, the bacterial genus Annwoodia was named in honor of the contributions made by Wood, including her description of the type species Annwoodia aquaesulis, originally described as a member of the genus Thiobacillus, and her "significant contributions to the taxonomy of the ‘sulfur bacteria’ and methylotrophic "Proteobacteria" [now Pseudomonadota], their physiology and ecology".
