= Annwoodia =

Scientific classification
- Domain: Bacteria
- Kingdom: Pseudomonadati
- Phylum: Pseudomonadota
- Class: Betaproteobacteria
- Order: Nitrosomonadales
- Family: Thiobacillacaeae
- Genus: Annwoodia; Boden et al. 2017
- Species: A. aquaesulis

Binomial name
- Annwoodia aquaesulis (Wood and Kelly 1995) Boden et al. 2017

Genus of bacteria

The genus Annwoodia was named in 2017 to circumscribe an organism previously described as a member of the genus Thiobacillus, Thiobacillus aquaesulis - the type and only species is Annwoodia aquaesulis, which was isolated from the geothermal waters of the Roman Baths in the city of Bath in the United Kingdom by Ann P. Wood and Donovan P. Kelly of the University of Warwick - the genus was subsequently named to honour Wood's contribution to microbiology. The genus falls within the family Thiobacillaceae along with Thiobacillus and Sulfuritortus, both of which comprise autotrophic organisms dependent on thiosulfate, other sulfur oxyanions and sulfide as electron donors for chemolithoheterotrophic growth. Whilst Annwoodia spp. and Sulfuritortus spp. are thermophilic, Thiobacillus spp. are mesophilic.

A. aquaesulis is moderately thermophilic with an optimum temperature of 43 °C and a temperature range of 30 °C to 55 °C - a similar temperature profile to the related genus Sulfuritortus - and is a facultative chemolithoautotroph that grows on reduced sulfur oxyanions such as thiosulfate as the electron donor and carbon dioxide or bicarbonate as the carbon source. Unlike Thiobacillus spp., Annwoodia spp. do not produce tetrathionate during growth on thiosulfate and can also grow heterotrophically on nutrient broth. Elementary sulfur is deposited by the organism in batch culture with thiosulfate as the electron donor, but not in chemostat culture. A. aquaesulis can use nitrate as a terminal electron acceptor, as well as molecular oxygen. The dominant respiratory quinone is ubiquinone-8 and the G+C fraction of the type strain of the type species is 67.5 mol%. All members of the genus produce volutin (polyphosphate) granules but not capsules or endospores. A. aquaesulis has a pH optimum of 7.5-8.0 and pH range of 7.0 to 9.0. Whilst nutrient broth and yeast extract will support heterotrophic growth, simple carbon compounds and ions such as sugars, organic acids, formate and monomethylamine do not support growth. Ammonium is the only source of nitrogen.

Annwoodia aquaesulis strains have been detected in mixed-population packed-bed reactors containing limestone as a source of carbon, elementary sulfur as the electron donor and nitrate as the terminal electron acceptor, as well as in karstic sulfidic thermal groundwater ecosystems of broad similarity to those from which the type strain was isolated

Annwoodia aquaesulis grown on thiosulfate, tetrathionate or trithionate has high growth yields, which are broadly similar to those of Thermithiobacillus spp., and are higher than members of the closely related genus Thiobacillus, indicating core metabolic differences. This high yield was observed in spite of 70% more carbon dioxide being fixed than could be accounted for as biomass, indicating the excretion of a carbon intermediate, which is not observed in Thermithiobacillus tepidarius, which was isolated from the same location at the Roman Baths in Bath, also by enrichment culture on thiosulfate as the sole electron donor and molecular oxygen as the terminal electron acceptor.
