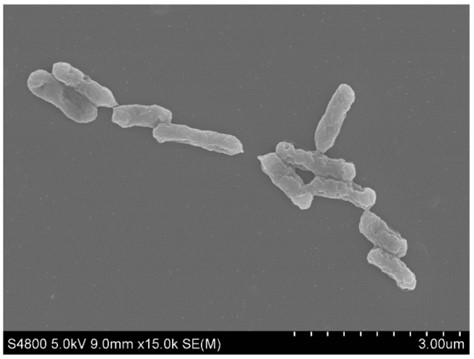
- An image of "Acidithiobacillus ferrooxidans"

Scientific classification
- Domain: Bacteria
- Kingdom: Pseudomonadati
- Phylum: Pseudomonadota
- Class: Acidithiobacillia
- Order: Acidithiobacillales
- Family: Acidithiobacillaceae
- Genus: Acidithiobacillus
- Species: A. ferrooxidans

Binomial name
- Acidithiobacillus ferrooxidans (Temple and Colmer 1951) Kelly and Wood 2000

Synonyms
- Thiobacillus ferrooxidans

= Acidithiobacillus ferrooxidans =

Species of bacterium

Acidithiobacillus ferrooxidans is a chemolithoautotrophic (uses inorganic chemicals for energy and makes its own organic molecules from carbon dioxide), non-spore forming, Gram-negative organism that resides in extremely acidic environments. It is relatively short in size, measuring 0.4 μ by 0.8 μ, and can appear as single cells or in pairs. The bacterium gained attention for its unique ability to oxidize ferrous iron for energy and capacity to thrive in nutrient poor environments abundant in heavy metals, conditions that are typically aversive to most other microorganisms.

== Etymology ==
The genus name of the bacteria, Acidithiobacillus, contains Latin and Greek roots. It can be broken up into three words consisting of acidus (meaning “acidic”), thios (meaning “sulfur”), and bacillus (meaning “rod”), which highlight the rod-shaped organism's affinity for acid and ability to oxidize sulfur. The species name of the bacteria, ferrooxidans, comes from the Latin word ferrum (meaning “iron”) and oxidare (meaning “to oxidize”), characterizing its distinct ability to oxidize ferrous iron.

== Taxonomic hierarchy ==
Acidithiobacillus ferrooxidans is classified within the domain Bacteria, kingdom Pseudomonadati, phylum Pseudomonadota, class Acidithiobacilla, order Acidithiobacillales, family Acidithiobacillaceae, and genus Acidithiobacillus. There are currently 8 identified species within the Acidithiobacillus genus, with A. ferrooxidans serving as one of the most well-studied amongst the known species.

== Phylogenetic relationships ==
Acidithiobacillus ferrooxidans is most closely related to other iron and sulfur-oxidizing species within the Acidithiobacillus genus, including Acidithiobacillus caldus, Acidithiobacillus thiooxidans, and Acidithiobacillus ferrivorans. The species listed were organized into distinct clades to represent major evolutionary branches by comparing their 16S rRNA gene sequences — a gene sequence commonly used to study evolutionary relationships due to their presence in all bacteria and slow mutation rate. The genomes for the species were obtained from a publicly available database of nucleotide sequences.

== Discovery process ==
The bacterium, Acidithiobacillus ferrooxidans, and its ability to oxidize ferrous iron was first reported by Colmer and Hinkle in 1947. Soon after, it was found repeatedly in various acid mine drainages across the United States, including the Pittsburgh, the Sewickley, and the Upper Freeport.

Isolation

To isolate the organism, Colmer and Hinkle incubated 50 mL of acidic mine drainage in sterile flasks at room temperature until turbidity developed, indicating microbial growth. They performed successive transfers by subculturing precipitate from the side of the flask into fresh acidic medium multiple times in an attempt to enrich or amplify the iron-oxidizing populations. Following the transfers, Colmer and Hinkle prepared streak plates on acid mine water agar, made from filtered acid mine drainage water and agar, to yield pure colonies. This process leveraged the bacterium's natural environment to induce selective growth, a process that promotes the growth of a specific bacteria while limiting others.

Characterization

Using bacteria sourced from the acid mine drainages in the Pittsburgh seam, Colmer, Temple, and Hinkle attempted to reveal the morphological and physiological characteristics of the organism by incubating it in various environments: liquid and solid media containing water from the three different mines, artificial mine water, and sodium thiosulfate. The bacterium exhibited autotrophic behavior in mediums containing thiosulfate meaning it was able to use sulfur as an energy source. It also lowered the pH of the environment due to the production of sulfuric acid as a byproduct of sulfur oxidation. These traits caused the organism to initially be grouped into the Thiobacillus genus. Its ability to efficiently oxidize iron then gave rise to the species name: Thiobacillus ferrooxidans.

Reclassification

In 2000, the bacterium was reassigned to the Acidithiobacillus genus based on information obtained from 16S rRNA gene sequence analysis. Phylogenetic studies revealed that the organism was genetically distinct from other well-studied species within the Thiobacillus genus, forming a separate cluster and lineage with a few closely related species. In response, the genus Acidithiobacillus was created to reflect the shared physiological traits, such as iron and sulfur oxidation, as well as the additional acid-loving characteristic of these species.

== Metabolism ==
Acidithiobacillus ferrooxidans is classified as a chemolithoautotroph because it uses sulfur and iron as its primary energy sources. The bacteria contains two electron transport chains to help move electrons from sulfur or iron to generate energy in the form of ATP and NADH. A. ferrooxidans is adapted to survive in varying levels of carbon dioxide by encoding for several forms of RuBisCO, an enzyme involved in the first step of the Calvin Cycle. The Calvin Cycle is the process by which the bacterium fixes carbon dioxide into food, using energy derived from processing sulfur and iron. To sustain its metabolism in highly acidic and metal-rich environments, the bacterium possesses multiple stress response mechanisms. A. ferrooxidans has the ability to produce resistant biofilms which serve as protective clusters of bacteria and utilizes efflux pumps that pump out toxic heavy metal concentrations. Additionally, the organism contains enzymes such as reductases that help detoxify oxygen radicals and also genes of resistance against various heavy metals like copper, mercury, etc.

== Genome ==
Within Acidithiobacillus ferrooxidans is a circular chromosome, known as ATCC 23270, that contains around 3 million base pairs and over 3,000 protein-coding genes, more than half of which are composed of cytosine and guanine. Most of the functional genes within the chromosome are broadly coded for iron and sulfur oxidation, as well as stress response. This may be explained by the need to adapt to various low pH and stressful environments. While this specific strain was not shown to have any plasmid DNA, which is genetic material that exists separately from the main chromosome, other studies have shown over 27 different strains of A. ferrooxidans that exhibit significant genetic variation. As observed in Slowik et al. (2024), strains of A. ferrooxidans that do possess plasmid DNA have been found to express multiple hydrogenases and type c cytochromes which enhance their survivability by using various energy sources. Hydrogenases allow the organism to have an alternative source of energy, in addition to iron and sulfur, through the oxidation of hydrogen. Due to the role of type c cytochromes in the bacterium's chemolithoautotrophic metabolism and aerobic respiration, an increased number of these enzymes enhances electron transfer efficiency and provides redundancy, ensuring continued function even if some electron carriers are damaged.

== Ecology ==
Acidithiobacillus ferrooxidans is found within acidic and metal-rich environments, such as mining drainage systems, volcanic areas, and sulfur springs that other organisms would struggle to survive in. Within these environments, A. ferrooxidans uses sulfuric acid to oxidize iron causing the metal to lose an electron and mobilize various elements within its ecosystems. A. ferrooxidans excretes polymers, sticky sugar‑based molecules that form a protective slime, to build exopolymer-bound microbial communities which are tight‑knit bacterial clumps held together by a matrix. This is what allows the organism to concentrate ions and heavy metals like copper or zinc, in order to speed up mineral breakdown within its environment. Additionally, A. ferrooxidans can break down sulfides which are minerals containing sulfur bonded metals and also lower pH to significantly alter the chemical makeup of its environment. One study by Tonietti et al. (2024) highlights the “bioleaching versatility” of A. ferroxidans which describes its ability to extract a wide variety of metals out of ores using biological processes as opposed to high-temperature smelting. The industrial use of this organism within mining operations is further being discovered.

== Significance ==
Due to its unique bioleaching ability, Acidithiobacillus ferrooxidans can leverage its specialized metabolism to assist in the recycling of electronic waste, waste treatment, and more effective material gain from mining processes. The bacterium is able to perform its chemical processes at low temperatures and does not require the addition of large‑scale quantities of concentrated acids, bases, or other harsh reagents that are typical of normal metal leaching processes. As a result, A. ferrooxidans is able to leave a much smaller "environmental footprint" while increasing the amount of metal recovered from ore mining processes, sometimes extracting up to 95% copper from certain sources. The organism can also be utilized to recycle materials from electronic waste, such as used batteries. Studies have shown up to 98% extraction of silver from silver oxide-zinc battery cells with the use of A. ferrooxidans. Beyond the extracting value, A. ferrooxidans also aids in remediation of the environment and waste treatment by cleaning or neutralizing toxic metals in soil and water, which significantly reduces the costs of standard mining practices and global electronic waste. The organism is also considered a model for astrobiology studies due to its chemolithoautotrophic metabolism, which could sustain life in environments such as ancient Mars.
