= Snottite =

Microbial mat often found in caves

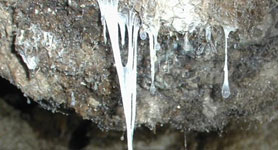
Snottites in Cueva de Villa Luz in Southern Mexico

Snottite, also snoticle, is a microbial mat of single-celled extremophilic bacteria which hang from the walls and ceilings of caves and are similar to small stalactites, but have the consistency of nasal mucus. In the Frasassi Caves in Italy, over 70% of cells in Snottite have been identified as Acidithiobacillus thiooxidans, with smaller populations including an archaeon in the uncultivated 'G-plasma' clade of Thermoplasmatales (>15%) and a bacterium in the Acidimicrobiaceae family (>5%).

The bacteria derive their energy from chemosynthesis of volcanic sulfur compounds including H_{2}S and warm-water solution dripping down from above, producing sulfuric acid. Because of this, their waste products are highly acidic (approaching pH=0), with similar properties to battery acid. Researchers at the University of Texas have suggested that this sulfuric acid may be a more significant cause of cave formation than the usual explanation offered of the carbonic acid formed from carbon dioxide dissolved in water.

Snottites were brought to attention by researchers Diana Northup and Penny Boston studying them (and other organisms) in a toxic sulfur cave called Cueva de Villa Luz (Cave of the Lighted House), in Tabasco, Mexico. Snottites were first discovered in this cave by Jim Pisarowicz who also coined the term.

The BBC series Wonders of the Solar System saw Professor Brian Cox examining snottites and positing that if there is life on Mars, it may be similarly primitive and hidden beneath the surface of the Red Planet.

== See also ==
- Archaea

== Additional sources ==
Hose L. D., Pisarowicz J. A. (1999) "Cueva de Villa Luz, Tabasco, Mexico: reconnaissance study of an active sulfur spring cave and ecosystem". J Cave Karst Studies; 61:13–21
