= Thiomonas bhubaneswarensis =

Scientific classification
- Domain: Bacteria
- Kingdom: Pseudomonadati
- Phylum: Pseudomonadota
- Class: Betaproteobacteria
- Order: Burkholderiales
- Family: Comamonadaceae
- Genus: Thiomonas
- Species: T. bhubaneswarensis

Binomial name
- Thiomonas bhubaneswarensis Panda et al. 2009

Type strain
- DSM 18181, JCM 14806, S10

Species of bacterium

Thiomonas bhubaneswarensis is a Gram-negative, oxidase- and catalase-positive, strictly aerobic, moderately thermophilic non-spore-forming, rod-shaped, motile bacterium with a single polar flagellum from the genus Thiomonas, which was isolated from hot-spring sediment samples in Atri in Bhubaneswar. T. bhubaneswarensis has the ability to oxidize thiosulfate.
