= Thiomonas cuprina =

Scientific classification
- Domain: Bacteria
- Kingdom: Pseudomonadati
- Phylum: Pseudomonadota
- Class: Betaproteobacteria
- Order: Burkholderiales
- Family: Comamonadaceae
- Genus: Thiomonas
- Species: T. cuprina

Binomial name
- Thiomonas cuprina Moreira and Amils 1997

Type strain
- DSM 5495, NBRC 102094, NBRC 102145

Species of bacterium

Thiomonas cuprina is an As(III)-oxidizing bacterium from the genus Thiomonas. It is proposed to be reclassified, along with Thiomonas arsenivorans, as strains of Thiomonas delicata.
