= Thiomonas arsenitoxydans =

Scientific classification
- Domain: Bacteria
- Kingdom: Pseudomonadati
- Phylum: Pseudomonadota
- Class: Betaproteobacteria
- Order: Burkholderiales
- Family: Comamonadaceae
- Genus: Thiomonas
- Species: T. arsenitoxydans

Binomial name
- Thiomonas arsenitoxydans Slyemi et al. 2011

Type strain
- CIP 110005, DSM 22701

Species of bacterium

Thiomonas arsenitoxydans is a Gram-negative, moderately acidophilic, non-spore-forming, rod-shaped, motile bacterium from the genus Thiomonas, which has the ability to use arsenite as an energy source by oxidizing it.
