= Thiomonas islandica =

Scientific classification
- Domain: Bacteria
- Kingdom: Pseudomonadati
- Phylum: Pseudomonadota
- Class: Betaproteobacteria
- Order: Burkholderiales
- Family: Comamonadaceae
- Genus: Thiomonas
- Species: T. islandica

Binomial name
- Thiomonas islandica Vésteinsdóttir et al. 2011

Type strain
- 6C, DSM 21436, JCM 16107

Species of bacterium

Thiomonas islandica is a Gram-negative, rod-shaped, motile bacterium from the genus Thiomonas, which has the ability to oxidise sulfur compounds and hydrogen. It was isolated from a hot spring in Graendalur in southwestern Iceland.
