= Thiomonas =

Scientific classification
- Domain: Bacteria
- Kingdom: Pseudomonadati
- Phylum: Pseudomonadota
- Class: Betaproteobacteria
- Order: Burkholderiales
- Family: Comamonadaceae
- Genus: Thiomonas; Moreira and Amils 1997

Type species
- Thiomonas intermedia (London 1963) Moreira and Amils 1997

Species
- Thiomonas arsenitoxydans Thiomonas bhubaneswarensis Thiomonas cuprina Thiomonas delicata Thiomonas intermedia Thiomonas islandica Thiomonas perometabolis Thiomonas thermosulfata

Genus of bacteria

Thiomonas is a genus of Gram-negative, non-spore-forming bacteria in the family Comamonadaceae.
