= Thiomonas thermosulfata =

Scientific classification
- Domain: Bacteria
- Kingdom: Pseudomonadati
- Phylum: Pseudomonadota
- Class: Betaproteobacteria
- Order: Burkholderiales
- Family: Comamonadaceae
- Genus: Thiomonas
- Species: T. thermosulfata

Binomial name
- Thiomonas thermosulfata (Shooner et al. 1996) Moreira and Amils 1997

Type strain
- ATCC 51520, CIP 105295

Synonyms
- Thiobacillus thermosulfatus

Species of bacterium

Thiomonas thermosulfata is a Gram-negative, non-spore-forming bacterium in the genus Thiomonas.
