= Thiomonas perometabolis =

Scientific classification
- Domain: Bacteria
- Kingdom: Pseudomonadati
- Phylum: Pseudomonadota
- Class: Betaproteobacteria
- Order: Burkholderiales
- Family: Comamonadaceae
- Genus: Thiomonas
- Species: T. perometabolis

Binomial name
- Thiomonas perometabolis (London and Rittenberg 1967) Moreira and Amils 1997

Type strain
- ATCC 23370, BCRC 17548, CCRC 17548, CIP 104403, DSM 18570, IAM 12132, IFO 14565, JCM 20426, LMG 7199, LMG 8564, LMG 8695, London THI 023, NBRC 14565, THI 023

Species of bacterium

Thiomonas perometabolis is a bacterium in the genus Thiomonas.
