= Tears of the Turtle Cave =

Limestone cave in Montana

Tears of the Turtle
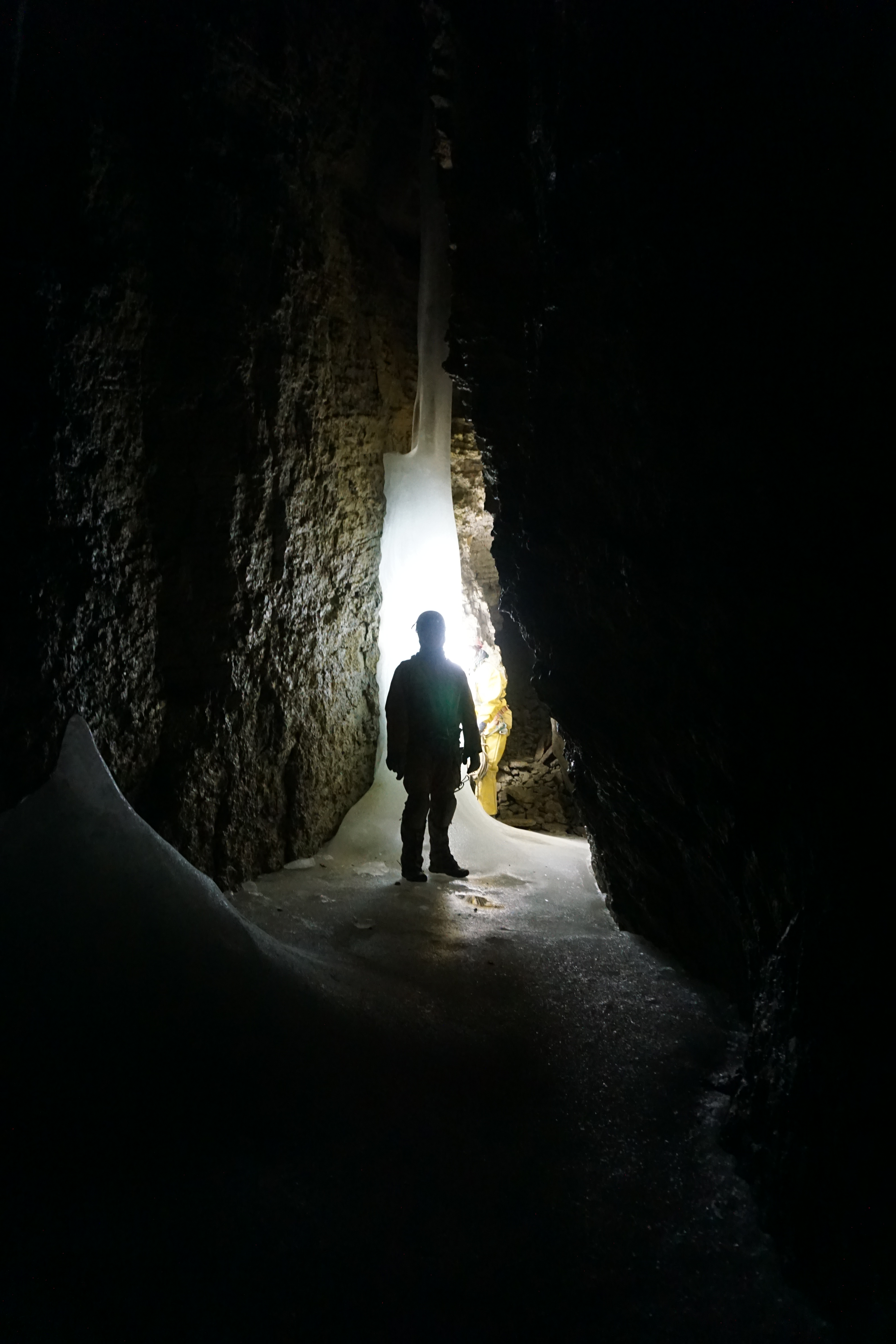
- Interactive map of Tears of the Turtle
- Location: Turtlehead Mountain, Bob Marshall Wilderness
- Coordinates: 47.65754°N 113.244448°W
- Depth: 2,477 feet (755 m)
- Length: 1.88 miles (3,030 m)
- Discovery: 2006
- Geology: karst
- Entrances: 1
- Hazards: Temperature, Vertical, Remote Location

Tears of the Turtle Cave is located in the Bob Marshall Wilderness in western Montana and is currently the deepest known limestone cave in the United States since passing New Mexico's Lechuguilla Cave in 2014. As of August 2024, the cave is known to be 2,477 feet (755 m) deep and 1.88 miles (3,030 m) long. The cave consists mostly of narrow fissure passages passing over approximately 50 short rope drops. The cave has a temperature of 37 °F (3 °C), and it is muddy and poorly decorated.

== Exploration history ==
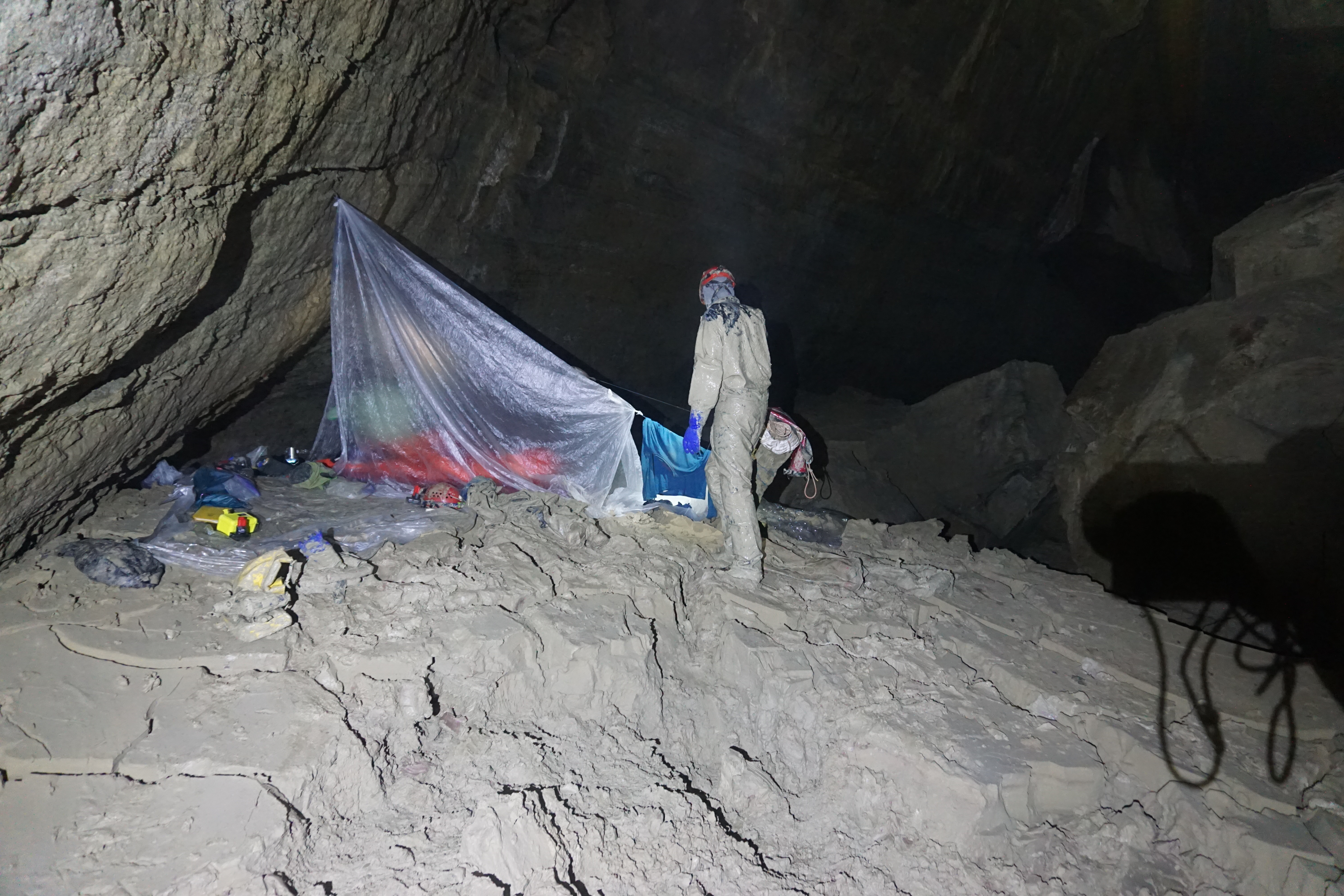
Camp 1, also known as "Mud Camp"

The entrance to Tears of the Turtle Cave was found in 2006. The cave passage is mostly a two to three foot wide fissure that follows a stream downward through over 40 rappels. Initial single-day expeditions of the cave reached a depth of 400 feet. In 2014, a team of nine cavers underwent the first multi-day expedition and explored a new passage pushing the cave to a depth of 1629 feet, surpassing New Mexico's Lechuguilla Cave to become the deepest known limestone cave in the United States. Exploration continued in 2016 when teams descended to a depth of 1659 feet. A 2019 expedition extended the known depth of the cave to 1,863.8 feet (568.1 m)., and in 2022 the cave was explored further to a depth of 2,052 feet (625 m).

In 2024, cavers set up a camp 2 beyond camp 1, and continued exploration of the cave based out of camp 2. The depth of the cave increased to 2,477 feet (755 m), ending at a sump, with other possible leads that could continue the cave further up. Camp 2 was a small room with a pool in the floor that necessitated sleeping in hammocks, which led to cavers naming the camp "Camp Dangle".

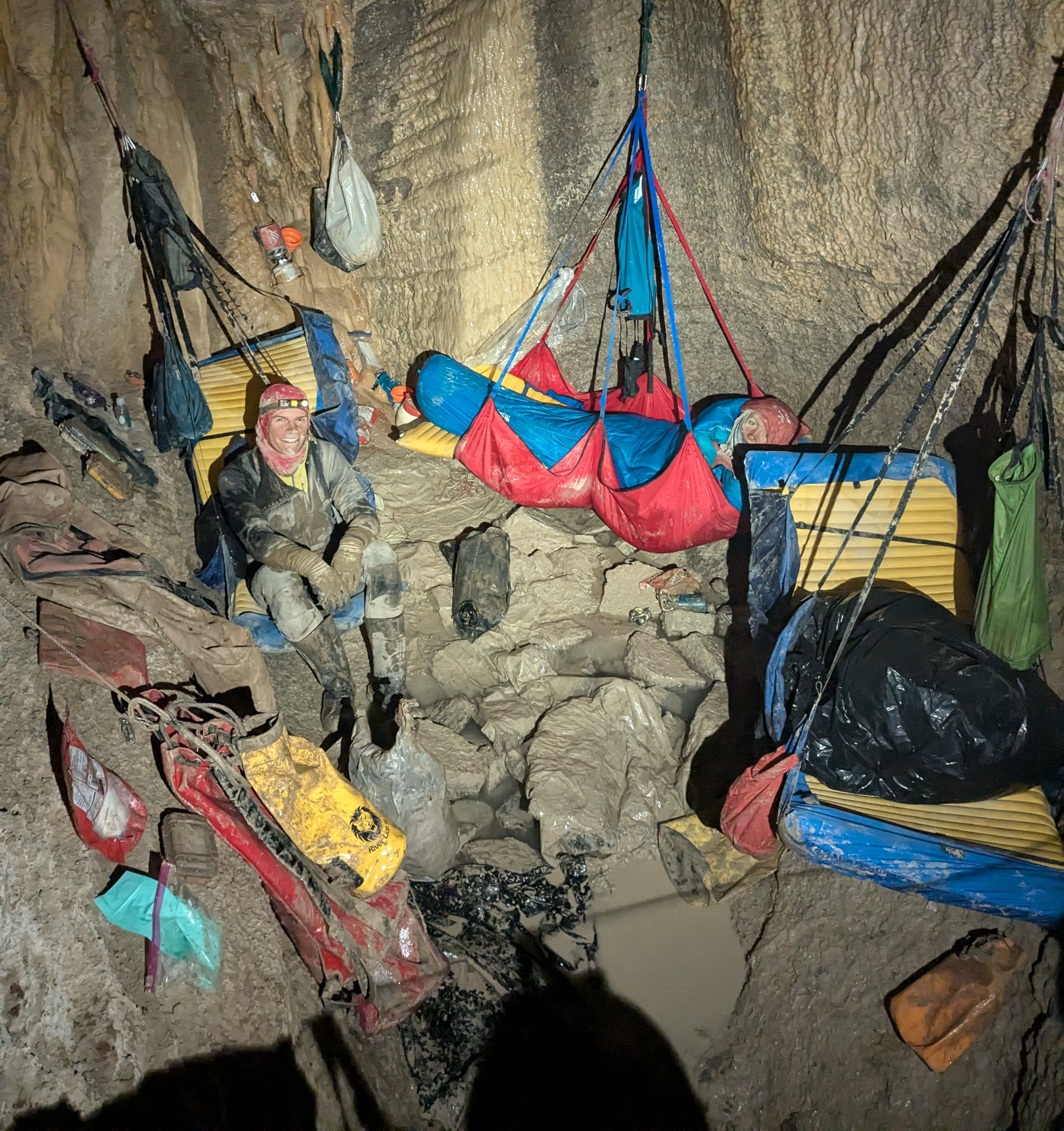
Camp 2 ("Camp Dangle"), near the current known bottom of the cave

The depth of the cave, along with the technical rope work required to reach that depth, 37 °F (3 °C) temperature, and remote location of the cave make continued exploration difficult. Ongoing exploration is done through the Caves of Montana Project, an official project of the National Speleological Society. Exploration is conducted under a MOU with the United States Forest Service.

== Geology ==
The cave is located in typical karst landscape and is formed in the Cambrian Pagoda Limestone. Over the years water from rainfall and snowmelt have dissolved away the limestone to form a typical vadose solutional cave with fissure passage 2–3 feet wide and tall ceilings.

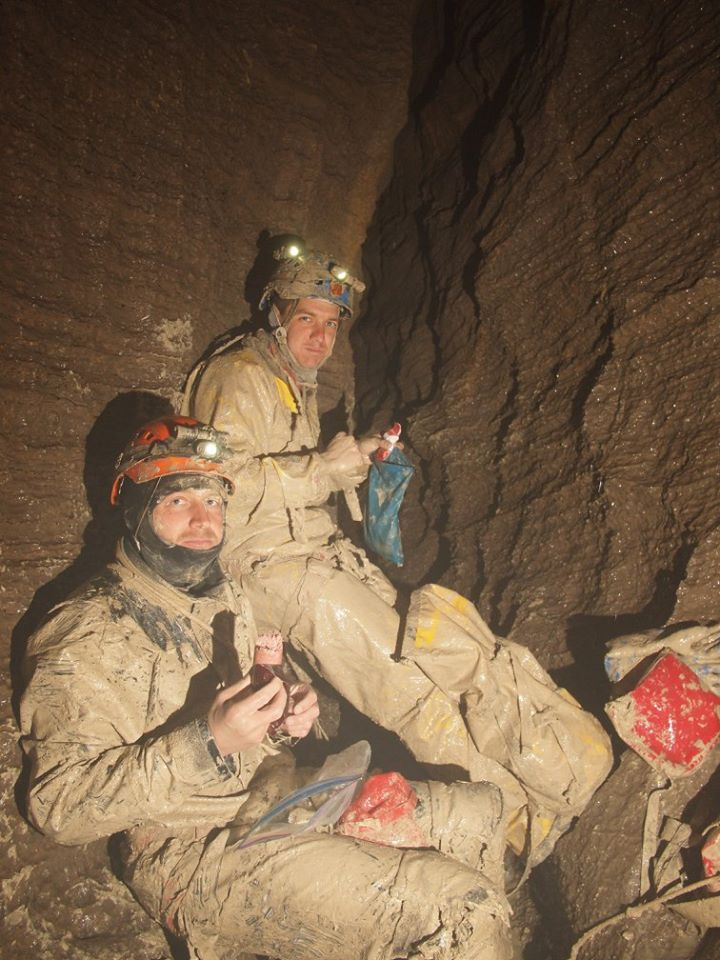
A wide spot in the passage near the known bottom of Tears of the Turtle Cave.

== See also ==
- Lechuguilla Cave
