= Thiomonas delicata =

Scientific classification
- Domain: Bacteria
- Kingdom: Pseudomonadati
- Phylum: Pseudomonadota
- Class: Betaproteobacteria
- Order: Burkholderiales
- Family: Comamonadaceae
- Genus: Thiomonas
- Species: T. delicata

Binomial name
- Thiomonas delicata (Katayama-Fujimura et al. 1984 ex Mizoguchi et al. 1976) Kelly and Wood 2006

Type strain
- BCRC 17549, CCRC 17549, DSM 17897, IAM 12624, IFO 14566, KCTC 2851, LMG 7200, LMG 8696, NBRC 14566, strain THI 091, THI 091, THIO 91, TuT-1

Synonyms
- Thiobacillus delicatus

Species of bacterium

Thiomonas delicata is an As(III)-oxidizing, nonmotile bacterium from the genus Thiomonas. Colonies of T. delicata are whitish-yellow in color. T. delicata is able to oxidize arsenite.
