= Kathleen Lavoie =

American explorer and microbiologist (1949–2022)

- Born: September 28, 1949
- Died: May 23, 2022 (aged 72); Peru, New York, U.S.
- Education: University of New Hampshire; Indiana University Bloomington; University of Illinois at Chicago
- Scientific career
- Workplaces: State University of New York at Plattsburgh
- Thesis: The influence of biotic and abiotic factors on the successional decomposition of cave rat dung (1982)

Kathleen Hoey Lavoie (September 28, 1949 – May 23, 2022) was an American microbiologist and explorer who was Professor of Biological Sciences at the State University of New York at Plattsburgh. Lavoie was a Fellow of the National Speleological Society and the Cave Research Foundation. She was a specialist in biospeleology, and, in particular, the Mammoth Cave National Park in Kentucky.

== Early life and education ==
Lavoie graduated from the University of New Hampshire in 1972 with a degree in microbiology and earned a master's degree in microbiology from Indiana University in 1976. Lavoie joined the University of Illinois at Chicago Circle for doctoral research, where she investigated the decomposition of cave rat dung and earned her doctorate in biological sciences in 1982.

== Research and career ==
After serving as acting dean of arts and sciences at the University of Michigan-Flint, Lavoie joined the State University of New York at Plattsburgh in 1997 as Dean of Arts and Sciences.

Lavoie was an expert and a fan of bats. According to the State University of New York, the shelves in her office were full of stuffed animal versions of bats. Lavoie led several research tips to caves, including the Mammoth Cave National Park in Kentucky. The cave contains several hundred miles of passages. On such visits, Lavoie studied the terrestrial ecosystems. This involved counting the number of Hadenoecus subterraneus, which can be used to estimate the health of the cave. To fairly evaluate the number of crickets, she divided the cave into sections. She also explored the Carlsbad Caverns National Park and Cueva de Villa Luz. The Cueva de Villa Luz is rich in hydrogen sulfide and smells of rotten eggs. Lavoie appeared in the 2004 National Geographic television program Amazing Caves.

Lavoie stepped down as Dean of the Faculty of Arts and Sciences at SUNY Plattsburgh in 2012. She was awarded the Chancellor's Award for Excellence in Scholarship and Creative Activities in 2017.

== Personal life ==
Lavoie died in May 2022 after attending an orchestra recital in Peru, New York.

== Selected publications ==
- Lavoie, Kathleen H.; Helf, Kurt L.; L. Poulson, Thomas (2007). "The biology and ecology of North American cave crickets". Journal of Cave and Karst Studies: 114–134. CiteSeerX 10.1.1.577.8608.
- Northup, Diana; Dahm, Clifford; Lavoie, Kathleen H. (2000). "Evidence for geomicrobiological interactions in Guadalupe caves". Journal of Cave and Karst Studies. 62 (2): 1832.
- Kathleen H. Lavoie; Ara S Winter; Kaitlyn J H Read; Evan M Hughes; Michael N Spilde; Diana E Northup (15 February 2017). "Comparison of bacterial communities from lava cave microbial mats to overlying surface soils from Lava Beds National Monument, USA". PLOS One. 12 (2) e0169339. Bibcode:2017PLoSO..1269339L. doi:10.1371/journal.pone.0169339. ISSN 1932-6203. PMC 5310854. PMID 28199330. Wikidata Q36281083.
