= Diana Northup =

American biologist

Diana Eleanor Northup
- Education: University of New Mexico; West Virginia University; University of Illinois Urbana-Champaign
- Scientific career
- Workplaces: University of New Mexico
- Thesis: Geomicrobiology of caves (2002)

Diana E. Northup is an American microbiologist, speleologist, ecologist, Visiting Professor of Biology, and Professor Emerita of Library Sciences with the University of New Mexico. Her research focuses on the microbial ecology of caves around the world. Dr. Northup is a Fellow of the National Speleological Society and the Cave Research Foundation. She wrote the Wiley textbook Microbial Ecology. She was awarded the National Speleological Society Science Prize in 2013.

== Early life and education ==
Northup was an undergraduate student at West Virginia University, where she studied political science. She moved to the University of Illinois Urbana-Champaign for graduate studies, where she earned a Master's of Library Science in 1972. Northup moved to the University of New Mexico, where she earned a Master's degree in biology in 1988. She remained at the University of New Mexico for her doctoral research, where she studied the geomicrobiology of caves.

== Research and career ==
Northup is a visiting associate professor at the University of New Mexico where she started the Subsurface Life In Mineral Environments (SLIME) team. In particular, Northup studies the colorful ferromanganese deposits that line the walls of Lechuguilla and Spider Cave in Carlsbad Caverns National Park. Her work on the Lechuguilla Cave was featured in a PBS Nova episode, "The Mysterious Life of Caves." She is also interested in the hydrogen sulfide cave known as'Cueva de las Sardinas' or 'Cueva de Villa Luz' in Tabasco.

Northup was elected Fellow of the National Speleological Society in 1992, awarded their Science Prize in 2013, and presented a Luminary talk in 2015.

In 2011, Northup gave a TEDx talk about how she got started in caving and how that influences her mentoring of students.

== Selected publications ==
- Diana E. Northup; Kathleen H. Lavoie (July 2001). "Geomicrobiology of Caves: A Review". Geomicrobiology Journal. 18 (3): 199–222. doi:10.1080/01490450152467750. ISSN 0149-0451. Wikidata Q56804016.
- Louise D. Hose; Arthur N. Palmer; Margaret V. Palmer; Diana E. Northup; Penelope J. Boston; Harvey R. DuChene (September 2000). "Microbiology and geochemistry in a hydrogen-sulphide-rich karst environment". Chemical Geology. 169 (3–4): 399–423. Bibcode:2000ChGeo.169..399H. doi:10.1016/s0009-2541(00)00217-5. ISSN 0009-2541. Wikidata Q56804018.
- P.J. Boston; M.N. Spilde; D.E. Northup; et al. (1 January 2001). "Cave biosignature suites: microbes, minerals, and Mars". Astrobiology. 1 (1): 25–55. Bibcode:2001AsBio...1...25B. doi:10.1089/153110701750137413. ISSN 1531-1074. PMID 12448994. Wikidata Q38494926.
- Read, Kaitlin J.H., Melim, Leslie A., Winter, Ara S., Northup, Diana. "Bacterial Diversity in Vadose Cave Pools: Evidence for Isolated Ecosystems". Journal of Cave and Karst Studies. v. 83, no. 4, p. 163-188. doi:10.4311/2020MB0120

=== Books ===
- Barton, Larry (2011). Microbial ecology. Diana E. Northup. Hoboken, N.J.: Wiley-Blackwell. ISBN 978-1-118-01582-7. OCLC 757394257.
