= Thiomonas intermedia =

Scientific classification
- Domain: Bacteria
- Kingdom: Pseudomonadati
- Phylum: Pseudomonadota
- Class: Betaproteobacteria
- Order: Burkholderiales
- Family: Comamonadaceae
- Genus: Thiomonas
- Species: T. intermedia

Binomial name
- Thiomonas intermedia (London 1963) Moreira and Amils 1997

Type strain
- ATCC 15466, BCRC 17547, CCRC 17547, CIP 104401, DSM 18155, IAM 12131, IFO 14564, JCM 20425, LMG 7198, LMG 8563, LMG 8694, NBRC 14564, NCIB 9515, NCIMB 9515, THI 101

Species of bacterium

Thiomonas intermedia is a Gram-negative, aerobic, moderately acidophilic bacterium from the genus Thiomonas, which has the ability to oxidise sulfur compounds. Thiomonas intermedia was isolated from an sewage pipe in Hamburg.
