= Thermithiobacillus tepidarius =

Scientific classification
- Domain: Bacteria
- Kingdom: Pseudomonadati
- Phylum: Pseudomonadota
- Class: Acidithiobacillia
- Order: Acidithiobacillales
- Family: Thermithiobacillaceae
- Genus: Thermithiobacillus
- Species: T. tepidarius

Binomial name
- Thermithiobacillus tepidarius (Wood and Kelly 1985) Kelly and Wood 2000

Type strain
- DSM 3134^{T}

Species of bacterium

Thermithiobacillus tepidarius (from the Latin tepidarium; a warm bath fed by natural thermal water) is a member of the Acidithiobacillia isolated from the thermal groundwaters of the Roman Baths at Bath, Somerset, United Kingdom. It was previously placed in the genus Thiobacillus. The organism is a moderate thermophile, 43–45 °C (109–113 °F), and an obligate aerobic chemolithotrophic autotroph. Despite having an optimum pH of 6.0–7.5, growth can continue to an acid medium of pH 4.8. Growth can only occur on reduced inorganic sulfur compounds (thiosulfate, polythionates from trithionate to octathionate pace pentathionate, sulfide) and elementary sulfur, but unlike some species in other genus of the same family, Acidithiobacillus, Thermithiobacillus spp. are unable to oxidise ferrous iron or iron-containing minerals.

The genome sequence was completed in 2016.
