= Acidithiobacillus caldus =

Scientific classification
- Domain: Bacteria
- Kingdom: Pseudomonadati
- Phylum: Pseudomonadota
- Class: Acidithiobacillia
- Order: Acidithiobacillales
- Family: Acidithiobacillaceae
- Genus: Acidithiobacillus
- Species: A. caldus

Binomial name
- Acidithiobacillus caldus (Kelly and Wood 2000)

Type strain
- DSM 8584 (Kelly & Wood 2000)

Synonyms
- Thiobacillus caldus (Hallberg & Lindstrom 1994)

Species of bacterium

Acidithiobacillus caldus formerly belonged to the genus Thiobacillus prior to 2000, when it was reclassified along with a number of other bacterial species into one of three new genera that better categorize sulfur-oxidizing acidophiles. As a member of the Gammaproteobacteria class of Pseudomonadota, A. caldus may be identified as a Gram-negative bacterium that is frequently found in pairs. Considered to be one of the most common microbes involved in biomining, it is capable of oxidizing reduced inorganic sulfur compounds (RISCs) that form during the breakdown of sulfide minerals. The meaning of the prefix acidi- in the name Acidithiobacillus comes from the Latin word acidus, signifying that members of this genus love a sour, acidic environment. Thio is derived from the Greek word thios and describes the use of sulfur as an energy source, and bacillus describes the shape of these microorganisms, which are small rods. The species name, caldus, is derived from the Latin word for warm or hot, denoting this species' love of a warm environment.

== History ==
Thiobacillus caldus was reclassified into Acidithiobacillus, one of three new genera (also including Halothiobacillus and Thermithiobacillus) created to further classify members of the genus which fall into the alpha-, beta-, and gamma-classes of the Pseudomonadota. Thiobacillus species exhibit a tremendous amount of diversity in physiology and DNA composition, which was one reason for reclassification of this species into a new genus containing four species of acidophiles (microorganisms which function best in an acidic environment), some of which are also capable of oxidizing iron[II] and sulfide minerals.

A. caldus, originally isolated from spoils of unneeded rocks encountered when mining coal, was the first acidophilic species of thermophilic thiobacilli to be described. The type strain of this species, DSM 8584, also known as strain KU, has been deposited in the Deutsche Sammlung von Mikroorganismen und Zellkulturen, a collection of microorganisms in Germany.

== Morphology ==
A. caldus is a short, rod-shaped, Gram-negative bacterium that possesses motility via a single polar flagellum located on its outer cell wall, which displays characteristics of a typical Gram-negative cell wall. It is about 1 by 1-2 μm in length and frequently is found in pairs. Different strains have been shown to vary in size when compared to one another. One of the smaller strains, BC13, has a diameter around 0.7 μm and is about 1.2 μm in length, whereas strain KU is a little longer, with a diameter of roughly 0.8 μm and a length around 1.8 μm.

== Physiological tolerance ==
A. caldus displays tolerance to a broad range of conditions, including acidic pH levels and temperature, with the best growth occurring at a pH of 2.0 to 2.5 and a temperature of 45 °C. Optimal growth results in a short generation time of 2–3 hours, depending on the environmental factors present. A. caldus is not considered to be halophilic because it displayed no signs of growth in environments containing NaCl.

=== Temperature ===
A. caldus is moderately thermophilic and thrives at an optimum temperature of 45 °C. Certain strains, such as strain KU, have still been shown to exhibit growth on a tetrathionate medium in conditions with a temperature range as low as 32 °C and as high as 52 °C. When grown on a medium containing sulfur, strain BC13 has been found to tolerate temperatures as high as 55 °C. A genetic basis is thought to exist for the extreme temperature tolerance shown by A. caldus as compared to other species in its genus, such as A. ferrooxidans and A. thiooxidans.

=== pH ===
As with all acidophilic microorganisms, A. caldus thrives best in an environment with a low, acidic pH with a preferred pH range of 2.0-2.5. This microorganism is capable of coping with a large pH gradient across the cellular membrane, keeping its intracellular pH around a nearly neutral level of 6.5. Certain strains, including KU and BC13, have been found to display signs of growth in a broad, acidic pH range, with a slow growth rate involving a longer generation time, about 45 hours, at a pH of 4.0 and a rate of 6–7 hours at a pH of 1.0. A. caldus has its shortest generation time of 2–3 hours in conditions involving a pH between 2.0 and 2.5. No growth was observed at a pH of 0.5, showing that some conditions are simply too acidic to support the growth of even extreme acidophiles.

== Metabolism ==
A. caldus is capable of oxidizing reduced inorganic sulfur compounds along with other substrates including molecular hydrogen, and formate, in addition to numerous organic compounds and sulfide minerals. It displays chemolithotrophic growth when exposed to substrates containing sulfur, tetrathionate, or thiosulfate, with sulfate being produced as the end product. Reduced sulfur compounds are used by A. caldus to support its autotrophic growth in an environment which lacks sunlight. The growth of A. caldus is enhanced when the air used for sparging, a process by which bubbles of a chemically inert gas are pumped through a liquid, is supplemented with 2% (w/v) CO_{2}. Neither 0.05% yeast extract (a yeast product formed when a cell's walls are removed and its internal contents are extracted), casamino acids (an amino acid/peptide mixture common to microbial growth media formed from the acid hydrolysis of casein), nor a 2.5 mM concentration of glucose as the sole substrate have been shown to induce heterotrophic growth of A. caldus. Instead, growth is seen to occur mixotrophically with tetrathionate and yeast extract or glucose. Strain BC13 is capable of growth on a glucose medium, but not after being transferred to a glucose medium from one that contained sulfur in addition to glucose.

Key intermediates in the metabolism of A. caldus are elemental sulfur (S^{0}) and tetrathionate. The hydrolysis of tetrathionate by the key enzyme tetrathionate hydrolase (tetH), composed of 503 amino acids, yields pentathionate, thiosulfate, and sulfur, while elemental sulfur is oxidized by sulfite into sulfate.

== Genomics ==
Most of what is known about the genus Acidithiobacillus comes from experimentation and genomic analyses of two of its species: A. ferrooxidans and A. caldus. With a length of 2,932,225 base pairs, the genomic sequence of A. caldus is GC-rich with a GC content (mol%) in the range of 63.1-63.9% for strain KU and 61.7% for strain BC13. DNA hybridization studies have revealed that strains KU and BC13 exhibited 100% homology with each other, yet showed no DNA hybridization of significance (2-20%) with other species in the genus including A. ferrooxidans and A. thiooxidans, or with other similar Pseudomonadota, such as Thiomonas cuprina or Thiobacillus thioparus.

Strains of A. caldus have been differentiated from other related acidithiobacilli, including A. ferrooxidans and A. thiooxidans, by sequence analyses of the PCR-amplified 16S-23S rDNA intergenic spacer (ITS) and restriction fragment length polymorphism. Phylogenetic analysis of ITS sequences was sufficient to differentiate three unique species of Acidithiobacillus that were found to have slightly different physiological tolerances. The 16S-23S rDNA spacer region is a useful target for developing molecular methods that focus on the detection, rapid differentiation, and identification of Acidithiobacillus species.

== Applications ==
Since its discovery in 1994, A. caldus has been found to have a significant practical application in the industrial field of biomining and mineral biotechnology, contributing to the enhanced recovery of desired minerals from rocks known as ores. Metals such as gold have been recovered from ores which contain pyrite (also known as fool's gold) and arsenopyrite, two sulfide minerals that are often associated with considerable amounts of this precious metal.

Biomining refers to both biooxidation, where the sulfide mineral surrounding the desired metal is oxidized to expose the metal of interest, and bioleaching, where the sulfide mineral is solubilized to obtain the metal of interest. Due to the exothermic nature of bioleaching, the thermophilic nature of A. caldus allows for less cooling and quicker rates of bioleaching overall. Bacteria belonging to the genus Acidithiobacillus possess the ability to oxidize sulfidic ores and thereby solubilize metals. This ability has contributed to a general public interest in this microorganism because of its application in the industrial bioleaching of metals from ores and because of its effective means by which to recover precious metals. Bacteria involved in bioleaching function primarily to produce Fe^{3+} from the oxidation of ferrous iron, which is then used to carry out sulfur oxidization, which provides an essential energy source for important cellular metabolic functions
