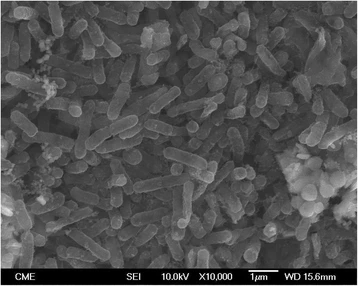
- Acidithiobacillus thiooxidans strain CLST

Scientific classification
- Domain: Bacteria
- Kingdom: Pseudomonadati
- Phylum: Pseudomonadota
- Class: Acidithiobacillia
- Order: Acidithiobacillales
- Family: Acidithiobacillaceae
- Genus: Acidithiobacillus
- Species: A. thiooxidans

Binomial name
- Acidithiobacillus thiooxidans (Kelly and Wood 2000)

Type strain
- DSM 17318; ATCC 19377T; DAMS

Synonyms
- Thiobacillus concretivorus Kelly & Harrison 1989; Thiobacillus thiooxidans Kelly & Wood 2000

= Acidithiobacillus thiooxidans =

Species of bacterium

Acidithiobacillus thiooxidans, formerly known as Thiobacillus thiooxidans until its reclassification into the newly designated genus Acidithiobacillus of the Acidithiobacillia subclass of Pseudomonadota, is a Gram-negative, rod-shaped bacterium that uses sulfur as its primary energy source. It is mesophilic, with a temperature optimum of 28 °C. This bacterium is commonly found in soil, sewer pipes, and cave biofilms called snottites. A. thiooxidans is used in the mining technique known as bioleaching, where metals are extracted from their ores through the action of microbes.

== Morphology ==
A. thiooxidans is a Gram-negative, rod-shaped bacterium with rounded ends that occurs in nature either as singlecells, as is the most common case, or sometimes in pairs, but rarely in triplets. Its motility is due to a polar flagellum. It is an obligate acidophile with an optimal pH less than 4.0, but it also qualifies as an obligate aerobe and chemolithotroph. Described as a colorless, sulfur-oxidizing bacterium, A. thiooxidans does not accumulate sulfur either within or outside of its very small cells, which have an average size around 0.5 μm in diameter and 1 μm or less in length.

== Cultural characteristics ==
A. thiooxidans has so far not grown on agar or other solid media, instead it prefers liquid media with a strong, evenly dispersed clouding throughout, and it produces no sediment formation or surface growth. Although it does not grow on traditional organic media, it will not be harmed by a medium containing peptone or glucose. Media best suited for its growth are those that are inorganic and allow A. thiooxidans to use sulfur as a source of energy. The following characteristic reactions accompany the growth of A. thiooxidans in the presence of tricalcium phosphate: the layer on the surface of the medium formed by sulfur tends to drop to the bottom, tricalcium phosphate is dissolved by the product of sulfur oxidation, sulfuric acid, giving soluble phosphate and CaSO_{4} + 2 H_{2}O, and radiating monoclinic crystals that hang from the sulfur particles floating on the medium surface or protruding upward from the bottom are formed by the precipitation of calcium sulfate. The medium becomes acidic with a pH around 2.8 and remains stationary until all the calcium phosphate has been dissolved. Anything with the tendency to change the medium to an alkaline state would be considered harmful to the uniform growth of A. thiooxidans, but if it is left unharmed by an excess of acid or alkali, numerous consecutive generations may be kept alive on the liquid media.

== Temperature range ==
A.s thiooxidans thrives at an optimum temperature of 28-30 °C. At lower temperatures (18 °C and below) and at 37 °C or higher, sulfur oxidation and growth are significantly slower, while temperatures between 55 and 60 °C are sufficient to kill the organism.

== Metabolism ==
A. thiobacillus, a strictly aerobic species, fixes CO_{2} from the atmosphere to meet its carbon requirements. In addition, other essential nutrients are required in varying amounts. A general lack of knowledge exists for acidophilic microorganisms in terms of the oxidation systems of reduced inorganic sulfur compounds (RISCs). Fazzini et al.. (2013) presented the first experimentally validated stoichiometric model that was able to quantitatively assess the RISCs oxidation in A. thiooxidans (strain DSM 17318), the sulfur-oxidizing acidophilic chemolithotrophic archetype. By analyzing literature and by genomic analyses, a mix of formerly proposed models of RISCs oxidation were combined and evaluated experimentally, placing thiosulfate partial oxidation by the Sox system (SoxABXYZ), along with abiotic reactions, as the central steps of the sulfur oxidation model. This model, paired with a detailed stoichiometry of the production of biomass, provides accurate predictions of bacterial growth. This model, which has the potential to be used in biohydrometallurgical and environmental applications, constitutes an advanced instrument for optimizing the biomass production of A. thiooxidans.

=== Essential nutrients ===
==== Carbon ====
A. thiooxidans derives all of the energy needed to satisfy its carbon requirement from the fixation of CO_{2}. An important distinction can be made between sulfur-oxidizing and nitrifying bacteria by their response to the introduction of carbon to the culture in the form of carbonates and bicarbonates. Carbonates keep the medium alkaline, thus preventing growth of A. thiooxidans which grows best under acidic conditions, while bicarbonates have been shown to allow a healthy growth if kept in small concentrations. Bicarbonate, however, is unnecessary because the CO_{2} from the atmosphere appears to be sufficient to support growth of A. thiooxidans, and would actually have an injurious effect in that it would tend to make the medium less acidic.

==== Nitrogen ====
A. thiooxidans requires only small amounts of nitrogen due to its small amount of growth, but the best sources are ammonium salts of inorganic acids, especially sulfate, followed by the ammonium salts of organic acids, nitrates, asparagine, and amino acids. If no nitrogen source is introduced into the medium, some growth is observed, with A. thiooxidans deriving the necessary nitrogen from either traces of atmospheric ammonia, distilled water, or the contamination of other salts.

==== Oxygen ====
A. thiooxidans is obligately aerobic because it uses atmospheric oxygen for the oxidation of sulfur to sulfuric acid.

=== Influence of organic substances ===
In the presence of a good nitrogen source, organic substances like glucose, glycerol, mannitol, and alcohol seem to either act similarly to stimulants or take part in the organism's structural requirements, causing no harm to A. thiooxidans and appearing to have somewhat of a favorable effect on it.

== Energy source ==
A. thiooxidans uses elemental sulfur as its primary energy source and oxidizes it by the sulfide-quinone reductase and sox pathways. Sulfur is oxidized to sulfuric acid by A. thiooxidans and the energy liberated is used for growth and maintenance. In addition to sulfur, A. thiooxidans can use thiosulfate or tetrathionate as sources of energy, but growth in a liquid medium on thiosulfate is slow, generally taking about 10 to 12 days under favorable conditions as opposed to only 4 to 5 days for growth on elemental sulfur, as demonstrated by the change in pH and turbidity. A. thiooxidans is incapable of oxidizing iron or pyrite, but it has been shown to grow on sulfur from pyrite when cocultured with the bacterium Leptospirillum ferrooxidans, a species that can oxidize iron but not sulfur.

A. thiooxidans is completely autotrophic and, although glucose does not cause any harm and can be beneficial to some extent, the amount of acid produced and sulfur oxidized are not significantly different between cultures that either contained or did not contain glucose.

=== Autotrophy ===
As an autotrophic bacterium, A. thiooxidans uses inorganic substances to fulfill its energy requirement, and atmospheric carbon to satisfy its carbon demands. Because A. thiooxidans derives its energy from inorganic elemental sulfur, carbon directly from the atmosphere, and nitrogen from ammonium sulfate and other inorganic salts, and also because of its small mineral requirements, this autotrophic microorganism was likely among the first aerobes contributing to weathering through the formation of sulfuric acid, which interacted with insoluble phosphates, carbonates, and silicates.

== Phylogeny ==
Most of the information about Acidithiobacillus comes from experimental and genome-based analyses of two other related species, Acidithiobacillus: A. ferrooxidans and A. caldus. The complete draft genome sequence of A. thiooxidans ATCC 19377 was determined using a whole-genome shotgun strategy and was revealed to contain a total of 3,019,868 base pairs in 164 contigs. The GC ratio was found to be 53.1% to 46.9%; 3,235 protein-coding genes were predicted in the genome of A. thiooxidans, which also contained 43 tRNAs, one complete and one partial 5S-16S-23S operon, and complete sets of genes for amino acid, nucleotide, inorganic sulfur compound, and central carbon metabolism. The genome also contains the genes sulfur quinone oxidoreductase (sqr), tetrathionate hydrolase (tetH), and thiosulfate quinone oxidoreductase (doxD), along with the two gene clusters that encode the sulfur oxidation complex SOX (soxYZB-hyp-resB-saxAX-resC and soxYZA-hyp-soxB), which were previously found in A. caldus and Thiobacillus denitrificans, a neutrophilic sulfur oxidizer. Acidithiobacillus thiooxidans strains have been differentiated from other related Acidithiobacilli, including A. ferrooxidans and A. caldus, by sequence analyses of the PCR-amplified 16S-23S rDNA intergenic spacer (ITS) and restriction fragment length polymorphism (RFLP). The strains of A. thiooxidans that were investigated by these researchers (metal mine isolates) yielded RFLP patterns that were identical to the A. thiooxidans type strain (ATCC 19377T), except for strain DAMS, which had a distinct pattern for all enzymes tested. All three Acidithiobacillus species were differentiated by phylogenetic analysis of the ITS sequences. The size and sequence polymorphism of the ITS3 region contributed to the inter- and infraspecific genetic variations that were detected in this analysis. No significant correlation was shown by Mantel tests between the similarity of ITS sequences and the geographical origin of strains. Bergamo et al.. (2004) concluded that the 16S-23S rDNA spacer region is a useful target for developing molecular methods that focus on the detection, rapid differentiation and identification of Acidithiobacillus species.

== Snottites ==
Snottites are highly acidic biofilms (pH 0-1) that form on the walls and ceilings of hydrogen sulfide-rich caves where sulfide-rich springs gas H_{2}S into the cave air. The snottite microbial communities have very low species diversity and are predominantly composed of sulfur-oxidizing microorganisms. Sulfide oxidation produces sulfuric acid, which dissolves the limestone walls of the cave. Microcrystalline gypsum precipitates as a corrosion residue that eventually limits pH buffering by the underlying limestone and enables the development of extremely acidic wall surfaces. A. thiooxidans is known to inhabit these biofilms. Snottite morphology and distribution within caves depends on the availability of carbon, nitrogen, and energy substrates in the atmosphere. Snottite formations are generally milky in color, suspended vertically from cave ceilings and walls, and have a phlegm-like consistency (hence the name).

=== Frasassi cave system, Italy ===
Le Grotte di Frasassi (Frasassi Caves) are located in the Apennine Mountains in the Marches Region, central Italy. This cave system was formed by the process of sulfuric acid speleogenesis due to sulfide-oxidizing microorganisms. The snottites within the Frasassi Caves are very viscous with a pH range of 0-2.5. The most abundant bacterial 16S rRNA sequences (>98% 16S rRNA similarity) in snottites collected throughout the Frasassi cave system are relatives of A. thiooxidans and the genera Acidimicrobium and Ferrimicrobium (family Acidimicrobiaceae, Actinobacteria). FISH analyses of snottite samples have indicated that Acidithiobacillus and the Acidimicrobiaceae are the most abundant bacterial populations within the caves. Populations of biofilms in the Frasassi cave system are dominated by A. thiooxidans (>70% of cell population) with smaller populations including an archaeon in the uncultivated G-plasma clade of Thermoplasmatales (>15%) and a bacterium in the family Acidimicrobiaceae (>5%). Acidithiobacillus is believed to be the primary producer and the snottite architect.

== Bioleaching ==
Bioleaching is a mining technique in which metals are extracted from their insoluble ores through the use of living organisms by biological oxidation. This technique has progressed steadily in the past 20 years by taking advantage of bacteria such as A. thiooxidans. Biomining operations have enabled the solubilization of low-grade mineral ores. Compared to traditional smelting and extracting procedures, bioleaching is much less expensive and does not release as many environmental toxicants, but it does require a greater amount of time. Bioleaching involves at least three important subprocesses, viz., attack of the sulfide mineral, microbial oxidation of ferrous iron, and some sulfur moiety. The overall process occurs via one of two pathways depending on the nature of the sulfide mineral, a pathway via thiosulfate resulting in sulfate being formed or a polythionate pathway resulting in the formation of elemental sulfur.
