= Lechuguilla Cave =

Cave in Eddy County, New Mexico, U.S.

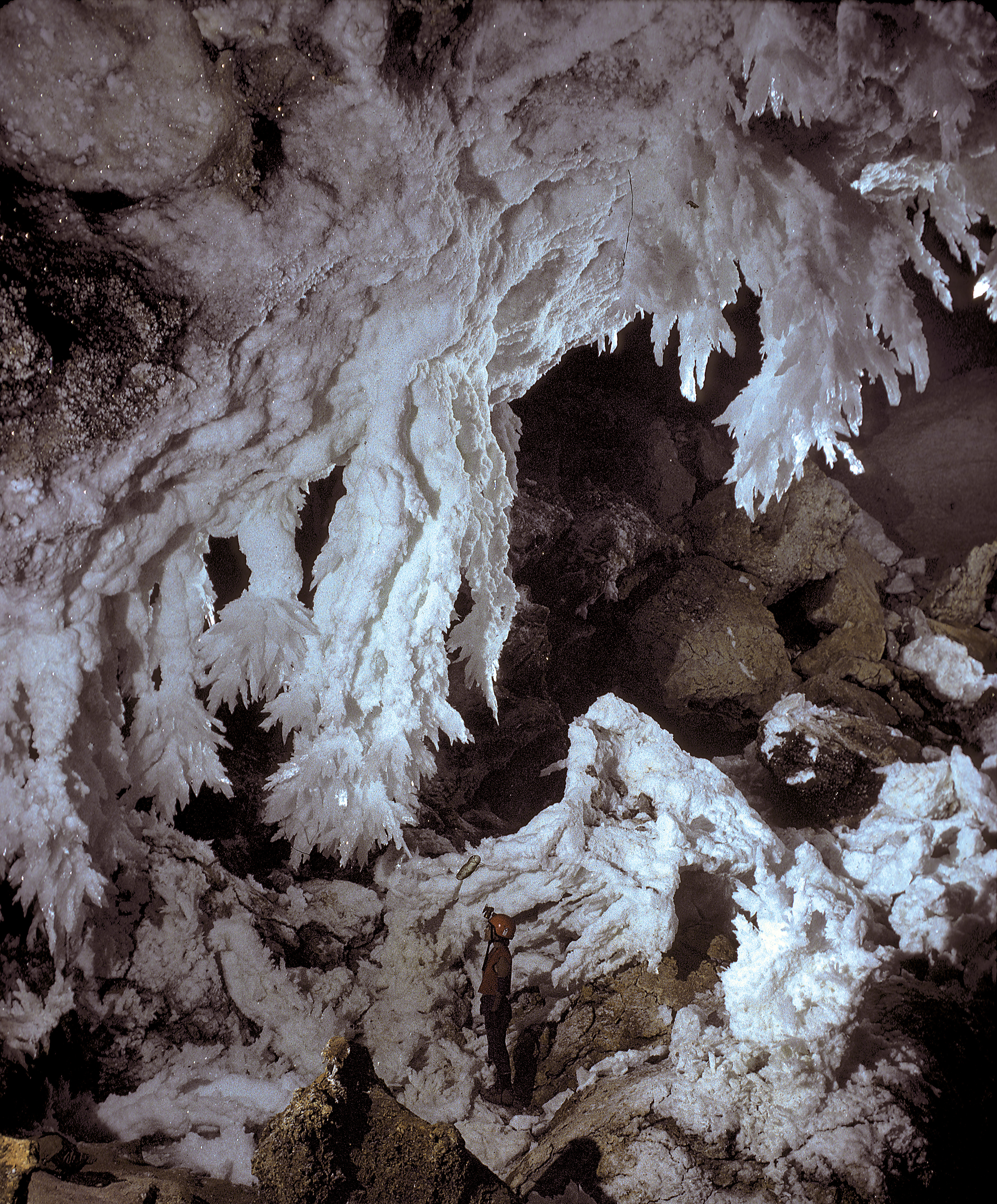
- Largest known gypsum stalactites, Chandelier Ballroom (human at bottom gives scale)

- Location within New Mexico Location within the United States
- Location: Eddy County, New Mexico, U.S.
- Nearest city: Carlsbad
- Coordinates: 32°11′26″N 104°30′11″W
- Length: 150.3 mi (241.9 km)
- Governing body: National Park Service

Lechuguilla Cave is a cave in Carlsbad Caverns National Park, New Mexico, United States, known for its unusual geology, rare formations, and pristine condition. At 152.11 miles (244.80 km), it is the ninth-longest explored cave in the world. Its measured depth of 1,588.6 feet (484.2 m) makes it the seventh-deepest cave in the United States.

The cave is named for the canyon through which it is entered, which is named for Agave lechuguilla, a species of plant found there. Access to the cave is limited to approved scientific researchers, survey and exploration teams, and National Park Service management-related trips.

== Exploration history ==
Lechuguilla Cave was known until 1986 as a small, insignificant historic site in the park's back country. Small amounts of bat guano were mined from the entrance passages for a year under a mining claim filed in 1914. The historic cave contained a 90-foot (27 m) entrance pit known as Misery Hole, which led to 400 feet (122 m) of dry, dead-end passages.

The cave was visited infrequently after mining activities ceased. However, in the 1950s, cavers heard wind roaring up from the rubble-choked cave floor. Although no route was obvious, people concluded that more cave passages were present below the rubble. Led by Dave Allured, a group of cavers from the Colorado Grotto gained permission from the National Park Service to begin digging in 1984. On May 25, 1986, they broke through into large, naturally-occurring walking passages. Since then, explorers have mapped over 150 miles (240 km) of passages, making Lechuguilla the ninth-longest cave in the world and fourth-longest in the United States.

In May 2012, a team led by Derek Bristol of Colorado climbed more than 410 feet (120 m) into a dome and discovered several passages, pits, and large rooms. This new section was named "Oz", and many of its features were named after items from The Wizard of Oz. The discovery included a large room measuring 600 feet (180 m) long, up to 150 feet (46 m) wide, and up to 150 feet (46 m) high. It was named "Munchkinland". A pit, named "Kansas Twister", at over 510 feet (160 m) from floor to ceiling, is the deepest pit discovered in the park. The team spent eight days mapping Oz, adding the largest distance to the survey since 1989, and bringing the total length to 134.6 miles (216.6 km).

Lechuguilla was the deepest known cave in the United States until the exploration of Tears of the Turtle Cave in 2014.

== Geology ==
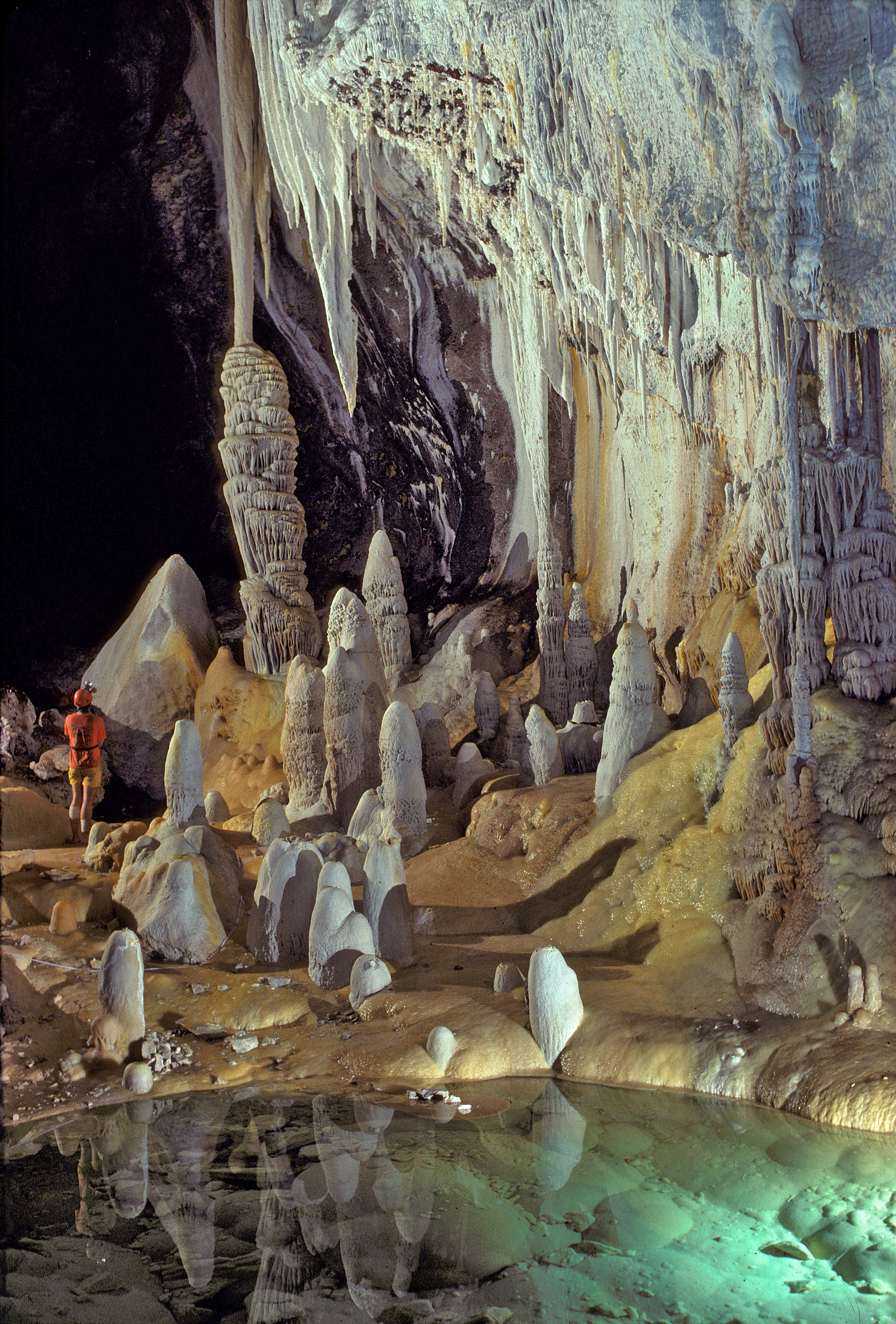
Stalagmites, stalactites, and draperies by a pool

Lechuguilla Cave holds a variety of rare speleothems, including lemon-yellow sulfur deposits, 20-foot (6.1 m) gypsum chandeliers, 20-foot (6.1 m) gypsum hairs and beards, 15-foot (4.6 m) soda straws, hydromagnesite balloons, cave pearls, subaqueous helictites, rusticles, U-loops, and J-loops. Lechuguilla Cave surpasses nearby Carlsbad Cavern in size, depth, and variety of speleothems, though no room has been discovered yet in Lechuguilla Cave that is larger than Carlsbad's Big Room.

The cave is the first known to extend deep enough into the Guadalupe Mountains that scientists may study five separate geologic formations from the inside. The profusion of gypsum and sulfur supports speleogenesis by sulfuric acid dissolution. The sulfuric acid is believed to be derived from hydrogen sulfide that migrated from nearby oil deposits. The cavern formed from the bottom up, unlike the normal top-down carbonic acid dissolution mechanism of cave formation.

Lechuguilla Cave lies beneath a park wilderness area. The cave's passages may extend out of the park into adjacent Bureau of Land Management (BLM) land. A major threat to the cave is proposed gas and oil drilling on BLM land. Any leakage of gas or fluids into the cave's passages could kill cave life or cause explosions.

== Microbiology ==
Rare chemolithoautotrophic bacteria are believed to occur in the cave. These bacteria feed on the sulfur, iron, and manganese minerals and may assist in enlarging the cave and determining the shapes of unusual speleothems. The claim in the BBC documentary series Planet Earth that these bacteria do not derive any energy from the sun is incorrect, in that sulfur-oxidizing bacteria found in the cave use atmospheric oxygen (derived from sunlight-driven photosynthesis) as an electron acceptor, with the electron donor (source of energy) derived from dissolved groundwater hydrogen sulfide gas.

Other studies indicate that some microbes may have medicinal qualities that are beneficial to humans. Some of the bacterial strains isolated from the cave have been found to harbor novel pathways for antibiotic resistance. A 4 million year-old strain of Paenibacillus isolated from soil samples in Lechuguilla Cave was found to be naturally resistant to many modern antibiotics, including daptomycin.

== Filming ==
The Denver Museum of Nature and Science filmed one of the first documentaries in the cave: 1987's "Lechuguilla Cave: The Hidden Giant", which featured many of the cavers responsible for the breakthrough and initial survey work. The video was broadcast on the Denver PBS station KRMA-TV in 1989.

The 1992 National Geographic Society program Mysteries Underground was also filmed extensively in Lechuguilla Cave.

Lechuguilla Cave appears in the BBC documentary series Planet Earth. The fourth episode, "Caves", aired on April 22, 2007, documented scientists and filmmakers exploring Lechuguilla Cave, including the Chandelier Ballroom, which has high-quality crystals. The team took two years to get permission to film.

In October 2016, crew members from London-based production company Nutopia descended into Lechuguilla Cave with microbiologist Hazel Barton to film a sequence for season 1, episode 4 (titled "Genesis") of the National Geographic series One Strange Rock.

== See also ==
- List of longest caves in the United States
- List of longest caves
