= Sulfuric acid cave =

Caves formed by sulfuric acid dissolution of carbonate bedrock

Sulfuric acid caves are caves formed when groundwater containing sulfuric acid (H_{2}SO_{4}) comes into contact with carbonate bedrock, creating a void in the rock.

== Geochemistry and formation ==
The sulfuric acid that causes sulfuric acid speleogenesis is mostly derived from the oxidation of dissolved hydrogen sulfide (H_{2}S). This H_{2}S is in turn mainly derived from thermal or microbial sulfate reduction, though it is sometimes magmatic in origin. Thermal sulfate reduction is typical of deep environments (2.5 to 6 km deep, requiring temperatures between 100°C to 140°C) while microbial sulfate reduction is more prevalent in shallower, cooler (up to 80°C) environments, where it is cool enough to be hospitable to sulfate-reducing microbes. Both forms of sulfate reduction rely on the presence of sulfates and on the presence of organic materials (frequently hydrocarbon deposits) from sediment to act as electron donors.

When groundwater carrying dissolved hydrogen sulfide encounters oxidizing conditions (oxygenated groundwater, preexisting caves), the H_{2}S is oxidized into sulfuric acid. This is a mostly oxic process, although in low-oxygen environments, alternate electron acceptors like nitrate may allow the reaction to proceed. Sulfide minerals like pyrite and galena may be present in the carbonate host rock, and are frequently oxidized into sulfuric acid along with or instead of H_{2}S.

Once sulfuric acid is present, it begins dissolving the carbonate host rock:

CaCO_{3} + H_{2}SO_{4} + 2H_{2}O ⇌ CaSO_{4} • 2H_{2}O + CO_{2} + H_{2}O

The CO_{2}/carbonic acid released by this reaction may continue eroding the host rock on its own, as in carbonic acid speleogenesis. The dissolved sulfate anions and metal cations then begin precipitating into sulfate minerals such as gypsum.

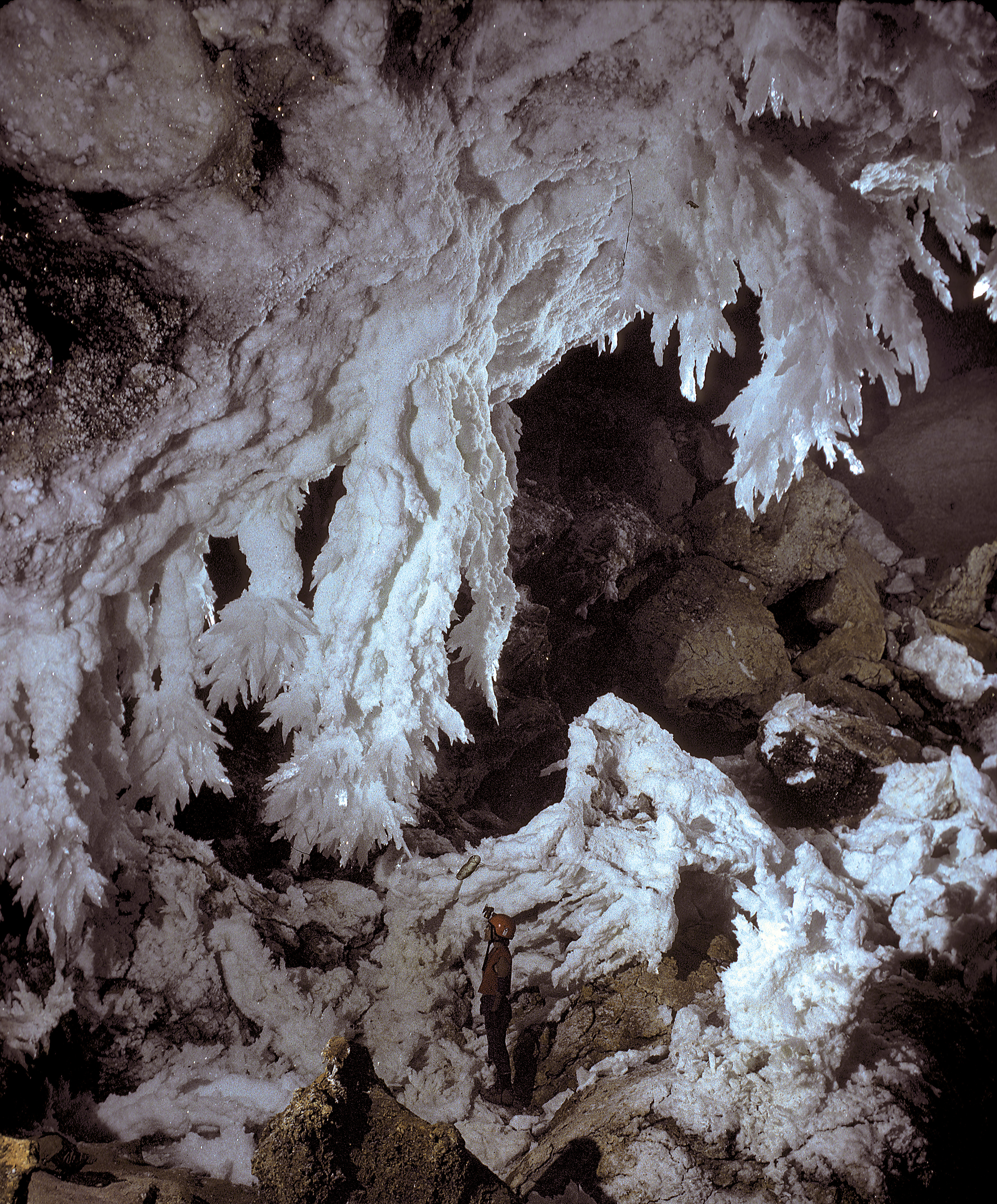
Secondary gypsum formations in Lechuguilla Cave, a sulfuric acid cave.

Sulfuric acid speleogenesis occurs very quickly; large caves can form this way in a few thousand years, 1000 to 2000 times faster than carbonic acid speleogenesis.

=== Microbial mediation ===
Microbes are very important for H_{2}S production in cooler environments where thermal sulfate reduction is not possible, and often leave fingerprints in the form of fractionation of sulfur isotopes; a very low ratio of ^{34}S is characteristic of the microbial sulfate reduction that leads to sulfuric acid formation.

== Signatures ==
=== Stable isotopes ===
==== Sulfur ====
Isotope ratios of sulfur in replacement gypsum and other products of sulfuric acid speleogenesis can indicate its past occurrence.

==== Oxygen ====
Oxygen can be used to determine the origin of the sulfuric waters that led to sulfuric acid speleogenesis.

=== Minerals ===
The formation of secondary gypsum is one of the most common signs of sulfuric acid speleogenesis. Other minerals that frequently form from this process are dolomite, native sulfur, sodium sulfate minerals, other sulfate minerals including celestine, aluminite and alunite, endellite, and tyuyamunite.
