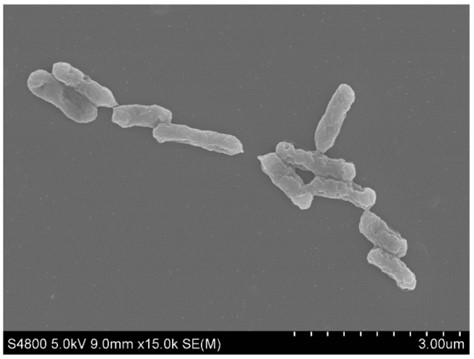
- Acidithiobacillus ferrooxidans

Scientific classification
- Domain: Bacteria
- Kingdom: Pseudomonadati
- Phylum: Pseudomonadota
- Class: Acidithiobacillia
- Order: Acidithiobacillales
- Family: Acidithiobacillaceae
- Genus: Acidithiobacillus

Species
- Acidithiobacillus albertensis Acidithiobacillus caldus Acidithiobacillus cuprithermicus Acidithiobacillus ferrianus Acidithiobacillus ferridurans Acidithiobacillus ferriphilus Acidithiobacillus ferrivorans Acidithiobacillus ferrooxidans Acidithiobacillus sulfuriphilus Acidithiobacillus thiooxidans

= Acidithiobacillus =

Genus of bacteria

Acidithiobacillus is a genus of the Acidithiobacillia in the phylum "Pseudomonadota". This genus includes ten species of acidophilic microorganisms capable of sulfur and/or iron oxidation: Acidithiobacillus albertensis, Acidithiobacillus caldus, Acidithiobacillus cuprithermicus, Acidithiobacillus ferrianus, Acidithiobacillus ferridurans, Acidithiobacillus ferriphilus, Acidithiobacillus ferrivorans, Acidithiobacillus ferrooxidans, Acidithiobacillus sulfuriphilus, and Acidithiobacillus thiooxidans. A. ferooxidans is the most widely studied of the genus, but A. caldus and A. thiooxidans are also significant in research. Like all "Pseudomonadota", Acidithiobacillus spp. are Gram-negative and non-spore forming. They also play a significant role in the generation of acid mine drainage, a major global environmental challenge within the mining industry. Some species of Acidithiobacillus are utilized in bioleaching and biomining. A portion of the genes that support the survival of these bacteria in acidic environments are presumed to have been obtained by horizontal gene transfer.

== Genus Acidithiobacillus ==
Acidithiobacillus are chemolithoautotrophs that can occur as acidophilic, mesophilic, or mesothermophilic. Acidithiobacillus caldus can also grow mixotrophically. Currently, the genus comprises ten species which are capable of obtaining energy by oxidizing sulfur compounds, with certain species also utilizing both ferrous and ferric iron. Some species have also evolved to use hydrogen and nitrogen from the environment. They assimilate carbon from carbon dioxide using the transaldolase variant of the Calvin-Benson-Bassham cycle. The genus comprises motile, rod-shaped cells that can be isolated from low pH environments including low pH microenvironments on otherwise neutral mineral grains.

== Phylogeny ==
The order Acidithiobacillales (i.e. Thermithiobacillus) were formerly members of the Gammaproteobacteria, with considerable debate regarding their position and that they could also fall within the Betaproteobacteria, but the situation was resolved by whole-genome alignment studies and both genera have been reclassified to the new class Acidithiobacillia.

Some members of this genus were classified as Thiobacillus spp., before they were reclassified in 2000.

- Acidithiobacillus ferrooxidans (basonym Thiobacillus ferrooxidans) can be isolated from iron-sulfur minerals such as pyrite deposits, oxidising iron and sulfur as energy sources to support autotrophic growth and producing ferric iron and sulfuric acid.
- Acidithiobacillus thiooxidans (basonym Thiobacillus thiooxidans, Thiobacillus concretivorus) oxidises sulfur and produces sulfuric acid; first isolated from the soil, it has also been observed causing biogenic sulfide corrosion of concrete sewer pipes by altering hydrogen sulfide in sewage gas into sulfuric acid.

== Bioleaching ==
Species within Acidothiobacillus are used in the biohydrometallurgy industry in methods called bioleaching and biomining, whereby metals are extracted from their ores through bacterial oxidation. Biomining uses radioactive waste as an ore with the bacteria to obtain gold, platinum, polonium, radon, radium, uranium, neptunium, americium, nickel, manganese, bromine, mercury, and their isotopes.

Acidithiobacillus ferrooxidans has emerged as an economically significant bacterium in the field of biohydrometallurgy, in the leaching of sulfide ores since its discovery in 1950 by Colmer, Temple and Hinkle. The discovery of A. ferrooxidans led to the development of biohydrometallurgy, which deals with all aspects of microbial mediated extraction of metals from minerals or solid wastes and acid mine drainage. A. ferrooxidans has been proven as a potent leaching organism, for dissolution of metals from low-grade sulfide ores. Recently, the attention has been focused upon the treatment of mineral concentrates, as well as complex sulfide ores using batch or continuous-flow reactors.

Acidithiobacillus ferrooxidans is commonly found in acid mine drainage and mine tailings. The oxidation of ferrous iron and reduced sulfur oxyanions, metal sulfides and elementary sulfur results in the production of ferric sulfate in sulfuric acid, this in turn causes the solubilization of metals and other compounds. As a result, A. ferrooxidans may be of interest for bioremediation processes. Acidithiobacillus is also commonly abundant upon inner surfaces of sewers in areas exhibiting corrosion; genetic sequencing identifies Acidothiobacillus thiooxidans as the usual species present, although it is occasionally absent from such locations.

== Morphology ==
Acidithiobacillus spp. occur as single cells or occasionally in pairs or chains, depending on growth conditions. Highly motile species have been described, as well as nonmotile ones. Motile strains have a single flagellum with the exception of A. albertensis, which has a tuft of polar flagella and a glycocalyx. Nitrogen fixation also is an important ecological function carried out by some species in this genus, as is growth using molecular hydrogen as a source of energy - neither property is found in every species. Ferric iron can be used by some species as a terminal electron acceptor.

== Evolution ==
Acidithiobacillus spp. are known to inhabit diverse environments such as hot springs, acid mine drainage (abandoned mine drainage) or mine tailings, acidic soils, and sulfidic caves. Terrestrial hot springs are currently an important research focus as they can provide known limiting conditions for the genus, but host microbial communities in which Acidithiobacillus are sometimes present. Optimum pH conditions for these bacteria vary among species, but some have been observed at the genus level in pH conditions as high as 8.94 and temperatures as high as 97.6 °C. All species of Acidithiobacillus can grow under pH and temperature conditions between 0.5 and 6.0, and 5 °C to 52 °C. They are highly tolerant of heavy metals and can flourish in environments where high concentrations of these metals are present. To obtain energy, they have evolved to couple sulfur oxidation to molecular oxygen but can also use other resources around them as electron donors or acceptors. They have adapted to living in these environments through horizontal gene transfer, but the basis by which they can survive in low pH environments likely evolved through vertical gene transfer. It is probable that the foundational genes of acid resistance in Acidithiobacillus were first inherited from a neutrophile, possibly thermophilic, and throughout their evolutionary history further acid resistance genes were obtained from neighboring acidophiles. While the trait of sulfur oxidation is ubiquitous among the genus, iron oxidation is specific to A. ferrooxidans, A. ferridurans, A. ferriphilus, A. ferrivorans, and A. ferrianus. The transition to modern day Acidithiobacillus spp. has occurred over hundred of millions of years involving events of gene gain and gene loss. Some evidence points to the most recent common ancestor of Acidithiobacillus appearing around the same time as A. caldus, 800 million years ago.

Acidithiobacillus is a significantly diverse genus, species have adapted to survive in differing environments under varying limitations such as acidity, temperature, and nutrient availability. For example A. caldus, which is the only known thermoacidophile of the genus, is adept to survive in extreme temperatures up to 52 °C, while A. ferrooxidans can survive under extremely acidic conditions with pH <1. Metabolic traits of the Acidithiobacillia class include the presence of enzymes which aid in the use of hydrogen sulfide, elemental sulfur, thiosulfate, and tetrathionate in sulfur metabolism. Species capable of iron oxidation also possess genes that are coded for nitrogen fixation and hydrogen utilization. The diversity in genomic composition allows these same species to inhabit both aerobic and anaerobic environments.

== See also ==
- Talvivaara mine
- Thiobacillus
- Thermithiobacillus
- Acidophiles in acid mine drainage
