= Thermithiobacillus =

Scientific classification
- Domain: Bacteria
- Kingdom: Pseudomonadati
- Phylum: Pseudomonadota
- Class: Acidithiobacillia
- Order: Acidithiobacillales
- Family: Thermithiobacillaceae
- Genus: Thermithiobacillus

Species
- Thermithiobacillus tepidarius; Thermithiobacillus plumbiphilus

Genus of bacteria

Thermithiobacillus is a genus of nonsporeforming, rod-shaped, Gram-negative bacteria. The name derives from the Latin thermae, for warm baths, and the Classical Greek θείος, theios for sulfur. The type species of this genus was previously assigned to the genus Thiobacillus, but it was reclassified on the basis of 16S rRNA analysis in 2000, creating this genus.

A phylogenetic analysis, using 98 protein families confirmed this reassignment. This chemolithoautotrophic genus is obligately aerobic and moderately thermophilic (43-45 °C). The type species is Thermithiobacillus tepidarius. A second species, Thermithiobacillus plumbiphilus, was published in 2016.
