= Biomining =

Technique of extracting metals from ores using prokaryotes or fungi

Biomining refers to processes that use organisms to extract metals from ores and other solid materials. The largest application currently being used is the treatment of mining waste containing iron, copper, zinc, and gold. It may also be useful in maximizing the yields of increasingly low grade ore deposits. Biomining has been proposed as a relatively environmentally friendly alternative and/or supplementation to traditional mining. Current methods of biomining are modified leach mining processes. These aptly named bioleaching processes most commonly includes the inoculation of extracted rock with bacteria and acidic solution, with the leachate salvaged and processed for the metals of value. Aspirational applications include space biomining, fungal bioleaching and biomining with hybrid biomaterials.

Biomining is related to biohydrometallurgy, a subset or specialized form of hydrometallurgy, which refers to the use of aqueous solutions for metal extraction through a series of chemical reactions. In biohydrometallurgy, the aqueous solutions contain biological agents (bacteria), which assist in the recovery of metals. Bioleaching is closely related to biohydrometallurgy. It focuses on extraction or liberation of metals from their ores through the use of living organisms. Relative to traditional forms of metallurgy, biohydrometallurgy or bioleaching is slow but in principle low cost. These techniques are mainly applied to recovery of copper and gold from low-grade ores. These techniques have been proposed to the extraction of uranium, nickel, and other metals.

== History ==
The possibility of using microorganisms in biomining applications was realized after the 1951 paper by Kenneth Temple and Arthur Colmer. In the paper the authors presented evidence that the bacteria Acidithiobacillus ferrooxidans (basonym Thiobacillus ferrooxidans) is an iron oxidizer that thrive in iron, copper and magnesium-rich environments. In the experiment, A. ferrooxidans was inoculated into media containing between 2,000 and 26,000 ppm ferrous iron, finding that the bacteria grew faster and were more motile in the high iron concentrations. The byproducts of the bacterial growth caused the media to turn very acidic, in which the microorganisms still thrived. Following this experiment, the potential to use fungi to leach metals from their environment and use microorganisms to take up radioactive elements like uranium and thorium have also been explored.

While the 1960s was when industrial biomining got its start, humans have been unknowingly using biomining practices for hundreds of years. In western Europe the practice of extracting copper from metallic iron by placing it into drainage streams, used to be considered an act of alchemy. However, today we know that it is a fairly simple chemical reaction.

Cu^{2+} + Fe^{0} → Cu^{0} + Fe^{2+}

In the Middle Ages in Portugal, Spain and Wales, miners unknowingly used this reaction to their advantage when they discovered that when flooding deep mine shafts for a period with some leftover iron they were able to obtain copper.

In China, the use of biomining techniques has been documented as early as 6th-7th century BC. The relationship between water and ore to produce copper was well documented, and during the Tang dynasty and Song dynasty copper was produced using hydrometallurgical techniques. Though the mechanism of oxidation via bacteria was not understood, the unintended use of biomining allowed copper production in China to reach 1000 Tons per year.

Biomining was first used more than 300 years ago to recover copper. Early work on copper bioleaching was carried out at the mines of Chuquicamata and Lo Aguirre in Chile.

== Mechanism ==
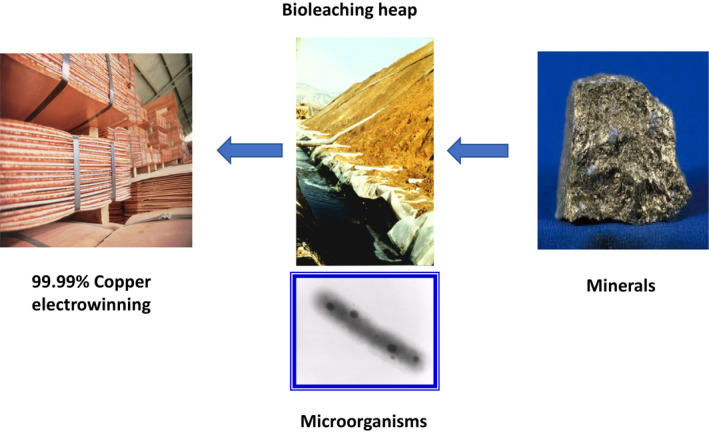
A Simplified scheme illustrating bioleaching of copper from its ore chalcopyrite

The processes often involve the use ferric ions (Fe^{3+}) for oxidation of sulfide minerals. The organisms that promote these reactions tolerate high metal concentrations and low pH:

CuFeS_{2}+4H^{+}+O_{2} → Cu^{2+}+Fe^{2+}+2S^{0}+2H_{2}O

4Fe^{2+} + 4H^{+} + O_{2} → 4Fe^{3+} + 2H_{2}O

2S^{0} + 3O_{2}+2H_{2}O → 2 SO^{2-}_{4} + 4H^{+},

CuFeS_{2} + 4Fe^{3+} → Cu^{2+} + 2 S^{0} + 5 Fe^{2+}

== Bioleaching technologies ==
=== Direct vs indirect leaching ===
Biohydrometallurgy can be productively implemented in two ways: direct and indirect leaching. Direct leaching entails physical contact between the ore and the microbe. The sulfide ore serves as an electron donor, which supplies energy to the organisms when coupled to the reduction of oxygen. Many sulfide ores are susceptible to direct leaching: covelite (CuS), chalcocite (Cu_{2}S), galena (PbS), molybdenite (MoS_{2}), and more. The energy producing conversion can be represented:

MS + 2 O_{2} → MSO_{4}

"Indirect leaching" requires no physical contact between the organism and the sulfide mineral. Here, the bacteria produce Fe^{3+} (ferric) ions, which can be viewed as the lixiviant. Ferric ions attack the sulfide (usually) ore. The general equation for the solubilization of a metal sulfide ore is:

MS + Fe_{2}(SO_{4})_{3} + O_{2} → 2 FeSO_{4} +MSO_{4} + S

Here the target of the biomining is M, often copper. The bacteria can then promote the re-oxidation of ferrous by air and the oxidation of sulfur-containing products to sulfuric acid.

The oxidation of the pyrite is of particular interest in gold recovery for gold-containing pyrite (and related "pyritic" minerals). The goal here is to solubilize pyrite using air:

FeS_{2} + O_{2} + 2 H_{2}O → FeSO_{4} + 2 H_{2}SO_{4}

In terms of mechanism, an early step entails oxidation of pyrite to thiosulfate by ferric ion (Fe^{3+}), which in turn is reduced to give ferrous ion (Fe^{2+}). Thiosulfate is also oxidized by air to give sulfate:

S_{2}O^{2−}_{3} + 2 O_{2} + H_{2}O → 2HSO^{−}_{4}

The oxidation of the ferrous ion by air is promoted by bacteria:

4 FeSO_{4} + O_{2} + 2 H_{2}SO_{4} → 2Fe_{2}(SO_{4})_{3} + 2 H_{2}O

Thus the roles of the bacteria are the oxidations of the ferrous and thiosulfate. As a practical matter, the bacteria require nutrients such as ammonium and phosphate.

The sulfate salts are metal aquo complexes, not anhydrous as depicted.

Similar reactions apply to the proposed leaching of nickel ions from pentlandite ores and uranium from UO2-containing ores.

=== Heap or dump leaching ===
Bioleaching was one of the first widely used applications of biomining. It is practiced in two broad venues:

- rock is treated with an extractant (lixiviant), which percolates through the solid and the metals are recovered from the leachate.
  - Dump bioleaching, waste rock is piled into mounds (>100m tall) and saturated with sulfuric acid to encourage mineral oxidation from native bacteria. Inoculation of the rock with bacteria is often not performed in dump bioleaching which instead relies on the bacteria already present in the rock.
  - Heap bioleaching is a newer take on dump leaching. The process includes more processing in which the rocks are ground into a finer grain size. This finer grain is then stacked only 2 – 10 m high and is well irrigated allowing for plenty of oxygen and carbon dioxide to reach the bacteria. The mounds are also often inoculated with bacteria. The liquid coming out at the bottom of the pile, called leachate, is rich in the processed mineral. The heaps reside on non-porous platforms which catch the leachate for processing. Once collected the leachate is transported to a precipitation plant where the metal is reprecipitated and purified. The waste liquid, now void of the valuable minerals, can be pumped back to the top of the pile and the cycle is repeated.

The temperature inside the leach dump often rises spontaneously as a result of microbial activities. Thus, thermophilic iron-oxidizing chemolithotrophs such as thermophilic Acidithiobacillus species and Leptospirillum and at even higher temperatures the thermoacidophilic archaeon Sulfolobus (Metallosphaera sedula) may become important in the leaching process above 40 °C.

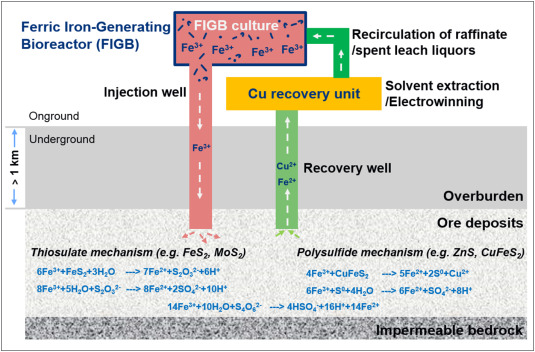
In situ copper biomining of and electro-winning for recovery from Kupferschiefer deposits

=== Stirred tank ===
A major alternative to heap or dump leaching is continuously stirred tank reactor (STR). Alternatives include the airlift reactor (ALR) or pneumatic reactor (PR) of the Pachuca type to extract the low concentration mineral resources efficiently.

=== In situ biomining ===
In situ biomining involves the flooding and inoculation of fractured ore bodies that have yet to be removed from the ground. Once the bacteria are introduced to the ore deposits, they begin leaching the precious metals, which can then be extracted as leachate with a recovery well. In-situ mining also shows promise for applications in cost-effective deep subsurface extraction of metals.

In situ biomining, is the one current method utilizing bioleaching that serves as an effective and viable replacement for traditional mining. Because in-situ biomining, negates the need for the extraction of the ore bodies, this method stops the need for hauling or smelting of the ore. This would mean there would be no waste rocks or mineral tailings that contaminate the surface. In-situ biomining poses environmental challenges, such as the contamination of ground water.

== Applications ==
=== Gold ===
Bioleaching from pyritic ores (pyrite, marcasite, arsenopyrite) utilize iron- and sulfur-oxidizing bacteria, including Acidithiobacillus ferrooxidans (formerly known as Thiobacillus ferrooxidans) and Acidithiobacillus thiooxidans (formerly known as Thiobacillus thiooxidans). There is no interest in obtaining iron salts from this kind of treatment. Rather, traces of precious metals such as gold may be liberated in the process since tiny particles of gold are often associated with pyrite. Sulfuric acid is produced in the processing of these pyritic ores, using indirect leaching. Plants for biooxidation of gold-bearing concentrates have been operated at 40 °C with mixed cultures of Leptospirillum ferrooxidans or of the genera Acidithiobacillus. Gold is frequently found in nature associated with arsenopyrite and pyrite. In the microbial leaching process Acidithiobacillus ferrooxidans, etc. dissolve these minerals, exposing trapped gold (Au). The following reaction summarizes the process:

2 FeAsS[Au] + 7 O_{2} + 2 H_{2}O + H_{2}SO_{4} → Fe_{2}(SO_{4})_{3} + 2 H_{3}AsO_{4} + [Au]

=== Copper ores ===
One of the largest applications of these leaching methods is in the mining of copper. Acidithiobacillus ferrooxidans has the ability to solubilize copper from its sulfidic ores. The acidophilic archaea Sulfolobus metallicus and Metallosphaera sedula can tolerate up to 4% of copper. The main application is for extraction from low grade ores using Thiobacillus thiooxidans. – an important consideration in the face of the depletion of high grade ores.

The copper can then be recovered from the solution by plating it out on scrap iron or electrowinning.

Fe^{0} + Cu^{2+} → Cu^{0} + Fe^{2+}

The main copper mineral chalcopyrite (CuFeS_{2}) is not leached very efficiently. Instead, the dominant technology remains flotation. The leaching of CuFeS_{2} proceeds according the route indicated for indirect leaching above.

=== Uranium ===
Bioleaching of non-sulfidic ores such as pitchblende also uses ferric iron as an oxidant (e.g., UO_{2} + 2 Fe^{3+} ==> UO_{2}^{2+} + 2 Fe^{2+}). In this case, the purpose of the bacterial step is the regeneration of Fe^{3+}. Sulfidic iron ores can be added to speed up the process and provide a source of iron. Bioleaching of non-sulfidic ores by layering of waste sulfides and elemental sulfur, colonized by Acidithiobacillus spp., has been demonstrated, which provides a strategy for accelerated leaching of materials that do not contain sulfide minerals.

Biomining was used in Canada in the 1970s to extract additional uranium out of exploited mines. As in the biomining of copper, Acidithiobacillus ferrooxidans can oxidize U^{4+} to U^{6+} with O_{2} as electron acceptor. However, it is likely that the uranium leaching process depends more on the chemical oxidation of uranium by Fe^{3+}, with At. ferrooxidans contributing mainly through the reoxidation of Fe^{2+} to Fe^{3+}.

UO_{2} + Fe_{2}(SO_{4})_{3} → UO_{2}SO_{4} + 2 FeSO_{4}

== Aspirational themes ==
Additional capabilities, of current bioleaching technologies include the bioleaching of metals from sulfide ores, phosphate ores, and concentrating of metals from solution. For example, the bioleaching of cobalt mine tailings has been investigated using stirred tanks.

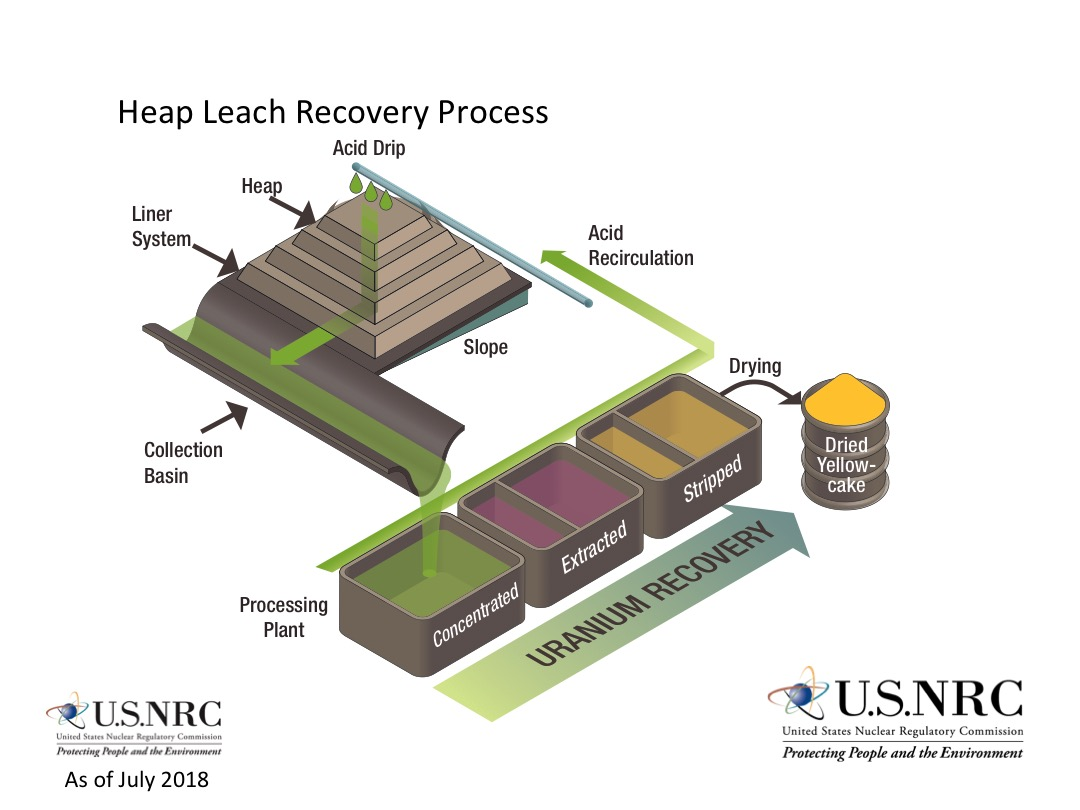
Illustration of the process of uranium heap leaching. In bioleaching, the heap would have been inoculated with the process specific microbe.

=== Coal desulfurization ===
Biological methods have shown some promise for the removal of sulfur from coal, giving a cleaner-burning fuel. This concept has not progressed beyond demonstration phase, however.

=== Biomining in space ===
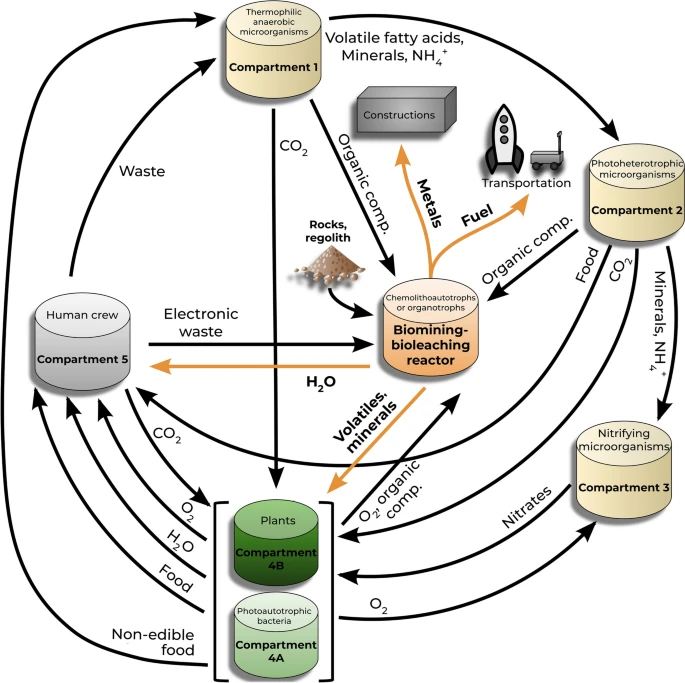
Theoretical map of space biomining/bioleaching based biological life support system (BLSS)

Microorganisms could be employed to mine extraterrestrially.

Space biomining is at the conceptual stage. Bioleaching in space also shows promise for application in building biological life support systems (BLSS). BLSS do not usually contain biological component, however, the use of microorganisms to breakdown waste and regolith, while being able to capture their byproducts like nitrates and methane would theoretically allow for a cyclical system of regenerative life support.

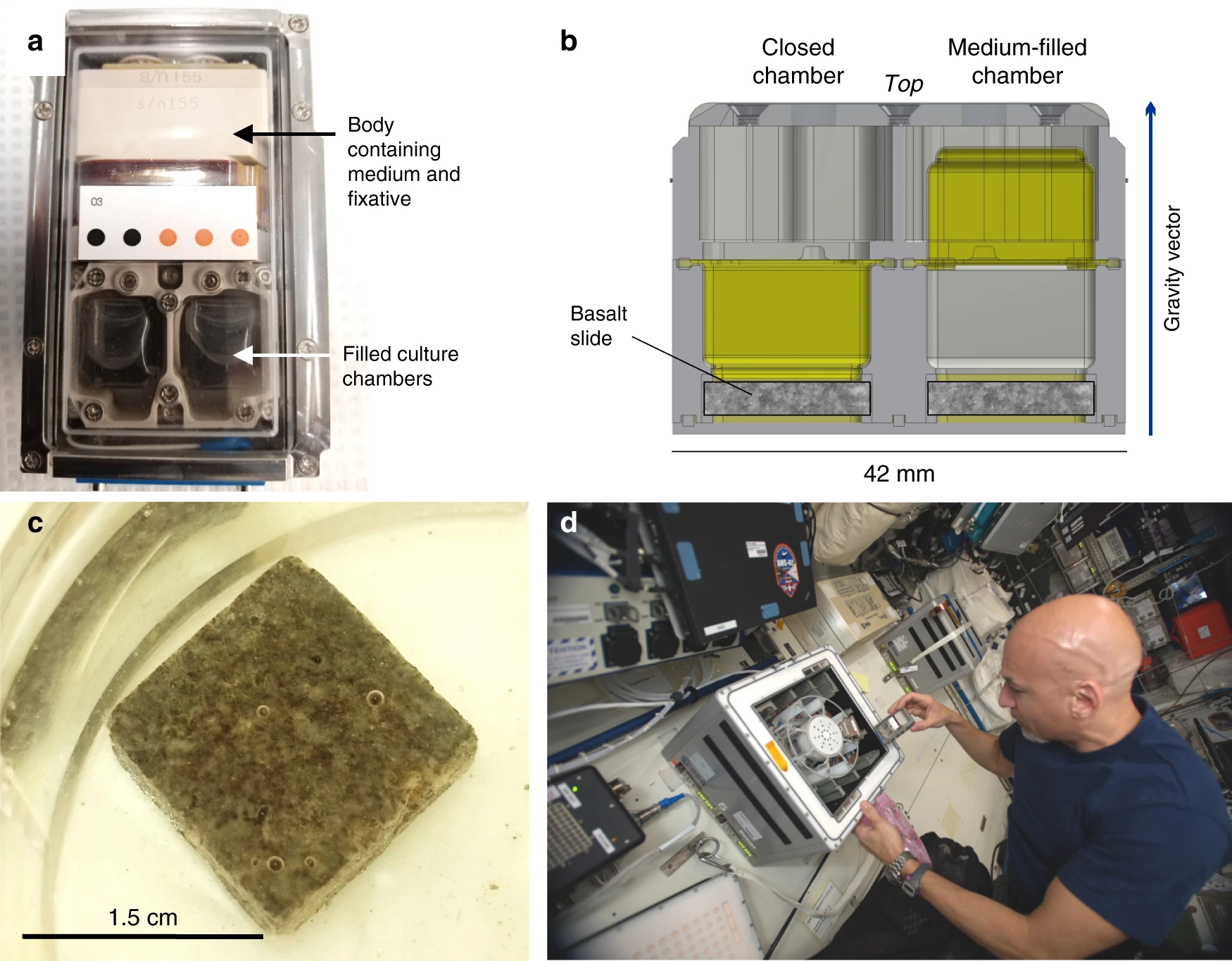
The experimental unit of the experiment

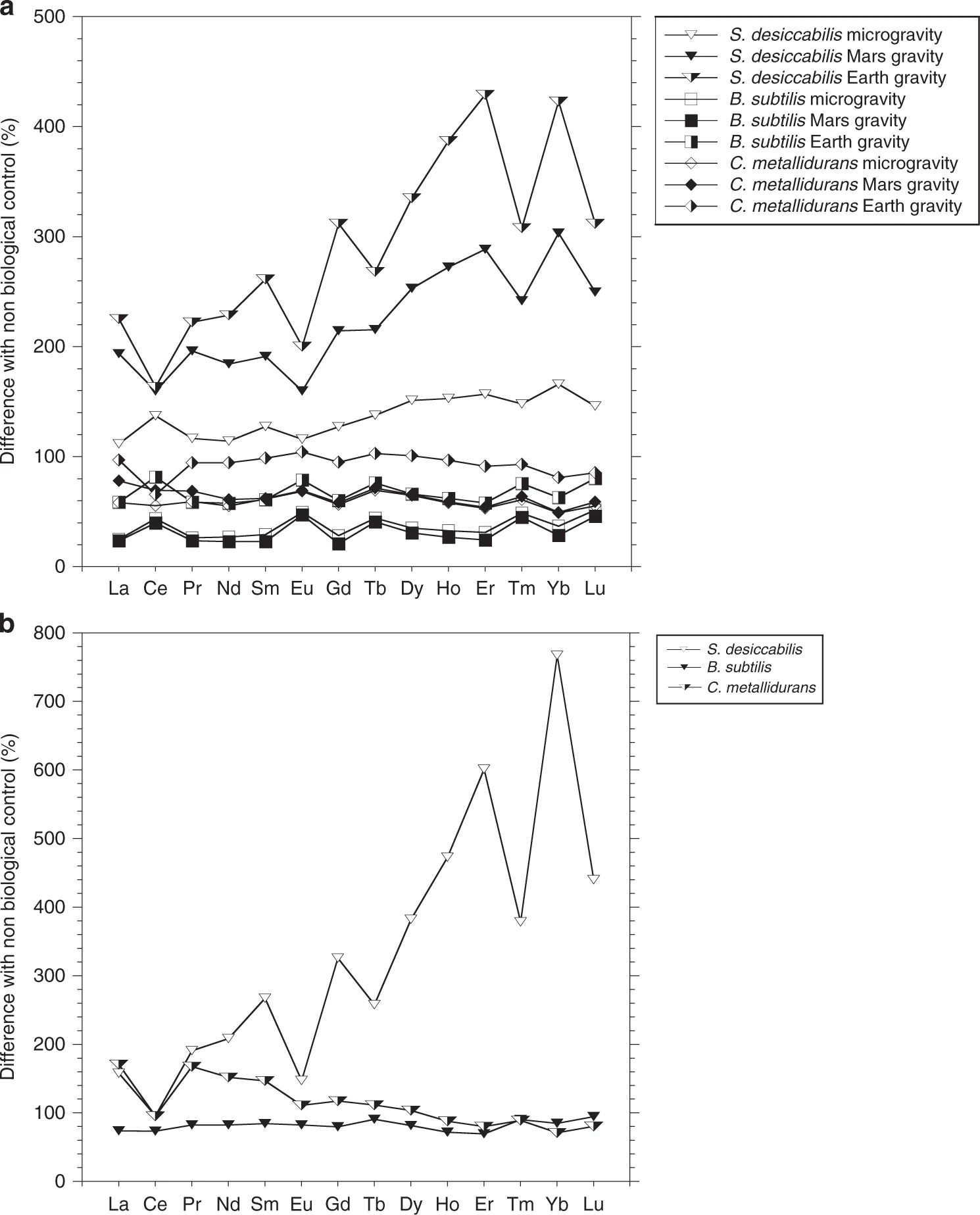
S. desiccabilis is a microorganisms that showed high efficacy

=== Fungi in biomining ===
Fungi and plants (phytoextraction also known as phytomining) may also be used. Species of filamentous fungi, specifically those in the genera of Aspergillus and Penicillium have been shown as effective bioleaching agents. Fungi have the ability to solubilize metals through acidolysis, redoxolysis and chelation reactions. Like bacteria, fungi have been studied for their ability to extract rare earth elements and to process low grade ore. But their most promising and studied usage is in the breakdown of E-waste and the recovery of valuable metals from it, like gold. Despite the promise of fungal bioleaching, there has been no industrial applications of it as it does not out compete its bacterial counterparts.

Fungi can be grown on many substrates, such as electronic scrap, catalytic converters, and fly ash from municipal waste incineration. Experiments have shown that two fungal strains (Aspergillus niger, Penicillium simplicissimum) were able to mobilize Cu and Sn by 65%, and Al, Ni, Pb, and Zn by more than 95%. Aspergillus niger can produce some organic acids such as citric acid. This form of leaching does not rely on microbial oxidation of metal but rather uses microbial metabolism as source of acids that directly dissolve the metal.

== Economic feasibility and potential drawbacks ==
As a complement to traditional mining, biomining allows for extraction of some low-grade ore and mine tailings. The approach is environmentally appealing, however the Finnish Talvivaara project proved to be environmentally and economically disastrous.

== See also ==
- Bacterial oxidation
- Metallurgy
- Biotechnology
- Phytomining
- Phytoextraction
- Bioremediation
- Bioleaching
