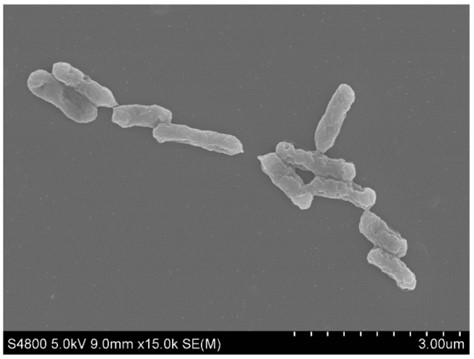
- Acidithiobacillus ferrooxidans

Scientific classification
- Domain: Bacteria
- Kingdom: Pseudomonadati
- Phylum: Pseudomonadota
- Class: Acidithiobacillia; Williams & Kelly 2013
- Order: Acidithiobacillales; Garrity et al. 2005

Families and genera
- Acidithiobacillaceae; Acidithiobacillus; Thermithiobacillaceae; Thermithiobacillus

Synonyms
- "Acidithiobacillidae" Cavalier-Smith 2020

= Acidithiobacillia =

Class of bacteria

Acidithiobacillia is a class of the phylum Pseudomonadota ("Proteobacteria"). Its type order, the Acidithiobacillales, was formerly classified within the Gammaproteobacteria, and comprises two families of sulfur-oxidising autotrophs, the Acidithiobacillaceae and the Thermithiobacillaceae, which in turn include the genera Acidithiobacillus and Thermithiobacillus. The Acidithiobacillales are an order of bacteria within the class Acidithiobacillia and comprises the genera Acidithiobacillus and Thermithiobacillus. Originally, both were included in the genus Thiobacillus, but they are not related to the type species, which belongs to the Betaproteobacteria.

Acidithiobacilia is part of the acidophilic bacteria family. Acidithiobacilia's metabolic activity is important because it is relied on for an approach for metal recovery from ores, called microorganism-mediated biohydrometallurgy. Acidithiobacilia and family of bacteria are active players in the sulfur and iron biogeochemical cycles in extremely acidic environments and drivers of the leaching of mineral ores contributing to acid rock/mine drainage and industrial bioleaching.
