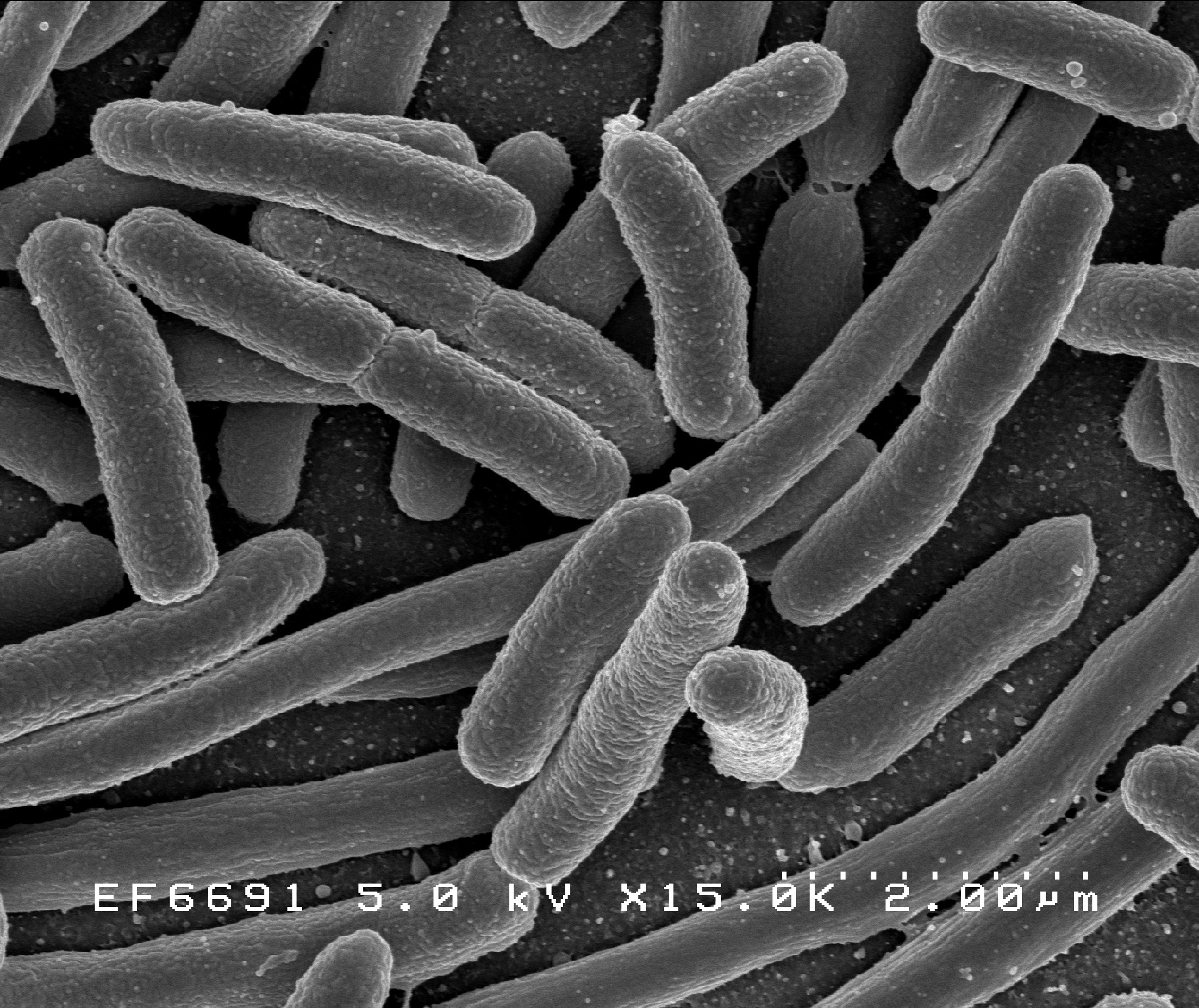
- Escherichia coli

Scientific classification
- Domain: Bacteria
- Kingdom: Pseudomonadati
- Phylum: Pseudomonadota; Garrity et al. 2021

Classes
- Acidithiobacillia; Alphaproteobacteria; "Anaeropigmentatia"; Betaproteobacteria; Gammaproteobacteria; Hydrogenophilalia; Magnetococcia; Zetaproteobacteria

Synonyms
- "Proteobacteria" Stackebrandt et al. 1988; "Proteobacteria" Gray and Herwig 1996; "Proteobacteria" Garrity et al. 2005; "Proteobacteria" Cavalier-Smith 2002; "Alphaproteobacteraeota" Oren et al. 2015; "Alphaproteobacteriota" Whitman et al. 2018; "Caulobacterota" corrig. Garrity et al. 2021; "Neoprotei" Pelletier 2012; "Rhodobacteria" Cavalier-Smith 2002

= Pseudomonadota =

Phylum of Gram-negative bacteria

Pseudomonadota (synonym "Proteobacteria") is a major phylum of gram-negative bacteria. They include both pathogenic and free-living (non-parasitic) genera. The phylum comprises six classes: Acidithiobacillia, Alphaproteobacteria, Betaproteobacteria, Gammaproteobacteria, Hydrogenophilia, and Zetaproteobacteria. Pseudomonadota are very diverse, with differences in morphology, metabolic processes, relevance to humans, and ecological influence.

== Classification ==
American microbiologist Carl Woese established this grouping in 1987, calling it informally the "purple bacteria and their relatives". The group was later formally named Proteobacteria after the Greek god Proteus, who was known to assume many forms. In 2021, the International Committee on Systematics of Prokaryotes designated the synonym Pseudomonadota as part of a move to rename several phyla. This renaming remains controversial among microbiologists, many of whom continue to use the name Proteobacteria, which has a lot of precedent in the literature. The phylum includes a wide variety of pathogenic genera, such as Escherichia, Salmonella, Vibrio, Yersinia, Legionella, and many others. Others are free-living (non-parasitic) and include many of the bacteria responsible for nitrogen fixation.

Previously, the Pseudomonadota phylum included two additional classes, namely Deltaproteobacteria and Oligoflexia. However, further investigation into the phylogeny of these taxa through genomic marker analysis indicated their separation from the Pseudomonadota phylum. Deltaproteobacteria has been identified as a diverse taxonomic unit, leading to a proposal for its reclassification into distinct phyla: Desulfobacterota, Myxococcota, and Bdellovibrionota.

The class Epsilonproteobacteria was additionally identified within the Pseudomonadota phylum. This class is characterized by its significance as chemolithotrophic primary producers and its metabolic prowess in deep-sea hydrothermal vent ecosystems. Noteworthy pathogenic genera within this class include Campylobacter, Helicobacter, and Arcobacter. Analysis of phylogenetic tree topology and genetic markers revealed the direct divergence of Epsilonproteobacteria from the Pseudomonadota phylum. Limited outgroup data and low bootstrap values support these discoveries. Despite further investigations, consensus has not been reached regarding the monophyletic nature of Epsilonproteobacteria within Proteobacteria, prompting researchers to propose its taxonomic separation from the phylum. The proposed reclassification of the name Epsilonproteobacteria is Epsilonbacteraeota, later revised to Campylobacterota in 2018.

== Taxonomy ==
The currently accepted taxonomy is based on the List of Prokaryotic names with Standing in Nomenclature (LPSN) and National Center for Biotechnology Information (NCBI).

The group Pseudomonadota is defined based on ribosomal RNA (rRNA) sequencing, and are divided into several subclasses. These subclasses were regarded as such for many years, but are now treated as various classes of the phylum. These classes are monophyletic. The genus Acidithiobacillus, part of the Gammaproteobacteria until it was transferred to class Acidithiobacillia in 2013, was previously regarded as paraphyletic to the Betaproteobacteria according to multigenome alignment studies. In 2017, the Betaproteobacteria was subject to major revisions and the class Hydrogenophilalia was created to contain the order Hydrogenophilales

Pseudomonadota classes with validly published names include some prominent genera: e.g.:

- Acidithiobacillia: Acidithiobacillus, Thermithiobacillus
- Alphaproteobacteria: Brucella, Rhizobium, Agrobacterium, Caulobacter, Rickettsia, Wolbachia, etc.
- Betaproteobacteria: Bordetella, Ralstonia, Neisseria, Nitrosomonas, etc.
- Gammaproteobacteria: Escherichia, Shigella, Salmonella, Yersinia, Buchnera, Haemophilus, Vibrio, Pseudomonas, Pasteurella, etc.
- Zetaproteobacteria: Mariprofundus

according to iTOL, Bergey's
and others.

- - Alphaproteobacteria
  - - Zetaproteobacteria
    - - Gammaproteobacteria
      - Betaproteobacteria
      - Hydrogenophilalia

16S rRNA based LTP_10_2024

- - - other
    - - other
      - - "Caulobacterota" ("Alphaproteobacteriota")
          "Caulobacteria" (Alphaproteobacteria)
  - - other
    - - "Chromatibacteria"
        - - - Thiohalorhabdales
            - - Magnetococcia
              - "Mariprofundia" (Zetaproteobacteria)
          - - Methylohalomonadales
            - - Thiohalomonadales
              - - Thiomicrospirales
                - - Hydrogenophilalia
                  - Betaproteobacteria
        - "Pseudomonadia" (Gammaproteobacteria
          and nested Acidithiobacillia)

120 marker proteins based GTDB 09-RS220

- - - "Caulobacteria" (Alphaproteobacteria)
      - Clade 1
      - - "Rickettsiidae"
        - "Caulobacteridae"
  - - "Mariprofundia" (Zetaproteobacteria)
    - - Magnetococcia
      - - "Pseudomonadia"
          - "Neisseriidae" (Betaproteobacteria
            & nested Hydrogenophilalia)
          - "Pseudomonadidae" (Gammaproteobacteria
            & nested Acidithiobacillia)

== Characteristics ==
Pseudomonadota are a diverse group of bacteria. Though some species may stain Gram-positive or Gram-variable in the laboratory, they are nominally Gram-negative. Their unique outer membrane is mainly composed of lipopolysaccharides, which helps differentiate them from the Gram-positive species. Most Pseudomonadota are motile and move using flagella, but some are nonmotile, or rely on bacterial gliding.

Pseudomonadota also have a wide variety of metabolisms. Most are facultative or obligate anaerobes, chemolithoautotrophs, and heterotrophs, though numerous exceptions exist. A variety of distantly related genera within the Pseudomonadota obtain their energy from light through oxygenic photosynthesis or anoxygenic photosynthesis.

The Acidithiobacillia consist of sulfur, iron, and uranium-oxidizing autotrophs.The class includes five different Acidithiobacillus species used in the mining industry. In particular, these microbes assist with the process of bioleaching, which involves microbes assisting in metal extraction from mining waste that typical extraction methods cannot remove.

Some Alphaproteobacteria can grow at very low nutrient levels and have unusual morphology within their life cycles. The Caulobacterales form stalks to help with colonization, and form buds during cell division. Others include agriculturally important bacteria capable of inducing nitrogen fixation in symbiosis with plants.The mitochondria of eukaryotes are thought to be descendants of an alphaproteobacterium.

The Betaproteobacteria are highly metabolically diverse and contain chemolithoautotrophs, photoautotrophs, and generalist heterotrophs. One order, Burkholderiales, comprises an enormous range of metabolic diversity. They include opportunistic pathogens such as the horse pathogen Burkholderia mallei, and Burkholderia cepacia, which causes respiratory tract infections in people with cystic fibrosis.

The Gammaproteobacteria are one of the largest classes in terms of genera, containing approximately 250 genera. The order Pseudomonadales includes the genera Pseudomonas, the nitrogen-fixing Azotobacter, and with many others. Besides being a well-known pathogenic genus, Pseudomonas is also capable of biodegradation of certain materials, like cellulose.

The Hydrogenophilalia are thermophilic chemoheterotrophs and autotrophs. The bacteria typically use hydrogen gas as an electron donor, but can also use reduced sulfuric compounds. Because of this ability, scientists have begun to use certain species of Hydrogenophilalia to remove sulfides that contaminate industrial wastewater systems. The order Hydrogenophilaceae contains the genera Thiobacillus, Petrobacter, Sulfuricella, Hydrogenophilus and Tepidiphilus. Currently, no members of this class have been identified as pathogenic.

The Zetaproteobacteria are the iron-oxidizing neutrophilic chemolithoautotrophs, distributed worldwide in estuaries and marine habitats. This group is successful in its environment due to their microaerophilic nature. Because they require less oxygen than what is present in the atmosphere, they are able to compete with the abiotic iron(II) oxidation that is already occurring in the environment. The only confirmed order for this class is the Mariprofundaceae, which does not contain any known pathogenic species.

== Transformation ==
Transformation, a process in which genetic material passes from one bacterium to another, has been reported in at least 30 species of Pseudomonadota distributed in the classes alpha, beta, and gamma. The best-studied Pseudomonadota with respect to natural genetic transformation are the medically important human pathogens Neisseria gonorrhoeae (class beta), and Haemophilus influenzae (class gamma). Natural genetic transformation is a sexual process involving DNA transfer from one bacterial cell to another through the intervening medium and the integration of the donor sequence into the recipient genome. In pathogenic Pseudomonadota, transformation appears to serve as a DNA repair process that protects the pathogen's DNA from attack by their host's phagocytic defenses that employ oxidative free radicals.

== Habitat ==
Due to the distinctive nature of each of the six classes of Pseudomonadota, this phylum occupies a multitude of habitats. These include:

- Human oral cavity
- Microbial mats in the deep sea
- Marine sediments
- Thermal sulfur springs
- Agricultural soil
- Hydrothermal vents
- Stem nodules of legumes
- Within aphids as endosymbionts
- Gastrointestinal tract of warm-blooded species
- Brackish, estuary waters
- Microbiomes of shrimp and mollusks
- Human vaginal tract
- Potato rhizosphere microbiome

== Significance ==
=== Human health ===
Studies have suggested Pseudomonadota as a relevant signature of disease in the human gastrointestinal (GI) tract, by operating as a marker for microbiota instability. The human gut microbiome consists mainly of four phyla: Firmicutes, Bacteroidetes, Actinobacteria, and Pseudomonadota. Microorganism gut colonization is dynamic from birth to death, with stabilization at the first few years of life, to higher diversity in adults, to reduced diversity in the elderly. The gut microbiome conducts processes like nutrient synthesis, chemical metabolism, and the formation of the gut barrier. Additionally, the gut microbiome facilitates host interactions with its surrounding environment through regulation of nutrient absorption and bacterial intake. In 16s rRNA and metagenome sequencing studies, Proteobacteria have been identified as bacteria that prompts endotoxemia (an inflammatory gut response) and metabolic disorders in human GI tracts. Another study by Michail et al. showed a correlation of microbial composition in children with and without nonalcoholic fatty liver disease (NAFLD), wherein patients with NAFLD have a higher abundance of Gammaproteobacteria than patients without the disease.

Classes Betaproteobacteria and Gammaproteobacteria are prevalent within the human oral cavity, and are markers for good oral health. The oral microbiome consists of 11 habitats, including the tongue dorsum, hard palate, tonsils, throat, saliva, and more. Changes in the oral microbiome are due to endogenous and exogenous factors like host lifestyle, genotype, environment, immune system, and socioeconomic status. Considering diet as a factor, high saturated fatty acid (SAF) content, achieved through poor diet, has been correlated to increased abundance of Betaproteobacteria in the oral cavity.

=== Economic value ===
Pseudomonadota bacteria have a symbiotic or mutualistic association with plant roots, an example being in the rhizomes of potato plants. Because of this symbiotic relationship, farmers have the ability to increase their crop yields. Healthier root systems can lead to better nutrient uptake, improved water retention, increased resistance to diseases and pests, and ultimately higher crop yields per acre.

Members of Pseudomonadota have vast metabolic abilities that allow them to utilize and produce a variety of compounds. Bioleaching, carried out by various Thiobacillus species, is an example of this. Any iron and sulfur oxidizing species has the potential to uncover metals and low-grade ores that conventional mining techniques were unable to extract. At present, they are most often used for recovering copper and uranium, but researchers are looking to expand this field in the future. The downside of this method is that the bacteria produce acidic byproducts that end up in acid mine drainage.

=== Ecological impact ===
Pseudomonadota are microbes commonly found within soil systems, and play a crucial role in the surrounding ecosystem by performing functions such as nutrient cycling, carbon dioxide fixation, decomposition, and nitrogen fixation. Pseudomonadota can be described as phototrophs, heterotrophs, and lithotrophs. As heterotrophs (examples Pseudomonas and Xanthomonas) these bacteria are effective in breaking down organic matter, contributing to nutrient cycling. Photolithotrophs within the phylum are able to perform photosynthesis using sulfide or elemental sulfur as electron donors, which enables them to participate in carbon fixation and oxygen production even in anaerobic conditions. These Pseudomonadota bacteria are also considered copiotrophic organisms, meaning they can be found in environments with high nutrient availability, such as fertile soils, compost, and sewage.

== See also ==
- List of bacteria genera
- List of bacterial orders
