= Hydrothermal vent microbial communities =

Undersea unicellular organisms

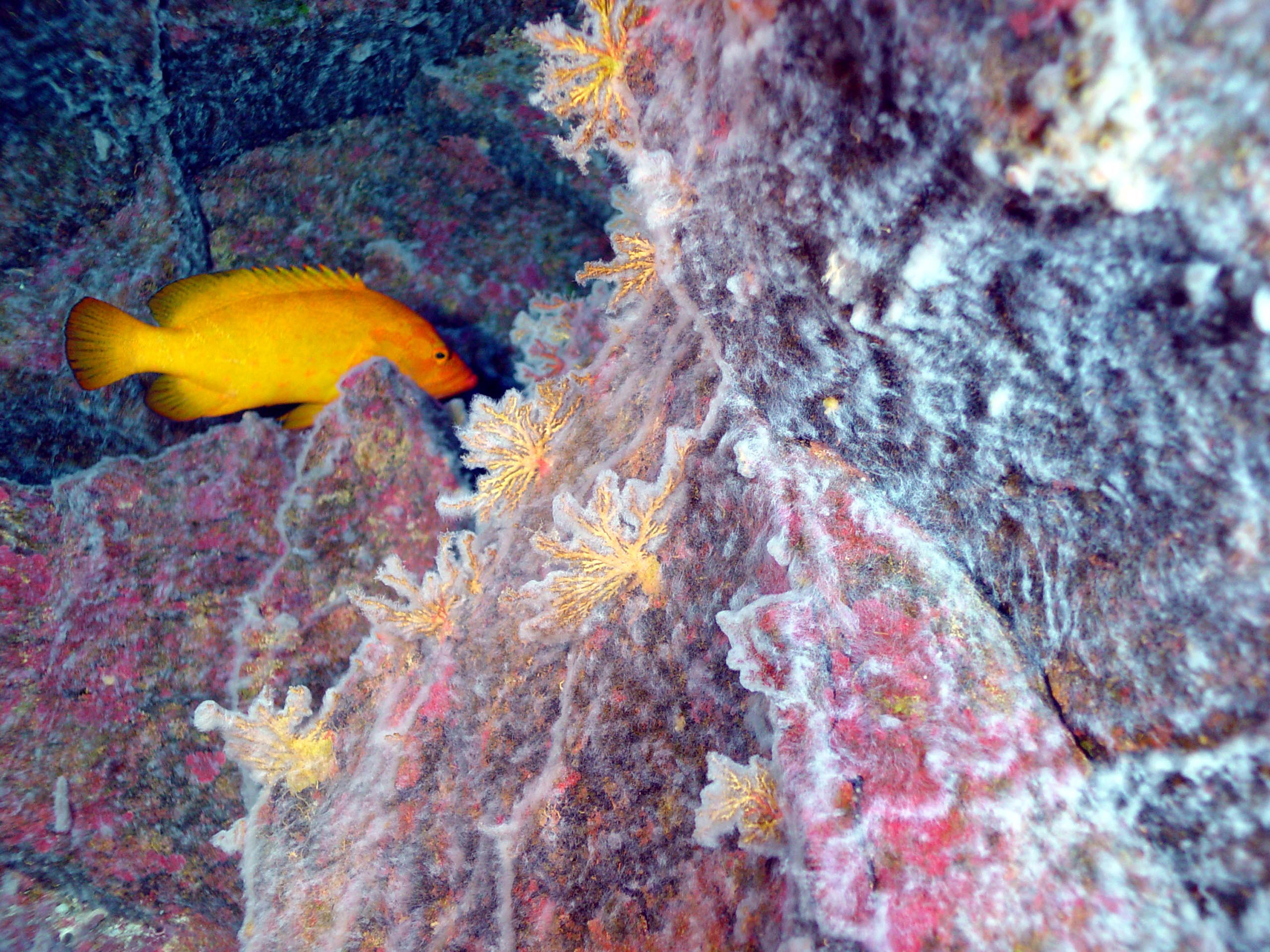
Chemosynthetic microbial mats at the junction between hydrothermal vent and coral reef communities

The hydrothermal vent microbial community includes all unicellular organisms that live and reproduce in a chemically distinct area around hydrothermal vents. These include organisms in the microbial mat, free floating cells, or bacteria in an endosymbiotic relationship with animals. Chemolithoautotrophic bacteria derive nutrients and energy from the geological activity at Hydrothermal vents to fix carbon into organic forms. Viruses are also a part of the hydrothermal vent microbial community and their influence on the microbial ecology in these ecosystems is a burgeoning field of research.

Hydrothermal vents are located where the tectonic plates are moving apart and spreading. This allows water from the ocean to enter into the crust of the earth where it is heated by the magma. The increasing pressure and temperature forces the water back out of these openings, on the way out, the water accumulates dissolved minerals and chemicals from the rocks that it encounters. There are generally three kinds of vents that occur, and are all characterized by temperature and chemical composition: diffuse vents, white smoker vents, and black smoker vents. Due to the absence of sunlight at these ocean depths, energy is provided by chemosynthesis where symbiotic bacteria and archaea form the bottom of the food chain and are able to support a variety of organisms such as Riftia pachyptila and Alvinella pompejana. These organisms use this symbiotic relationship in order to use and obtain the chemical energy that is released at these hydrothermal vent areas.

== Environmental properties ==
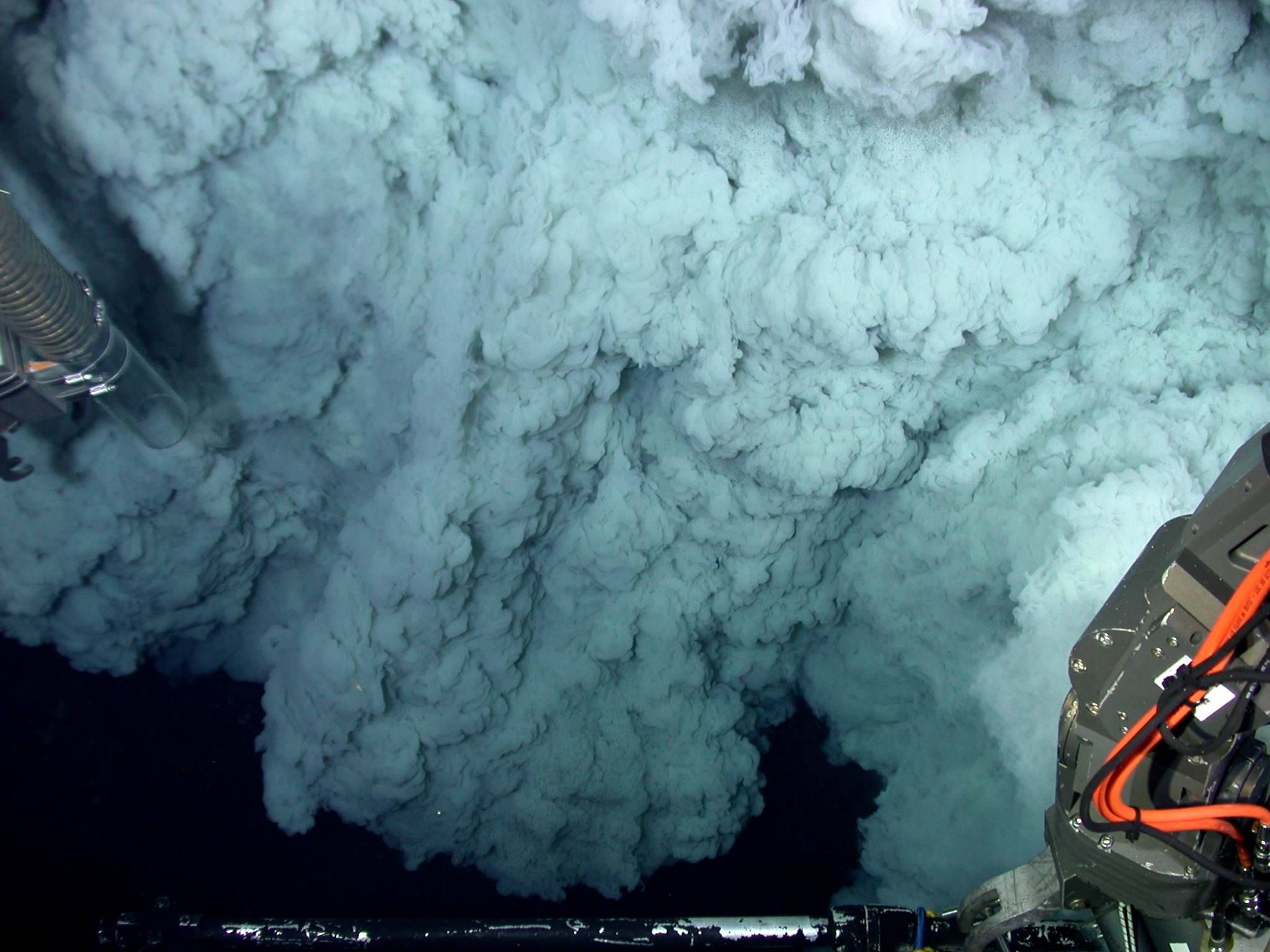
A cloud of effluent being violently expelled by a hydrothermal vent.

Although there is a large variation in temperatures at the surface of the water with seasonal changes, in depths of the thermocline, the temperatures underneath the thermocline and the waters near the deep sea are relatively constant. No changes are caused by seasonal effects or annual changes. These temperatures stay in the range of 0–3 °C with the exception of the waters immediately surrounding the hydrothermal vents, which can get as high as 407 °C. These waters are prevented from boiling due to the high pressure at those depths.

With increasing depth, the high pressure begins to take effect. The pressure increases by about 10 megapascals (MPa) for every kilometre of vertical distance. This means that hydrostatic pressure can reach up to 110 MPa at the depths of the trenches.

Salinity remains relatively constant within the deep seas around the world, at 35 parts per thousand.

Although there is very little light in the hydrothermal vent environment, photosynthetic organisms have been found. However, the energy that the majority of organisms use comes from chemosynthesis. The organisms use the minerals and chemicals that come out of the vents.

=== Types of hydrothermal vents ===
Vent types correlate with geochemical and physical conditions. Characteristics like temperature, mineralogy, and pH. The most common hydrothermal vents are black smokers and white smokers, the general third type being diffuse vents. Alkaline vents occur as well, along with other forms of hydrothermal vents.

==== Black smoker ====
Generally release water hotter than the other vents between 300 and 400 °C. Fluids are high in metal sulfides such as iron, manganese, and copper, and zinc. These minerals precipitate when exposed to cold waters, and deposit on the seabed and form chimney-like structures.

==== White smoker ====
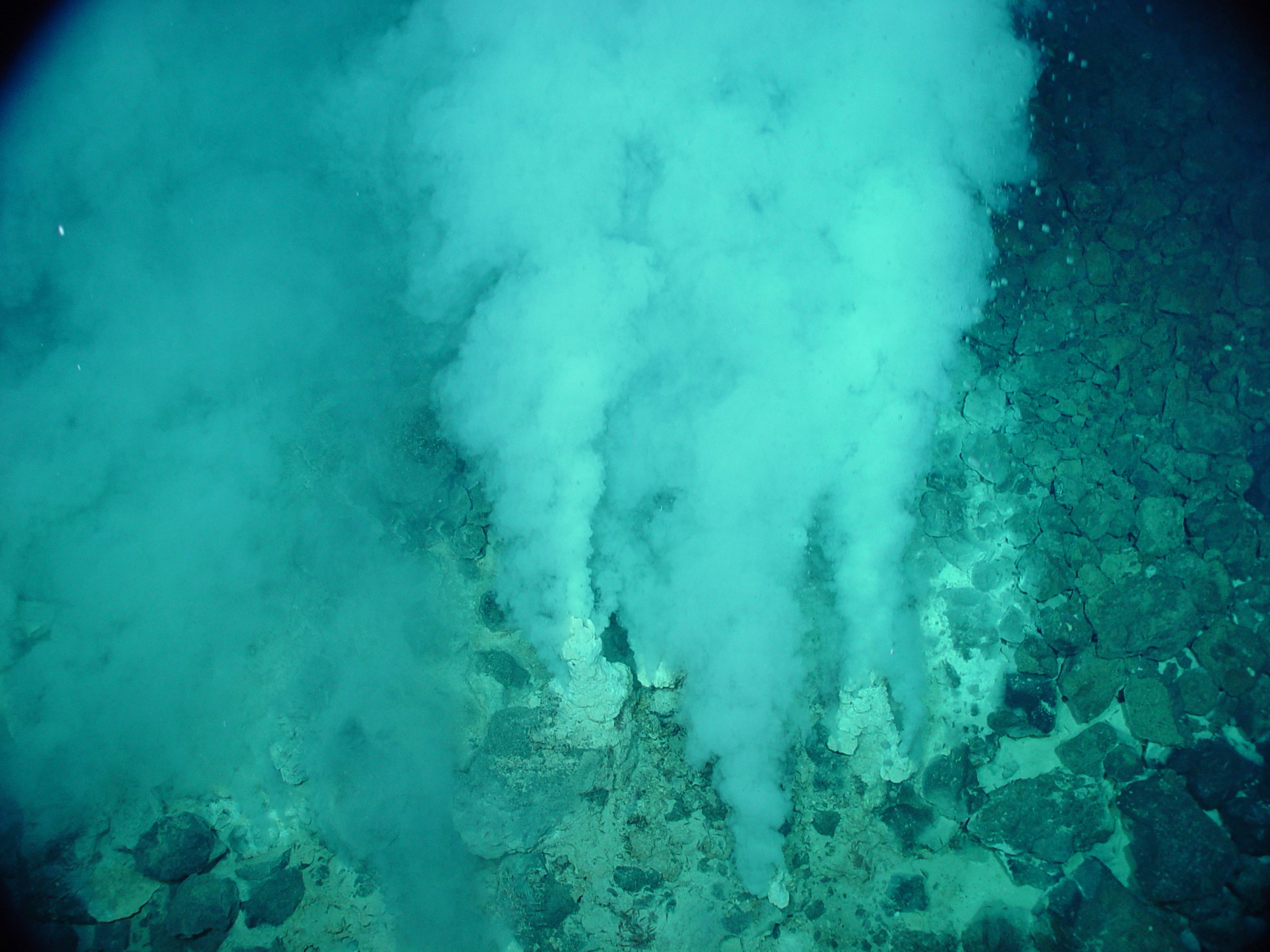
White flocculent mats in and around the extremely gassy, high-temperature (>100°C, 212°F) white smokers at Champagne Vent

Vents emit a milky-coloured water between 200 and 330 °C. The milky-colour originates from calcium-rich minerals in ocean crustal rocks, which easily dissolve in cold seawater, when warmed water surfaces again, white plumes are produced. White smoker vents form chimney-like structures from these precipitates.

==== Diffuse ====
These vents are characterized by clear, low-temperature (< 30 °C) waters. Vent fluids are released and spread out slowly before breaching the sea floor. These vents create temperature and chemical gradients, supporting diverse microbial communities, including sulfur-oxidizing bacteria.

==== Alkaline ====
Characteristics found in alkaline vents are fluids with a high pH, typically ranging from 9 to 11, and low temperatures ranging from 40 to 90 °C. The fluids are rich in methane (CH_{4}) and hydrogen (H_{2}), which were produced from reactions between upper mantle peridotite and cool seawater. This process is known as serpentinization. Environments hosting ultramafic rocks, such as peridotites, are complex and vast.

== Adaptations ==
Extreme conditions in the hydrothermal vent environment mean that microbial communities that inhabit these areas need to adapt to them. Microbes that live here are known to be hyperthermophiles, microorganisms that grow at temperatures above 90 °C. These organisms are found where the fluids from the vents are expelled and mixed with the surrounding water. These hyperthermophilic microbes are thought to contain proteins that have extended stability at higher temperatures due to intramolecular interactions but the exact mechanisms are not clear yet. Along with this, many of the microbes have proteins similar to histones that are bound to the DNA and can offer protection against the high temperatures. Microbes are also found to be in symbiotic relationships with other organisms in the hydrothermal vent environment due to their ability to have a detoxification mechanism which allows them to metabolize the sulfide-rich waters which would otherwise be toxic to the organisms and the microbes.

=== DNA repair ===
Microbial communities inhabiting deep-sea hydrothermal vent chimneys appear to be highly enriched in genes that encode enzymes employed in DNA mismatch repair and homologous recombination. This finding suggests that these microbial communities have evolved extensive DNA repair capabilities to cope with the extreme DNA damaging conditions in which they exist.

== Community Composition ==
=== Bacterial Diversity ===
The most abundant bacteria in hydrothermal vents are chemolithotrophs. These bacteria use reduced chemical species, most often sulfur, as sources of energy to reduce carbon dioxide to organic carbon. The chemolithotrophic abundance in a hydrothermal vent environment is determined by the available energy sources; different temperature vents have different concentrations of nutrients, suggesting large variation between vents. In general, large microbial populations are found in warm vent water plumes (25 °C), the surfaces exposed to warm vent plumes and in symbiotic tissues within certain vent invertebrates in the vicinity of the vent.

==== Sulfur-oxidizing ====
These bacteria use various forms of available sulfur (S^{−2}, S^{0}, S_{2}O_{3}^{−2}) in the presence of oxygen. They are the predominant population in the majority of hydrothermal vents because their source of energy is widely available, and chemosynthesis rates increase in aerobic conditions. The bacteria at hydrothermal vents are similar to the types of sulfur bacteria found in other H_{2}S-rich environments - except Thiomicrospira has replaced Thiobacillus. Other common species are Thiothrix and Beggiatoa, which is of particular importance because of its ability to fix nitrogen.

==== Methane-oxidizing ====
Methane is a substantial source of energy in certain hydrothermal vents, but not others: methane is more abundant in warm vents (25 °C) than hydrogen. Many types of methanotrophic bacteria exist, which require oxygen and fix CH_{4}, CH_{3}NH_{2}, and other C_{1} compounds, including CO_{2} and CO, if present in vent water. These types of bacteria are also found in Riftia trophosome, indicating a symbiotic relationship. Here, methane-oxidizing bacteria refers to methanotrophs, which are not the same as methanogens: Methanococcus and Methanocaldococcus jannaschii are examples methanogens, which are found in hydrothermal vents; whereas Methylocystaceae are methanotrophs, which have been discovered in hydrothermal vent communities as well.

==== Hydrogen-oxidizing ====
Little is known about microbes that use hydrogen as a source of energy, however, studies have shown that they are aerobic, and also symbiotic with Riftia (see below). These bacteria are important in the primary production of organic carbon because the geothermally-produced H_{2} is taken up for this process. Hydrogen-oxidizing and denitrifying bacteria may be abundant in vents where NO_{3}^{−}-containing bottom seawater mixes with hydrothermal fluid. Desulfonauticus submarinus is a hydrogenotroph that reduces sulfur-compounds in warm vents and has been found in tube worms R. pachyptila and Alvinella pompejana.

==== Iron- and manganese-oxidizing ====
These bacteria are commonly found in iron and manganese deposits on surfaces exposed intermittently to plumes of hydrothermal and bottom seawater. However, due to the rapid oxidation of Fe^{2+} in neutral and alkaline waters (i.e. freshwater and seawater), bacteria responsible for the oxidative deposition of iron would be more commonly found in acidic waters. Manganese-oxidizing bacteria would be more abundant in freshwater and seawater compared to iron-oxidizing bacteria due to the higher concentration of available metal.

=== Ecology ===
==== Phyla and genera ====
To illustrate the incredible diversity of hydrothermal vents, the list below is a cumulative representation of bacterial phyla and genera, in alphabetical order. As shown, proteobacteria appears to be the most dominant phyla present in deep-sea vents.

- Actinomycetota
- Aquificota
  - Hydrogenobacter and Aquifex
- Chloroflexota
- Chlorobiota
  - Chlorobium
- Deferribacterota
- Gemmatimonadota
- Nitrospirota
  - Nitrospinota
  - Leptospirillum ferriphilum
- Bacillota
  - Acetogen: Clostridium
- Pseudomonadota
  - Acidithiobacillia
  - Alphaproteobacteria
    - Paracoccus
  - Betaproteobacteria
    - Thiobacillus
    - Sideroxydans lithotrophicus
  - Gammaproteobacteria - major symbionts
    - Allochromatium
    - Thiomicrospira
    - Thioalkalivibrio
    - Methylococcaceae
    - Beggiatoa
    - Thioploca
  - Zetaproteobacteria
    - Mariprofundus ferrooxydans
- Campylobacterota
  - Sulfurovum lithotrophicum
  - Sulfurimonas paralvinellae
  - Nitratifactor salsuginis
  - Hydrogenimonas thermophila
  - Thiovulum
- Desulfobacterota - often sulfate-reducing, make up more than 25% of the bacterial community
  - Desulfovibrio
  - Desulfobulbus
  - Desulfuromonas
  - Dissulfuribacter thermophilus - sulfur disproportionation

==== Symbiotic relationships ====
Symbiotic chemosynthesis is an important process for hydrothermal vent communities. At warm vents, common symbionts for bacteria are deep-sea clams, Calpytogena magnifica, mussels such as Bathyomodiolus thermophilus and pogonophoran tube worms, Riftia pachyptila, and Alvinella pompejana. The trophosome of these animals are specified organs for symbionts that contains valuable molecules for chemosynthesis. These organisms have become so reliant on their symbionts that they have lost all morphological features relating to ingestion and digestion, though the bacteria are provided with H_{2}S and free O_{2}. Additionally, methane-oxidizing bacteria have been isolated from C. magnifica and R. pachyptila, which indicate that methane assimilation may take place within the trophosome of these organisms.

=== Viruses and deep-sea hydrothermal vents ===
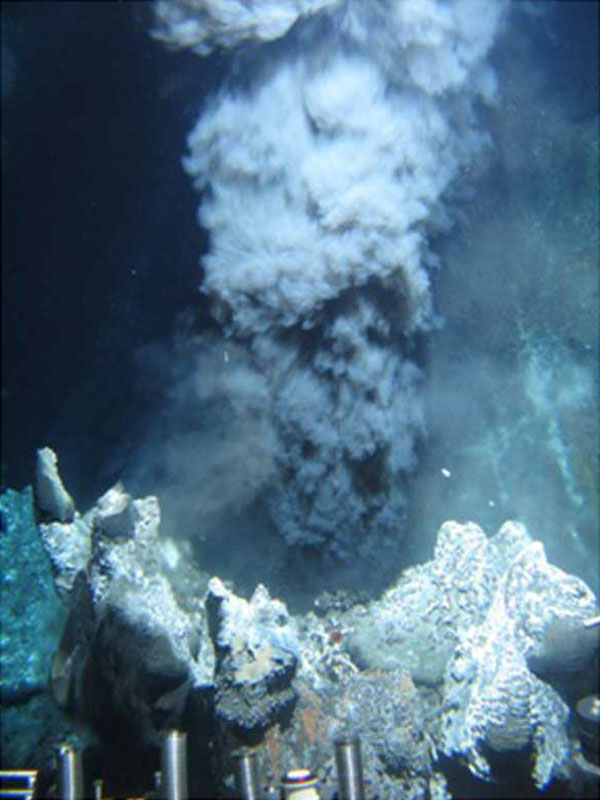
Black smoker in the High Rise portion of the Endeavour Hydrothermal Vents.

Viruses are the most abundant life in the ocean, harboring the greatest reservoir of genetic diversity. As their infections are often fatal, they constitute a significant source of mortality and thus have widespread influence on biological oceanographic processes, evolution and biogeochemical cycling within the ocean. Evidence has been found, however, to indicate that viruses found in vent habitats have adopted a more mutualistic than parasitic evolutionary strategy in order to survive the extreme and volatile environment in which they exist.

Deep-sea hydrothermal vents were found to have large numbers of viruses, indicating high viral production. Samples from the Endeavour Hydrothermal Vents off the southwest coast of British Columbia showed that active venting black smokers had viral abundances from 1.45×10^{5} to 9.90×10^{7} per mL, with a drop-off in abundance found in the hydrothermal-vent plume (3.5×10^{6} per mL) and outside the venting system (2.94×10^{6} per mL). The high density of viruses and therefore of viral production (in comparison to surrounding deep-sea waters) implies that viruses are a significant source of microbial mortality at the vents. As in other marine environments, deep-sea hydrothermal viruses affect the abundance and diversity of prokaryotes and therefore impact microbial biogeochemical cycling by lysing their hosts to replicate.

However, in contrast to their role as a source of mortality and population control, viruses have also been postulated to enhance survival of prokaryotes in extreme environments, acting as reservoirs of genetic information. The interactions of the virosphere with microorganisms under environmental stresses is therefore thought to aide microorganism survival through dispersal of host genes through Horizontal Gene Transfer.

Each second, "there's roughly Avogadro's number of infections going on in the ocean, and every one of those interactions can result in the transfer of genetic information between virus and host." — Curtis Suttle

Temperate phages (those not causing immediate lysis) can sometimes confer phenotypes that improve fitness in prokaryotes ^{[7]} The lysogenic life-cycle can persist stably for thousands of generations of infected bacteria and the viruses can alter the host's phenotype by enabling genes (a process known as lysogenic conversion) which can therefore allow hosts to cope with different environments. Benefits to the host population can also be conferred by expression of phage-encoded fitness-enhancing phenotypes.

Lysogenic Cycle: 1. The prokaryotic cell is shown with its DNA, in green. 2. The bacteriophage attaches and releases its DNA, shown in red, into the prokaryotic cell. 3. The phage DNA then moves through the cell to the host's DNA. 4. The phage DNA integrates itself into the host cell's DNA, creating prophage. 5. The prophage then remains dormant until the host cell divides. 6. After the host cell has duplicated, the phage DNA in the daughter cells activate, and the phage DNA begins to express itself. Some of the cells containing the prophage go on to create new phages which will move on to infect other cells.

A review of viral work at hydrothermal vents published in 2015 stated that vents harbour a significant proportion of lysogenic hosts and that a large proportion of viruses are temperate, indicating that the vent environments may provide an advantage to the prophage.

One study of virus-host interactions in diffuse-flow hydrothermal vent environments found that the high incidence of lysogenic hosts and large populations of temperate viruses was unique in its magnitude and that these viruses are likely critical to the systems' ecology of prokaryotes. The same study's genetic analysis found that 51% of the viral metagenome sequences were unknown (lacking homology to sequenced data), with high diversity across vent environments but lower diversity for specific vent sites, which indicates high specificity for viral targets.

A metagenomic analysis of deep-sea hydrothermal vent viromes showed that viral genes manipulated bacterial metabolism, participating in metabolic pathways as well as forming branched pathways in microbial metabolism which facilitated adaptation to the extreme environment.

An example of this was associated with the sulfur-consuming bacterium SUP05. A study found that 15 of 18 viral genomes sequenced from samples of vent plumes contained genes closely related to an enzyme that the SUP05 chemolithoautotrophs use to extract energy from sulfur compounds. The authors concluded that such phage genes (auxiliary metabolic genes) that are able to enhance the sulfur oxidation metabolism in their hosts could provide selective advantages to viruses (continued infection and replication). The similarity in viral and SUP05 genes for the sulfur metabolism implies an exchange of genes in the past and could implicate the viruses as agents of evolution.

Another metagenomic study found that viral genes had relatively high proportions of metabolism, vitamins and cofactor genes, indicating that viral genomes encode auxiliary metabolic genes. Coupled with the observations of a high proportion of lysogenic viruses, this indicates that viruses are selected to be integrated pro-viruses rather than free floating viruses and that the auxiliary genes can be expressed to benefit both the host and the integrated virus. The viruses enhance fitness by boosting metabolism or offering greater metabolic flexibility to their hosts. The evidence suggests that deep-sea hydrothermal vent viral evolutionary strategies promote prolonged host integration, favoring a form of mutualism rather than classic parasitism.

As hydrothermal vents outlets sub-seafloor material, there is also likely a connection between vent viruses and those in the crust.

== Biogeochemical comparisons ==
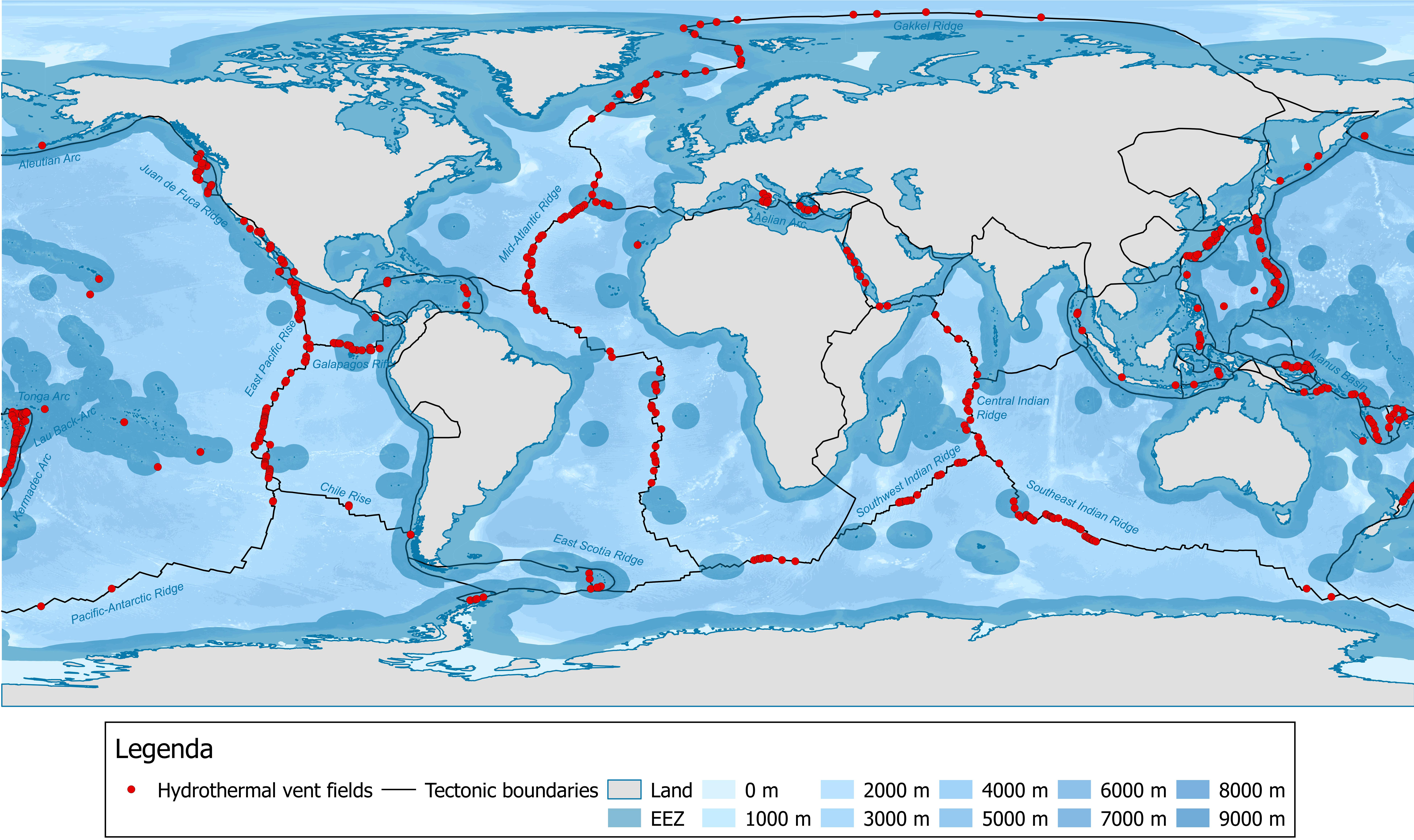
Displays hydrothermal vent fields distribution.

Different geographic regions exhibit variations in the structure and metabolism of microbial communities at hydrothermal vents. This is due to environmental factors such as temperature, plate tectonics, the geochemistry of hydrothermal vent fluid and the availability of nutrients that make them up, as well as vent type, and dispersal barriers.

=== Differences between vent fields ===
Comparative analysis of vent fields have revealed distinct microbial assemblages associated with the varying geochemical conditions along mid-ocean ridges, bark-arc basins, and volcanic arcs. Slow spreading systems like the Mid-Atlantic Ridge (MAR), have significant impacts on fluid chemistry. One study analyzed microbial communities in the sulfide deposits of hydrothermal vents along the MAR; differences arose in vent field sites, even when within geographical proximity of each other. The study highlighted the difference between two rock hosts- basalt and ultramafic. The vent fields hosted by basalt observed in this study often maintained similar key chemistry; high sulfides and metals, and higher abundances of sulfur-oxidizing and sulfur-reducing bacteria. The dominat microbial groups here were found to be Gammaprotecteobacteria and Desulfobacterota. The sites analyzed were the Trans-Atlantic Geotraverse (TAG) and the Snake Pit vent fields.

== Microbial biogeochemistry ==
=== Introduction ===
A diagram showing the process of how seawater becomes a part of the hydrothermal effluent including the elements that are added and precipitated.

Microbial communities at hydrothermal vents mediate the transformation of energy and minerals produced by geological activity into organic material. Organic matter produced by autotrophic bacteria is then used to support the upper trophic levels. The hydrothermal vent fluid and the surrounding ocean water is rich in elements such as iron, manganese and various species of sulfur including sulfide, sulfite, sulfate, elemental sulfur from which they can derive energy or nutrients. Microbes derive energy by oxidizing or reducing elements. Different microbial species use different chemical species of an element in their metabolic processes. For example, some microbe species oxidize sulfide to sulfate and another species will reduce sulfate to elemental sulfur. As a result, a web of chemical pathways mediated by different microbial species transform elements such as carbon, sulfur, nitrogen, and hydrogen, from one species to another. Their activity alters the original chemical composition produced by geological activity of the hydrothermal vent environment.

=== Carbon cycle ===
Geological activity at hydrothermal vents produce an abundance of carbon compounds. Hydrothermal vent plumes contain high concentrations of methane and carbon monoxide with methane concentration reaching 10^{7} times of the surrounding ocean water. Deep ocean water is also a large reservoir of carbon and concentration of carbon dioxide species such as dissolved CO_{2} and HCO_{3}^{−} around 2.2mM. The bountiful carbon and electron acceptors produced by geological activity support an oasis of chemoautotrophic microbial communities that fix inorganic carbon, such as CO_{2,} using energy from sources such as oxidation of sulfur, iron, manganese, hydrogen and methane. These bacteria supply a large portion of organic carbon that support heterotrophic life at hydrothermal vents.

==== Carbon fixation and metabolic pathways ====
Carbon fixation is the incorporation of inorganic carbon into organic matter. Unlike the surface of the planet where light is a major source of energy for carbon fixation, hydrothermal vent chemolithotrophic bacteria rely on chemical oxidation to obtain the energy required. Fixation of CO_{2} is observed in members of Gammaproteobacteria, Campylobacterota, Alphaproteobacteria, and members of Archaea domain at hydrothermal vents. Four major metabolic pathways for carbon fixation found in microbial vent communities include the Calvin–Benson–Bassham (CBB) cycle, reductive tricarboxylic acid (rTCA) cycle, 3-hydroxypropionate (3-HP) cycle and reductive acetyl coenzyme A (acetyl-CoA) pathway.

===== Calvin–Benson–Bassham cycle (CBB) =====
The Calvin-Benson-Bassham (CBB) cycle is the most common CO_{2} fixation pathway found among autotrophs. The key enzyme is ribulose-1,5-bisphosphate carboxylase/oxygenase (RuBisCO). RuBisCO has been identified in members of the microbial community such as Thiomicrospira, Beggiatoa, zetaproteobacterium, and gammaproteobacterial endosymbionts of tubeworms, bivalves, and gastropods.

===== Reductive carboxylic acid cycle (rTCA) =====
The Reductive Carboxylic Acid Cycle (rTCA) is the second most commonly found carbon fixation pathway at hydrothermal vents. rTCA cycle is essentially a reversed TCA or Kreb cycle heterotrophs use to oxidize organic matter. Organism that use the rTCA cycle prefer to inhabit anoxic zones in the hydrothermal vent system because some enzymes in the rTCA cycle are sensitive to the presence of O_{2.} It is found in sulfate reducing deltaproteobacterium such as some members of Desulfobacter, Aquificales and Aquifex and Thermoproteales.

===== 3-HP and 3-HP/4-HB cycles =====
The key enzymes of 3-HP and 3-HP/4-HB cycles are acetyl-CoA/propionyl-CoA carboxylase, malonyl-CoA reductase and propionyl-CoA synthase. Most of the organisms that use this pathway are mixotrophs with the ability to use organic carbon in addition to carbon fixation.

===== Reductive acetyl CoA pathway =====
The Reductive Acetyl CoA pathway has only been found in chemoautotrophs. This pathway does not require ATP as the pathway is directly coupled to the reduction of H_{2}. Organisms that have been found with this pathway prefer H_{2} rich areas. Species include deltaproteobacterium such as Dulfobacterium autotrophicum, acetogens and methanogenic Archaea.

==== Methane metabolism ====
Hydrothermal vents produce high quantities of methane which can originate from both geological and biological processes. Methane concentrations in hydrothermal vent plumes can exceed 300μM in concentration depending on the vent. In comparison, the vent fluid contains 10^{6} – 10^{7} times more methane than the surrounding deep ocean water, of which methane ranges between 0.2-0.3nM in concentration. Microbial communities use the high concentrations of methane as an energy source and a source of carbon. Methanotrophy, where a species uses methane both as an energy and carbon source, have been observed with the presence of gammaproteobacteria in the Methylococcaceae lineages. Methanotrophs convert methane into carbon dioxide and organic carbon. They are typically characterized by the presence of intercellular membranes and microbes with intercellular membranes were observed to make up 20% of the microbial mat at hydrothermal vents.

===== Methane oxidation =====
Energy generation via methane oxidation yields the next best source of energy after sulfur oxidation. It has been suggested that microbial oxidation facilitates rapid turnover at hydrothermal vents, thus much of the methane is oxidize within short distance of the vent. In hydrothermal vent communities, aerobic oxidation of methane is commonly found in endosymbiotic microbes of vent animals. Anaerobic oxidation of methane (AOM) is typically coupled to reduction of sulfate or Fe and Mn as terminal electron acceptors as these are most plentiful at hydrothermal vents. AOM is found to be prevalent in marine sediments at hydrothermal vents and may be responsible for consuming 75% of methane produced by the vent. Species that perform AOM include Archaea of phylum Thermoproteota (formerly Crenarchaeota) and Thermococcus.

===== Methanogenesis =====
Production of methane through methanogenesis can be from degradation of hydrocarbons, from reaction of carbon dioxide or other compounds like formate. Evidence of methanogenesis can be found alongside of AOM in sediments. Thermophilic methanogens are found to grow in Hydrothermal vent plumes at temperatures between 55 °C to 80 °C. However, autotropic methanogenesis performed by many thermophilic species require H_{2} as an electron donor so microbial growth is limited by H_{2} availability. Genera of thermophilic methanogens found at hydrothermal vents include Methanocaldococcus, Methanothermococcus, and Methanococcus.

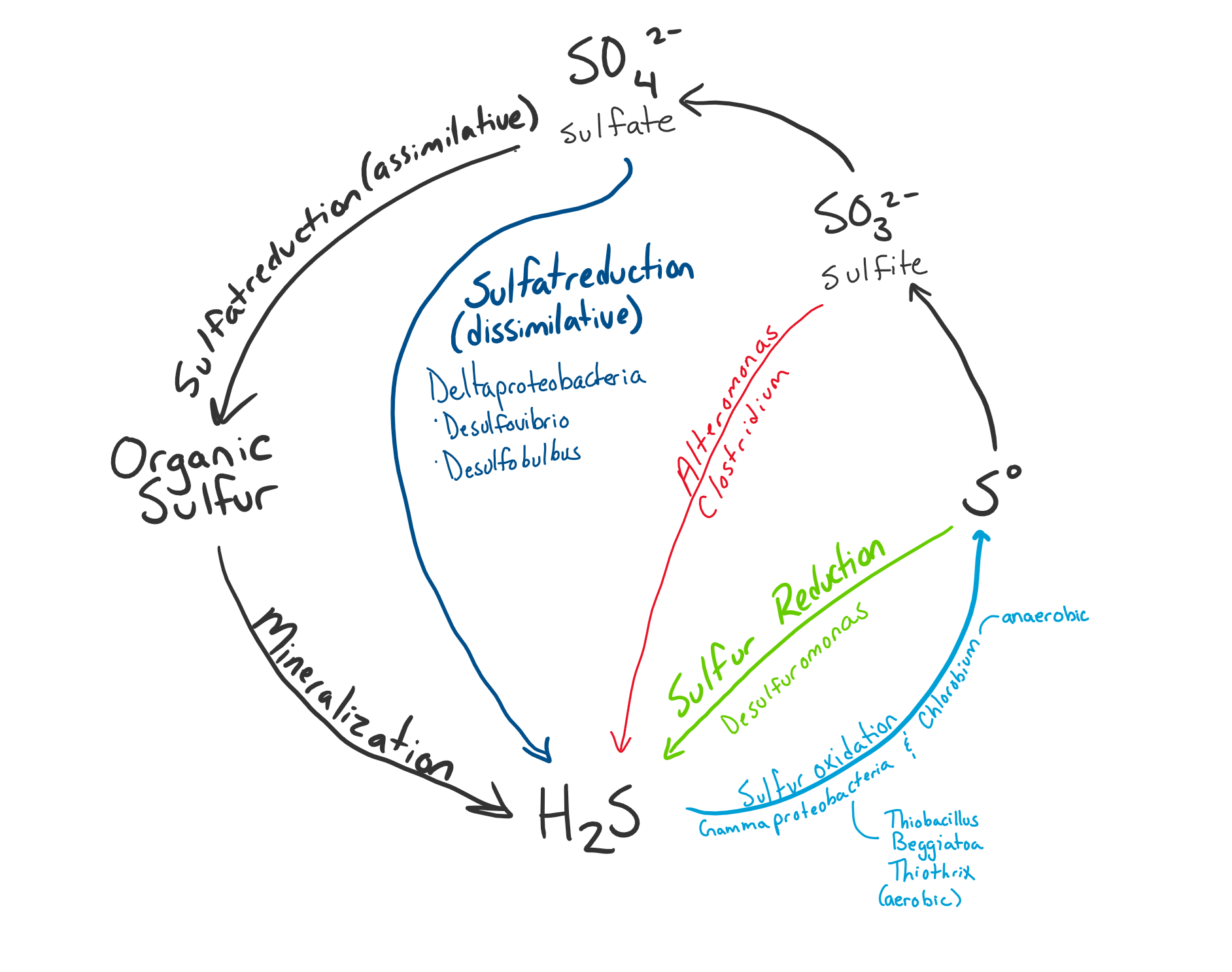
The sulfur cycle processes relevant to hydrothermal vent microbial communities with examples of phyla/genera.

=== Sulfur cycle ===
Microbial communities at hydrothermal vent convert sulfur such as H_{2}S produced by geological activity into other forms such as sulfite, sulfate, and elemental sulfur for energy or assimilation into organic molecules. Sulfide is plentiful at Hydrothermal Vents, with concentrations from one to tens of mM, whereas the surrounding ocean water usually only contains a few nano molars.

==== Sulfur oxidation ====
Reduced sulfur compounds such as H_{2}S produced by the hydrothermal vents are a major source of energy for sulfur metabolism in microbes. Oxidation of reduced sulfur compounds into forms such as sulfite, thiosulfate, and elemental sulfur is used to produce energy for microbe metabolism such as synthesis of organic compounds from inorganic carbon. The major metabolic pathways used for sulfur oxidation includes the SOX pathway and dissimilatory oxidation. The Sox pathway is a multi enzyme pathway capable of oxidizing sulfide, sulfite, elemental sulfur, and thiosulfate to sulfate. Dissimilatory oxidation converts sulfite to elemental sulfur. Sulfur oxidizing species include and the genera of Thiomicrospira, Halothiobacillus, Beggiatoa, Persephonella, and Sulfurimonas. Symbiotic species of the class Gammaproteobacteria and the phlym Campylobacterota can also oxidize sulfur.

==== Sulfur reduction ====
Sulfur reduction uses sulfate as an electron acceptor for the assimilation of sulfur. Microbes that perform sulfate reduction typically use hydrogen, methane or organic matter as an electron donor. Anaerobic oxidation of methane (AOM) often use sulfate as electron acceptor. This method is favoured by organisms living in highly anoxic areas of the hydrothermal vent, thus are one of the predominant processes that occur within the sediments. Species that reduce sulfate have been identified in Archaea and members of Deltaproteobacteria such as Desulfovibrio, Desulfobulbus, Desulfobacteria, and Desulfuromonas at hydrothermal vents.

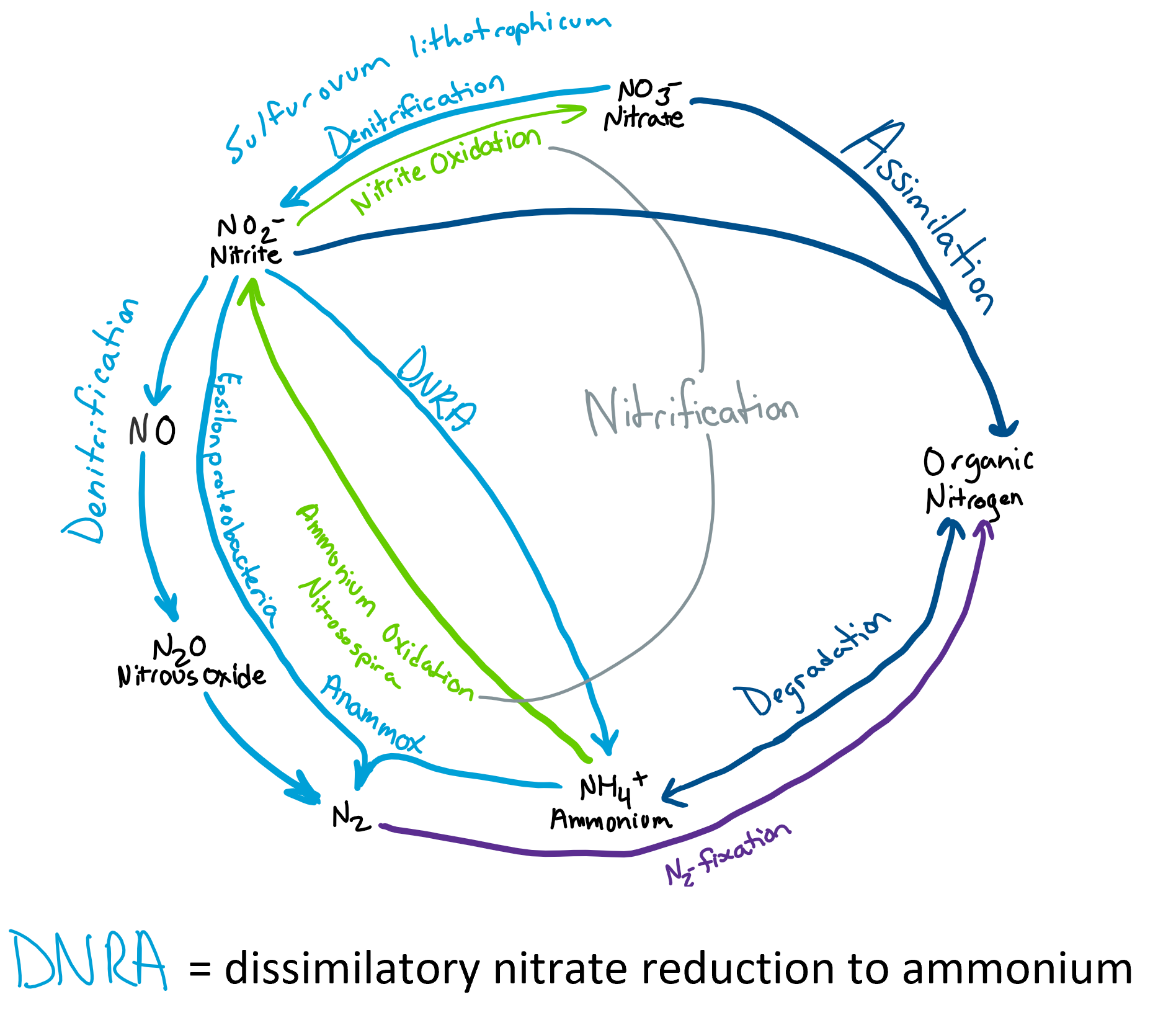
Processes of the nitrogen cycle relevant to microbial communities at hydrothermal vents, including names of pyla/genera. Adapted from Gruber et al. (2008)

=== Nitrogen cycle ===
Deep ocean water contains the largest reservoir of nitrogen available to hydrothermal vents, with around 0.59 mM of dissolved nitrogen gas. Ammonium is the dominant species of dissolved inorganic nitrogen, and can be produced by water mass mixing below hydrothermal vents and discharged in vent fluids. Quantities of available ammonium vary between vents depending on the geological activity and microbial composition. Nitrate and nitrite concentrations are depleted in hydrothermal vents compared to the surrounding seawater.

The study of the Nitrogen cycle in hydrothermal vent microbial communities still requires more comprehensive research. However, isotope data suggests that microorganisms influence dissolved inorganic nitrogen quantities and compositions, and all pathways of the nitrogen cycle are likely to be found at hydrothermal vents. Biological nitrogen fixation is important to provide some of the biologically available nitrogen to the nitrogen cycle, especially at unsedimented hydrothermal vents. Nitrogen is fixed by many different microbes including methanogen in the orders Methanomicrobiales, Methanococcales, and Methanobacteriales. Thermophilic microbes have been found to be able to fix nitrogen at higher temperatures such as 92 °C. Nitrogen fixation may be especially prevalent in microbial mats and particulate material where biologically available levels of nitrogen are low, due to high microbe density and anaerobic environment which allow the function of nitrogenase, a nitrogen-fixing enzyme. Evidence has also been detected of assimilation, nitrification, denitrification, anammox, mineralization and dissimilatory nitrate reduction to ammonium. For example, sulfur oxidizing bacteria like Begiatoa species perform denitrification and reduce nitrate to oxidize H_{2}S. Nitrate assimilation is performed by symbiotic species of Riftia pachyptila tubeworm.

== See also ==
- Marine microorganism
- Movile Cave
- Guaymas Basin
- Hydrogen sulfide chemosynthesis - system of generating energy used in hydrothermal vents
