= Methanocaldococcus sp. FS406-22 =

Scientific classification
- Domain: Archaea
- Kingdom: Methanobacteriati
- Phylum: Methanobacteriota
- Class: Methanococci
- Order: Methanococcales
- Family: Methanocaldococcaceae
- Genus: Methanocaldococcus
- Species: M. sp. FS406-22

Binomial name
- Methanocaldococcus sp. FS406-22

Species of archaeon

Methanocaldococcus sp. FS406-22 is an archaea in the genus Methanocaldococcus. It is an anaerobic, piezophilic, diazotrophic, hyperthermophilic marine archaeon. This strain is notable for fixing nitrogen at the highest known temperature of nitrogen fixers recorded to date. The 16S rRNA gene of Methanocaldococcus sp. FS406-22, is almost 100% similar to that of Methanocaldococcus jannaschii, a non-nitrogen fixer.

== Discovery and isolation ==
Methanocaldococcus sp. FS406-22 was isolated from deep-sea hydrothermal vent fluid. Hydrothermal vents are located on the ocean floor where plates are moving tectonically apart, for example volcano sites and by mid ocean ridges. These mid ocean ridges provide a large supply of food for aquatic marine animals. The particular vent that strain FS406-22 was isolated from, is located on the Juan de Fuca Ridge in the Pacific Ocean near volcanic activity. Mausmi P. Mehta and John A. Baross isolated strain FS406-22 in September 2004 during the New Millennium Observatory cruise. The Thomas G. Thompson vessel made this cruise possible and journeyed off to the Axial Volcano. A remotely operated vehicle (ROPOS) sampled vent fluid from marker 113 using a hydrothermal fluid and particle sampler (HFPS). Marker 113 is a vent located at 1525 meters deep in the southeast corner of the caldera. This vent was active before the last eruption of Axial Volcano in January 1998.

== Characteristics ==
=== Ecology ===
Methanocaldococcus sp. FS406-22 is a deep sea marine Archean. It is a hyperthermophilic methanogen that fixes nitrogen. Strain FS405-22 grows at an optimal temperature of 92 °C, allowing it to thrive near volcanoes. Strain FS406-22 prefers to inhabit specifically hydrothermal vents on the deep sea floor. Lastly, this marine archaean does not sporulate.

=== Morphology ===
This particular strain of Methanocaldococcus is cocci in shape. FS406-22 is gram negative and is not pathogenic to humans. Strain FS406-22 is a free-living marine archaean and motile via flagella.

== Physiology and metabolism ==
Methanocaldococcus sp. FS406-22 is an anaerobic marine archaean that is able to fix nitrogen at extreme depths. Being a hyperthermophilic extremophile, it lives in an extremely hot environment for example, a hydrothermal vent, which can range anywhere from 75 °C to 110 °C. Strain FS406-22 is also a piezophilic, diazotrophic, lithotroph. It has an anaerobic metabolism, nitrogen-fixing metabolism, and is methanogenic. The electron acceptors consist of carbon dioxide, acetic acid, and nitrate. The electron donors are glutamine and carboxylic groups.

== Genome ==
Its genome size is 1.77 Million base pairs long and contains 1,893 protein-coding genes. In addition to these protein coding genes, Methanocaldococcus sp. FS406-22 has 36 pseudogenes and a total of 23 CRISPR loci. This strain has the highest number of CRISPR loci of all sequenced isolates to date. It also has a GC-content of 32.04%.

== Phylogeny ==
The 16S rRNA gene of Methanocaldococcus sp. FS406-22, is almost 100% similar to that of Methanocaldococcus jannaschii DSM 2661. The only difference being that Methanocaldococcus sp. FS406-22 is a hyperthermophilic nitrogen fixing archaea and Methanocaldococcus jannaschii DSM 2661 is unable to fix nitrogen. Other related species and strains of Methanocaldococcus that reside in the same order include: Methanococcus aeolicus, Methanocaldococcus fervens, Methanotorris igneus, Methanocaldococcus infernus, Methanocaldococcus jannaschii, Methanococcus maripaludis, Methanothermococcus okinawensis, Methanococcus vannielii, Methanococcus voltae, and Methanocaldococcus vulcanius.

== Significance ==
Methanocaldococcus sp. FS406-22 is significant due to its ability to fix nitrogen and reduce it from N_{2} to NH_{3} in an optimum temperature of 92 °C. This is an extremely important discovery to the scientific community as this optimum Nitrogen reduction in 92 °C is a total of 28 °C higher than the previously recorded nitrogen reduction of the methanogen, Methanothermococcus thermolithotrophicus. Before the discovery of Methanocaldococcus sp. FS406-22, Methanothermococcus thermolithotrophicus was the most thermophilic microorganism, fixing nitrogen at 64 °C. This particular discovery has potential to reveal a much wider range of conditions for life not only, in the seafloor biosphere but also, other ecosystems that are nitrogen deficient. Looking further into this methanogen, it was found that the 16S rRNA gene of Methanocaldococcus sp. FS406-22, is 99% similar to that of Methanocaldococcus jannaschii DSM 2661. This odd 1% divergence between FS406-22 and M. jannaschii is due to a previous separation of ancestral genes. The revelation of a hyperthermophilic, diazotrophic, archaea (strain FS406-22) may be due to the evolutionary history of nitrogenous. The phylogenetic analysis of nitrogenous and chlorophyll iron proteins suggests that an ancestral iron protein duplicated and diverged into nifH and anfH genes. This divergence of genes is estimated to have happened before the separation of the Domains bacteria and methanogenic archaea. Strain FS406-22 contains a functional nifH gene which is able to encode dinitrogenase reductase whereas M. jannaschii does not possess this gene, explaining the 1% divergence between the two species.
