= Outline of life forms =

Overview of and topical guide to life forms

Life timeline
← / Earth formed; ← / Earliest water; ← / LUCA; ← / Earliest fossils; ← / Great Oxygenation Event; ← / Sexual reproduction; ← / Earliest fungi; ← / Neoproterozoic oxygenation event; ← / Ediacaran biota; ← / Cambrian explosion; ← / Earliest tetrapods; ← / Earliest hominoid
(million years ago)

The following outline is provided as an overview of and topical guide to life forms:

A life form (also spelled life-form or lifeform) is an entity that is living, such as plants (flora), animals (fauna), and fungi (funga). It is estimated that more than 99% of all species that ever existed on Earth, amounting to over five billion species, are extinct.

Earth is the only celestial body known to harbor life forms. No form of extraterrestrial life has yet been discovered.

== Archaea ==
- Archaea – a domain of single-celled microorganisms, morphologically similar to bacteria, but they possess genes and several metabolic pathways that are more closely related to those of eukaryotes, notably the enzymes involved in transcription and translation. Many archaea are extremophiles, which means living in harsh environments, such as hot springs and salt lakes, but they have since been found in a broad range of habitats.
  - Thermoproteota – a phylum of archaea
    - Thermoprotei
      - Sulfolobales – grow in terrestrial volcanic hot springs with optimum growth occurring
  - Euryarchaeota – phylum includes microorganisms
    - Haloarchaea
      - Halobacteriales – found in water saturated or nearly saturated with salt.
    - Methanobacteria
      - Methanobacteriales
    - Methanococci
      - Methanococcales aka Methanocaldococcus jannaschii – thermophilic methanogenic archaea, meaning that it thrives at high temperatures and produces methane
    - Methanomicrobia
      - Methanosarcinales
    - Methanopyri
      - Methanopyrales
    - Thermococci
      - Thermococcales
    - Thermoplasmata
      - Thermoplasmatales – An order of aerobic, thermophilic archaea, in the kingdom
  - Halophiles – organisms that thrive in high salt concentrations
  - Korarchaeota
    - Korarchaeum cryptofilum – These archaea have only been found in high temperature hydrothermal environments, particularly hot springs
  - Lokiarchaeota
  - Methanogens
  - Nanoarchaeota
    - Nanoarchaeum equitans – This organism was discovered in 2002 and lives inside another archaea.
  - Psychrophiles – (sigh-crow-files)
  - Nitrososphaerota – a phylum of the Archaea proposed in 2008 after the genome of Cenarchaeum symbiosum
  - Thermophiles

== Bacteria ==
- Bacteria
  - Gram positive no outer membrane
    - Actinomycetota (high-G+C)
    - Bacillota (low-G+C)
    - Mycoplasmatota (no wall)
  - Gram negative outer membrane present
    - Aquificota
    - Deinococcota
    - Fibrobacterota/Chlorobiota/Bacteroidota (FCB group)
    - Frateuria aurantia (a species of Proteobacteria)
    - Fusobacteriota
    - Gemmatimonadota
    - Nitrospirota
    - Planctomycetota/Verrucomicrobiota/Chlamydiota (PVC group)
    - Pseudomonadota/Myxococcota/Bdellovibrionota/Campylobacterota
    - Spirochaetota
    - Synergistota
  - Unknown / ungrouped
    - Acidobacteriota
    - Chloroflexota
    - Chrysiogenota
    - Cyanobacteria
    - Deferribacterota
    - Dictyoglomota
    - Thermodesulfobacteriota
    - Thermotogota

== Eukaryotes ==
- Eukaryotes – organisms whose cells contain complex structures enclosed within membranes.
  - Unikonta
    - Opisthokonta
      - Animals – multicellular eukaryotic organisms that form the biological kingdom Animalia. With few exceptions, animals consume organic material, breathe oxygen, are able to move, reproduce sexually, and grow from a hollow sphere of cells, the blastula, during embryonic development.
        - Subkingdom Parazoa
          - Porifera
          - Placozoa
        - Subkingdom Eumetazoa
          - Radiata (unranked)
            - Ctenophora
            - Cnidaria
          - Bilateria (unranked)
            - Orthonectida
            - Rhombozoa
            - Acoelomorpha
            - Chaetognatha
            - Superphylum Deuterostomia
              - Chordata
              - Hemichordata
              - Echinodermata
              - Xenoturbellida
              - Vetulicolia †
            - Protostomia (unranked)
              - Superphylum Ecdysozoa
                - Kinorhyncha
                - Loricifera
                - Priapulida
                - Nematoda
                - Nematomorpha
                - Lobopodia
                - Onychophora
                - Tardigrada
                - Arthropoda
              - Superphylum Platyzoa
                - Platyhelminthes
                - Gastrotricha
                - Rotifera
                - Acanthocephala
                - Gnathostomulida
                - Micrognathozoa
                - Cycliophora
              - Superphylum Lophotrochozoa
                - Sipuncula
                - Hyolitha †
                - Nemertea
                - Phoronida
                - Bryozoa
                - Entoprocta
                - Brachiopoda
                - Mollusca
                - Annelida
                - Echiura
      - Mesomycetozoa
      - Fungi – any member of the group of eukaryotic organisms that includes unicellular microorganisms such as yeasts and molds, as well as multicellular fungi that produce familiar fruiting forms known as mushrooms.
        - Blastocladiomycota
          - Chytridiomycota
          - Glomeromycota
          - Microsporidia
          - Neocallimastigomycota
        - Dikarya (inc. Deuteromycota)
          - Ascomycota
            - Pezizomycotina
            - Saccharomycotina
            - Taphrinomycotina
          - Basidiomycota
            - Agaricomycotina
            - Pucciniomycotina
            - Ustilaginomycotina
        - Subphyla incertae sedis
          - Entomophthoromycotina
          - Kickxellomycotina
          - Mucoromycotina
          - Zoopagomycotina
    - Amoebozoa
      - Conosa
        - Mycetozoa (slime-molds)
        - Archamoebae
      - Lobosa
      - Protamoebae
  - Bikonta
    - Apusozoa
    - Excavata
    - Archaeplastida (plants, broadly defined)
      - Glaucophyta – glaucophytes
      - Rhodophyceae – red algae
      - Chloroplastida
      - Chlorophyta – green algae (part)
      - Ulvophyceae
      - Trebouxiophyceae
      - Chlorophyceae
      - Chlorodendrales – green algae (part)
      - Prasinophytae – green algae (part)
      - Mesostigma
      - Charophyta sensu lato – green algae (part) and land plants
        - Streptophytina – stoneworts and land plants
          - Charales – stoneworts
          - Plantae – land plants (embryophytes)
    - SAR supergroup
      - Alveolata
      - Heterokonta
      - Rhizaria

== See also ==
- Outline of biology
- Earliest known life forms
- Extraterrestrial life
- Hypothetical types of biochemistry
- Life
- Marine life
- Organism
