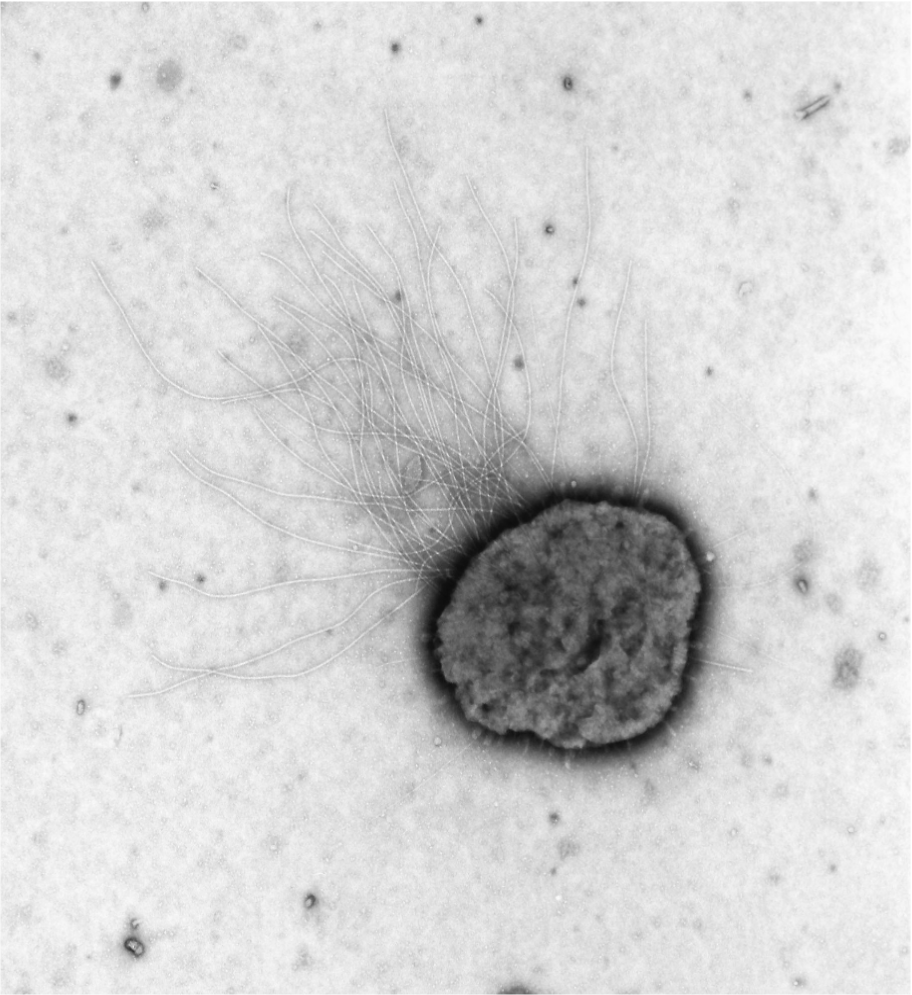
- Electron micrograph showing prominent archaeal features and interior body of the microorganism. Courtesy of Dr. Ken F. Jarrell and Shin-Ichi Aizawa. Mag bar of 500nm.

Scientific classification
- Domain: Archaea
- Kingdom: Methanobacteriati
- Phylum: Methanobacteriota
- Class: Methanococci
- Order: Methanococcales
- Family: Methanococcaceae
- Genus: Methanococcus
- Species: M. maripaludis

Binomial name
- Methanococcus maripaludis Jones et al. 1984

= Methanococcus maripaludis =

Species of archaeon

Methanococcus maripaludis of methanogenic archaeon found in marine environments, predominantly salt marshes and other estuarine sediments. Its type strain, M. maripaludis JJ, was initially discovered and isolated in 1983 from a South Carolina salt marsh. Related strains to M. maripaludis have since been recovered in estuarine sites around the southeastern United States. M. maripaludis is a non-pathogenic, Gram-stain negative, weakly motile, non-spore-forming, and strictly anaerobic mesophile. It is classified as a chemolithoautotroph. This archaeon has a pleomorphic coccoid shape of 0.9-1.3 μm, in diameter. The archaeon has metabolic features that has made it a model for methanogenesis research and archaeal physiology. M. maripaludis has a single circular chromosome consisting of around 1.7 Mbp with over 1,700 identified protein-coding genes. M. maripaludis grows quickly and can double every two hours when placed in ideal conditions, with temperatures between 20 and 45°C, an optimal temperature of roughly 38°C, and a pH between 6.8 and 7.2.

== Cell structure ==
Methanococcus maripaludis has a diameter of 0.9-1.3 μm and is weakly-motile with an irregular-shapped coccus morphology. It possesses a single electron-dense S-layer lacking peptidoglycan. These characteristics assist in identifying its domain as Archaea. Commonly found in methanogens, their cell walls lack murein and possess ether-linked membrane lipids, among other biochemical properties. The S-layer is composed of glycoproteins that enclose the entire cell and help to protect the cell from direct interactions with the environment. More specifically, the S-layer provides archaeal cells a stabilization barrier that is resistant to environmental changes. In the type strain M. maripaludis JJ, the S-layer is glycosylated thus supporting growth of the strain on surfaces like glass and metal which can increase rates of anaerobic iron corrosion. Additionally, M. maripaludis consists of two surface appendages assisting in motility: archaella flagella and pili.

=== Flagella and Pili ===
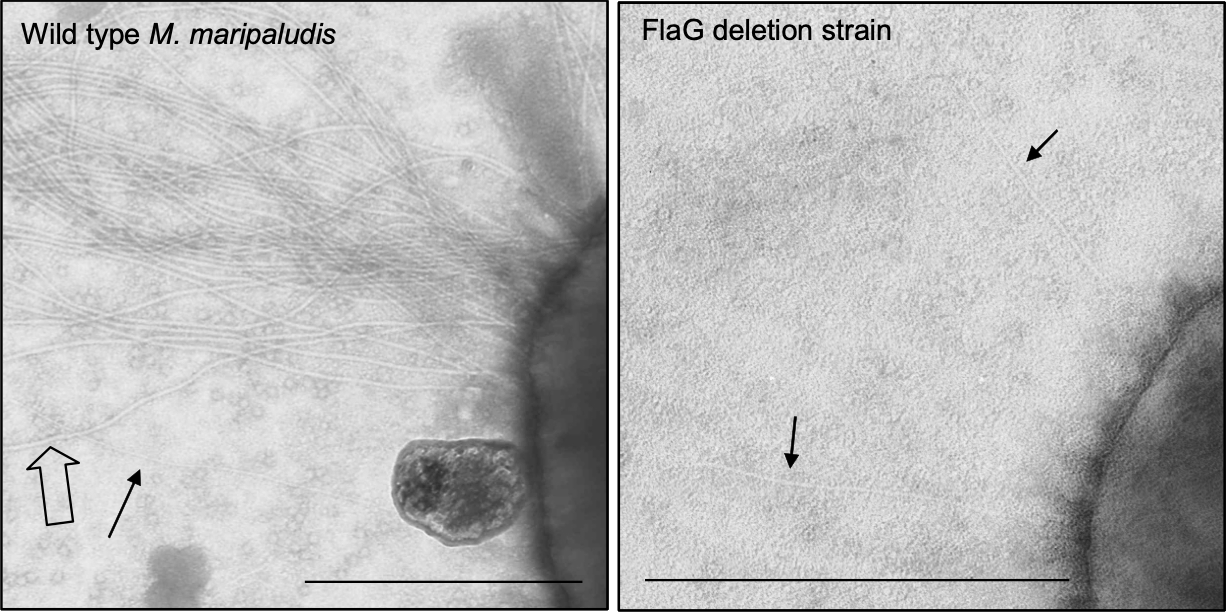
Electron micrograph illustrating both flagellated, Mm900, and non-flagellated cells, ΔFlaG, of Methanococcus maripaludis.

Archaeal flagella are distinctive prokaryotic motility structures that possess homology to bacterial type IV pili (T4P). They are constructed from proteins bearing class III signal peptides that are cleaved by specific signal peptidases. They also possess homologous genes, which encode an ATPase, and conserved membrane proteins for appendage assembly. The flagellum of M. maripaludis is composed of three flagellin glycoproteins, which are all modified with an N-linked tetrasaccharide. This is critical for continued attachment to surfaces, cell-to-cell contact, and locomotion. Both flagella and pili structures are used to attach to surfaces, allowing them the ability to remain in desirable environments.

M. maripaludis possesses a complete set of fla genes with three distinct flagellin genes, flaB1, flaB2 and flaB3, and the remaining eight genes including flaC-flaJ. From the flagella operon, there are two major flagellin proteins required for flagella filaments, flaB1 and flaB2. Flagellin export also requires two specific proteins: flaH and flaI. The hook-like protein in M. maripaludis is likely encoded by the minor flagellin protein, flaB3. The flagella in numerous archaea undergo post-translational modifications, including glycosylation. Consequently, these flagella exhibit larger proteins than their expected gene sequence.

Similar to the flagella, the proteins involved in the pilus assembly of M. maripaludis resemble bacterial Type IV pili due to the presence of an N-terminal signal peptide and an anticipated N-terminal hydrophobic α-helix. The two pilin-like genes, MMP0236 (epdB) and MMP0237 (epdC), possess a short, atypical signal peptide ending in a conserved glycine. This is then succeeded by a hydrophobic segment, resulting in a distinct quaternary structure and pilus formation.

== Metabolism ==
The metabolic landscape of M. maripaludis consists of eight major subsystems which provide pathways for energy generation and cell growth. These subsystems include amino acid metabolism, glycolysis/glycogen metabolism, methanogenesis, nitrogen metabolism, non-oxidative pentose phosphate pathway (NOPPP), nucleotide metabolism, and the reductive citric acid (RTCA) cycle.

Methanogenesis, the process of reducing carbon dioxide to methane, serves as the primary pathway for energy generation in M. maripaludis. The process utilizes coenzymes and a membrane-bound enzyme complex. All eight subsytems of metabolism utlize CO2 as their primary carbon source. Additionally, the subsystems use two essential intermediates, acetyl CoA and pyruvate, to produce precursors critical for cell growth.

=== Methanogenesis ===
Methanogenesis is defined as the biological production of methane via the reduction of carbon substrates such as carbon dioxide and methanol. In M. maripaludis, the primary carbon source for methanogenesis is carbon dioxide, which is reduced by either H_{2} or formate. Though all methanogens use certain key coenzymes, cofactors, and intermediates to produce methane, M. maripaludis undergoes the Wolfe cycle, which converts CO_{2} and hydrogen gas into methane and H_{2}O. As an alternate to H_{2} , use of formate can replace H_{2}. The Wolfe Cycle is the core metabolic pathway used by most hydrogenotrophic methanogenic archaea, explaining its utilization by M. maripaludis and other archea species. Seven different hydrogenases present in M. maripaludis allow for the use of H_{2} as an electron donor to reduce CO_{2.} Recently, various mutant strains of M. maripaludis have shown to be capable of methanogenesis in the absence of hydrogen gas, though this is uncommon.

Methanogenesis in M. maripaludis occurs in the following steps:

1. Reduction of CO_{2} via methanofuran by reduced ferredoxins
2. Oxidation and subsequent reduction of the coenzyme F420 in the presence of H_{2}
3. Transfer of a methyl group from methyl-THMPT to coenzyme M (HS-CoM), driving translocation of 2 Na^{+} across the membrane to strengthen the sodium gradient
4. Reductive demethylation of methyl-S-CoM to form methane and generate additional energy via the subsequent reduction of CoM-S-S-CoB heterodisulfide with H_{2}

The reduction of the heterodisulfide (Step 4) and the transfer of a methyl group from methyl-THMPT to coenzyme M (Step 3) are the major energy generation by M. maripaludis.

=== Amino Acid Synthesis ===
M. maripaludis uses carbon dioxide and acetate as substrates for amino acid biosynthesis. Each of these substrates can produce acetyl-CoA through various mechanisms.Using carbon dioxide, M. maripaludis can generate acetyl-CoA from methyl-THMPT, an intermediate of methanogenesis. This is helped by the reduction of carbon dioxide by a carbon monoxide decarbonylase/acetyl-coA synthase complex(CODH/ACS). Alternatively, using acetate, acetyl-CoA is synthesized by the AMP-forming acetate CoA ligase. acetyl-CoA then acts as a precursor to pyruvate, which promotes methanogenesis and alanine biosynthesis. Pyruvate can be converted to L-alanine via alanine dehydrogenase, which is a reversible reaction.

=== Glycolysis with Formation of Glycogen ===
M. maripaludis has a modified Embden Meyerhof-Parnas (EMP) pathway, a variation of the glycolysis pathway. Dissimilarly to other organisms that reduce NAD to NADH in the EMP Pathway, M. maripaludis reduces ferrodoxins. Additionally, the kinases, responsible for transferring phosphate groups between compounds, uniquely rely on ADP rather than ATP, resulting in a lower net consumption of ATP. However, M. maripaludis is capable of synthesizing glycogen. Due to experimentally observed activities of enzymes involved in both the catabolic and anabolic directions of the EMP Pathway, anabolism is utilized to a higher extent, resulting in the formation of the sugars needed for nucleoside biosynthesis as well as glycogen.

=== Nitrogen Assimilation and Fixation ===
M. maripaludis uses three sources of nitrogen: ammonia, alanine, and dinitrogen. Ammonia is the preferred source of nitrogen. Nitrogen assimilation occurs in the bacteria through ammonia when an inorganic nitrogen compound is converted to an organic nitrogen compound. In M. maripaludis, glutamine synthetase is used to complete ammonia assimilation by making glutamine from glutamate and ammonia via the gIna enzyme. Glutamine transfers nitrogen to amino acids and other cellular components.

M. maripaludis uses alanine racemase and alanine permease for alanine uptake. A racemase enzyme is used to convert the stereochemistry within the molecule. Permease is a protein that catalyzes the transport of a molecule across the membrane. Analine dehydrogenase will make pyruvate and ammonia from analine.

Free N_{2} fixation is well established in M. maripaludis. M. maripaludis contains a multiprotein nitrogen complex containing an Fe protein and a MoFe. The ferredoxin is reduced and reduces the oxidized Fe, stripping the Fe of its electrons in the presence of N_{2}. The now reduced Fe protein is oxidized by ATP, reducing the MoFe protein. The MoFe protein then reduces N_{2} to ammonia. This reductive step uses the electrons from the reduced ferredoxin which requires high amounts of energy. N_{2} fixation is unfavorable in M. maripaludis because of the high energy demand, so it is common for a cell to not activate this fixation pathway when ammonia and alanine are available.

=== Pentose Phosphate Pathway ===
The pentose phosphate pathway (PPP) is essential for M. maripaludis to make nucleotides and nucleic acids. In the PPP, M. maripaludis uses glyceraldehyde-3-phosphate and fructose-6-phosphate to make xylulose-5-phosphate and erythrose-4-phosphate.Since M. maripaludis is anaerobic, it contains non-oxidative enzymes, but surprisingly lacks the non-oxidative enzyme activities. Non-oxidative means that the enzymes do not combine with oxygen and oxidize. The non-oxidative pentose phosphate pathway (NOPPP) is regulated and used through substrate availability. Four enzymes are used in this conversion: transketoloase, ribulose-phosphate 3-epimerase, ribose-5-phosphate isomerase, and translaldolase.

=== Nucleic Acid Biosynthesis ===
The non-oxidative pentose phosphate pathway makes ribose-5-phosphate which is converted into phosphoribosyl pyrophosphate (PRPP). For nucleic acid biosynthesis, M.maripaludis will produce pyrimidines, such as uridine triphosphate (UTP) and cytidine triphosphate (CTP), as well as purines,s such as guanine triphosphate (GTP) and adenosine triphosphate (ATP). To synthesize the pyrimidines, PRPP combines orotate to synthesize uridine monophosphate (UMP), and then be phosphorylated into uridine triphosphate (UTP). UMP also functions as a precursor to CTP. To synthesize the purines, inosinic acid (IMP) is first made via a series of reactions, which include PRPP catalyzing the synthesis of 5-phosphoribosylamine. IMP will be converted into adenosine monophosphate (AMP) and guanine monophosphate (GMP). AMP is synthesized by IMP and GMP is synthesized by the conversion of IMP to xanthine monophosphate (XMP). These nucleotides are used for the growth of M. maripaludis.

=== Reductive Citric Acid (rTCA) Cycle ===
M. maripaludis, a strictly anaerobic mesophile, processes an incomplete Reductive Citric Acid (RTA) Cycle to reduce CO_{2} and H_{2}O and synthesize complex carbon molecules. Lacking several steps and essential enzymes, including phosphoenolpyruvate carboxykinase, citrate synthase, aconitate, and isocitrate dehydrogenase, hinders the completion of this cycle. Pyruvate is the initial metabolite in M. maripaludis for the Tricarboxylic Acid Cycle. Since M. maripaludis lacks phosphoenolpyruvate carboxylase, oxaloacetate will be made by pyruvate.

== Genetics ==
Methanococcus maripaludis is one of four hydrogenotrophic methanogens, along with Methanocaldococcus jannaschii, Methanothermobacter thermautotrophicus, and Methanopyrus kandleri, to have its genome sequenced, prior to the advent of next-generation sequencing. Of these three, Methanocaldococcus jannaschii is the closest living, known relative of M. maripaludis. M. maripaludis has one single circular chromosome and shares genomic similartities with other hydrogenotrphic methanogens based on Basic Local Alignment Search Tool (BLAST) protein sequence comparisons.

Twenty one different strains of M. maripaludis have had their genomes sequenced, revealing distinctive features. Individual cells contain multiple chromosome copies that range from 5 to 55 per cell. Of its 1,722 protein coding genes, 835 ORFs, or open reading frames, have unknown functions, and 129 ORFs are unique to M. maripaludis. Some of these genes have been identified using in vivo transposon mutagenesis that may be essential for growth, making up approximately 30% of the genome. The sequenced genome encodes about 48 protein transport systems, largely dominated by ABC transporters.

The genome and genetic tractability of M. maripaludis have made it an important organism for archaeal genetics and biotechnology. Researchers have successfully genetically altered strains to produce non-native, desired products, such as geraniol and polyhydroxybutyrate. Additionally, CRISPR/Cas9 technology has been adapted for M. maripaludis. to characterize a variety of promoters and ribosome-binding sites,s as well as to enable large-scale genome editing.

M. maripaludis has been identified as having a phosphate-responsive promoter system that increases gene expression in conditions where phosphate availability is limited. This regulatory system allows for controlled recombinant protein production without chemical inducers, further highlighting the microbe's importance in genetic engineering and biotechnology.

== Environmental Roles ==
Methanogens play important roles in waste water treatment, carbon conversion, hydrogen production, and many other environmental processes. In waste water treatment, they anaerobically degrade organic waste into methane through a symbiotic relationship with syntrophic bacteria. M. maripaludis, like many methanogens, can utilize CO_{2} emissions and hydrogen to produce methane, making it a promising organism for converting greenhouse gas emissions into renewable fuel. The ability of M. maripaludis to uptake CO_{2} from environmental and industrial sources, including power and chemical plants, provides potential applications in carbon capture and biomethane production. Hydrogen gas is diffused into the surrounding environment as a byproduct of formate driven methanogenesis. However, large hydrogen requirements remain a major limitation to the widespread use of methanogens for biomethane generation. By converting captured CO_{2} into methane, M. maripaludis offers a route for producing fuel while recycling carbon emissions, although the process's environmental benefits depend on the hydrogen source and the control of methane emissions.
