= Autogenerative high-pressure digestion =

Biogas production method

Autogenerative high-pressure fermentation (AHPD) is a biogas production technique that operates under elevated gas pressure. This pressure is naturally generated by the bacteria and archaea through the gases they release. First described by R. Lindeboom of University of Wageningen (WUR) in 2011, a batch reactor was pressurized to 58 bar, yielding a methane concentration of 96% in the resulting biogas. This method is also commonly referred to as High Pressure Anaerobic Digestion (HPAD) in scientific literature.

AHPD leverages the higher solubility of carbon dioxide (CO_{2}) at 0.031 mol/L/bar compared to methane (CH_{4}) at 0.0016 mol/L/bar. This difference allows more CO_{2} to dissolve in the digestate, while hydrogen sulfide (H_{2}S) also dissolves more efficiently under pressure. The result is biogas with a higher methane content, which requires less upgrading to meet natural gas standards, ultimately reducing processing costs.

== Microbial composition ==
Individual species of microorganism have different optimal conditions in which they grow and replicate most rapidly.There is a specificrange around that optimum in which a specie is able to survive. Factors such as the pH, temperature, osmotic pressure (often caused by salinity) all contribute to the optimal condition of all microorganisms. For example, in terms of pressure, some species are able to survive in extremophile conditions such as extreme radiation, temperature, salinity or pressure. Piezophile microorganisms have their optimal growth condition at a pressure equal to or above 10 megapascals (99 atm; 1,500 psi). Some bacteria and archaea have adapted to life in the deep oceans, where the pressure (Hydrostatic pressure) is much higher than at sea level. For example, the methane-producing archaea species Methanocaldococcus, Methanothermococcus, Methanopyrus and Methanotorris have been found in hydrothermal vents in the ocean floor. Research at the University of Groningen (RUG) has shown that the bacterial community is affected by pressure from composition changes. This makes it possible to influence the anaerobic digestion process.

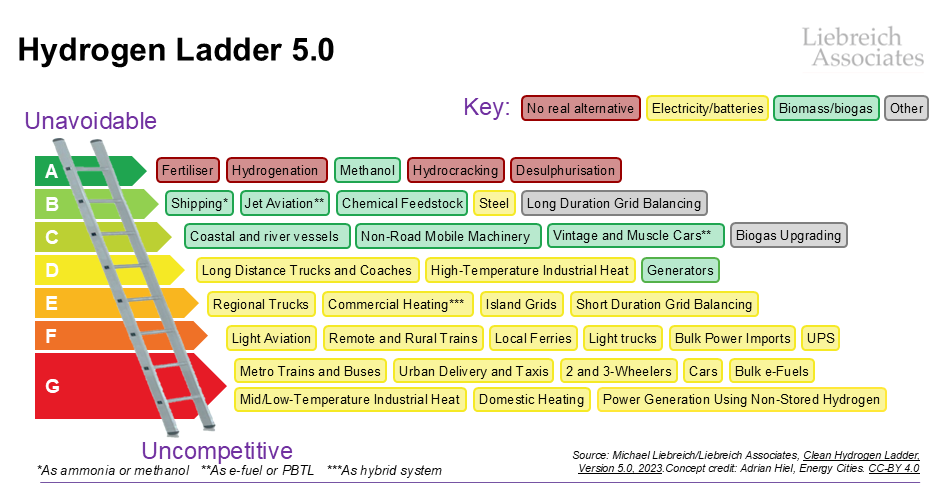
Hydrogen Ladder: Ranking of hydrogen applications and uses in the medium term.

A further development of this technique is the addition of hydrogen gas to the reactor. According to Henry's law, this gas also dissolves more at increased pressure. The result is that it can be better absorbed by bacteria and archea. In turn, it converts the hydrogen gas with the already dissolved carbon dioxide into additional methane. This combination of techniques was described in detail by Kim et all in 2021, known to be a process called biological methanation. On Michael Liebreich's hydrogen ladder 5.0, this form of biogas upgrading is at step C. This is considerably higher than applications as fuel in vehicles. These are spread over steps D to G.

Although the technique is usually used as a fermentation process for thick liquid flows and solid biomass, it can also be applied as anaerobic Wastewater treatment. In South Korea, they have succeeded in operating a UASB reactor (a form of anaerobic wastewater treatment) at 8 Bar. A biogas was then created with a methane content of 96.7%. A remarkable finding was that the grains in the sludge that are so similar in characteristic of the UASB technique were well preserved. This was because more Extracellular polymeric substance (EPS) was formed in the biofilm. Microorganisms make these to protect themselves against difficult conditions, in this case the extreme pressure.

== See also ==
- Biogas
- Anaerobic digestion
