= Methanothermococcus okinawensis =

Scientific classification
- Domain: Archaea
- Kingdom: Methanobacteriati
- Phylum: Methanobacteriota
- Class: Methanococci
- Order: Methanococcales
- Family: Methanococcaceae
- Genus: Methanothermococcus
- Species: M. okinawensis

Binomial name
- Methanothermococcus okinawensis Takai et al. 2002

Species of archaeon

Methanothermococcus okinawensis is a thermophilic, methane-producing archaeon first isolated from deep-sea hydrothermal vent on the western Pacific Ocean. Its cells are highly motile, irregular cocci, with a polar bundle of flagella. Its type strain is IH1^{T} (=JCM 11175^{T} =DSM 14208^{T}). It grows at an optimal temperature of 60–65 °C and pH of 6.7. It is strictly anaerobic and reduces carbon dioxide with hydrogen to produce methane, but it can also use formate. Research studies indicate that it might be able to survive extreme conditions in solar system's other bodies, such as Saturn's moon Enceladus.

== See also ==
- Methanogens
