= Methanococcus =

Scientific classification
- Domain: Archaea
- Kingdom: Methanobacteriati
- Phylum: Methanobacteriota
- Class: Methanococci
- Order: Methanococcales
- Family: Methanococcaceae
- Genus: Methanococcus; Kluyver and van Niel 1936

Type species
- Methanococcus vannielii Stadtman & Barker 1951

Species
- M. aeolicus; M. mangrovi; M. maripaludis; "M. thermophila"; M. vannielii; M. voltae

Genus of archaea

Methanococcus is a genus of coccoid methanogens of the family Methanococcaceae. They are all mesophiles, except the thermophilic M. thermolithotrophicus and the hyperthermophilic M. jannaschii. The latter was discovered at the base of a "white smoker" chimney at 21°N on the East Pacific Rise and it was the first archaeal genome to be completely sequenced, revealing many novel and eukaryote-like elements.

== Phylogeny ==
The currently accepted taxonomy is based on the List of Prokaryotic names with Standing in Nomenclature (LPSN) and National Center for Biotechnology Information (NCBI).

16S rRNA based LTP_07_2026

- - Methanofervidicoccus
  - - Methanothermococcus~1
    - - Methanococcus aeolicus Kendall et al. 2006
      - - Methanothermococcus
        - - Methanococcus
            - M. maripaludis Jones et al. 1984
            - - M. vannielii Stadtman and Barker 1951 (type sp.)
              - M. voltae Balch et al. 1981 emend. Ward et al. 1989

53 marker proteins based GTDB 11-RS232

- - - Methanofervidicoccus
      - M. abyssi
      - - Methanothermococcus okinawensis
        - Methanococcus aeolicus
  - - Methanothermococcus
    - - Methanococcus
        - M. voltae
        - - M. maripaludis
          - M. vannielii

== See also ==
- List of Archaea genera
