= Methanotorris =

Scientific classification
- Domain: Archaea
- Kingdom: Methanobacteriati
- Phylum: Methanobacteriota
- Class: Methanococci
- Order: Methanococcales
- Family: Methanocaldococcaceae
- Genus: Methanotorris; Whitman 2002

Type species
- Methanotorris igneus (Burggraf et al. 1990) Whitman 2002

Species
- M. formicicus; M. igneus

Genus of archaea

Methanotorris is a genus of archaeans in the family Methanocaldococcaceae. and National Center for Biotechnology Information (NCBI). The organisms in this genus differ from those of Methanothermococcus in that they are hyperthermophiles and from those of Methanocaldococcus in that they have no flagella, are not motile, and do not require selenium to grow. These microbes have not been shown to cause any illnesses.

== Nomenclature ==
The name "Methanotorris" comes from the Latin methanum for methane and torris for fire. Overall, it means "organism that produces methane at high temperatures."

== See also ==
- List of Archaea genera
