= Isopentenyl phosphate kinase =

Class of enzyme

Identifiers
- EC no.: 2.7.4.26

Databases
- IntEnz: IntEnz view
- BRENDA: BRENDA entry
- ExPASy: NiceZyme view
- KEGG: KEGG entry
- MetaCyc: metabolic pathway
- PRIAM: profile
- PDB structures: RCSB PDB PDBe PDBsum
Search
- PMC: articles
- PubMed: articles
- NCBI: proteins

Isopentenyl phosphate kinase (EC 2.7.4.26) is an enzyme with systematic name ATP:isopentenyl phosphate phosphotransferase. It catalyses the following chemical reaction

isopentenyl phosphate
ATP
ADP
ATP
ADP
isopentenyl pyrophosphate

The enzyme first characterised from peppermint and Escherichia coli converts isopentenyl phosphate to isopentenyl pyrophosphate by transferring a phosphate group from the cofactor, adenosine triphosphate (ATP), which is converted to adenosine diphosphate (ADP).

This enzyme takes part in a modified mevalonate pathway in Archaea such as Methanocaldococcus jannaschii. Its structure has been determined by X-ray crystallography.
