= Biological methanation =

Production of methane by microorganisms

Biological methanation (also: biological hydrogen methanation (BHM) or microbiological methanation) is a conversion process to generate methane by means of highly specialized microorganisms (Archaea) within a technical system. This process can be applied in a power-to-gas system to produce biomethane and is appreciated as an important storage technology for variable renewable energy in the context of energy transition. This technology was successfully implemented at a first power-to-gas plant of that kind in the year 2015.

== Disambiguation ==
Biological methanation contains the principle of the so-called methanogenesis, a specific, anaerobic metabolic pathway where hydrogen and carbon dioxide are converted into methane. By analogy with the biological process, a chemical-catalytic process, also known as Sabatier reaction, exists.

== Principle of function ==
Numerous and common microorganisms within the domain Archaea convert the compounds hydrogen (H_{2}) and carbon dioxide (CO_{2}) into methane in a bio-catalytic way. The therefore relevant metabolic processes run under strictly anaerobic conditions and in an aqueous environment.

4 H_{2} + CO_{2} → CH_{4} + 2 H_{2}O $\qquad \Delta G^{\circ} = -136{.}0 \, \frac{\mathrm{kJ}}{\mathrm{mol \, CH_4}}$

Suitable Archaea for this process are so called Methanogens with a hydrogenotrophical metabolism. They are primary to be allocated among the order of Methanopyrales, Methanobacteriales, Methanococcales and Methanomicrobiales. These Methanogens are naturally adapted for different anaerobic environments and conditions. Basically, the Methanogens need aqueous, anoxic conditions with min. 50% water and a redox potential of less than −330 mV. The Methanogens prefer lightly acidic to alkali living conditions and are found in a very wide temperature range from 4 to 110 °C.

== Reactor types ==
The most common utilized reactor type for biological methanation is the stirred-tank reactor in which the mass transfer is influenced by several factors such as geometry of the reactor, impeller configuration, the agitation speed and the gas flow rate. Additionally, less investigated reactor types like Trickle-bed reactors, bubble-column reactors and gas-lift reactors have specific drawbacks and advantages regarding the abovementioned limitations.

== Potential applications of biological methanation ==
Biological methanation can take place as an in-situ process within a fermenter (see fig. 3.1) or as an ex-situ process in a separate reactor (see fig. 3.2 to 3.4).

Biological methanation in a biogas or clarification plant with a gas processing system (in-situ process) Hydrogen is added directly to the fermentation material during a fermentation process and the biological methanation takes place subsequently in the thoroughly gassed fermentation material. The gas is, depending on its pureness, cleaned up to methane before the infeed into the gas grid.

Biological methanation takes place in a separate methanation plant. The gas is completely converted into methane before the infeed into the gas grid. The carbon dioxide, produced in a gas processing system, is converted into methane in a separate methanation plant, by adding hydrogen and can then be fed into the gas grid.

Biological methanation in combination with an arbitrary carbon dioxide source (ex-situ process) In a separate methanation plant the hydrogen is converted into methane together with carbon dioxide and then fed into the gas grid (stand-alone solution).

Biological methanation in a pressurized reactor vessel (in-situ process). Pressure allows for better hydrogen solubility and therefore easier conversion into methane by microorganisms. A possible reactor configuration can be Autogenerative high-pressure digestion. Research in Korea has demonstrated that 90% > CH_{4}, 180 MJ/m^{3} biogas can be produced in this way.

== Implementation in the field ==
Since March 2015 the first power-to-gas plant globally is feeding synthetic bio methane, generated by means of biological methanation, into the public gas grid in Allendorf (Eder), Germany. The plant runs with an output rate of 15 Nm3/h, which corresponds to 400,000 kWh per year. With this amount of gas a distance of 750,000 kilometers per year with a CNG-vehicle can be achieved.
