= Hydrogen sulfide chemosynthesis =

Biological process

A diagram of hydrothermal vent (hydrogen sulfide) chemosynthesis

Hydrogen sulfide chemosynthesis is a form of chemosynthesis which uses hydrogen sulfide. It is common in hydrothermal vent microbial communities. Due to the lack of light in these environments, this is predominant over photosynthesis.

Giant tube worms use bacteria in their trophosome to fix carbon dioxide (using hydrogen sulfide as their energy source) and produce sugars and amino acids. Some reactions produce sulfur:

hydrogen sulfide chemosynthesis:

18H_{2}S + 6CO_{2} + 3O_{2} → C_{6}H_{12}O_{6} (carbohydrate) + 12H_{2}O + 18S

In the above process, hydrogen sulfide serves as a source of electrons for the reaction. Instead of releasing oxygen gas as in photosynthesis, hydrogen sulfide chemosynthesis produces solid globules of sulfur in the process.

== Mechanism of action ==
In deep sea environments, different organisms have been observed to have the ability to oxidize reduced compounds such as hydrogen sulfide. Oxidation is the loss of electrons in a chemical reaction. Most chemosynthetic bacteria form symbiotic associations with other small eukaryotes. The electrons that are released from hydrogen sulfide will provide the energy to sustain a proton gradient across the bacterial cytoplasmic membrane. This movement of protons will eventually result in the production of adenosine triphosphate. The amount of energy derived from the process is also dependent on the type of final electron acceptor.

== Other examples of chemosynthetic organisms ==
=== Using H_{2}S as electron donor ===
Across the world, researchers have observed different organisms in various locations capable of carrying out the process. Yang and colleagues in 2011 surveyed five Yellowstone thermal springs of varying depths and observed that the distribution of chemosynthetic microbes coincided with temperature as Sulfurihydrogenibiom was found at higher temperatures while Thiovirga inhabited cooler waters. Miyazaki et al. in 2020 also found an endosymbiont capable of hydrogen sulfide chemosynthesis which contained campylobacter species and a gastropod from the genus Alviniconcha oxidise hydrogen sulfide in the Indian Ocean. Furthermore, chemosynthetic bacteria such as purple sulfur bacteria have yellow globules of sulfur visible in their cytoplasm.
