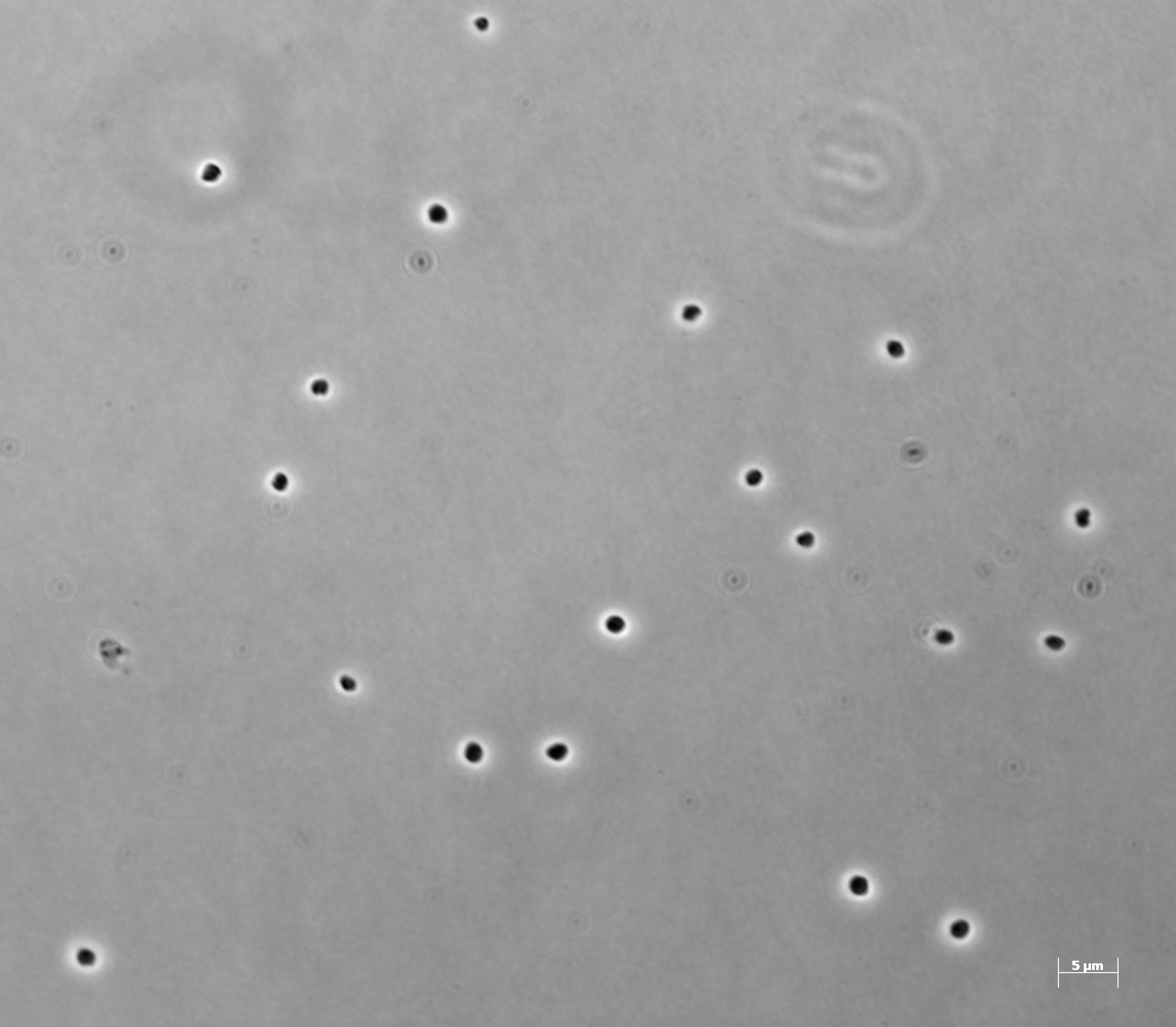
- Phase-contrast photos of Methanothermococcus thermolithotrophicus type strain SN 1. Scale bar 5 um.

Scientific classification
- Domain: Archaea
- Kingdom: Methanobacteriati
- Phylum: Methanobacteriota
- Class: Methanococci
- Order: Methanococcales
- Family: Methanococcaceae
- Genus: Methanothermococcus; Whitman 2002

Type species
- Methanothermococcus thermolithotrophicus (Huber et al. 1984) Whitman 2002

Species
- M. jasoni; M. okinawensis; M. thermolithotrophicus

= Methanothermococcus =

Genus of archaea

Methanothermococcus is a genus of archaeans in the family Methanococcaceae. The cells are shaped like irregular bars and tend to be Gram-negative. They are mobile via polar flagella. They require acetate to grow.

== Phylogeny ==
The currently accepted taxonomy is based on the List of Prokaryotic names with Standing in Nomenclature (LPSN) and National Center for Biotechnology Information (NCBI).

16S rRNA based LTP_07_2026

- - Methanofervidicoccus
  - - - Methanothermococcus~1
        - Methanothermococcus jasoni Rizzo et al. 2026
        - Methanothermococcus okinawensis Takai et al. 2002
    - - Methanococcus aeolicus
      - - Methanothermococcus thermolithotrophicus (Huber et al. 1984) Whitman 2002
        - Methanococcus

53 marker proteins based GTDB 11-RS232

- - - Methanofervidicoccus
      - M. abyssi
      - - Methanothermococcus okinawensis
        - Methanococcus aeolicus
  - - Methanothermococcus thermolithotrophicus
    - Methanococcus

== See also ==
- List of Archaea genera
