= Methanocaldococcaceae =

Scientific classification
- Domain: Archaea
- Kingdom: Methanobacteriati
- Phylum: Methanobacteriota
- Class: Methanococci
- Order: Methanococcales
- Family: Methanocaldococcaceae; Whitman et al. 2002

Genera
- Methanocaldococcus; Methanotorris

Synonyms
- "Methanocaldococcaceae" Boone, Whitman & Rouviére 1993

Family of archaea

Methanocaldococcaceae is a family of microbes within the order Methanococcales. It contains two genera, the type genus Methanocaldococcus and Methanotorris. These species are coccoid in form, neutrophilic to slightly acidophilic, and predominantly motile, and they have a very short generation period, from 25 to 45 minutes under optimal conditions. They produce energy exclusively through the reduction of carbon dioxide with hydrogen. Some species have been found in marine hydrothermal vents.

== Phylogeny ==
The currently accepted taxonomy is based on the List of Prokaryotic names with Standing in Nomenclature (LPSN) and National Center for Biotechnology Information (NCBI).

16S rRNA based LTP_07_2026

- - - Methanocaldococcaceae
      Methanocaldococcus
  - - - Methanocaldococcaceae~1
        Methanotorris
    - Methanococcaceae

53 marker proteins based GTDB 11-RS232

- - Methanocaldococcaceae
    Methanocaldococcus
  - Methanococcaceae
    - Methanotorris
    - other

== See also ==
- List of Archaea genera
