= Sulfurimonas autotrophica =

Scientific classification
- Domain: Bacteria
- Kingdom: Pseudomonadati
- Phylum: Campylobacterota
- Class: "Campylobacteria"
- Order: Campylobacterales
- Family: Helicobacteraceae
- Genus: Sulfurimonas
- Species: S. autotrophica

Binomial name
- Sulfurimonas autotrophica Inagaki et al. 2003

Species of bacterium

Sulfurimonas autotrophica is a sulfur- and thiosulfate-oxidizing bacterium. It is mesophilic, and its cells are short rods, each being motile by means of a single polar flagellum. Its genome has been sequenced.
