= Sulfurimonas =

Scientific classification
- Domain: Bacteria
- Kingdom: Pseudomonadati
- Phylum: Campylobacterota
- Class: "Campylobacteria"
- Order: Campylobacterales
- Family: Helicobacteraceae
- Genus: Sulfurimonas; Inagaki et al. 2003

Type species
- Sulfurimonas autotrophica Inagaki et al. 2003

Species
- See text

Genus of bacteria

Sulfurimonas is a bacterial genus within the class of Campylobacterota, known for reducing nitrate, oxidizing both sulfur and hydrogen, and containing Group IV hydrogenases. This genus consists of four species: Sulfurimonas autorophica, Sulfurimonas denitrificans, Sulfurimonas gotlandica, and Sulfurimonas paralvinellae. The genus' name is derived from "sulfur" in Latin and "monas" from Greek, together meaning a "sulfur-oxidizing rod". The size of the bacteria varies between about 1.5-2.5 μm in length and 0.5-1.0 μm in width. Members of the genus Sulfurimonas are found in a variety of different environments which include deep sea-vents, marine sediments, and terrestrial habitats. Their ability to survive in extreme conditions is attributed to multiple copies of one enzyme. Phylogenetic analysis suggests that members of the genus Sulfurimonas have limited dispersal ability and its speciation was affected by geographical isolation rather than hydrothermal composition. Deep ocean currents affect the dispersal of Sulfurimonas spp., influencing its speciation. As shown in the MLSA report of deep-sea hydrothermal vents Campylobacterota, Sulfurimonas has a higher dispersal capability compared with deep sea hydrothermal vent thermophiles, indicating allopatric speciation.

== Characteristics ==
Table 1. Specific characteristics of the four species within Sulfurimonas genus
Species	Size	Morphology	Movement	Temperature dependence	Habitat conditions	Optimal conditions	Doubling time under optimal conditions(hours)
Sulfurimonas autotrophica	1.5-2.5 x 0.5-1.0 μm	Rod	A single polar flagellum	Mesophilic	Temperature: 10 - 40 °C pH: 5 - 9	Temperature: 23 - 26 °CPH= 6.5	1.4
Sulfurimonas denitrificans	Variable length with width ~0.3μm	Short Rod or Spirilla-liked	N/A	Mesophilic	Temperature: 10-30 °C; pH: 7	Temperature: 22 °C PH=7	12
Sulfurimonas gotlandica	0.66±0.083 x 62.1±0.54 μm	Curved Rod or Spirilla-liked	One polar flagella or two flagella at opposite poles	Psychrotolerant	Temperature: 4 – 20 °C pH: 6.7–8.0	Temperature: 15 °C	13
Sulfurimonas paralvinellae	1.50–2.50 μm × 0.6–0.8 μm	Rod	moving flagellum 1.5–2.5 μm long and 0.6–0.8 μm wide	Mesophilic	Temp: 4-35 °C pH: 5.4-8.6	Temperature: 30 °C pH=6.1	13-16

== History of recognition ==
"Auto" and 'trophicos" are derived from Greek words, where "auto" means self and 'trophicos" refers to nursing, tending or feeding, which indicates its autotrophy. The abundance and distribution of subgroups within the Campylobacterota and the genusSulfurimonas have been detected in the water column using a number of techniques including 16S rRNA cloning, catalyzed reporter deposition and fluorescence in situ hybridization (CARD-FISH), and quantitative PCR measurements. Water samples were collected at different depths and the concentrations of nutrients, oxygen, and sulfur measured immediately after sampling. The sample was measured for carbon fixation rate, and the DNA extracted and specific sequences amplified by PCR.

The "denitrificans" portion in the name Sulfurimonas denitrificans (S. denitrificans) refers to its ability to reduce nitrate into di-nitrogen gas, a process known as denitrification. In 2006, Sulfurimonas denitrificans was the last species to be placed in the genus Sulfurimonas, as in 2000 it had been wrongly classified into the genus Thiomicrospira.

Studies of Sulfurimonas gotlandica (S. gotlandica) have mostly been from the Baltic Sea, using transmission electron microscopy and fluorescence microscopy with phosphotungstic acid and DAPI stain as forms of visualization.

Sulfurimonas paralvinellae was first obtained from a nest of deep-sea polychaete worms, particularly from the family Alvinellidae. Members from the genus Paralvinellae were found at a sulfide mound at a deep-sea hydrothermal vent in the Iheya North Field in the Mid-Okinawa Trough. The strain was initially separated from the nest via dilution-to-extinction technique. The strain was called GO25 T and had resembling physiological and phylogenetic characteristics of Sulfurimonas autotrophica. It was later determined that this species differs from Sulfurimonas autotrophica by having a distinct energy metabolism.

== Phylogeny ==
The currently accepted taxonomy is based on the List of Prokaryotic names with Standing in Nomenclature (LPSN) and National Center for Biotechnology Information (NCBI).

16S rRNA based LTP_10_2024

- Sulfurimonas
  - S. lithotrophica
  - - S. marina
    - - - S. autotrophica
        - - S. indica
          - S. paralvinellae
      - - S. gotlandica
        - - S. aquatica
          - - S. denitrificans
            - - S. crateris
              - S. xiamenensis

120 marker proteins based GTDB 10-RS226

- Sulfurimonas
  - - S. denitrificans (Timmer-ten Hoor 1975) Takai et al. 2006
    - - S. crateris Ratnikova et al. 2020
      - S. xiamenensis Wang et al. 2020
  - - S. lithotrophica Wang et al. 2020
    - - - S. aquatica Kojima et al. 2023
        - - "Ca. S. ponti" Van Vliet et al. 2021
          - - - "Ca. S. baltica" Henkel et al. 2021
              - "Ca. S. marisnigri" Henkel et al. 2019 ex Henkel et al. 2021
            - - S. gotlandica Labrenz et al. 2013
              - "S. hongkongensis" Cai et al. 2014
      - - S. marina Wang et al. 2022
        - - - S. indica Hu et al. 2021
            - S. paralvinellae Takai et al. 2006
          - - S. autotrophica Inagaki et al. 2003
            - - "S. hydrogeniphila" Wang et al. 2021
              - "S. sediminis" Wang et al. 2021

Unassigned species:

- "S. diazotrophicus" Zhong et al. 2025
- "Ca. S. kebritensis" Alamoudi et al. 2025
- "S. microaerophilus" Zhong et al. 2025

== Metabolism ==
Generally, bacteria have many pathways for metabolism, and in the case of members of the genus Sulfurimonas, this is how they are categorized into taxa. Members of the genus Sulfurimonas live in a wide range of environments, and play a vital role in chemoautotrophic processes, depending on the environment. Isolates of the four species in this genus have been shown to grow with a wide variety of electron acceptors and donors, allowing for members of the genus Sulfurimonas to grow in a wide variety of environments. Therefore, the success of Sulfurimonas spp. is credited to its ability to be a chemolithotroph, its flexible metabolism of changing electron acceptors/donors and sources of inorganic carbon, its oxygen tolerance and its ability to change with the environment. With differing environments, four types of energy metabolism are seen; including sulfur, hydrogen, nitrogen and carbon metabolism.

=== Sulfur metabolism ===
As a sulfur-oxidizing Epsilonproteobacterium, studies have found that Sulfurimonas spp. use a wide variety of electron donors for growth including sulfide, sulfur, thiosulfate, and sulfite. However, as shown below, not all species can use each of the mentioned electron donors (Table 2). Multiple strains of the genus are capable of Microbial Sulfur Disproportionation (MSD) of elemental sulfur and thiosulfate.

Sulfurimonas paralvinellae is able to use both molecular hydrogen and reduced sulfur for metabolism, which makes it only the second deep-sea Campylobacterota discovered to do so. Sulfurimonas paralvinellae is also capable of using yeast extract as a sulfur source. Molecular hydrogen is observed to yield a higher growth rate and is favored by Sulfurimonas paralvinellae over free reduced sulfur, even if the latter is present in the environment is excess. This can possibly be explained by the smaller amount of molecular hydrogen required to sustain growth in a bacterial cell as compared to reduced sulfur.

Table 2. List of electron donors for Sulfurimonas species.

	Sulfurimonas autorophica	Sulfurimonas denitrificans	Sulfurimonas gotlandica	Sulfurimonas paralvinellae
Sulfide	✓	✓	✓	X
Sulfur	✓	✓	✓	✓
Thiosulfate	✓	✓	✓	✓
Sulfite	X	X	✓	X
Hydrogen	X	✓	✓	✓

Sulfur Oxygenase Reductase (SOR) catalyzes sulfur, creating sulfite, thiosulfate and sulfide. SOR genes are found in S. gotlandica and S. autotrophica, but are absent in S. denitrificans. It's hypothesized that S. denitrificans lost SOR genes because of the low sulfide habitat in the Dutch Wadden Sea.

Except for S. paralvinellae, all Sulfurimonas species can use sulfide as an electron donor, by oxidizing sulfide into sulfate. The sulfide oxidizing pathway that's used is called sulfide:quinone reductase (SQR), and is coded by genes involved in the pathway responsible for catalyzing sulfide oxidation. There are six known types of SQR proteins in all the kingdoms. Most isolates of Epsiolonproteobacteria have SQRs classified as Type II, IV and VI, never have Type I and occasionally have Type III and V. Sulfurimonas is the only known genus in the Campylobacterota that has Type III and V SQRs. Type III is only found in S. denitrificans and S. gotlandica. Type IV SQR is highly conserved, and is found in all four species of Sulfurimonas and so is thought to be the most important SQR for cell survival in the genus Sulfurimonas. According to a study looking at heterologous expression of SQR homologs in S. denitrificans, it has three functional SQRs; Type II, III and IV. Another study also found that Type VI SQR was not in S. denitrificans, but that it was in the other three species. The researchers found that Type VI SQR functioning in high sulfide environments, and hypothesized that S. denitrificans doesn't require Type VI SQR because members of the species would have a low probability of encountering free sulfide. On the other hand, S. autotrophic is the only one of the four species that contains Type V SQRs, and was associated with organisms living in acid mines The exact roles for the functional SQRs remains unknown. However, in general, SQRs are crucial for sulfide oxidation, assimilation and signaling, energy generation and heavy-metal tolerance. Therefore, members of the genus Sulfurimonas are significant contributors to the global sulfur cycle as all members of the species oxidize sulfur to sulfate.

=== Hydrogen metabolism ===
All but one of the Sulfurimonas species can use hydrogen as an energy source to grow. Members of S. autotrophica are the only Sulfurimonas spp. to not use hydrogen, and has been shown to grow with hydrogen in aerobic and anaerobic conditions. In contrast, hydrogen is used as an electron donor at times by bacteria belonging to S. denitrificans, S. gotlandica, and S. paralvinellae, instead of sulfur-based compounds.

To catalyze hydrogen metabolism bacteria belonging to the genus Sulfurimonas use [NiFe]-hydrogenase. The reaction being $H_2 \longleftrightarrow 2H^+ + 2e^-$. There are many different [NiFe]-hydrogenases that are classified into different groups (Groups I to IV) and are found in all four Sulfurimonas species. Since S. autotrophica contains hydrogenases, a study has concluded that under specific environmental conditions it may be able to consume hydrogen.

Another study shows that S. denitrificans grows more efficiently with hydrogen than with thiosulfate. The three Sulfurimonas species express active hydrogen uptake hydrogenase and can grow on hydrogen. Where the bacteria live (i.e. marine water, sediments or hydrothermal vents) will affect the level of oxygen in the environment and therefore the kind of metabolism that they use.

=== Nitrogen metabolism ===
As far as we know, nitrogen metabolism occurs in all members belonging to Sulfurimonas species except S. autotrophica . It has been shown that S. autotrophica could not grow in a concentration of 5 mM sodium nitrate under laboratory conditions. Denitrification by Sulfurimonas spp. has a crucial role in nitrogen cycling. Nitrate turnover for S. denitrificans is 20 mM in three (with thiosulfate and hydrogen) to six days (thiosulfate and no hydrogen). The nitrate turnover in the other two species, S. gotlandica and S. paralvinellae, are quite different. S. gotlandica used only 1 mM nitrate within 9 days (with thiosulfate) and S. paralvinellae used 10 mM nitrate within 4 days (with hydrogen and sulfur). Additionally, S. gotlandica and S. denitrificans can use nitrite instead of nitrate as an electron acceptor. A list of the electron acceptors that Sulfurimonas species can use is summarized in Table 3.

Table 3. List of electron acceptors for Sulfurimonas species.

	Sulfurimonas autorophica	Sulfurimonas denitrificans	Sulfurimonas gotlandica	Sulfurimonas paralvinellae
Nitrate	X	✓	✓	✓
Nitrite	X	✓	✓	X
Oxygen	✓	✓	✓	✓

To catalyze the reaction of nitrogen metabolism, all Sulfurimonas species have a periplasmic nitrate reductase (Nap) catalytic subunit (NapA) . These epsiolonproteobacterial NapAs have a high affinity for nitrate and may represent an adaptation by members of this genus to low environmental nitrate concentrations at deep-sea vents .

Isolates of S. gotlandica and S. denitrificans are well adapted to the fluctuating oxygen and hydrogen sulphide concentrations in the environment because they can both use nitrate, nitrite or oxygen as electron acceptors. Their ability to use nitrate or nitrite as an electron acceptor, instead of oxygen, extends their ecological niche beyond anoxic to much deeper areas in the water column.

== Speciation ==
The species that constitute the genus Sulfurimonas are differentiated by their distinct physiological and genotypic differences. Many isolates have been partially or completely sequenced. For example, the genome of an isolate of S. autotrophica has approximately 2,153,198 base pairs .

Members of this bacterial genus inhabit sulfidic water, pelagic redox zones, and deep-sea vents, where sulfur-containing compounds are abundant. Species in the genus Sulfurimonas use a variety of proteins that catalyze specific compounds found in these areas, which further highlights the commonalities and differences in their DNA genomes.

The similarities in the 16S rRNA gene sequences among Sulfurimonas gotlandica, Sulfurimonas paralvinellae, Sulfurimonas autotrophica, and Sulfurimonas dentrificans are greater than 90%, with S. gotlandica shares a similarity of 93.7 to 94.2% with the other species. Similarly, S. paralvinellae and S. autotrophica (OK10 strain) have 96.3% sequence similarity in their 16S rRNA gene sequences, while S. dentrificans and S. autotrophica (OK10) have a 93.5% sequence similarity.

The G + C content of some of the species' genomes is similar. S. gotlandica contains a DNA G + C content of 33.6 mol% (A + T, 66.4 mol%), while S. paralvinellae has 37.6 mol% of DNA G + C content (63.4 mol% A + T).

Phylogenetic analysis have shown that Sulfurimonas exhibits limited dispersal ability in that speciation is affected by geographical location more than hydrothermal composition. In addition, deep-ocean currents can affect speciation.

The following table summarizes the information provided above:

Table 4: DNA Content and 16s rRNA Gene Similarity between Sulfurimonas

	DNA G + C Content (mol %)	DNA A + T Content (mol%)	16s rRNA Gene Similarity (%)
Sulfurimonas autotrophica	N/A	N/A	96.3% similarity with S. paralvinellae. 93.7-94.2% similarity with S. gotlandica. 93.5% similarity with S. dentrificans.
Sulfurimonas dentrificans	N/A	N/A	93.5% similarity with S. autrotrophica (OK10). 93.7-94.2% similarity with S. gotlandica.
Sulfurimonas gotlandica	33.6 mol%	66.4 mol%	93.7 - 94.2% similarity with ALL species.
Sulfurimonas paralvinellae	37.6 mol%	63.4 mol%	96.3% similarity with S. autrotrophica (OK10). 93.7-94.2% similarity with S. gotlandica.

== Habitat ==
Sulfurimonas are commonly found in (sulfidogenic) habitats, such as marine sediments, deep-sea hydrothermal vents, pelagic redoxclines and oil fields . The habitats where they are found is reflected in their gene content; some members have fewer genes while others have more genes that are related to the environments where they occur. Some of these genes allow the use of different electron donors and acceptors, enabling them to inhabit a range on environments. In deep-sea hydrothermal vents sulfide oxidation is the most important chemical energy source for Sulfurimonas spp. Coincidentally, high concentrations of hydrogen sulfide at deep-sea vents are produced by high temperature seawater-rock interactions . It is notable that microorganisms living in the deep, dark ocean oxidize sulfur compounds for chemolithoautotrophy; this process is microbially mediated . For example, sulfide quinone reductases (SQRs), found in all isolates of Sulfurimonas spp. aids in the oxidation of sulfur- and thiosulfate-containing compounds. As well, hydrogenases and other enzymes allow this particular genus to colonize 'disparate' environments. Due to the dependence on sulfur-containing compounds in the deep sea, this could create competition among species.

Bacterial mats are found at ~100 m water depth next to active hydrothermal vents. Phylogenetic analysis showed that those bacterial mats consisted of bacteria within the genus Sulfurimonas . Similar bacterial mats are found commonly on seamounts created by underwater volcanoes, and by the instense volcanism at hydrothermal vents. Hydrothermal venting favors the growth of bacterial mats in which Sulfurimonas occurs, such as at the Kamaʻehuakanaloa, Axial, Vailulu'u, and Suiyo Seamounts, and the Mariana and Kermadec Arcs.

== Biotic interactions ==
=== Predation ===
Sulfurimonas (subgroup GD17) dominates chemotrophic denitrification in the Baltic Sea pelagic redoxclines. Using methods such as predator assays and bacterial amendment cultures, it was found that the population of Sulfurimonas (subgroup GD17) had a doubling time of 1 to 1.5 days, which is much more than their average doubling time under the optimal conditions shown in Table 1. However, grazing can consume the population over the course of one day. Five active grazers that are typically found in redoxclines ciliates (Oligohymenophorea, Prostomatea), and marine flagellate groups (MAST-4, Chrysophyta, Cercozoa), were found through the use of RNA-SIP. In cold-seep ecosystem, Lithodid crabs (Paralomis sp.), which are filter eaters, feed on thiotropic bacterial mats, which consist of many different types of bacteria.

It was found that in the absence of other possible predictors, bacteria belonging to the genus Sulfurimonas grow in a unimodal relationship, suggesting they increase in bacterial diversity and productivity. This means that without predictors, these bacteria can differentiate and grow exponentially .

=== Symbiosis ===
Sulfurimonas is a genus that is commonly observed in symbiosis with other organisms, mostly marine ringed worms. Sulfurimonas paralvinellae is associated with deep-sea polychaete colonies located adjacent to hydrothermal vents. Nests of these worms are covered with reduced sulfur particles produced by a combination of microbiological and chemical processes. These sulfur particles serve as a readily available energy source for bacteria belonging to the genus Sulfurimonas.

Bioturbation by lugworms in shallow-water environments in the absence of oxygen enhances the metabolism of bacteria in the Epsilonproteobacterium phylotype, which shows more than 95% similarity to Sulfurimonas denitrificans. Lugworm activities such as burrowing and peristaltic pumping make oxygen and carbon dioxide dissolved in the water go into the sediment. This enriched layer moves down and mixes with underlying sediment. Oxygen that is taken from the water penetrates this anaerobic layer and creates sulphate available to be used by bacteria for metabolism. Sulphide from the water may also be detoxified by lugworms by either a branched respiratory chain or redox regulation of sulphide oxidation. The end product of these reactions is thiosulphate, which becomes another energy source for chemoautotrophic bacteria colonizing the sediment

=== Competition ===
Bacteria belonging to the genus Sulfurimonas are in competition with other sulfate-oxidizing bacteria (SOB) for nutritional resources, and have been studied intensively due to their importance in the petroleum industry. SOB communities constitute physiologically diverse members, such as the genera Sulfurimonas, Chlorobia, and Chloroflexi. All of these genera are found in petroleum reservoirs, and Sulfurimonas are present in high abundances. Members of this genus occupied approximately 26% of reservoirs, all of which differ in temperature and relative proportions of other SOB, which is further an indication that this genus is capable of growth at a wide range of temperatures. Despite this, Sulfurimonas are in competition with Thioclava, Sulfuricurvum, and Thiohalomonas, which correlate with 15.4%, 12.0%, and 17.0% respectively. The majority of bacteria present in these reservoirs are uncultured bacteria, which have not been studied deeply. Bacteria of the aforementioned genera derive their energy from the oxidation of reduced sulfur compounds (i.e. sulfide and thiosulfate), which suggests direct competition among them for sulfur-containing compounds

== Food chain/web ==
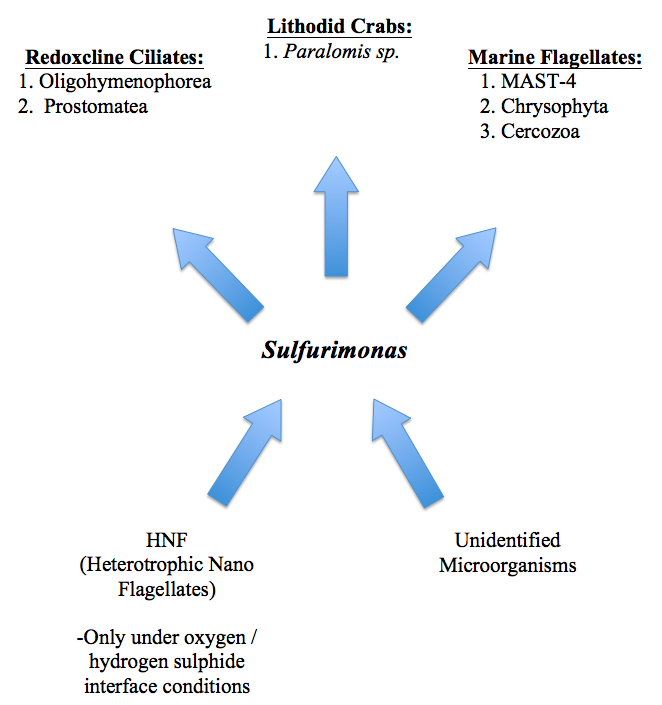
Fig 7. Simplified Sulfurimonas Food Web / Chain

Members of the bacterial genus Sulfurimonas are known to affect the relative abundance of species around them. In the case of S. gotlandica strain GD1, it was demonstrated that heterotrophic nanoflagellate (HNF) populations decreased while ciliate and dinoflagellate abundances remained relatively constant in oxygen / hydrogen sulphide rich conditions. Conversely, the opposite trend was observed in suboxic conditions, in that HNF and ciliates increased in abundance, whereas dinoflagellates remained constant. These changes were attributed to both the presence of oxygen / hydrogen sulphide in the environment and the potential predation of HNF by S. gotlandica.

In another study, it was found that five active grazers resides in redoxcline conditions, namely redoxcline ciliates, marine flagellate groups, and some cold-seep ecosystem species. In fact, these organisms are able to consume the entire Sulfurimonas population in that particular area in a day

== Environmental relevance ==
In order to grow, Sulfurimonas species consume both reduced sulfur species and oxidized nitrogen species. Therefore, members of Sulfurimonas directly affect biogeochemical cycling of these elements in environments where they exist and are numerically abundant. For example, Sulfurimonas gotlandica may account for up to 25% of the microbial community in the Baltic sea redoxcline based on CARD-FISH cell counts and Sulfurimonas spp. accounted for a significant number of the Campylobacterota reads in a survey of microbial diversity at deep-sea diffuse flow vents using amplified 16S sequences.

== Further research ==
Sulfurimonas hongkongensis is a newly discovered species within the genus of Sulfurimonas. It was found in Hong Kong, near the coastal sediment at the Kai Tak Approach Channel connecting Victoria Harbour . It produces energy under anoxic conditions. Its electron donor is thiosulfate, sulfide or hydrogen, and its electron acceptor is nitrate . Its morphology is rod-shaped, and it grows at 15-35 °C (optimum at 30 °C), pH 6.5-8.5 (optimum at 7.0-7.5), and 10-60 g L^{−1} NaCl (optimum at 30 g L^{−1}) . Its genome consists of 34.9% GC content, 2,290 protein-coding genes, and 42 RNA genes (3 rRNA genes). Its major cellular fatty acids were C14:0 (4.8%), C16:0 (32.8%), 2-OH C16:0 (9.5%), C16:1 (14.6%), C18:0 (16.9%), and C18:1 (19.2%). The composition of these fatty acids are similar to those found in isolates of Sulfurimonas paralvinellae' and Sulfurimonas autotrophica', but there is a unique fatty acid, represented by 2-OH C16:0 that defined it is a different species from other members of the genus of Sulfurimonas.

== See also ==
- List of bacteria genera
- List of bacterial orders
