= Methanocaldococcus jannaschii =

Scientific classification
- Domain: Archaea
- Kingdom: Methanobacteriati
- Phylum: Methanobacteriota
- Class: Methanococci
- Order: Methanococcales
- Family: Methanocaldococcaceae
- Genus: Methanocaldococcus
- Species: M. jannaschii

Binomial name
- Methanocaldococcus jannaschii (Jones et al. 1984) Whitman 2002

Synonyms
- Methanococcus jannaschii Jones et al. 1984

Species of archaeon

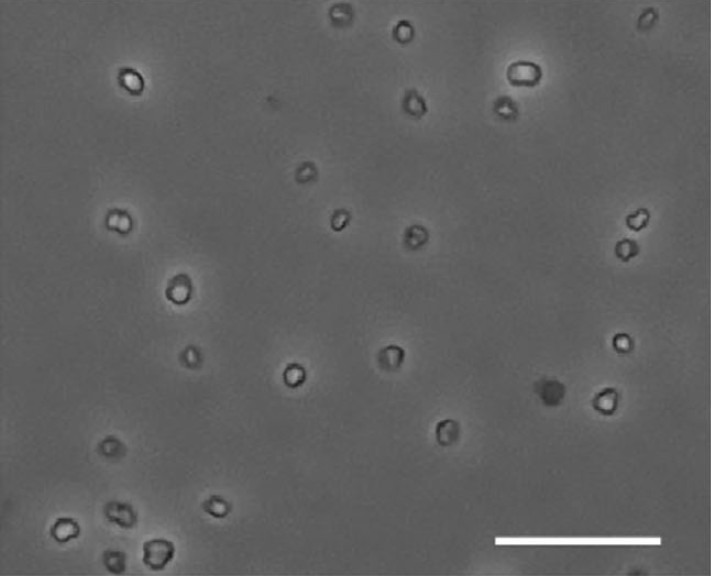
Optical micrograph of Methanocaldococcus jannaschii cells. Scale bar = 10 μm

Methanocaldococcus jannaschii (formerly Methanococcus jannaschii) is a thermophilic methanogenic archaeon in the class Methanococci that lives at temperatures from 48° to 94 °C and at pressures of more than 200 atmospheres. It was the first archaeon, and third organism, to have its complete genome sequenced. The sequencing identified many genes unique to the archaea. Many of the synthesis pathways for methanogenic cofactors were worked out biochemically in this organism, as were several other archaeal-specific metabolic pathways.

== History ==
Methanocaldococcus jannaschii was isolated from a submarine hydrothermal vent at Woods Hole Oceanographic Institution. The hydrothermal vent was located in the East Pacific Rise, at a depth of 2600 m, near the western coast of Mexico. Surface material was collected at a "white smoker" chimney which revealed evidence of Methanocaldococcus jannaschii living in this extreme habitat of temperatures from 48 - 94 °C. Like many kinds of extremophiles, M. jannaschii possess the ability to adapt to high temperatures, high pressure, and moderate salinity.

== Genome ==
The genome of Methanocaldococcus jannaschii was sequenced by a group at TIGR led by Craig Venter using whole-genome shotgun sequencing. M. jannaschii represented the first member of the Archaea to have its genome sequenced. According to Venter, the unique features of the genome provided strong evidence that there are three domains of life. Methanocaldococcus has a large circular chromosome that is 1.66 mega base pairs long with a G+C content of 31.4%. The species also has a large and a small circular extra-chromosomal element (ECE). The ECEs encode 44 and 12 genes, respectively.

The initial genome analysis revealed 1738 protein-coding genes of which 56% had not similarity to any other known genes at the time. Notably, genes that encode proteins of the translation and transcription machinery turned out to be more similar to eukaryotic proteins than eubacterial proteins, a prediction that was already made by Carl Woese.

== Taxonomy ==
Methanocaldoccus jannaschii is a member of the genus Methanocaldococcus (previously a part of Methanococcus) and is therefore sometimes referred to as a "class I" methanogen (e.g. ).

== Biology and biochemistry ==
Methanocaldococcus jannaschii is a thermophilic methanogen, meaning it grows by making methane as a metabolic byproduct. It is only capable of growth on carbon dioxide and hydrogen as primary energy sources, unlike many other methanococci (such as Methanococcus maripaludis) which can also use formate as a primary energy source. The genome includes many hydrogenases, such as a 5,10-methenyltetrahydromethanopterin hydrogenase, a ferredoxin hydrogenase (eha), and a coenzyme F420 hydrogenase.

Proteomic studies showed that M. jannaschii contains a large number of inteins: 19 were discovered by one study.

Many novel metabolic pathways have been worked out in M. jannaschii, including the pathways for synthesis of many methanogenic cofactors, riboflavin, and novel amino acid synthesis pathways. Many information processing pathways have also been studied in this organism, such as an archaeal-specific DNA polymerase family. Information about single-pass transmembrane proteins from M. jannaschii was compiled in Membranome database.

== Relevance and Research ==
Due to the amount of information that was gained from sequencing, several research interests have developed. One area of interest is the hyperthermophilic enzymes that Methanococcus jannaschii produces in hopes of understanding enzyme evolution or even enzyme catalytic mechanisms. Research on mutagenesis has focused on seeing if these enzymes, which are typically optimal at high temperatures, can be just as active in low temperatures. M. jannaschii has been a model system for in vivo genetic studies. Since M. jannaschii is an extremophile several astrobiology research projects have begun looking into methane producing bacteria.
