= Sulfurimonas paralvinellae =

Scientific classification
- Domain: Bacteria
- Kingdom: Pseudomonadati
- Phylum: Campylobacterota
- Class: "Campylobacteria"
- Order: Campylobacterales
- Family: Helicobacteraceae
- Genus: Sulfurimonas
- Species: S. paralvinellae

Binomial name
- Sulfurimonas paralvinellae Takai et al. 2006

Species of bacterium

Sulfurimonas paralvinellae is a hydrogen- and sulfur-oxidizing bacterium. It is a mesophilic chemolithoautotroph.
