= Methanococcaceae =

Scientific classification
- Domain: Archaea
- Kingdom: Methanobacteriati
- Phylum: Methanobacteriota
- Class: Methanococci
- Order: Methanococcales
- Family: Methanococcaceae; Balch and Wolfe 1981

Genera
- Methanococcus; Methanofervidicoccus; Methanothermococcus

Family of archaea

Methanococcaceae is a family of archaeans in the order Methanococcales. These organisms produce methane from formate or through the reduction of carbon dioxide with hydrogen. They live in marshes and other coastal areas. Members of the genus Methanothermococcus have been found in deep-sea hydrothermal vents.

== Phylogeny ==
The currently accepted taxonomy is based on the List of Prokaryotic names with Standing in Nomenclature (LPSN) and National Center for Biotechnology Information (NCBI).

16S rRNA based LTP_07_2026

- - Methanocaldococcaceae~1
    Methanotorris Whitman 2002
  - Methanococcaceae
    - Methanofervidicoccus Sakai et al. 2019
    - - Methanothermococcus~1
      - - Methanococcus aeolicus Kendall et al. 2006
        - - Methanothermococcus (Huber et al. 1984) Whitman 2002
          - Methanococcus Kluyver & van Niel 1936

53 marker proteins based GTDB 11-RS232

- Methanococcaceae
  - Methanotorris
  - - Methanofervidicoccus
    - - Methanothermococcus
      - Methanococcus

== See also ==
- List of Archaea genera
