= Alanine dehydrogenase =

Enzyme

alanine dehydrogenase

Identifiers
- EC no.: 1.4.1.1
- CAS no.: 9029-06-5

Databases
- IntEnz: IntEnz view
- BRENDA: BRENDA entry
- ExPASy: NiceZyme view
- KEGG: KEGG entry
- MetaCyc: metabolic pathway
- PRIAM: profile
- PDB structures: RCSB PDB PDBe PDBsum
- Gene Ontology: AmiGO / QuickGO
Search
- PMC: articles
- PubMed: articles
- NCBI: proteins

Alanine dehydrogenase (EC 1.4.1.1) is an enzyme that catalyzes the chemical reaction

alanine
+ NAD^{+}
H_{2}O
H^{+}
H_{2}O
H^{+}
pyruvic acid
+ NADH + NH_{3}

The three substrates of this enzyme are alanine, water, and oxidised nicotinamide adenine dinucleotide (NAD^{+}). Its products are pyruvic acid, reduced NADH, ammonia, and a proton.

This enzyme participates in taurine and hypotaurine metabolism and reductive carboxylate cycle (CO_{2} fixation).

== Nomenclature ==
This enzyme belongs to the family of oxidoreductases, specifically those acting on the CH-NH_{2} group of donors with NAD^{+} or NADP^{+} as acceptor. The systematic name of this enzyme class is L-alanine:NAD^{+} oxidoreductase (deaminating). Other names in common use include AlaDH, L-alanine dehydrogenase, NAD^{+}-linked alanine dehydrogenase, alpha-alanine dehydrogenase, NAD^{+}-dependent alanine dehydrogenase, alanine oxidoreductase, and NADH-dependent alanine dehydrogenase. T

== Structure ==
Alanine dehydrogenase contains both a N-terminus and C-terminus domains.
