= Methanocaldococcus =

Scientific classification
- Domain: Archaea
- Kingdom: Methanobacteriati
- Phylum: Methanobacteriota
- Class: Methanococci
- Order: Methanococcales
- Family: Methanocaldococcaceae
- Genus: Methanocaldococcus; Whitman 2002

Type species
- Methanocaldococcus jannaschii (Jones et al. 1984) Whitman 2002

Species
- M. abyssi; M. bathoardescens; M. fervens; M. indicus; M. infernus; M. jannaschii; M. lauensis; M. villosus; M. vulcanius

Genus of archaea

Methanocaldococcus formerly known as Methanococcus is a genus of coccoid methanogen archaea. They are all thermophiles, including M. infernus and the hyperthermophilic M. jannaschii. The latter was discovered at the base of a “white smoker” chimney at 21°N on the East Pacific Rise and it was the first archaean genome to be completely sequenced, revealing many novel and eukaryote-like elements.

== Nomenclature ==
The name Methanocaldococcus has Latin and Greek roots, methano for methane, caldo for hot, and the Greek kokkos for the spherical shape of the cells. Overall, the name means spherical cell that produces methane at hot temperatures.

== Metabolism ==
All species in Methanocaldococcus are obligate methanogens. They use hydrogen to reduce carbon dioxide. Unlike many other species within Euryarchaeota, they cannot use formate, acetate, methanol or methylamines as substrates.

== Phylogeny ==
The currently accepted taxonomy is based on the List of Prokaryotic names with Standing in Nomenclature (LPSN) and National Center for Biotechnology Information (NCBI).

16S rRNA based LTP_07_2026

- Methanocaldococcus
  - M. villosus Bellack et al. 2011
  - - - M. indicus L'Haridon et al. 2003
      - M. infernus (Jeanthon et al. 1998) Whitman 2002
    - - M. vulcanius (Jeanthon et al. 1999) Whitman 2002
      - - M. lauensis L'Haridon et al. 2023
        - - M. fervens (Jeanthon et al. 1999) Whitman 2002
          - - M. bathoardescens Stewart et al. 2015
            - - M. abyssi L'Haridon & Nesbø 2026
              - M. jannaschii (Jones et al. 1984) Whitman 2002 (type sp.)

53 marker proteins based GTDB 11-RS232

- Methanocaldococcus
  - M. fervens
  - - M. bathoardescens
    - - - M. jannaschii
        - M. vulcanius
      - - M. lauensis
        - - M. villosus
          - - M. indicus
            - M. infernus

== See also ==
- List of Archaea genera
- Methanocaldococcus sp. FS406-22
