= Sulfur oxygenase/reductase =

Class of enzymes

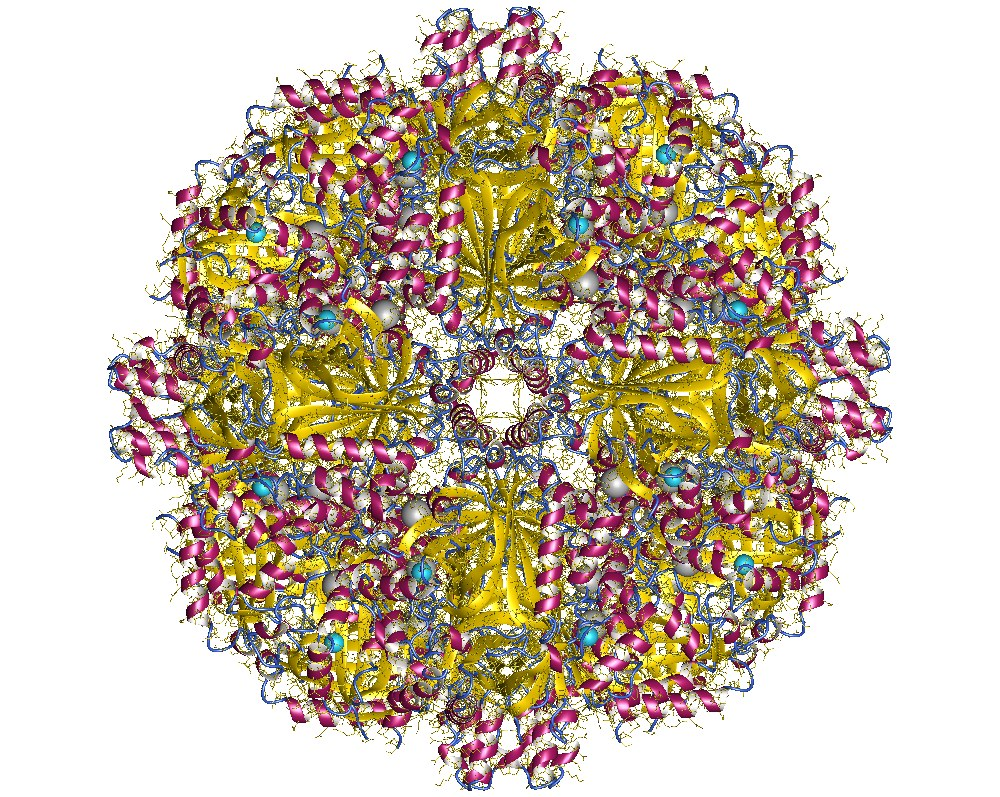
- Sulfur oxygenase reductase homo24mer, Acidianus ambivalens

Identifiers
- EC no.: 1.13.11.55

Databases
- IntEnz: IntEnz view
- BRENDA: BRENDA entry
- ExPASy: NiceZyme view
- KEGG: KEGG entry
- MetaCyc: metabolic pathway
- PRIAM: profile
- PDB structures: RCSB PDB PDBe PDBsum
Search
- PMC: articles
- PubMed: articles
- NCBI: proteins

In enzymology, a sulfur oxygenase/reductase (EC 1.13.11.55) is an enzyme that catalyzes the chemical reaction

4 sulfur + 4 H_{2}O + O_{2} $\rightleftharpoons$ 2 hydrogen sulfide + 2 bisulfite + 2 H^{+}

The three substrates of this enzyme are sulfur, H_{2}O, and O_{2}, whereas its three products are hydrogen sulfide, bisulfite, and H^{+}.

This enzyme belongs to the family of oxidoreductases, specifically those acting on single donors with O_{2} as the oxidant and incorporating two atoms of oxygen into the substrate (oxygenases). The oxygen incorporated need not be derived from O_{2}. The systematic name of this enzyme class is sulfur:oxygen oxidoreductase (hydrogen-sulfide- and sulfite-forming). Other names in common use include SOR, sulfur oxygenase, and sulfur oxygenase reductase.
