= Protamoebae =

Scientific classification
- Domain: Eukaryota
- Clade: Amorphea
- Phylum: Amoebozoa
- Subphylum: Protamoebae

Classes
- Breviatea; Variosea

Phylum of protozoans

Protamoebae is a grouping of Amoebozoa.
