= Methanococci =

Scientific classification
- Domain: Archaea
- Kingdom: Methanobacteriati
- Phylum: Methanobacteriota
- Class: Methanococci; Boone 2002

Order
- Methanococcales

Synonyms
- "Methanococcia" Oren, Parte & Garrity 2016; Methanothermea Cavalier-Smith 2002

Class of archaea

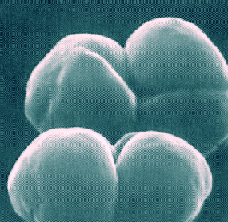

Methanococci is a class of methanogenic archaea in the phylum Methanobacteriota. They can be mesophilic, thermophilic or hyperthermophilic.

== See also ==
- List of Archaea genera
