= Methanococcales =

Scientific classification
- Domain: Archaea
- Kingdom: Methanobacteriati
- Phylum: Methanobacteriota
- Class: Methanococci
- Order: Methanococcales; Balch and Wolfe 1981

Families
- Methanocaldococcaceae; Methanococcaceae

Order of archaea

Methanococcales is an order of archaeans in the class Methanococci.

== Phylogeny ==
The currently accepted taxonomy is based on the List of Prokaryotic names with Standing in Nomenclature (LPSN) and National Center for Biotechnology Information (NCBI).

16S rRNA based LTP_07_2026

- - Methanocaldococcaceae
  - - Methanocaldococcaceae~1
    - Methanococcaceae

53 marker proteins based GTDB 11-RS232

- - Methanocaldococcaceae
  - Methanococcaceae

== See also ==
- List of Archaea genera
