= Haloterrigena =

Scientific classification
- Domain: Archaea
- Kingdom: Methanobacteriati
- Phylum: Methanobacteriota
- Class: Halobacteria
- Order: Natrialbales
- Family: Natrialbaceae
- Genus: Haloterrigena; Ventosa et al. 1999

Type species
- Haloterrigena turkmenica (Zvyagintseva & Tarasov 1989) Ventosa et al. 1999

Species
- H. alkaliphila; H. gelatinilytica; H. salfodinae; H. salina; H. salinisoli; H. turkmenica; "H. turpansis"

Genus of archaea

Haloterrigena (common abbreviation Htg.) is a genus of archaeans in the family Natrialbaceae.

== Phylogeny ==
The currently accepted taxonomy is based on the List of Prokaryotic names with Standing in Nomenclature (LPSN) and National Center for Biotechnology Information (NCBI).

16S rRNA based LTP_07_2026

- Haloterrigena
  - H. alkaliphila
  - - H. turkmenica
    - - H. salinisoli
      - - H. salifodinae
        - H. salina

53 marker proteins based GTDB 11-RS232

- Haloterrigena
  - H. alkaliphila Bao et al. 2022
  - - H. salinisoli Dong et al. 2025
    - - H. turkmenica (Zvyagintseva & Tarasov 1989) Ventosa et al. 1999
      - - H. gelatinilytica Liu et al. 2025
        - - H. salifodinae Chen et al. 2020
          - H. salina Gutiérrez et al. 2008

== Taxonomy ==
Species formerly placed in this taxon

- Haloterrigena daqingensis, now Natronorubrum daqingense
- Haloterrigena hispanica, now Natrinema hispanicum
- Haloterrigena limicola, now Natrinema limicola
- Haloterrigena longa, now Natrinema longum
- Haloterrigena mahii, now Natrinema mahii
- Haloterrigena saccharevitans, now Natrinema saccharevitans
- Haloterrigena thermotolerans, now Natrinema thermotolerans

H. jeotgali is proposed to be a synonym of Natrinema thermotolerans, but as of 2022, is still considered a valid name.

== See also ==
- List of Archaea genera
