= Halostagnicola larsenii =

Scientific classification
- Domain: Archaea
- Kingdom: Methanobacteriati
- Phylum: Methanobacteriota
- Class: Halobacteria
- Order: Natrialbales
- Family: Natrialbaceae
- Genus: Halostagnicola
- Species: H. larsenii

Binomial name
- Halostagnicola larsenii Castillo et al. 2006

Type strain
- Strain XH-48; CECT 7116; CGMCC 1.5338; DSM 17691; JCM 13463

Species of archaeon

Halostagnicola larsenii is a non-motile, aerobic, gram-negative, rod shaped archaeon. It is a halophilic, neutrophilic, chemo-organotroph and was isolated from samples taken from a saline lake in Inner Mongolia, China. The etymology of the name comes from hals, halos Greek for salt, stagnum Latin for a piece of standing water, -cola Latin for inhabitant or dweller, and Larsenii named after the Norwegian microbiologist, Helge Larsen, who was a pioneer in research regarding halophiles.

== Discovery ==
In September 2003, researchers from the University of Seville, Spain, obtained samples of sediment from Lake Xilinholt in Inner Mongolia, China. Lake Xilinholt is an extremely saline lake, thus providing the optimum growth conditions for Halostagnicola larsenii . The samples were cultivated in a 20% saline solution. Nutrient agar plates were used to cultivate the samples. The media contained sodium chloride and was optimized at a pH of 7.5. H. larsenii grows optimally at 15% NaCl, 37 °C and pH 7–8. It is unable to grow at temperatures above 50 °C. Further characterization of the species was conducted and it was proposed by Castillo et al., that strain XH-48 be identified as a new species within the Halostagnicola phylum.

== Characterization ==
=== Morphology ===
Morphology was determined using phase contrast optics by an Olympus BX41 microscope. Cells of Halostagnicola larsenii XH48 are 0.5-1.0 micrometers wide and 1.0-3.0 micrometers long. Cells of H. larsenii are pleomorphic, and display rod, square or disc shaped cells. This reflects the strain's ability to change size and shape in response to changes in the environment, such as salinity. The colony morphology of H. larsenii is circular, smooth, opaque and pink in color. Polar ether lipids found in its membrane include phosphatidylglycerol and phosphatidylglyceromethylphosphate. These lipids were extracted with chloroform and methanol. Tests revealed this organism is oxidase positive and catalase negative.

=== Metabolism ===
Halostagnicola larsenii is a halophilic, neutrophilic, chemo-organotroph and uses oxygen as its terminal electron acceptor. H. larsenii can utilize a variety of carbohydrates such as fructose, glycerol, lactose, glucose, arabinose, acetate, ribose, starch, maltose, galactose, ribose, xylose, glutamate, and propionate as substrates for growth. Growth substrates were determined through the use of the isolation medium, which contained the substrate being tested along with yeast extract. Additionally, H. larsenii undergoes assimilatory nitrate reduction to nitrite to ammonia. This process differs from nitrate reduction because it occurs aerobically and uses ferrodoxin as an electron donor.

=== Antibiotic resistance ===
H. larsenii is resistant to the following antibiotics: ampicillin, chloramphenicol, erythromycin, gentamicin, nalidixic acid, neomycin, penicillin G, rifampicin, streptomycin, and tetracycline. The organism is sensitive to bacitracin and novobiocin. Antibiotic sensitivity and resistance was determined using the agar diffusion test in which paper discs saturated with antibiotics were placed on agar plates.

=== Ecology ===
Halostagnicola larsenii was originally discovered in a saline lake in Inner Mongolia, China. It has also been isolated from rock pit sea water in the West Coast of Maharashtra, India. Typically, haloarchaea such as H. larsenii require high salinity environments for growth and can be found in the sediment of aquatic environments such as freshwater lakes.

=== Genomics ===
In 2014, the complete genome of H. larsenii was sequenced using Illumina dye sequencing HiSeq 2000 by Iain Anderson as part of the Archaeal Tree of Life Project supported by the Joint Genome Institute. The genome consists of 2.79 Mega-bases on a circular chromosome with four circular plasmids. The genome includes 4,246 genes of which 4,171 are protein coding genes, 19 are pseudogenes, 6 rRNA genes, and 49 tRNA genes. The GC-content of the genome is 61%.

In a 2008 study by Castillo, et al., chromosomal DNA was isolated using the Marmur methods of simple cell disruption by detergent lysis, nucleic extraction by an organic solvent, and DNA recovery by ethanol precipitation were used. The 16S ribosomal RNA gene sequence of H. larsenii was studied using ARB software. The neighbor-joining method was used to conduct 16s rRNA gene sequence analysis and determine phylogenetic relationships. The closest neighboring species Natrialba aegypitaca and Natrialba asiatica had a 94.5% and 93.3% genome similarity, respectively. The key difference from Natrialba is that H. larsenii lacks the key bases 403G and 560G.
