= Iron-oxidizing bacteria =

Bacteria deriving energy from dissolved iron

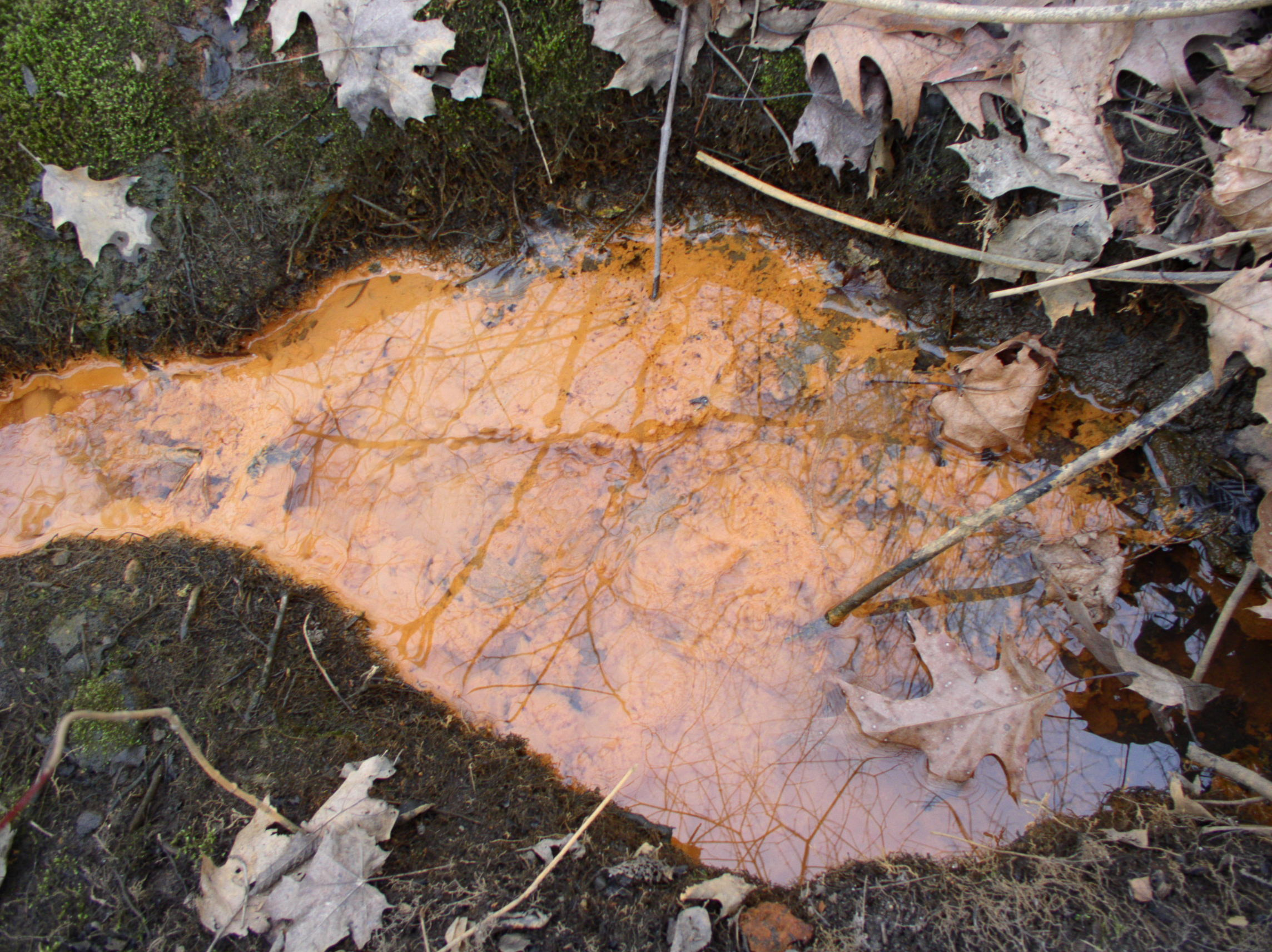
Iron-oxidizing bacteria in surface water

Iron-oxidizing bacteria (or iron bacteria) are chemotrophic bacteria that derive energy by oxidizing dissolved iron. They are known to grow and proliferate in waters containing iron concentrations as low as 0.1 mg/L. However, at least 0.3 ppm of dissolved oxygen is needed to carry out the oxidation.

When de-oxygenated water reaches a source of oxygen, iron bacteria convert dissolved iron into an insoluble reddish-brown gelatinous slime that discolors stream beds and can stain plumbing fixtures, clothing, or utensils washed with the water carrying it.

Organic material dissolved in water is often the underlying cause of an iron-oxidizing bacteria population. Groundwater may be naturally de-oxygenated by decaying vegetation in swamps. Useful mineral deposits of bog iron ore have formed where groundwater has historically emerged and been exposed to atmospheric oxygen. Anthropogenic hazards like landfill leachate, septic drain fields, or leakage of light petroleum fuels like gasoline are other possible sources of organic materials allowing soil microbes to de-oxygenate groundwater.

A similar reaction may form black deposits of manganese dioxide from dissolved manganese but is less common because of the relative abundance of iron (5.4%) in comparison to manganese (0.1%) in average soils. The sulfurous smell of rot or decay sometimes associated with iron-oxidizing bacteria results from the enzymatic conversion of soil sulfates to volatile hydrogen sulfide as an alternative source of oxygen in anaerobic water.

Iron is a very important chemical element required by living organisms to carry out numerous metabolic reactions such as the formation of proteins involved in biochemical reactions. Examples of these proteins include iron–sulfur proteins, hemoglobin, and coordination complexes. Iron has a widespread distribution globally and is considered one of the most abundant elements in the Earth's crust, soil, and sediments. Iron is a trace element in marine environments. Its role as the electron donor of some chemolithotrophs is probably very ancient.

== Metabolism ==
The anoxygenic phototrophic oxidation of iron was the first anaerobic metabolism to be described within the iron anaerobic oxidation metabolism. These photoferrotrophic bacteria use Fe^{2+} as electron donor and the energy from light to assimilate CO_{2} into biomass through the Calvin Benson-Bassam cycle (or rTCA cycle) in a neutrophilic environment (pH 5.5-7.2), producing Fe^{3+} oxides as a waste product that precipitates as a mineral, according to the following stoichiometry (4 mM of Fe(II) can yield 1 mM of CH_{2}O):

HCO^{−}_{3} + 4Fe(II) + 10H_{2}O → [CH_{2}O] + 4Fe(OH)_{3} + 7H^{+} (∆G° > 0)

Nevertheless, some bacteria do not use the photoautotrophic Fe(II) oxidation metabolism for growth purposes. Instead, it has been suggested that these groups are sensitive to Fe(II) and therefore oxidize Fe(II) into more insoluble Fe(III) oxide to reduce its toxicity, enabling them to grow in the presence of Fe(II). On the other hand, based on experiments with Rhodobacter capsulatus SB1003 (photoheterotrophic), it has been demonstrated that the oxidation of Fe(II) might be the mechanisms whereby the bacteria are enabled to access organic carbon sources (acetate, succinate) whose use depends on Fe(II) oxidation. Nonetheless, many iron-oxidizing bacteria can use other compounds as electron donors in addition to Fe(II), or even perform dissimilatory Fe(III) reduction as the Geobacter metallireducens.

The dependence of photoferrotrophics on light as a crucial resource can take the bacteria to a cumbersome situation where, due to their requirement for anoxic illuminated regions (near the surface), they could be faced with competition by abiotic reactions due to the presence of molecular oxygen. To avoid this problem, they tolerate microaerophilic surface conditions or perform the photoferrotrophic Fe(II) oxidation deeper in the sediment/water column, with low light availability.

Light penetration can limit the Fe(II) oxidation in the water column. However, nitrate dependent microbial Fe(II) oxidation is a light independent metabolism that has been shown to support microbial growth in various freshwater and marine sediments (paddy soil, stream, brackish lagoon, hydrothermal, deep-sea sediments) and later on demonstrated as a pronounced metabolism within the water column at the oxygen minimum zone. Microbes that perform this metabolism are successful in neutrophilic or alkaline environments, due to the high difference between the redox potential of the couples Fe^{2+}/Fe^{3+} and NO_{3}^{−}/NO_{2}^{−} (+200 mV and +770 mV, respectively) releasing a lot of free energy when compared to other iron oxidation metabolisms.

2Fe^{2+} + NO^{−}_{3} + 5H_{2}O → 2Fe(OH)_{3} + NO^{−}_{2} + 4H^{+} (∆G°=-103.5 kJ/mol)

The microbial oxidation of ferrous iron coupled to denitrification (with nitrite or dinitrogen gas being the final product) can be autotrophic using inorganic carbon, or organic co-substrates (acetate, butyrate, pyruvate, ethanol) performing heterotrophic growth in the absence of inorganic carbon. It has been suggested that the heterotrophic nitrate-dependent ferrous iron oxidation using organic carbon might be the most favorable process. This metabolism might be very important for carrying out an important step in the biogeochemical cycle within the OMZ.

== Types ==
The microbial ferrous iron oxidation metabolic strategy (found in Archaea and Bacteria) is present in 7 phyla, being highly pronounced in the phylum Pseudomonadota (formerly Proteobacteria), particularly the Alpha, Beta, Gamma, and Zetaproteobacteria classes, and among the Archaea domain in the "Euryarchaeota" and Thermoproteota phyla, as well as in Actinomycetota, Bacillota, Chlorobiota, and Nitrospirota phyla.

There are very well-studied iron-oxidizing bacterial species such as Thiobacillus ferrooxidans, and Leptospirillum ferrooxidans, and some like Gallionella ferruginea and Mariprofundis ferrooxydans are able to produce a particular extracellular stalk-ribbon structure rich in iron, known as a typical biosignature of microbial iron oxidation. These structures can be easily detected in a sample of water, indicating the presence of iron-oxidizing bacteria. This biosignature has been a tool to understand the importance of iron metabolism in the Earth's past.

== Habitat ==
Iron-oxidizing bacteria colonize the transition zone where de-oxygenated water from an anaerobic environment flows into an aerobic environment. Groundwater containing dissolved organic material may be de-oxygenated by microorganisms feeding on that dissolved organic material. In aerobic conditions, pH variation plays an important role in driving the oxidation reaction of Fe^{2+}/Fe^{3+}. At neutrophilic pHs (hydrothermal vents, deep ocean basalts, groundwater iron seeps) the oxidation of iron by microorganisms is highly competitive with the rapid abiotic reaction occurring in <1 min. Therefore, the microbial community has to inhabit microaerophilic regions where the low oxygen concentration allows the cell to oxidize Fe(II) and produce energy to grow. However, under acidic conditions, where ferrous iron is more soluble and stable even in the presence of oxygen, only biological processes are responsible for the oxidation of iron, thus making ferrous iron oxidation the major metabolic strategy in iron-rich acidic environments.

In the marine environment, the most well-known class of iron oxidizing-bacteria is zetaproteobacteria, which are major players in marine ecosystems. Being generally microaerophilic they are adapted to live in transition zones where the oxic and anoxic waters mix. The zetaproteobacteria are present in different Fe(II)-rich habitats, found in deep ocean sites associated with hydrothermal activity and in coastal and terrestrial habitats, and have been reported in the surface of shallow sediments, beach aquifer, and surface water.

Mariprofundus ferrooxydans is one of the most common and well-studied species of zetaproteobacteria. It was first isolated from the Kamaʻehuakanaloa Seamount (formerly Loihi) vent field, near Hawaii at a depth between 1100 and 1325 meters, on the summit of this shield volcano. Vents can be found ranging from slightly above ambient (10 °C) to high temperature (167 °C). The vent waters are rich in CO_{2}, Fe(II) and Mn. Large, heavily encrusted mats with a gelatinous texture are created by iron-oxidizing bacteria as a by-product (iron-oxyhydroxide precipitation), and can be present around the vent orifices. The vents present at Kamaʻehuakanaloa seamount can be categorized into two types based on concentration and temperature of flow. Those with a focused and high-temperature flow (above 50 °C) can be expected to show higher flow rates as well. These vents are characterized by flocculent mats aggregated around the vent orifices. Mat depth at focused, high-temperature vents averages in the tens of centimeters, but can vary. In contrast, vents with cooler (10-30 °C) and diffuse flow can create mats up to one meter thick. These mats may cover hundreds of square meters of sea floor. Either type of mat can be colonized by other bacterial communities, which can change the chemical composition and the flow of the local waters.

== Impact on early life on Earth ==
Unlike most lithotrophic metabolisms, the oxidation of Fe^{2+} to Fe^{3+} yields very little energy to the cell (∆G° = 29 kJ/mol and ∆G° = -90 kJ/mol in acidic and neutral environments, respectively) compared to other chemolithotrophic metabolisms. Therefore, the cell must oxidize large amounts of Fe^{2+} to fulfill its metabolic requirements while contributing to the mineralization process (through the excretion of twisted stalks). The aerobic iron-oxidizing bacterial metabolism is thought to have made a remarkable contribution to the formation of the largest iron deposit (banded iron formation (BIF)) due to the advent of oxygen in the atmosphere 2.7 billion years ago (produced by cyanobacteria).

However, with the discovery of Fe(II) oxidation carried out under anoxic conditions in the late 1990s using light as an energy source or chemolithotrophically, using a different terminal electron acceptor (mostly NO_{3}^{−}), the suggestion arose that anoxic Fe^{2+} metabolism may pre-date aerobic Fe^{2+} oxidation and that the age of the BIF pre-dates oxygenic photosynthesis. This suggests that microbial anoxic phototrophic and anaerobic chemolithotrophic metabolism may have been present on the ancient earth, and together with Fe(III) reducers, they may have been responsible for the BIF in the Precambrian eon.

== Impact of climate change ==
In open ocean systems full of dissolved iron, iron-oxidizing bacterial metabolism is ubiquitous and influences the iron cycle. Nowadays, this biochemical cycle is undergoing modifications due to pollution and climate change; nonetheless, the normal distribution of ferrous iron in the ocean could be affected by global warming under the following conditions: acidification, shifting of ocean currents, and ocean water and groundwater hypoxia trend.

These are all consequences of the substantial increase of CO_{2} emissions into the atmosphere from anthropogenic sources. Currently the concentration of carbon dioxide in the atmosphere is around 420 ppm (120 ppm more than 20 million years ago), and about a quarter of the total CO_{2} emission enters the oceans (2.2 pg C year^{−1}). Reacting with seawater it produces bicarbonate ion (HCO_{3}^{−}) and thus the ocean acidity increases. Furthermore, the temperature of the ocean has increased by almost one degree (0.74 °C) causing the melting of big quantities of glaciers contributing to the sea-level rise. This lowers the O_{2} solubility by inhibiting the oxygen exchange between surface waters, where O_{2} is very abundant, and anoxic deep waters.

All these changes in the marine parameters (temperature, acidity, and oxygenation) impact the iron biogeochemical cycle and could have several and critical implications on ferrous iron oxidizing microbes; hypoxic and acid conditions could improve primary productivity in the superficial and coastal waters because that would increase the availability of ferrous iron Fe(II) for microbial iron oxidation. Still, at the same time, this scenario could also disrupt the cascade effect to the sediment in deep water and cause the death of benthonic animals. Moreover it is very important to consider that iron and phosphate cycles are strictly interconnected and balanced, so that a small change in the first could have substantial consequences on the second.

== Influence on water infrastructure ==
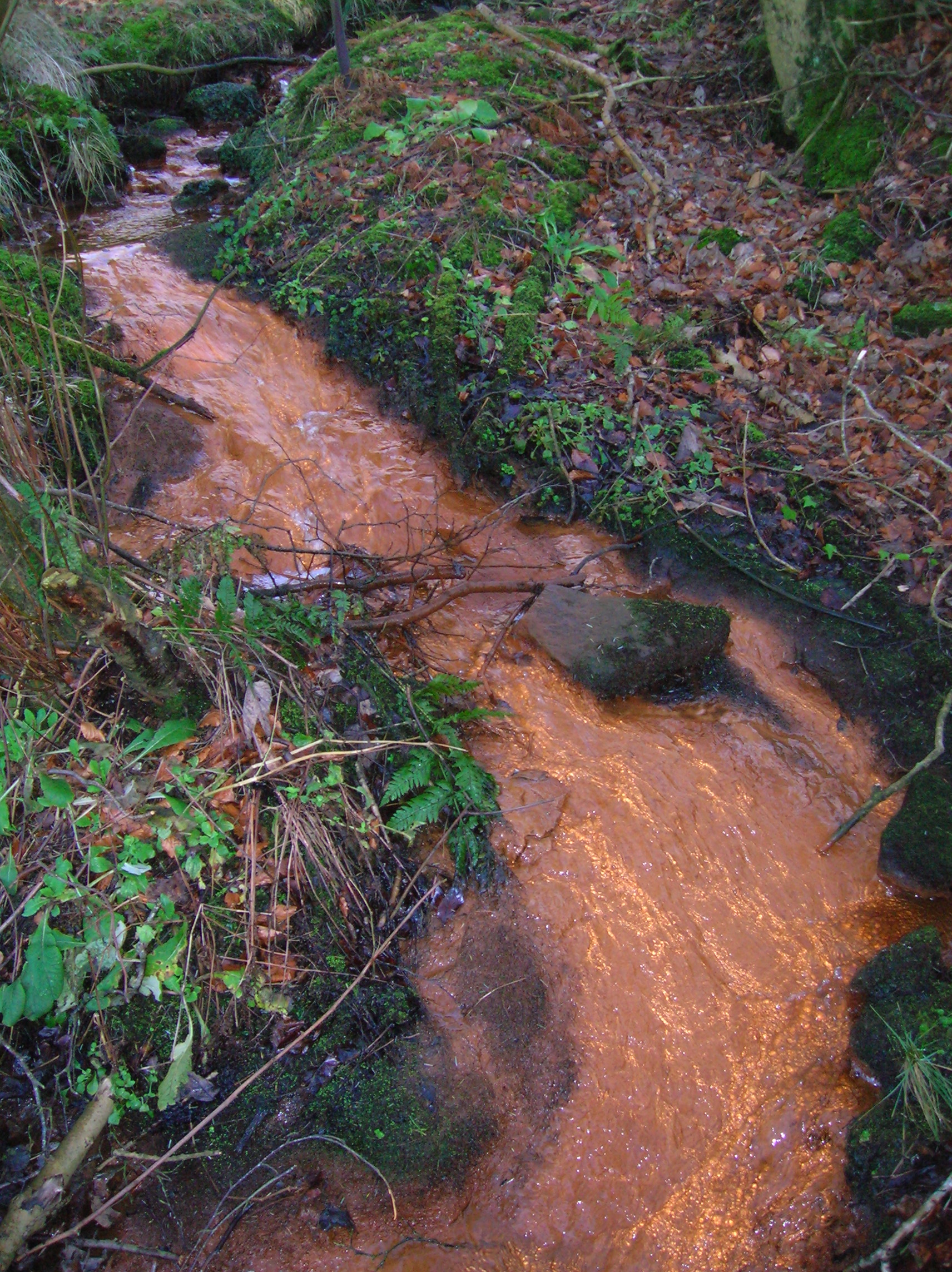
A burn in Scotland with iron-oxidizing bacteria

Iron-oxidizing bacteria can pose an issue for the management of water-supply wells, as they can produce insoluble ferric oxide, which appears as brown gelatinous slime that will stain plumbing fixtures, and clothing or utensils washed with the water carrying it.

The dramatic effects of iron bacteria are seen in surface waters as brown slimy masses on stream bottoms and lakeshores or as an oily sheen upon the water. More serious problems occur when bacteria build up in well systems. Iron bacteria in wells do not cause health problems, but they can reduce well yields by clogging screens and pipes.

Treatment techniques that may successfully remove or reduce iron bacteria include physical removal, pasteurization, and chemical treatment. Treatment of heavily infected wells may be difficult, expensive, and only partially successful. Recent application of ultrasonic devices that destroy and prevent the formation of biofilm in wells has been proven to prevent iron bacteria infection and the associated clogging very successfully.

Physical removal is typically done as a first step. Small diameter pipes are sometimes cleaned with a wire brush, while larger lines can be scrubbed and flushed clean with a sewer jetter. The pumping equipment in the well must also be removed and cleaned.

Iron filters have been used to treat iron bacteria. Iron filters are similar in appearance and size to conventional water softeners but contain beds of media that have mild oxidizing power. As the iron-bearing water is passed through the bed, any soluble ferrous iron is converted to the insoluble ferric state and then filtered from the water. Any previously precipitated iron is removed by simple mechanical filtration. Several different filter media may be used in these iron filters, including manganese greensand, Birm, MTM, multi-media, sand, and other synthetic materials. In most cases, the higher oxides of manganese produce the desired oxidizing action. Iron filters do have limitations; since the oxidizing action is relatively mild, it will not work well when organic matter, either combined with the iron or completely separate, is present in the water. As a result, the iron bacteria will not be killed. Extremely high iron concentrations may require inconvenient frequent backwashing and/or regeneration. Finally, iron filter media requires high flow rates for proper backwashing, and such water flows are not always available.

Wildfires may release iron-containing compounds from the soil into small wildland streams and cause a rapid but usually temporary proliferation of iron-oxidizing bacteria complete with orange coloration, gelatinous mats, and sulfurous odors. Higher quality personal filters may be used to remove bacteria, odor and restore water clarity.

== See also ==
- Dissimilatory metal-reducing bacteria
- Iron cycle
- Siderophilic bacteria
