= Natronobacterium =

Scientific classification
- Domain: Archaea
- Kingdom: Methanobacteriati
- Phylum: Methanobacteriota
- Class: Halobacteria
- Order: Natrialbales
- Family: Natrialbaceae
- Genus: Natronobacterium; Tindall et al. 1984 emend. Tindall 2001

Type species
- Natronobacterium gregoryi Tindall et al. 1984

Species
- N. chahanensis; N. gregoryi; "N. innermongoliae"; N. texcoconense

Synonyms
- Natronobacteria

Genus of Halobacteria

Natronobacterium is a genus of archaeans in the family the Natrialbaceae. A member of the domain Archaea, it is both an extreme halophile and alkaliphile, thriving at an optimum saline concentration of 20% and optimum pH of 10.

== Taxonomy ==
The currently accepted taxonomy is based on the List of Prokaryotic names with Standing in Nomenclature (LPSN) and National Center for Biotechnology Information (NCBI).

Proposed species:

- Natronobacterium chahanensis and Natronobacterium innemongoliae are proposed names for strains isolated from soda lakes in China. As of 2022, the descriptions from 1989 (N. chahanensis) and 1997 (N. innemongoliae) are not validly published.

Species formerly placed in this taxon.

- Natronobacterium magadii, now Natrialba magadii
- Natronobacterium nitratireducens, now Halobiforma nitratireducens
- Natronobacterium pharaonis, now Natronomonas pharaonis
- Natronobacterium vacuolatum, now Halorubrum vacuolatum

16S rRNA based LTP_07_2026

- - - Halobiforma
      - H. nitratireducens (Xin et al. 2001) Hezayen et al. 2002
      - - H. haloterrestris Hezayen et al. 2002
        - H. lacisalsi Xu et al. 2005
  - - - Natronobacterium
        - N. gregoryi Tindall et al. 1984
        - N. texcoconense Ruiz-Romero et al. 2013
    - Natronococcus

53 marker proteins based GTDB 11-RS232

- Natronobacterium
  - - N. gregoryi
    - N. texcoconense
  - - N. nitratireducens Xin et al. 2001
    - - N. haloterrestris (Hezayen et al. 2002) Dong et al. 2025
      - N. lacisalsi (Xu et al. 2005) Dong et al. 2025

== See also ==
- List of Archaea genera
