= Natrinema =

Scientific classification
- Domain: Archaea
- Kingdom: Methanobacteriati
- Phylum: Methanobacteriota
- Class: Halobacteria
- Order: Natrialbales
- Family: Natrialbaceae
- Genus: Natrinema; McGenity et al. 1998

Type species
- Natrinema pellirubrum McGenity et al. 1998

Species
- See text

Genus of Halobacteria

Natrinema (common abbreviation Nnm.) is a genus of archaeans in the family Natrialbaceae.

== Taxonomy ==
As of 2022, there are 18 species validly published in the genus Natrinema.

Natrinema is related to the genus Haloterrigena, established in 1999, resulting in confusion about taxon limits and several species apparently being assigned to the wrong genus. Based on phylogenomic analysis, eight species from Haloterrigena as well as Halopiger salifodinae were transferred to Natrinema in 2022.

=== Phylogeny ===
The currently accepted taxonomy is based on the List of Prokaryotic names with Standing in Nomenclature (LPSN) and National Center for Biotechnology Information (NCBI).

16S rRNA based LTP_07_2026

- - - Natrinema~
      - N. hispanicum
      - N. limicola
  - - - Natrinema~1
        - N. versiforme
        - - N. marinum
          - - N. thermotolerans
            - - N. mahii
              - N. saccharevitans
    - - - Natrinema s.s.
          - - N. amylolyticum
            - - N. salinisoli
              - N. salsiterrestre
          - - N. gari
            - - N. altunense
              - - N. pellirubrum
                - N. pallidum
      - - - Natrinema~2
            - N. salaciae
            - - - N. soli Rasooli et al. 2017
                - N. zhouii
              - - N. ejinorense
                - N. longum
        - - - Natrinema~3
              - N. halophilum
              - - N. caseinilyticum
                - N. gelatinilyticum
          - Natronorubrum

53 marker proteins based GTDB 11-RS232

- - - - Natronolimnohabitans
      - Haloterrigena
    - Natronorubrum
  - - Natrinema
      - N. salifodinae (Zhang et al. 2013) de la Haba et al. 2022
      - - - N. marinum Hu et al. 2023
          - - N. halophilum Bao et al. 2022
            - - N. caseinilyticum Hu et al. 2023
              - N. gelatinilyticum Hu et al. 2023
        - - - N. hispanicum (Romano et al. 2007) de la Haba et al. 2022
            - N. limicola (Cui et al. 2006) Rinke et al. 2020
          - - N. salaciae Albuquerque et al. 2012
            - - N. zhouii Hu et al. 2023
              - - - N. salinisoli Bao et al. 2022
                  - N. salsiterrestre Straková et al. 2023
                - - N. amylolyticum Bao et al. 2022
                  - - N. ejinorense Castillo et al. 2006 [incl.
                      N. longum (Cui et al. 2006) de la Haba et al. 2022]
                    - - N. versiforme Xin et al. 2000
                      - - - N. pallidum McGenity et al. 1998
                          - - N. altunense Xu et al. 2005 [incl. "N. ajinwuensis"
                              ?Mahansaria, Choudhury & Mukherjee 2015]
                            - N. gari Tapingkae et al. 2008
                        - - - N. mahii (Ding et al. 2017) de la Haba et al. 2022
                            - N. saccharevitans (Xu et al. 2005) Rinke et al. 2020
                          - - N. pellirubrum McGenity et al. 1998
                            - N. thermotolerans
                              (Montalvo-Rodrguez et al. 2000) Rinke et al. 2020

Note: Unassigned Natrinema

- "N. aidingensis" Liu et al. 2003a
- "N. thermophila" Kim et al. 2018
- "N. xinjiang" Habdin & Tohty 2005
- "N. yunnanense" [Natrinema sp. CY21]

== See also ==
- List of Archaea genera
