= Zeta-pan RNA motif =

Zeta-pan
- Consensus secondary structure and sequence conservation of Zeta-pan RNA

Identifiers
- Symbol: Zeta-pan
- Rfam: RF03111

Other data
- RNA type: Gene; sRNA
- SO: SO:0001263
- PDB structures: PDBe

The Zeta-pan RNA motif is a conserved RNA structure that was discovered by bioinformatics. Zeta-pan motif RNAs are found in Zetaproteobacteria.

Zeta-pan RNAs are consistently located upstream of "pan" operons, which contains genes involved in the synthesis of pantothenate, which is a vitamin that is a precursor of coenzyme A. This genetic arrangement is consistent with the idea that Zeta-pan RNAs function as cis-regulatory elements to regulate pantothenate synthesis.

Another RNA motif was previously discovered that also is found upstream of pan operons. This earlier pan RNA motif is, however, not found in Zetaproteobacteria. Both motifs consist of simple stem-loop secondary structures, although the earlier pan motif often consists of two stem-loops that are similar to each other. The stem-loops in the earlier pan motif usually have unpaired adenosine nucleotides in asymmetric locations on both sides of the stem-loop. The Zeta-pan motif has an unpaired adenosine only on its 5′ side. Therefore, it is possible that the two motifs are structurally related to each other, but the potential structural relationship between these motifs is not yet (as of 2018) clear.
