= Natronolimnohabitans innermongolicus =

Scientific classification
- Domain: Archaea
- Kingdom: Methanobacteriati
- Phylum: Methanobacteriota
- Class: Halobacteria
- Order: Natrialbales
- Family: Natrialbaceae
- Genus: Natronolimnohabitans
- Species: N. innermongolicus

Binomial name
- Natronolimnohabitans innermongolicus (Itoh et al. 2005) Sorokin et al. 2020

Synonyms
- Natronolimnobius innermongolicus Itoh et al. 2005

Species of bacterium

Natronolimnohabitans innermongolicus is a species of archaea in the family Natrialbaceae. It has been proposed that Haloterrigena turkmenica be reclassified as Natronolimnohabitans innermongolicus due to the genome sequence of Haloterrigena turkmenica being contaminated in a previous study.
