= Halobiforma =

Scientific classification
- Domain: Archaea
- Kingdom: Methanobacteriati
- Phylum: Methanobacteriota
- Class: Halobacteria
- Order: Natrialbales
- Family: Natrialbaceae
- Genus: Halobiforma; Hezayen et al. 2002

Type species
- Halobiforma haloterrestris Hezayen et al. 2002

Species
- H. haloterrestris; H. lacisalsi; H. nitratireducens

Synonyms
- Nalobiforma (misspelling)

Genus of archaea

Halobiforma (common abbreviation: Hbf.) is a genus of halophilic archaea of the family Natrialbaceae.

== Phylogeny ==
The currently accepted taxonomy is based on the List of Prokaryotic names with Standing in Nomenclature (LPSN) and National Center for Biotechnology Information (NCBI).

16S rRNA based LTP_07_2026

- - - Halobiforma
      - H. nitratireducens (Xin et al. 2001) Hezayen et al. 2002
      - - H. haloterrestris Hezayen et al. 2002
        - H. lacisalsi Xu et al. 2005
  - - - Natronobacterium
        - N. gregoryi
        - N. texcoconense
    - Natronococcus

53 marker proteins based GTDB 11-RS232

- Natronobacterium
  - - N. gregoryi
    - N. texcoconense
  - - N. nitratireducens Xin et al. 2001
    - - N. haloterrestris (Hezayen et al. 2002) Dong et al. 2025
      - N. lacisalsi (Xu et al. 2005) Dong et al. 2025

== See also ==
- List of Archaea genera
