= Natrinema versiforme =

Scientific classification
- Domain: Archaea
- Kingdom: Methanobacteriati
- Phylum: Methanobacteriota
- Class: Halobacteria
- Order: Natrialbales
- Family: Natrialbaceae
- Genus: Natrinema
- Species: N. versiforme

Binomial name
- Natrinema versiforme Xin et al. 2000

Species of archaeon

Natrinema versiforme is an extremely halophilic archaeon. It is neutrophilic, non-motile and pleomorphic, with type strain XF10^{T} (=JCM 10478^{T} =AS 1.2365^{T} =ANMR 0149^{T}).
