= Natronolimnohabitans =

Scientific classification
- Domain: Archaea
- Kingdom: Methanobacteriati
- Phylum: Methanobacteriota
- Class: Halobacteria
- Order: Natrialbales
- Family: Natrialbaceae
- Genus: Natronolimnohabitans; Sorokin et al. 2020

Type species
- Natronolimnohabitans innermongolicus (Itoh et al. 2005) Sorokin et al. 2020

Species
- N. innermongolicus

Genus of archaea

Natronolimnohabitans is a genus of archaeans in the family Natrialbaceae. It has also been proposed that Haloterrigena turkmenica be considered a part of these genus.

== Taxonomy ==
The type species of Natronolimnohabitans, N. innermongolicus, was originally described as one of two original members in the genus Natronolimnobius.

== See also ==
- List of Archaea genera
