= Iron cycle =

Biogeochemical cycle of Fe2+/Fe3+

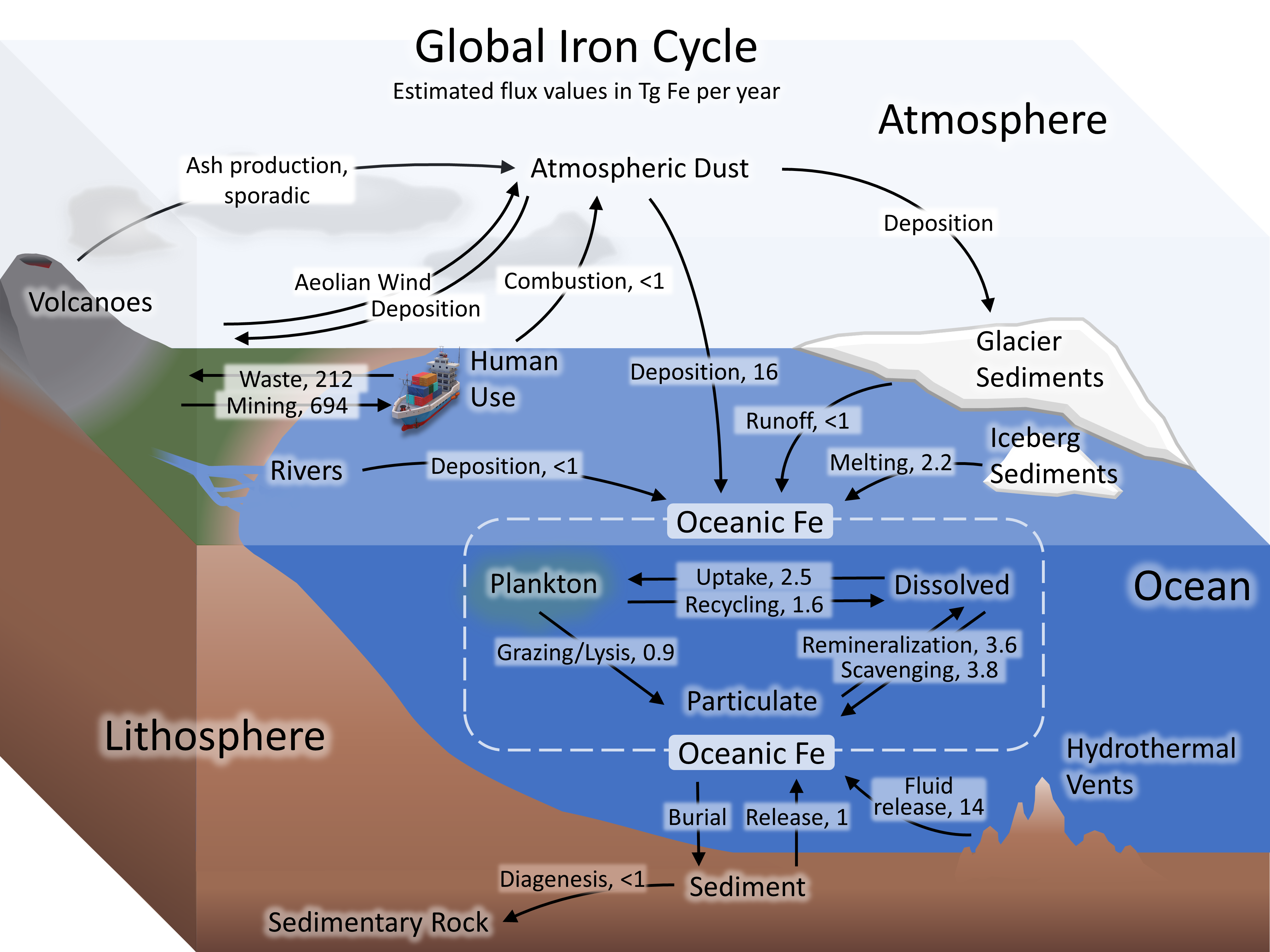
Biogeochemical iron cycle Iron circulates through the atmosphere, lithosphere, and oceans. Labeled arrows show flux in Tg (=Mt) of iron per year. Iron in the ocean cycles between plankton, aggregated particulates (non-bioavailable iron), and dissolved (bioavailable iron), and becomes sediments through burial. Hydrothermal vents release ferrous iron to the ocean in addition to oceanic iron inputs from land sources. Iron reaches the atmosphere through volcanism, aeolian activity , and some via combustion by humans. In the Anthropocene, iron is removed from mines in the crust and a portion re-deposited in waste repositories.

The iron cycle (Fe) is the biogeochemical cycle of iron through the atmosphere, hydrosphere, biosphere and lithosphere. While Fe is highly abundant in the Earth's crust, it is less common in oxygenated surface waters. Iron is a key micronutrient in primary productivity, and a limiting nutrient in the Southern ocean, eastern equatorial Pacific, and the subarctic Pacific referred to as High-Nutrient, Low-Chlorophyll (HNLC) regions of the ocean.

Iron can exist in a range of oxidation states from −2 to +7; however, on Earth it is predominantly in its +2 or +3 redox state. It is a primary redox-active metal in nature. The cycling of iron between its +2 and +3 oxidation states is referred to as the iron cycle. This process can be entirely abiotic or facilitated by microorganisms, especially iron-oxidizing bacteria. The abiotic processes include the rusting of metallic which, in addition to oxidation of the metal, involves oxidation of Fe(II) in the presence of oxygen. Another type of abiotic process is the reduction of Fe^{3+} to Fe^{2+} by sulfide minerals. The biological cycling of Fe^{2+} is mediated by iron oxidizing and reducing microbes.

Iron is an essential micronutrient for life form. It is a key component of hemoglobin, important to nitrogen fixation as part of the Nitrogenase enzyme family, and as part of the iron-sulfur core of ferredoxin it facilitates electron transport in chloroplasts, eukaryotic mitochondria, and bacteria. Due to the high reactivity of Fe^{2+} with oxygen and low solubility of Fe^{3+}, iron is a limiting nutrient in most regions of the world.

== Ancient earth ==
On the early Earth, when atmospheric oxygen levels were 0.001% of those present today, dissolved Fe^{2+} was thought to have been a lot more abundant in the oceans, and thus more bioavailable. Iron sulfide may have provided the energy and surfaces for the first organisms. Before the onset of oxygenic photosynthesis, photo-ferrotrophs could obtain energy from sunlight, and use the electrons from Fe^{2+} to fix carbon dioxide.

During the Great Oxidation Event, 2.3-2.5 billion years ago, dissolved iron was oxidized by oxygen produced by cyanobacteria to form iron oxides. The iron oxides were denser than water and fell to the ocean floor forming banded iron formations (BIF). Over time, rising oxygen levels removed increasing amounts of iron from the ocean. BIFs have been a key source of iron ore in modern times.

== Terrestrial ecosystems ==
The iron cycle is an important component of the terrestrial ecosystems. The ferrous form of iron, Fe^{2+}, is dominant in the Earth's mantle, core, or deep crust. The ferric form, Fe^{3+}, is more stable in the presence of oxygen gas. Dust is a key component in the Earth's iron cycle. Chemical and biological weathering break down iron-bearing minerals, releasing the nutrient into the atmosphere. Changes in hydrological cycle and vegetative cover impact these patterns and have a large impact on global dust production, with dust deposition estimates ranging between 1000 and 2000 Tg/year. Aeolian dust is a critical part of the iron cycle by transporting iron particulates from the Earth's land via the atmosphere to the ocean.

Illustration of volcanoes influence on the iron cycle.

Volcanic eruptions also contribute to the terrestrial iron cycle, releasing iron-rich dust into the atmosphere in either a large burst or in smaller spurts over time. However, the distribution of volcanic ash is uneven across oceans and depends on the subduction zone. At higher temperatures within a volcano's eruption plume, the interplay between volcanic ash particles and magmatic gases can determine the solubility of iron. The atmospheric transport of iron-rich dust can impact the ocean concentrations, enhancing the marine ecosystems productivity by fueling phytoplankton growth, increasing carbon uptake as well as the ocean-atmosphere CO_{2} exchange.

== Oceanic ecosystem ==
Iron availability limits the efficiency of the biological carbon pump. The largest supply of iron to the oceans is from rivers, where it is suspended as sediment particles. Coastal waters receive inputs of iron from rivers and anoxic sediments. Other major sources of iron to the ocean include glacial particulates, atmospheric dust transport, and hydrothermal vents. Iron supply is an important factor affecting growth of phytoplankton, the base of marine food web. Offshore regions rely on atmospheric dust deposition and upwelling. Other major sources of iron to the ocean include glacial particulates, hydrothermal vents, and volcanic ash. In offshore regions, bacteria also compete with phytoplankton for uptake of iron. In HNLC regions, iron limits the productivity of phytoplankton.

Most commonly, iron was available as an inorganic source to phytoplankton; however, organic forms of iron can also be used by specific diatoms which use a process of surface reductase mechanism.

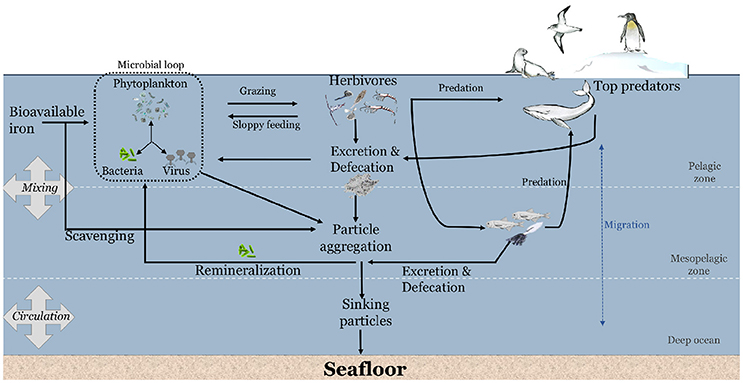
Role of marine animals in the cycling of iron in the Southern Ocean

== Role of phytoplankton in Iron cycling ==
Iron uptake by phytoplankton leads to extremely low surface seawater iron concentrations, as iron is rapidly utilized in biological processes. Inorganic iron is the most common form available to phytoplankton, but specific diatoms can also access organic iron through surface reductase mechanisms.Remineralization occurs when the sinking phytoplankton are degraded by zooplankton and bacteria. Upwelling recycles iron and causes higher deep water iron concentrations. On average there is 0.07±0.04 nmol Fe kg^{−1} at the surface (<200 m) and 0.76±0.25 nmol Fe kg^{−1} at depth (>500 m).Therefore, upwelling zones contain more iron than other areas of the surface oceans. Soluble iron in ferrous form is bioavailable for utilization which commonly comes from aeolian resources.

Iron primarily exists in particulate phases as ferric iron, and the dissolved fraction is rapidly removed from the water column by coagulation. Consequently, the dissolved iron pool has a turnover time of approximately 100 years. The availability of soluble iron from aeolian sources is particularly important for sustaining biological activity in iron-limited regions.

== Interactions with other elemental cycles ==
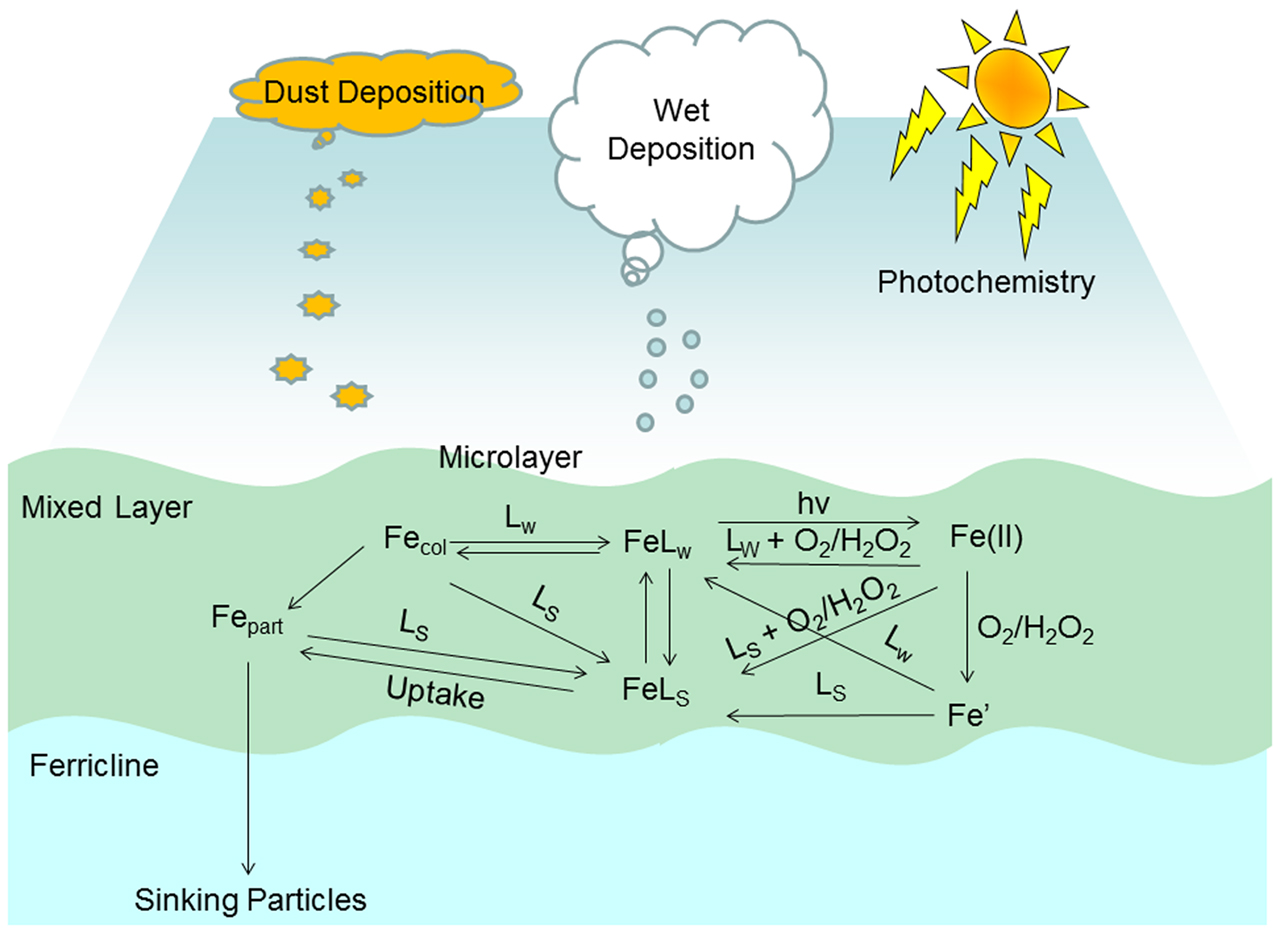
Biogeochemical cycling of dissolved iron in the surface ocean L_{S}, strong iron binding ligand; L_{W}, weak iron binding ligand; FeL_{S}, iron complexed by strong iron binding ligand; FeL_{w}, iron complexed by weak iron binding ligand; Fe(II), all sum of all Fe(II) species; Fe′, the sum of all inorganic Fe(III) species; Fe_{col}, colloidal iron species; Fe_{part}, iron in the particulate phase; hv, photon flux; O_{2}, dissolved oxygen; and H_{2}O_{2}, dissolved hydrogen peroxide.

The iron cycle interacts significantly with the sulfur, nitrogen, and phosphorus cycles. Soluble Fe(II) can act as the electron donor, reducing oxidized organic and inorganic electron receptors, including O_{2} and NO_{3}, and become oxidized to Fe(III). The oxidized form of iron can then be the electron acceptor for reduced sulfur, H_{2}, and organic carbon compounds. This returns the iron to the reduced Fe(II) state, completing the cycle.

The transition of iron between Fe(II) and Fe(III) in aquatic systems interacts with the freshwater phosphorus cycle. With oxygen in the water, Fe(II) gets oxidized to Fe(III), either abiotically or by microbes via lithotrophic oxidation. Fe(III) can form iron hydroxides, which bind tightly to phosphorus, removing it from the bioavailable phosphorus pool, limiting primary productivity. In anoxic conditions, Fe(III) can be reduced, used by microbes to be the final electron acceptor from either organic carbon or H^{2}. This releases the phosphorus back into the water for biological use.

The iron and sulfur cycle can interact at several points. Purple sulfur bacteria and green sulfur bacteria can use Fe(II) as an electron donor during anoxic photosynthesis. Sulfate reducing bacteria in anoxic environments can reduce sulfate to sulfide, which then binds to Fe(II) to create iron sulfide, a solid mineral that precipitates out of water and removes the iron and sulfur. The iron, phosphate, and sulfur cycles can all interact with each other. Sulfide can reduce Fe(III) from iron that is already bound to phosphate when there are no more metal ions available, which releases the phosphate and creates iron sulfide.

Iron plays an important role in the nitrogen cycle, aside from its role as part of the enzymes involved in nitrogen fixation. In anoxic conditions, Fe(II) can donate an electron that is accepted by NO_{3}^{−} which is oxidized to several different forms of nitrogen compounds, NO_{2}^{−}, N_{2}O, N_{2}, and NH_{4}^{+}, while Fe(II) is reduced to Fe(III).

== Bacterial influences ==
Bacteria influence the iron cycle by performing redox reactions on free iron in their environment. These reactions can take place either inside the cell by iron-oxidizing bacteria or outside the cell through extracellular electron transfer.

Iron-oxidizing bacteria play an important role in the iron cycle by converting soluble ferrous iron, Fe (II), into insoluble ferric iron, Fe (III). Iron-oxidizing bacteria can be both autotrophic and heterotrophic and are most prevalent in de-oxygenated environments because the lack of oxygen favors organisms with a different final electron acceptor. Examples of iron-oxidizing bacteria include Acidithiobacillus ferrooxidans, Gallionella ferruginea, and Rhodopseudomonas spp.. The consequences of iron-oxidizing bacteria are that there is a smaller concentration of soluble iron in the environment. This leads to less plant growth, discoloration of streams, and decreased sequestration of free phosphorus ions.

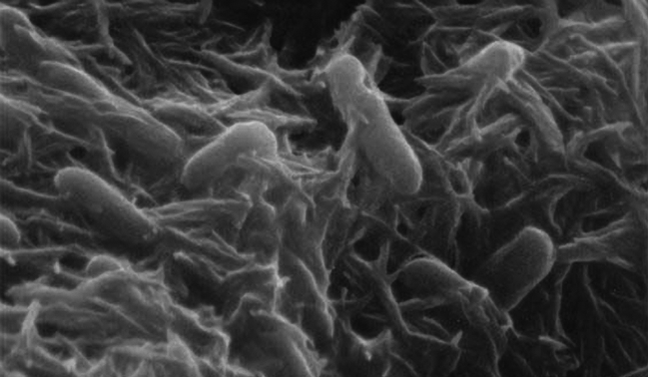
Microscopic image of Shewanella oneidensis

Another way bacteria influence the iron cycle is through extracellular electron transfer. Extracellular electron transfer occurs when a bacterium, in the absence of oxygen, utilizes metals in its environment as a final electron acceptor. This involves pumping electrons outside the cell to extracellular metals as a way to complete the electron transport chain. One popular metal to perform extracellular electron transport to is Fe (III). Examples of bacteria such as Shewanella spp., Geobacter spp., and some Enterococcus spp. use this form of metabolism. This is an important metabolic process because it reduces ferric iron to ferrous iron, which is more readily bioavailable. Thus, extracellular electron transport has similar effects on the iron cycle as iron-oxidizing bacteria. Besides the iron cycle, extracellular electron transport also impacts the environment through increased biofilm growth and increased biofilm acidity.

Taken together these two metabolic processes underscore the important role bacteria have in the iron cycle and the environment as a whole.

== Anthropogenic influences ==
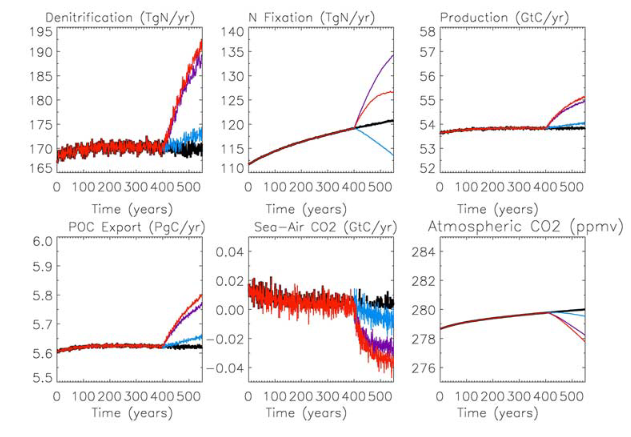
This figure shows the spatial distribution of anthropogenic iron deposition, highlighting key regions where human activities (industrial emissions, biomass burning) have significantly increased soluble iron fluxes.

Human impact on the iron cycle in the ocean is due to dust concentrations increasing at the beginning of the industrial era. Today, there is approximately double the amount of soluble iron in oceans than pre-industrial times from anthropogenic pollutants and soluble iron combustion sources. Changes in human land-use activities and climate have augmented dust fluxes which increases the amount of aeolian dust to open regions of the ocean. Other anthropogenic sources of iron are due to combustion. Highest combustion rates of iron occurs in East Asia, which contributes to 20-100% of ocean depositions around the globe.

Humans have altered the cycle for nitrogen from fossil fuel combustion and large-scale agriculture. Due to increased Iron and Nitrogen raises marine nitrogen fixation in the subtropical North and South Pacific Ocean. In the subtropics, tropics and HNLC regions, increased inputs of iron may lead to increased CO_{2} uptake, impacting the global carbon cycle.

== See also ==
- Iron fertilization
- Iron-oxidizing bacteria
