= Natronolimnobius =

Scientific classification
- Domain: Archaea
- Kingdom: Methanobacteriati
- Phylum: Methanobacteriota
- Class: Halobacteria
- Order: Natrialbales
- Family: Natrialbaceae
- Genus: Natronolimnobius; Itoh et al. 2005

Type species
- Natronolimnobius baerhuensis Itoh et al. 2005

Species
- N. baerhuensis

Genus of archaea

Natronolimnobius (common abbreviation Nln.) is a genus of archaeans in the family Natrialbaceae.

== Taxonomy ==
As of 2022, Natronolimnobius is a monotypic genus.

Species formerly placed in this taxon

- Natronolimnobius aegyptiacus, now Natrarchaeobaculum aegyptiacum
- Natronolimnobius innermongolicus, now Natronolimnohabitans innermongolicus
- Natronolimnobius sulfurireducens, now Natrarchaeobaculum sulfurireducens

== See also ==
- List of Archaea genera
