= Natrinema thermotolerans =

Scientific classification
- Domain: Archaea
- Kingdom: Methanobacteriati
- Phylum: Methanobacteriota
- Class: Halobacteria
- Order: Natrialbales
- Family: Natrialbaceae
- Genus: Natrinema
- Species: N. thermotolerans

Binomial name
- Natrinema thermotolerans (Montalvo-Rodríguez et al. 2000) de la Haba et al. 2022

Synonyms
- Haloterrigena thermotolerans Montalvo-Rodríguez et al. 2000

Species of archaeon

Natrinema thermotolerans is a species of archaea in the family Natrialbaceae.
