= Halovivax =

Scientific classification
- Domain: Archaea
- Kingdom: Methanobacteriati
- Phylum: Methanobacteriota
- Class: Halobacteria
- Order: Natrialbales
- Family: Natrialbaceae
- Genus: Halovivax; Castillo et al. 2006

Type species
- Halovivax asiaticus Castillo et al. 2006

Species
- H. asiaticus; H. cerinus; H. gelatinilyticus; H. limisalsi; H. ruber

Genus of archaea

Halovivax is a genus of archaeans in the family Natrialbaceae. Some species of Halovivax are halophiles and have been found in Iran's Aran-Bidgol hypersaline lake.

== Phylogeny ==
The currently accepted taxonomy is based on the List of Prokaryotic names with Standing in Nomenclature (LPSN) and National Center for Biotechnology Information (NCBI).

16S rRNA based LTP_07_2026

- Halovivax
  - H. gelatinilyticus
  - - H. limisalsi
    - - H. cerinus
      - - H. asiaticus
        - H. ruber

53 marker proteins based GTDB 11-RS232

- Halovivax
  - H. gelatinilyticus Li et al. 2023
  - - H. limisalsi Amoozegar et al. 2014
    - - H. cerinus Amoozegar et al. 2015
      - - H. asiaticus Castillo et al. 2006
        - H. ruber Castillo et al. 2007

== See also ==
- List of Archaea genera
