= Natrinema limicola =

Scientific classification
- Domain: Archaea
- Kingdom: Methanobacteriati
- Phylum: Methanobacteriota
- Class: Halobacteria
- Order: Natrialbales
- Family: Natrialbaceae
- Genus: Natrinema
- Species: N. limicola

Binomial name
- Natrinema limicola (Cui et al. 2006) de la Haba et al. 2022

Synonyms
- Haloterrigena limicola Cui et al. 2006

Species of archaeon

Natrinema limicola is a species of archaea in the family Natrialbaceae.
