= Natrinema hispanicum =

Scientific classification
- Domain: Archaea
- Kingdom: Methanobacteriati
- Phylum: Methanobacteriota
- Class: Halobacteria
- Order: Natrialbales
- Family: Natrialbaceae
- Genus: Natrinema
- Species: N. hispanicum

Binomial name
- Natrinema hispanicum (Romano et al. 2007) de la Haba et al. 2022

Synonyms
- Haloterrigena hispanica Romano et al. 2007

Species of archaeon

Natrinema hispanicum is a species of archaea in the family Natrialbaceae.
