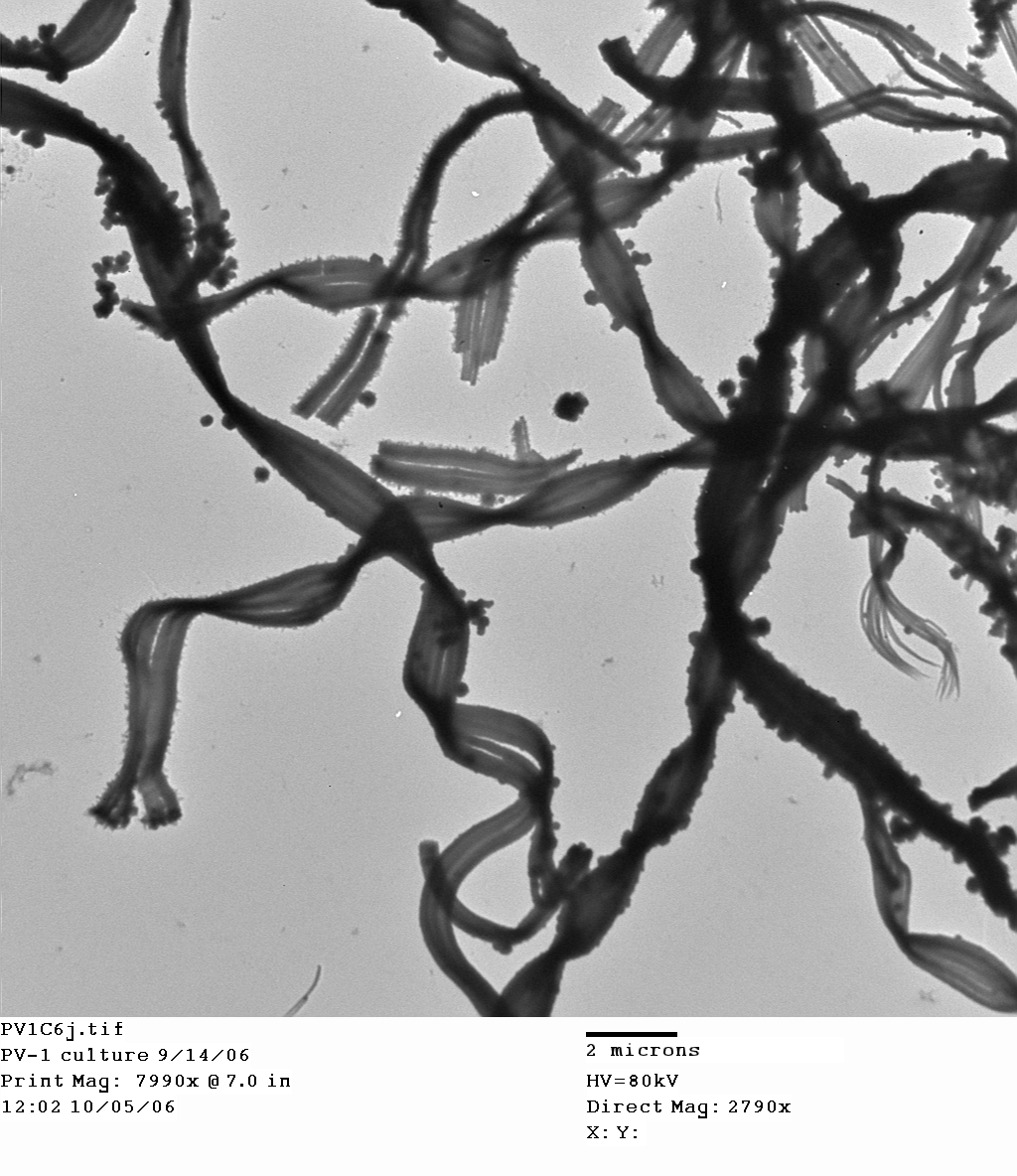

Scientific classification
- Domain: Bacteria
- Kingdom: Pseudomonadati
- Phylum: Pseudomonadota
- Class: Zetaproteobacteria
- Order: Mariprofundales; Hördt et al. 2020
- Family: Mariprofundaceae; Hördt et al. 2020
- Genus: Mariprofundus; Emerson et al. 2010
- Species: M. ferrooxydans

Binomial name
- Mariprofundus ferrooxydans Emerson et al. 2010

Synonyms
- "Mariprofundales" Makita et al. 2017; "Mariprofundales" Emerson et al. 2007

= Mariprofundus ferrooxydans =

Species of bacterium

Mariprofundus ferrooxydans is a neutrophilic, chemolithotrophic, Gram-negative bacterium which can grow by oxidising ferrous to ferric iron. It is one of the few members of the class Zetaproteobacteria in the phylum Pseudomonadota. It is typically found in iron-rich deep sea environments, particularly at hydrothermal vents. M. ferrooxydans characteristically produces stalks of solid iron oxyhydroxides that form into iron mats. Genes that have been proposed to catalyze Fe(II) oxidation in M. ferrooxydans are similar to those involved in known metal redox pathways, and thus it serves as a good candidate for a model iron oxidizing organism.

== Discovery ==
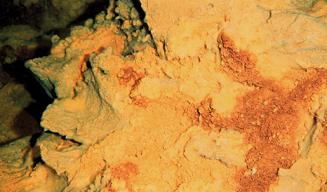
Yellow iron oxide-covered lava rock on the flank of Kamaʻehuakanaloa

The bacterium was isolated from iron-rich microbial mats associated with hydrothermal vents at a submarine volcano, Kamaʻehuakanaloa Seamount (formerly Lōʻihi), near Hawaii, and has only 85.3% 16S similarity to its nearest cultivated species Methylophaga marina. It has a doubling time at 23 °C of 12 hours and a curved rod (about 0.5×2–5 μm) morphology.

== Etymology ==
Despite being validly published, the etymology of the generic epithet is grammatically incorrect, being a concatenation of the Latin neutral mare -is (the sea) with the Latin masculine adjective profundus (deep) intended to mean a deep-sea organism (the neuter of profundus is profundum). The specific epithet is ferrum (Latin noun), iron and oxus (Greek adjective), acid or sour, and in combined words indicating oxygen. (N.L. v. oxydare, to make acid, to oxidize; N.L. part. adj. ferrooxydans, iron-oxidizing.)

== Physiology ==
M. ferrooxydans lives in microoxic conditions and uses Fe(II) as an electron donor and oxidizes it to Fe(III) as its main energy acquiring pathway, using oxygen as the electron acceptor and CO_{2} as its carbon source. It is a chemolithotroph that requires marine salts and has not been shown to grow heterotrophically. Biotic iron oxidation is in competition with abiotic iron oxidation, so M. ferrooxydans thrives in environments with high concentrations of Fe(II) but low concentrations of oxygen, where biotic oxidation of iron is able to compete with abiotic oxidation. Having high concentrations of Fe(II) in the environment is critical since iron oxidation is a low energy-yielding process, and high amounts of iron must be oxidized to yield an adequate amount of energy. The proposed model of iron oxidation in M. ferrooxydans involves oxidation of Fe(II) by an outer membrane iron oxidase, funneling the electron through an electron transport chain made up of cytochromes; oxygen is used as the terminal electron acceptor and then reverse electron transport is used to make NADH.

== Lifestyle ==
M. ferrooxydans cells are Gram-negative curved rods that cycle through two life stages: they have a free-living stage where they are motile, and a second stage where they are oxidizing iron and forming solid iron oxides. The fibrous twisted stalks of iron oxyhydroxides extruded by M. ferrooxydans are found in iron mats and are predicted to consist of an organic matrix which allows the iron oxide structure to form in a manner characteristic of M. ferrooxydans. This organism is also motile and chemotactic, which enables it to move towards appropriate concentrations of oxygen even in the heterogeneous and rapidly changing environment of hydrothermal vents; the organism can rapidly detect and respond to changing oxygen concentrations to allow aerotaxis towards appropriate levels of oxygen. Motility allows M. ferrooxydans to remain in microoxic conditions despite the amount of mixing occurring in its environment, and remain where it can out-compete abiotic iron oxidation to acquire enough energy to survive.

== Genome ==
M. ferrooxydans is capable of fixing CO_{2} using RuBisCo genes encoded in its genome; it has multiple different RuBisCo genes which suggests that the organism has adapted to fix CO_{2} across a broader spectrum of concentrations of oxygen and carbon dioxide. This organism has never been observed to grow heterotrophically, yet its genome encodes for a sugar phosphotransferase system, typically used as a carbohydrate transporter, which is specific for fructose and mannose. Carbohydrate transport is thus encoded in its genome, but it is unknown if they can be used as a carbon source or if they are used for forming the carbohydrate scaffolding matrix of the twisted stalks formed by the organism.

== Role in corrosion ==
M. ferrooxydans, along with other FeOB, have been implicated in the corrosion of Q235 steel; they are able to form a biofilm on the surface of the steel and cause pitting in the surface of the steel. The main products of Q235 steel corrosion caused by M. ferrooxydans are iron oxides such as FeOOH and Fe_{2}O_{3}, and this organism also causes acidification of the environment around the attachment site, which allows the pitting to occur.

== See also ==
- Pseudomonadota phylogeny for more on placement
