= Haloterrigena turkmenica =

Scientific classification
- Domain: Archaea
- Kingdom: Methanobacteriati
- Phylum: Methanobacteriota
- Class: Halobacteria
- Order: Natrialbales
- Family: Natrialbaceae
- Genus: Haloterrigena
- Species: H. turkmenica

Binomial name
- Haloterrigena turkmenica (Zvyagintseva and Tarasov 1989) Ventosa et al. 1999

Species of archaeon

Haloterrigena turkmenica is an aerobic chemo organotrophic archeon originally found in Turkmen salt lakes.

== Discovery ==
Haloterrigena turkmenica is a halophilic archeon that was first isolated from sulfate saline soil located in Turkmenistan. However, it wasn't until 2008 that H. turkmenica was successfully grown in the lab on Horikoshi medium.

The Horikoshi medium is composed of yeast extract, glucose, potassium phosphate (KHPO_{4}), peptone, Magnesium sulfate (MgSO_{4}), water, and sodium carbonate (NaCO_{3}).

Haloterrigena turkmenica was initially placed in the family Halobacteriaceae as Halococcus turkmenicus by Zyaginsteva and Tarasov in 1987. In 1999, Ventosa et al. published a proposal that would transfer the following species to Haloterrigena turkmenica, which is a new genera: Halococcus turkmenicus, Halobacterium trapanicum JCM 9743 and strain GSL-11. The proposal was in response to Ventosa having found significant genetic differences between H. turkmenicus and other organisms in the Halococcus genera. The proposal was accepted and the organism is now classified under this new novel genera.

== Etymology ==
The name Haloterrigena comes from the halos which mean salt and terrigena which means of or from Earth. Turkmenica was proposed by Zvyaginseva and Tarasov in 1987. This name comes from the fact that this species was first collected from the Turkish salt lakes.

== Characterization ==
Haloterrigena turkmenica is a gram-negative organism. Cells are typically found as individuals, but have been seen in the form of pairs and tetrads. Cell shape can be classified as being ovoid to coccoid in shape. The diameter of the cells ranges from 1.5 μm to 2.0 μm.

On growth medium, colonies of H. turkmenica appear elevated, red in color and circular. The red color is due to the presence of C50-carotenoids. There have been conflicting reports on the optimum growth temperature. According to Selim et al., the optimum growth temperature for H. turkmenica is 40 °C, while Saunders et al. reports that the optimum growth temperature is 51 °C. However, both reports state that the temperature growth range is between 29°-57 °C.

H. turkmenica has been documented to best grow at NaCl concentrations around 3.4M. However, it can tolerate salt concentrations from 2-4.5M NaCl. At a pH of 9, H. turkmenica has been shown to grow best. It will tolerate a pH within the range of 8.5 to 11.

Haloterrigena turkmenica is classified as an aerobic chemo-organotroph. This organism uses oxygen its preferred terminal electron acceptor and uses organic compounds for its carbon and energy source. No motility was observed. H. turkmenica tested positive for both oxidase and catalase activity. Also according to Selim et al., H. turkmenica is also able to hydrolyze tweens 80 (a branded version of polysorbate 80), casein, and cellulose. Acid is produced from glucose, mannose, fructose, sucrose, ribose and xylose fermentation. This organism has been found to use the following substrates for growth: glycerol, propionate, citrate, and sodium acetate. Nitrite reduction occurs without the production of gas. H. turkmenica has a generation time of 1.5 hours, under optimal growth conditions, making it the fastest growing member of Halobacteriaceae.

== Phylogeny and Genome ==
Haloterrigena turkmenica is in the domain of Archaea. Archaea are identified as being separate from bacteria and eukaryotes based on ribosomal RNA (rRNA) analysis and certain defining characteristics that separate the three domains of life as described by Woese in 1990.

Rapid Annotation via Subsystems Technology (RAST) is a service that annotates archaeal and bacterial genomes and provides comparison of phylogenetic relationships across a phylogenetic tree. Using RAST, Haloterrrigena turkmenica relatives were determined. Each relative was given a similarity score: higher scores equate to a closer phylogenetic similarity. The scores are based on the number of similar protein-coding genes out of a pool of 2959 protein-coding sequences. The following organisms are the 5 closest relatives to H. turkmenica (similarity scores in bold):

1. Haloterrigena borinquense DM 11551 **(515)**
2. Haroarcula marimortui ATCC 43049 **(506)**
3. Halomicrobium mukohataei DSM 12286 **(501)**
4. Halorhabdus utahensis DS 12940 **(497)**
5. Halquadratum walsbyi DSM 1679 **(488)**

In 2016, Selim et al. used a Roche DNA sequencer (GS De Novo Assembler V.2.9) to determine the GC (Guanine - Cytosine) content of H. turkmenica's genome. The GC content of H. turkmenica was determined to be 64% for its draft genome with 49 RNA genes predicted using RAST. The protein coding sequences were also digested using RAST. This revealed 193 subsystems including several enzymes encoding genes for carboxylase, cellulase and xylanase enzymes, xylose isomerase, and carboxylesterase. Other genes coding for biosynthesis of peptides and secondary metabolites were also detected.

== Importance ==
Historically the phylogeny of the genera of Haloterrigena has been difficult to classify. Further investigation could help to solidify the phylogeny of this archeon; solidification of the relationships among the members of Haloterrigena and Natrinema will help us to flesh out the Archaeal portion of the tree of life. Investigation of Archaea's extremophile tendencies could lead to insight into novel technologies (such as DNA preservation) and may also provide insight into the biota of early Earth. Methanogenesis is only performed by members of Archea and thus it is important to discover as much as we can about this domain. Haloterrigena turkmenica is a good candidate for research because it has the fastest known generation time within Halobacteriaceae and it can be grown on media.
