= Halobiforma haloterrestris =

Scientific classification
- Domain: Archaea
- Kingdom: Methanobacteriati
- Phylum: Methanobacteriota
- Class: Halobacteria
- Order: Natrialbales
- Family: Natrialbaceae
- Genus: Halobiforma
- Species: H. haloterrestris

Binomial name
- Halobiforma haloterrestris Hezayen et al. 2002

Type strain
- 135 (= DSM 13078 = JCM 11627)

Species of archaeon

Halobiforma haloterrestris is an extremely halophilic member of the Halobacteria and the type species of the genus Halobiforma. H. haloterrestris is aerobic and motile. The cells are red-pigmented, neutrophilic and show rod, coccus and slightly pleomorphic morphology.
