= Natrinema saccharevitans =

Scientific classification
- Domain: Archaea
- Kingdom: Methanobacteriati
- Phylum: Methanobacteriota
- Class: Halobacteria
- Order: Natrialbales
- Family: Natrialbaceae
- Genus: Natrinema
- Species: N. saccharevitans

Binomial name
- Natrinema saccharevitans (Xu et al. 2005) de la Haba et al. 2022

Synonyms
- Haloterrigena saccharevitans Xu et al. 2005

Species of archaeon

Natrinema saccharevitans is a species of archaea in the family Natrialbaceae.
