= Halostagnicola =

Scientific classification
- Domain: Archaea
- Kingdom: Methanobacteriati
- Phylum: Methanobacteriota
- Class: Halobacteria
- Order: Natrialbales
- Family: Natrialbaceae
- Genus: Halostagnicola; Castillo et al. 2006

Type species
- Halostagnicola larsenii Castillo et al. 2006

Species
- H. alkaliphila; H. bangensis; H. kamekurae; H. larsenii

Genus of archaea

Halostagnicola is a genus of archaeans in the family Natrialbaceae.

== Phylogeny ==
The currently accepted taxonomy is based on the List of Prokaryotic names with Standing in Nomenclature (LPSN) and National Center for Biotechnology Information (NCBI).

16S rRNA based LTP_07_2026

- Halostagnicola
  - - H. alkaliphila Nagaoka et al. 2011
    - H. bangensis Corral et al. 2015
  - - H. kamekurae Nagaoka et al. 2010
    - H. larsenii Castillo et al. 2006

53 marker proteins based GTDB 11-RS232

- Halostagnicola
  - H. kamekurae
  - H. larsenii

== See also ==
- List of Archaea genera
