= Zetaproteobacteria =

Scientific classification (Candidatus)
- Domain: Bacteria
- Phylum: Pseudomonadota
- Class: Zetaproteobacteria Makita et al. 2017
- Order: Mariprofundales Makita et al. 2017
- Family: Mariprofundaceae Hördt et al. 2020

Genera
- Ghiorsea Mori et al. 2017; Mariprofundus Emerson et al. 2010

Synonyms
- "Mariprofundia" Cavalier-Smith 2020

Class of bacteria

The class Zetaproteobacteria is the sixth and most recently described class of the Pseudomonadota. Zetaproteobacteria can also refer to the group of organisms assigned to this class. The Zetaproteobacteria were originally represented by a single described species, Mariprofundus ferrooxydans, which is an iron-oxidizing neutrophilic chemolithoautotroph originally isolated from Kamaʻehuakanaloa Seamount (formerly Loihi) in 1996 (post-eruption). Molecular cloning techniques focusing on the small subunit ribosomal RNA gene have also been used to identify a more diverse majority of the Zetaproteobacteria that have as yet been unculturable.

Regardless of culturing status, the Zetaproteobacteria show up worldwide in estuarine and marine habitats associated with opposing steep redox gradients of reduced (ferrous) iron and oxygen, either as a minor detectable component or as the dominant member of the microbial community. Zetaproteobacteria have been most commonly found at deep-sea hydrothermal vents, though recent discovery of members of this class in near-shore environments has led to the reevaluation of Zetaproteobacteria distribution and significance.

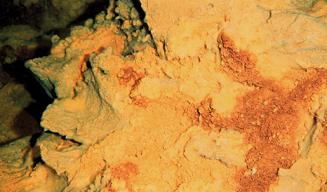
Microbial mats encrusted with iron oxide on the flank of Kamaʻehuakanaloa Seamount, Hawaii. Microbial communities in this type of habitat can harbor microbial communities dominated by the iron-oxidizing Zetaproteobacteria.

== Significance ==
The Zetaproteobacteria are distributed worldwide in deep sea and near shore environments at oxic/anoxic interfaces. With this wide distribution, the Zetaproteobacteria have the potential to play a substantial role in biogeochemical cycling, both past and present. Ecologically, the Zetaproteobacteria play a major role in the engineering of their own environment through the use of the controlled deposition of mineralized iron oxides, also directly affecting the environment of other members of the microbial community.

Prevalence of the Zetaproteobacteria in near-shore metal (e.g. steel) coupon biocorrosion experiments highlights the impact of these marine iron oxidizers on expensive problems such as the rusting of ship hulls, metal pilings and pipelines.

== Discovery ==
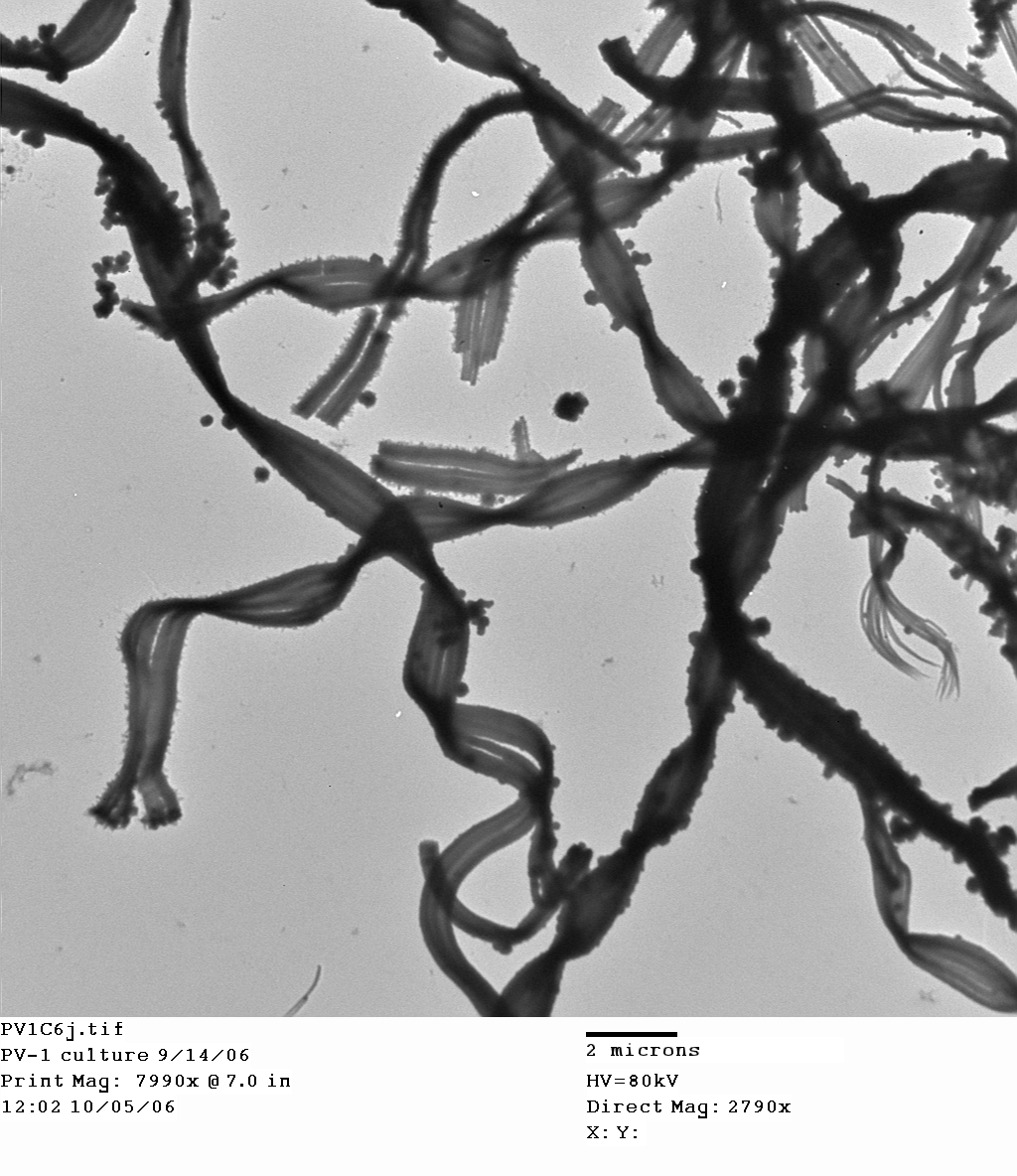
Mariprofundus ferrooxydans PV-1 twisted stalks TEM image. One example of Fe oxide morphotypes produced by the Zetaproteobacteria. Image by Clara Chan

The Zetaproteobacteria were first discovered in 1991 by Craig Moyer, Fred Dobbs and David Karl as a single rare clone in a mesophilic, or moderate temperature, hydrothermal vent field known as Pele's Vents at Kamaʻehuakanaloa Seamount (formerly Loihi), Hawaii. This particular vent was dominated by sulfur-oxidizing Campylobacterota. With no close relatives known at the time, the clone was initially labeled as Gammaproteobacteria.

Subsequent isolation of two strains of M. ferrooxydans, PV-1 and JV-1, along with the increasing realization that a phylogenetically distinct group of Pseudomonadota (the Zetaproteobacteria) could be found globally as dominant members of bacterial communities led to the suggestion for the creation of this new class of the Pseudomonadota.

== Cultivation ==
Neutrophilic microaerophilic Fe-oxidizing bacteria are typically cultivated using an agarose-stabilized or liquid culture with an FeS or FeCO_{3} plug. The headspace of the culture tube is then purged with air or a low concentration of oxygen (often 1% or less O_{2}). Fe-oxidizers have also successfully been cultivated in liquid culture with FeCl_{2} as the Fe source. These cultivation techniques follow those found in Emerson and Floyd (2005).

Recently, researchers have been able to culture the Zetaproteobacteria using graphite electrodes at a fixed voltage. Researchers have also aimed to improve cultivation techniques using a high-biomass batch culturing technique.

== Morphology ==
One of the most distinctive ways of identifying circumneutral iron oxidizing bacteria visually is by identifying the structure of the mineralized iron oxyhydroxide product created during iron oxidation. Oxidized, or ferric, iron is insoluble at circumneutral pH, thus the microbe must have a way of dealing with the mineralized "waste" product. It is thought that one method to accomplish this is to control the deposition of oxidized iron. Some of the most common morphotypes include: amorphous particulate oxides, twisted or helical stalks (figure), sheaths, and y-shaped irregular filaments.

These morphologies exist both in freshwater and marine iron habitats, though common freshwater iron-oxidizing bacteria such as Gallionella sp. (twisted stalk) and Leptothrix ochracea (sheath) have only extremely rarely been found in the deep sea (not significant abundance). One currently published morphotype that has been partially resolved is the twisted stalk, which is commonly formed by M. ferrooxydans. This bacteria is a gram-negative kidney-bean-shaped cell that deposits iron oxides on the concave side of the cell, forming twisted stalks as it moves through its environment.

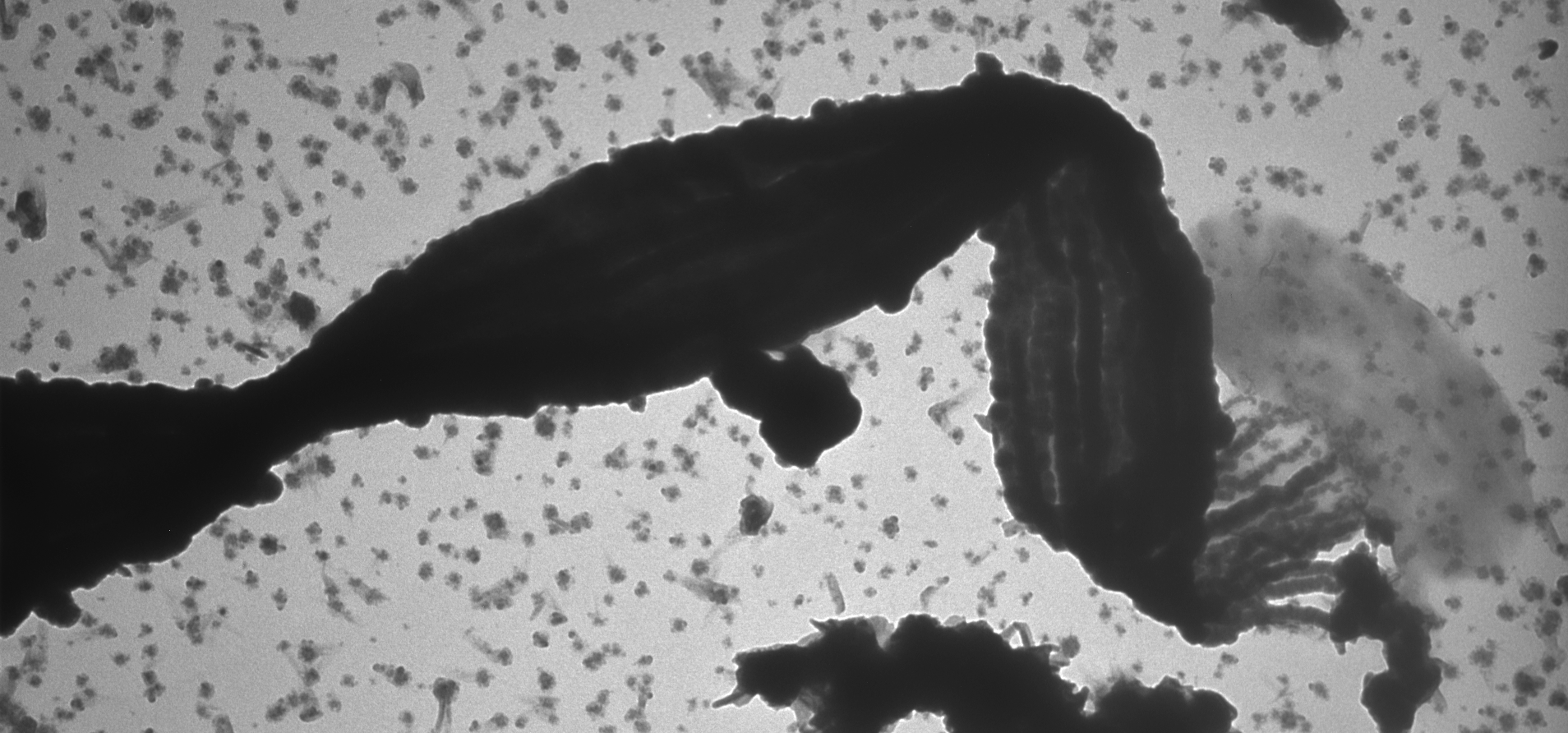
Mariprofundus ferrooxydans PV-1 cell attached to twisted stalk TEM image. Image by Clara Chan.

Another common Zetaproteobacteria morphotype is the sheath structure, which has yet to be isolated, but has been identified with fluorescence in situ hybridization (FISH).

Iron oxidation morphotypes can be preserved and have been detected in ancient hydrothermal deposits preserved in the rock record. Some current work is focused on how the Zetaproteobacteria form their individual biominerals in the modern environment so that scientists can better interpret Fe biominerals found in the rock record.

== Ecology ==
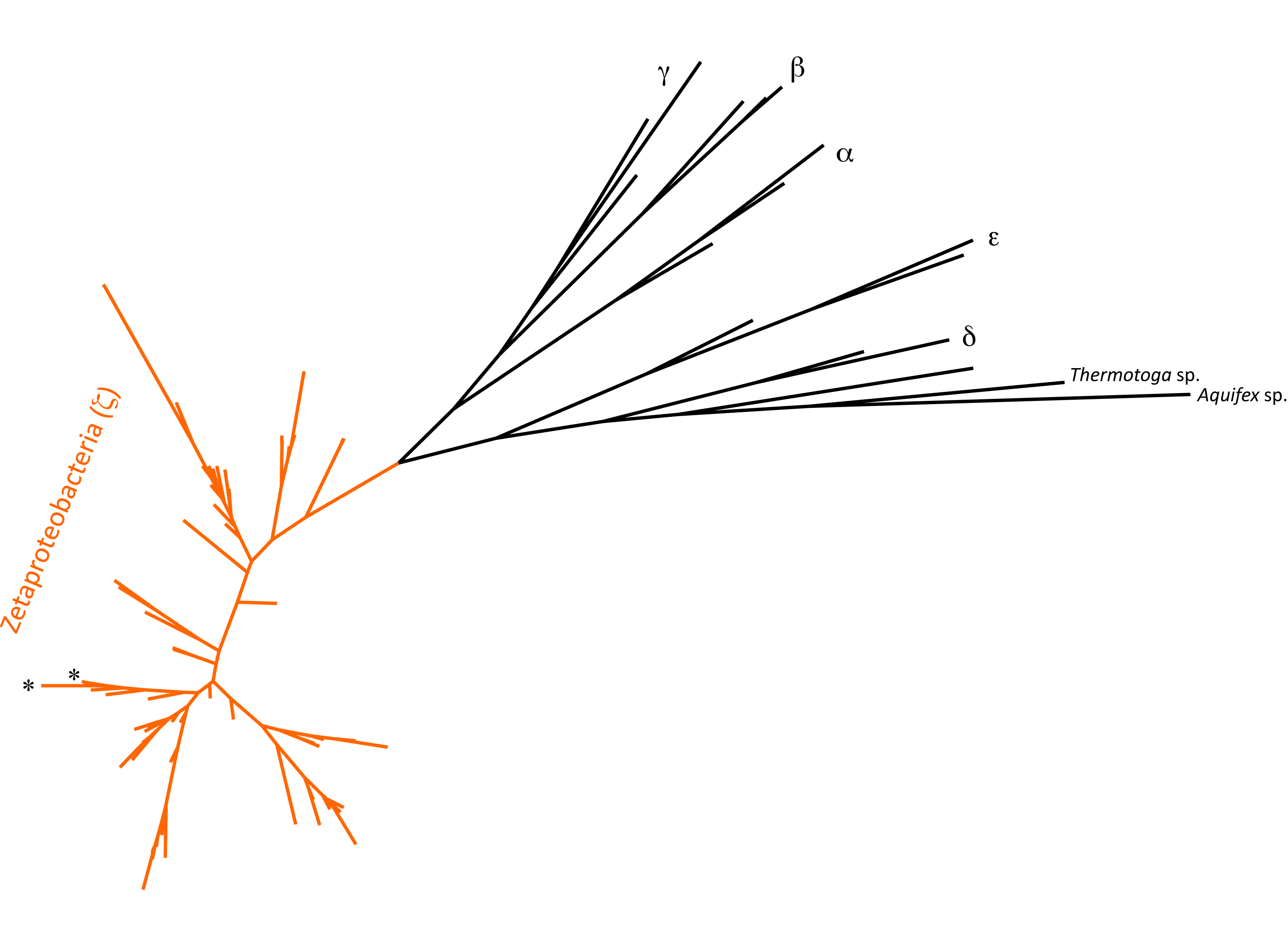
Phylogenetic tree showing the phylogenetic placement of the Zetaproteobacteria (orange branches) within the Pseudomonadota. Asterisks highlight the Zetaproteobacteria cultured isolates.

=== Biodiversity ===
An operational taxonomic unit, or an OTU, allows a microbiologist to define a bacterial taxa using defined similarity bins based on a gene of interest. In microbial ecology, the small subunit ribosomal RNA gene is generally used at a cut off of 97% similarity to define an OTU. In the most basic sense, the OTU represents a bacterial species.

For the Zetaproteobacteria, 28 OTUs have been defined. Of interest were the two globally distributed OTUs that dominated the phylogenetic tree, two OTUs that seemed to originate in the deep subsurface, and several endemic OTUs, along with the relatively limited detection of the isolated Zetaproteobacteria representative.

=== Classification ===
Zetaproteobacteria OTUs can now be classified according to the naming scheme used in McAllister et al. (2011). The program ZetaHunter uses closed reference binning to identify sequences closely related to the established OTUs in addition to identifying novel Zetaproteobacteria OTUs. ZetaHunter's feature list continues to grow, but includes: 1) stable OTU binning, 2) sample comparison, 3) database and mask management options, 4) multi-threaded processing, 5) chimera checking, 6) checks for non-database-related sequences, and 7) OTU network maps. The ZetaHunter software can be downloaded at: https://github.com/mooreryan/ZetaHunter

Phylogeny of Mariprofundaceae by GTDB 07-RS207

- Mariprofundaceae
  - Ghiorsea bivora Mori et al. 2017
  - Mariprofundus
    - - "M. erugo" Garrison et al. 2019
      - M. ferrooxydans Emerson et al. 2010
    - - "M. micogutta" Makita et al. 2017
      - - "M. aestuarium" Chiu et al. 2017
        - "M. ferrinatatus" Chiu et al. 2017

=== Habitats ===
- Deep-sea hydrothermal vents associated with:
  - hotspots
  - back-arc spreading centers/troughs
  - Island arcs
    - Near-shore venting associated with a coral reef ecosystem
  - Spreading centers (on- and off axis)
  - Inactive sulfides along the East Pacific Rise (spreading center)
  - Flooded caldera
  - Guaymas Basin
  - Massive sulfide deposits
- Altered deep-sea basalts
- Levantine Basin and continental margin
- Antarctica continental shelf sediment
- Brine/seawater interface
- Stratified Chesapeake Bay estuary
- Intertidal mixing zone of a beach aquifer
- Salt marsh sediment
- Oxygenated worm burrows or bioturbated beach sands
- Near-shore metal biocorrosion experiments
- Tsunami impacted soils
- Mangrove soils
- Deep subsurface CO_{2}-rich springs
- Subsurface flow reactor in the Äspö Hard Rock Laboratory
- Rimicaris exoculata (shrimp) gut at the MAR

=== Ecological Niche ===
All of the habitats where Zetaproteobacteria have been found have (at least) two things in common: 1) they all provide an interface of steep redox gradients of oxygen and iron. & 2) they are marine or brackish.

Reduced hydrothermal fluids, for instance, exiting from vents in the deep-sea carry with them high concentrations of ferrous iron and other reduced chemical species, creating a gradient upward through a microbial mat of high- to low-ferrous iron. Similarly, oxygen from the overlying seawater diffuses into the microbial mat resulting in a downward gradient of high to low oxygen. Zetaproteobacteria are thought to live at the interface, where there is enough oxygen for use as an electron acceptor without there being too much oxygen for the organism to compete with the increased rate of chemical oxidation, and where there is enough ferrous iron for growth.

Iron oxidation is not always energetically favorable. Reference discusses favorable conditions for iron oxidation in habitats that otherwise may have been thought to be dominated by the more energy yielding metabolisms of hydrogen or sulfur oxidation.

Note: Iron is not the only reduced chemical species associated with these redox gradient environments. It is likely that Zetaproteobacteria are not all iron oxidizers.

== Metabolism ==
Iron oxidation pathways in both acidophilic and circumneutral freshwater iron oxidation habitats, such as acid mine drainage or groundwater iron seeps, respectively, are better understood than marine circumneutral iron oxidation.

In recent years, researchers have made progress in suggesting possibilities for how the Zetaproteobacteria oxidize iron, primarily through comparative genomics. With this technique, genomes from organisms with similar function, for example the freshwater Fe-oxidizing Betaproteobacteria and the marine Fe-oxidizing Zetaproteobacteria, are compared to find genes that may be required for this function. Identifying the iron oxidation pathway in the Zetaproteobacteria began with the publication of the first described cultured representative, M. ferrooxydans strain PV-1. In this genome, the gene neighborhood of a molybdopterin oxidoreductase protein was identified as a place to start looking at candidate iron oxidation pathway genes. In a follow-up analysis of a metagenomic sample, Singer et al. (2013) concluded that this molybdopterin oxidoreductase gene cassette was likely involved in Fe oxidation. Comparative analysis of several single cell genomes, however, suggested an alternative conserved gene cassette with several cytochrome c and cytochrome oxidase genes to be involved in Fe oxidation. For further reading on Fe oxidation pathways see reference.

The phylogenetic distance between the Zetaproteobacteria and the Fe-oxidizing freshwater Betaproteobacteria suggests that Fe oxidation and the produced biominerals are the result of convergent evolution. Comparative genomics has been able to identify several genes that are shared between the two clades, however, suggesting that the trait of Fe oxidation could have been horizontally transferred, possibly virally mediated.

Fe mats associated with the Zetaproteobacteria, in addition to oxidizing Fe have been found to have the genetic potential for denitrification, arsenic detoxification, Calvin-Benson-Bassham (CBB) cycle, and reductive tricarboxylic acid (rTCA) cycles. Novel primers have been designed to detect these genes in environmental samples.

It is difficult at this point to speculate on the metabolism of the entire class of Zetaproteobacteria (with at least 28 different OTUs/species) with the limited sample size.

== Suggested reviews ==
- Emerson et al., 2010. Iron-oxidizing bacteria: an environmental and genomic perspective.
- Hedrich et al., 2011. The iron-oxidizing proteobacteria.
- Ilbert and Bonnefoy, 2013. Insights into the evolution of the iron oxidation pathways.
- Kato, 2015. Ecophysiology of neutrophilic iron-oxidizing microorganisms and its significance in global biogeochemical cycling.
- Ishibashi et al. eds, 2015. Subseafloor Biosphere Linked to Hydrothermal Systems.
- Melton et al., 2014. The interplay of microbially-mediated and abiotic reactions in the biogeochemical Fe cycle.

== See also ==
- Mariprofundus ferrooxydans
- Microbial ecology
- Pseudomonadota taxonomy
- Bacterial phyla
