= Halopiger =

Scientific classification
- Domain: Archaea
- Kingdom: Methanobacteriati
- Phylum: Methanobacteriota
- Class: Halobacteria
- Order: Natrialbales
- Family: Natrialbaceae
- Genus: Halopiger; Gutiérrez et al., 2007

Type species
- Halopiger xanaduensis Gutérrez et al. 2007

Species
- H. aswanensis; H. djelfimassiliensis; H. goleimassiliensis; H. thermotolerans; H. xanaduensis

Genus of archaea

Halopiger is a genus of archaeans in the family Natrialbaceae that have high tolerance to salinity.

== Phylogeny ==
The currently accepted taxonomy is based on the List of Prokaryotic names with Standing in Nomenclature (LPSN) and National Center for Biotechnology Information (NCBI).

16S rRNA based LTP_07_2026

- Halopiger
  - H. djelfimassiliensis Hassani et al. 2016
  - - H. salifodinae Zhang et al. 2013
    - - H. goleimassiliensis Hassani et al. 2016
      - - H. xanaduensis Gutierrez et al. 2007
        - - H. aswanensis Hezayen et al. 2010
          - H. thermotolerans Minegishi et al. 2016

53 marker proteins based GTDB 11-RS232

- Halopiger_B
  Halopiger djelfimassiliensis

- Halopiger_A
  Halopiger goleimassiliensis

- Halopiger
  - H. aswanensis
  - H. xanaduensis

Species formerly placed in this taxon

- Halopiger salifodinae, now Natrinema salifodinae

== See also ==
- List of Archaea genera
