= Pan RNA motif =

pan RNA motif
- Consensus secondary structure of pan RNAs

Identifiers
- Symbol: pan
- Rfam: RF01749

Other data
- RNA type: Cis-regulatory element
- Domain(s): Chloroflexota, Bacillota, Pseudomonadota
- PDB structures: PDBe

The pan RNA motif defines a conserved RNA structure that was identified using bioinformatics. pan motif RNAs are present in three phyla: Chloroflexota, Bacillota, and Pseudomonadota, although within the latter phylum they are only known in deltaproteobacteria. A pan RNA is present in the Firmicute Bacillus subtilis, which is one of the most extensively studied bacteria.

pan RNAs appear to be located in the 5' untranslated regions of genes that encode enzymes involved in the synthesis of the vitamine pantothenate. Thus it was proposed that the pan RNA motif represents a cis-regulatory element acting at the RNA level to regulate pantothenate synthesis. The primary structural feature of pan RNAs is that they have one or two stem-loops that have two bulged adenosines. Their relatively simple structure and lack of numerous conserved nucleotides is less typical of a riboswitch, and they were proposed to bind a protein.

The pan RNA motif is not to be confused with PAN RNA, a polyadenylated nuclear long non-coding RNA expressed by Kaposi's sarcoma-associated herpesvirus (KSHV) that facilitates lytic infection and modulates the host immune response. Whereas the pan RNA motif is a conserved bacterial cis-regulatory element associated with pantothenate synthesis, PAN RNA is a viral lncRNA that interacts with proteins and nucleic acids during KSHV infection.
