= Natrialba =

Scientific classification
- Domain: Archaea
- Kingdom: Methanobacteriati
- Phylum: Methanobacteriota
- Class: Halobacteria
- Order: Natrialbales
- Family: Natrialbaceae
- Genus: Natrialba; Kamekura and Dyall-Smith 1996

Type species
- Natrialba asiatica Kamekura & Dyall-Smith 1996

Species
- N. aegyptia; "N. aibiense"; N. asiatica; N. chahannaoensis; N. hulunbeirensis; N. magadii; N. swarupiae; N. taiwanensis; "N. wudunaoensis"

Genus of archaea

Natrialba is a genus of archaeans in the family Natrialbaceae. The genus consists of many diverse species that can survive extreme environmental niches, especially they are capable to live in the waters saturated or nearly saturated with salt (halophiles). They have certain adaptations to live within their salty environments. For example, their cellular machinery is adapted to high salt concentrations by having charged amino acids on their surfaces, allowing the cell to keep its water molecules around these components. The osmotic pressure and these amino acids help to control the amount of salt within the cell.

For instance, N. magadii is an aerobic chemoorganotrophic, dual extremophile requiring alkaline conditions and hypersalinity for optimal growth. Those harsh conditions resulted in changed composition of charged amino acids in the proteins (average isoelectric point is only 4.64, whereas other organisms average is 6.5) with almost all proteins being highly acidic. The genome of N. magadii consists of four replicons with a total sequence of 4,443,643 bp and encodes 4,212 putative proteins. The genome analysis identified multiple genes coding putative proteins involved in adaptation to hypersalinity, stress response, glycosylation, and polysaccharide biosynthesis. Additionally, proton-driven ATP synthase and a variety of putative cytochromes and other proteins required for aerobic respiration and electron transfer had been found. The genome encodes a number of putative proteases/peptidases.

Their resistance to salt allows for the use of some members of the genus in biotechnological processes.

== Phylogeny ==
The currently accepted taxonomy is based on the List of Prokaryotic names with Standing in Nomenclature (LPSN) and National Center for Biotechnology Information (NCBI).

16S rRNA based LTP_07_2026

- - - - Natrarchaeobius versutus
      - Natrialba swarupiae Kajale et al. 2020
    - - Natrarchaeobius
      - - Natrialba
          - - N. asiatica Kamekura & Dyall-Smith 1996
            - - N. aegyptia corrig. Hezayen et al. 2001
              - N. taiwanensis Hezayen et al. 2001
          - - N. chahannaoensis Xu et al. 2001
            - - N. hulunbeirensis Xu et al. 2001
              - N. magadii (Tindall et al. 1984) Kamekura et al. 1997

53 marker proteins based GTDB 11-RS232

- Natrialba
  - - N. asiatica
    - - N. aegyptia
      - N. taiwanensis
  - - N. magadii
    - - N. chahannaoensis ["Natronobacterium chahannaoensis" Wang & Tang 1989]
      - N. hulunbeirensis ["Natronobacterium chagannuoerensis" Wang & Tang 1989]

== See also ==
- List of Archaea genera
