= Natronococcus =

Scientific classification
- Domain: Archaea
- Kingdom: Methanobacteriati
- Phylum: Methanobacteriota
- Class: Halobacteria
- Order: Natrialbales
- Family: Natrialbaceae
- Genus: Natronococcus; Tindall et al. 1984

Type species
- Natronococcus occultus Tindall et al. 1984

Species
- See text

Genus of archaea

Natronococcus is a genus of archaeans in the family the Natrialbaceae.

== Description and significance ==
This haloalkaliphilic archaeon is in the same family as microorganisms like Halobacterium. Study of Natronococcus continues to explore what enzymes are present in order to survive in these conditions, especially since there has not been much literature about enzymes of haloalkaliphiles.

== Genome structure ==
The G + C content for the major chromosome is 64.0% while the minor component has a 55.7% content. The approximate size of the plasmid is 144 kbp.

== Cell structure and metabolism ==
Natronococcus is a heterotrophic, aerobic organism that can use sugars as an energy source to stimulate growth. It can fix nitrogen from casamino acids and reduces nitrates to nitrites.

Cells are non-motile and occur in irregular clusters, pairs, and single cells. The cell is coccoid in shape and 1–2 micrometres in diameter. colonies are pale brown and circular.

== Ecology ==
N. occultus has been isolated from the soda lake Lake Magadi. This halophilic archaeon is partial to environments with 8–30% NaCl with optimum growth at 22%. It also grows in a pH range of 8.5–11 (optimum at 9.5) and a temperature range of 20–50 °C (optimum at 40 °C).

== Phylogeny ==
The currently accepted taxonomy is based on the List of Prokaryotic names with Standing in Nomenclature (LPSN) and National Center for Biotechnology Information (NCBI).

16S rRNA based LTP_07_2026

- Natronococcus
  - - N. jeotgali
    - N. occultus
  - - N. amylolyticus
    - - N. wangiae
      - N. zhouii

53 marker proteins based GTDB 11-RS232

- Natronococcus
  - N. wangiae Dong et al. 2025
  - - - "N. pandeyae" Kajale et al. 2022
      - N. zhouii Dong et al. 2025
    - - - N. amylolyticus Kanai et al. 1995
        - N. roseus Corral et al. 2013
      - - N. jeotgali Roh et al. 2007
        - N. occultus Tindall et al. 1984

Unassigned species:

- "N. aibiensis" Xu & Wu 2003
- "N. xinjiangense" Liu & Dilbar 2000
- "N. yunnanense" Tian & Li 2006
- "N. zabuyensis" Liu et al. 2003b

== See also ==
- List of Archaea genera
