= Neutrophile =

Neutrophilic organism

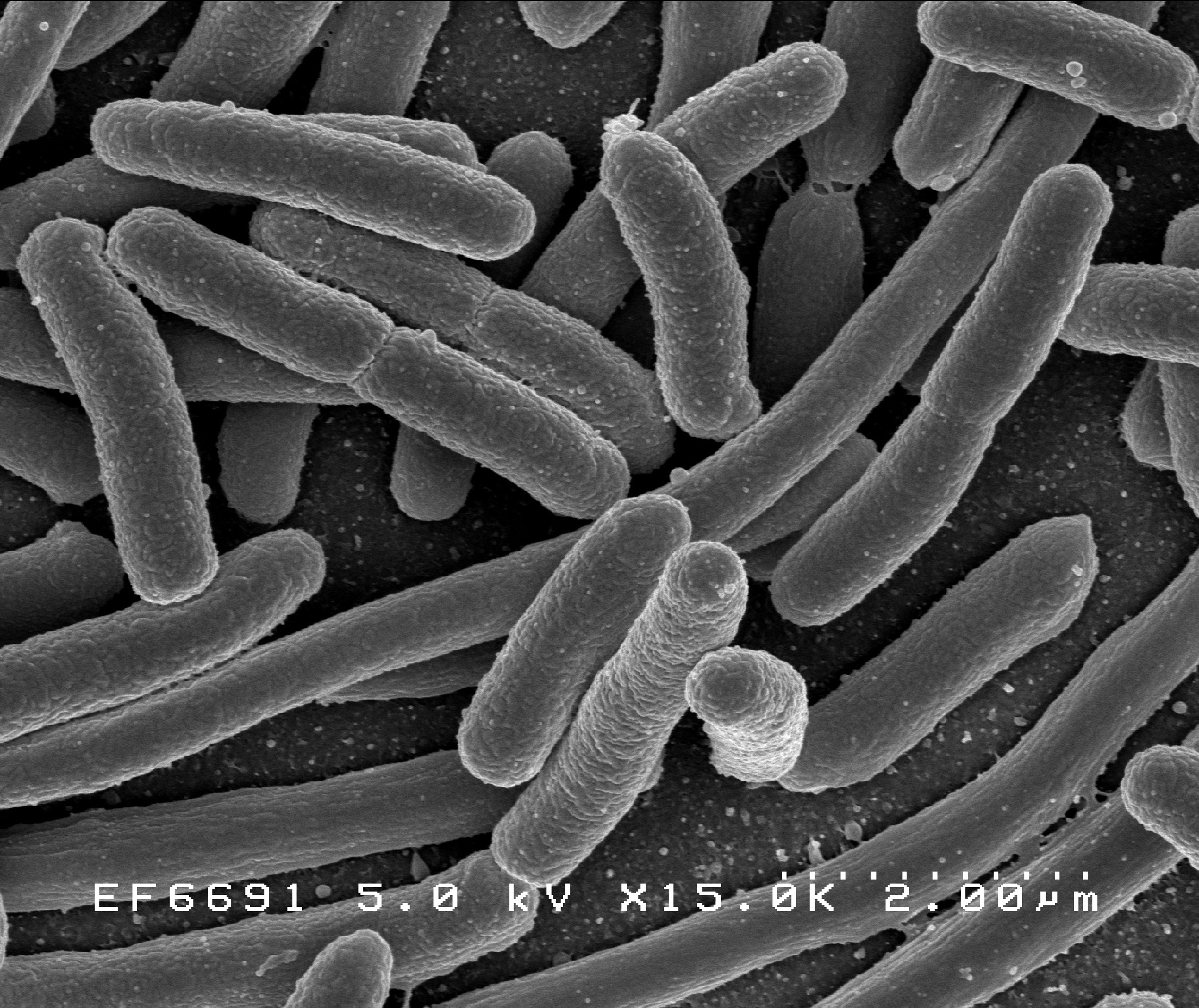
Escherichia coli is a neutrophilic organism.

A neutrophile is a neutrophilic organism that thrives in a neutral pH environment between 6.5 and 7.5.

== Environment ==
The pH of the environment can support growth or hinder neutrophilic organisms. When the pH is within the microbe's range, they grow and within that range there is an optimal growth pH. Neutrophiles are adapted to live in an environment where the hydrogen ion concentration is at equilibrium. They are sensitive to the concentration, and when the pH become too basic or acidic, the cell's proteins can denature. Depending on the microbe and the pH, the microbe's growth can be slowed or stopped altogether. Manipulation of the pH of the environment that the microbe is in is used by the food industry to control its growth in order to increase the shelf life of food.

== See also ==
- Acidophile
- Acidophobe
- Alkaliphile
- Extremophile
- Mesophile
