= Natrialbales =

Scientific classification
- Domain: Archaea
- Kingdom: Methanobacteriati
- Phylum: Methanobacteriota
- Class: Halobacteria
- Order: Natrialbales; Gupta et al. 2015

Family
- Natrialbaceae Gupta et al. 2015

Order of archaea

Natrialbales is an order of halophilic, chemoorganotrophic archaea within the class Haloarchaea. The type genus of this order is Natrialba.

The name Natrialbales is derived from the Latin term Natriabla, referring to the type genus of the order and the suffix "-ales", an ending used to denote an order. Together, Natrialbales refers to an order whose nomenclatural type is the genus Natrialba.

== Biochemical characteristics and molecular signatures ==
Members are halophilic chemoorganotrophs and are mainly isolated from high-salt environments such as saline lakes, soda lakes and salted hides. Some members are motile. Morphology is variable, including rod, coccus or pleomorphic shapes. Majority of the class are able to grow optimally in alkaline pH and do not possess gas vesicles. The DNA G+C content for this order ranges between 60 and 70 mol%.

This order can be reliably distinguished from other orders within the phylum Euryarchaeota by the presence of eight conserved signature proteins (CSPs) and two conserved signature indels (CSIs) present in the ribosomal operon protein and small GTP-binding protein.

== Historical systematics and taxonomy ==
As of 2021, Natrialbales contains one family, Natrialbaceae. Members of this order was demarcated from the class Halobacteria, previously a large phylogenetically unrelated group of species with distinct biochemical characteristics and different ecological niches. 16S rRNA based phylogenetic trees and morphological/physiological characteristics were not sufficient to clarify the evolutionary relationship above the genus level within the class Halobacteria.

In 2015, Gupta et al. proposed the division of the class Halobacteria into Halobacteriales, Haloferacales and Natrialbales based on comparative genomic analyses and the branching pattern of various phylogenetic trees constructed from several different datasets of conserved proteins and 16S rRNA sequences. Molecular markers, specifically conserved signature indels, specific to this order were also identified as evidence supporting the division independent of phylogenetic trees.

== Phylogeny ==
The currently accepted taxonomy is based on the List of Prokaryotic names with Standing in Nomenclature (LPSN) and National Center for Biotechnology Information (NCBI).

16S rRNA based LTP_07_2026

- Natrialbaceae
  - - Salinilacihabitans
    - - Saliphagus
      - - Natribaculum * (Halovarius *)
        - Natronosalvus
  - - - Natrononativus
      - - - Halovalidus
          - - Halomontanus
            - Natronoglomus
        - - Natronobiforma
          - - Natronobeatus
            - Halovivax
    - - Haloprofundus halobius Li et al. 2022
      - - Halosolutus
        - - - Halobiforma
            - - Natronobacterium
              - Natronococcus
          - - Halostagnicola
            - - - - Natrarchaeobaculum
                  - - Natronolimnohabitans
                    - - Natronolimnobius
                      - Salinadaptatus
                - Halopiger
              - - Natrarchaeobius~1
                - - - - Natrarchaeobius versutus
                      - Natrialba swarupiae
                    - - Natrarchaeobius
                      - Natrialba
                  - - Haloterrigena
                    - - Natrinema~
                      - - Natrinema~1
                        - - Natrinema
                          - - Natrinema~2
                            - - Natrinema~3
                              - Natronorubrum

53 marker proteins based GTDB 11-RS232

- Natrialbaceae
  - - Halorubellus Cui et al. 2014 *
    - Haloarchaeobius Makhdoumi-Kakhki et al. 2012 *
  - - Halovivax Castillo et al. 2006
    - - Natronobeatus Li et al. 2023
      - - Natribaculum Liu et al. 2015 *
          (inc. Halovarius Mehrshad et al. 2015 *)
        - - - - - Natronobiforma Sorokin et al. 2019
                - Saliphagus Yin et al. 2017
              - Halomontanus Mao et al. 2024 [inc.
                Natronoglomus Sorokin et al. 2025]
            - - Natrononativus Li et al. 2023
              - Natronosalvus Tan et al. 2023
          - - Salinilacihabitans Li et al. 2023
            - - Halovalidus Dong et al. 2025
              - - Halostagnicola Castillo et al. 2006
                - - Natronococcus Tindall et al. 1984
                  - - - - Halopiger_B
                        - Halosolutus Sun et al. 2022
                      - - Halopiger_A
                        - Natrarchaeobaculum Sorokin et al. 2020
                    - - - Natrarchaeobius corrig. Sorokin et al. 2020
                        - - Salinadaptatus Xue et al. 2020
                          - Natrialba Kamekura & Dyall-Smith 1996
                      - - - - Natronolimnobius Itoh et al. 2005
                            - Halopiger Gutierrez et al. 2007
                          - Natronobacterium Tindall et al. 1984 [incl. Halobiforma Hezayen et al. 2002]
                        - - - - Natronolimnohabitans Sorokin et al. 2020
                              - Haloterrigena Ventosa et al. 1999
                            - Natronorubrum Xu et al. 1999
                          - Natrinema McGenity et al. 1998

Note: * polyphyletic Halobacteriaceae

== See also ==
- List of Archaea genera
