= Picrophilus oshimae =

Scientific classification
- Domain: Archaea
- Kingdom: Methanobacteriati
- Phylum: Thermoplasmatota
- Class: Thermoplasmata
- Order: Thermoplasmatales
- Family: Picrophilaceae
- Genus: Picrophilus
- Species: P. oshimae

Binomial name
- Picrophilus oshimae Schleper et al. 1996

Type strain
- DSM 9789

Species of archaeon

== Picrophilus oshimae ==
Picrophilus oshimae is an archaeon from the genus Picrophilus that has been isolated from soil collected in Northern Japan. It is considered a thermoacidophilic extremophile capable of growing at extremely low pH values and high temperatures. P. oshimae is considered to be one of the most acid-tolerant organisms ever studied, with optimal growth near pH 0.7 and the ability to survive in conditions approaching pH 0.

== Etymology ==
The genus Picrophilus is derived from the Greek word pikros (bitter/sharp/pungent) and the word philos (friend/loving) to mean "acid loving," which reflects the genus's ability to grow in acidic environments. The species name oshimae honors Tairo Oshima, a biochemist at the Tokyo Institute of Tech who has contributed over 140 publications to biochemistry and is credited with being the first to have isolated Thermus thermophilus.

== Discovery and isolation ==
In 1995, Christa Schleper and her colleagues reported the discovery of a previously unknown archaeal species isolated from geothermal sites in northern Hokkaido, Japan. Samples were collected from extremely acidic hot springs and nearby soils in the Noboribetsu and Kawayu regions. Temperatures in these regions ranged from approximately 50-60°C, and soil pH values were extremely low.

=== Isolation ===
In the laboratory, enrichment cultures were created under oxygen-rich conditions at 60°C using yeast extract as the primary nutrient source. After incubating on acidic solid media, distinct colonies developed within several days. Various molecular analyses were performed, including comparisons of DNA restriction patterns. It demonstrated that multiple isolates represented the same novel organism. One representative strain, KAW2/2 (DMS 9789), was designated as the type strain.

== Taxonomy ==
Sequencing of the 16S rRNA gene (accession number X84901) revealed that the organism shared ancestry with Thermoplasma acidophilum, yet showed enough genetic divergence to justify placing it within a new genus and family. Using PCR technology to amplify the 16S rRNA gene, it was determined that P. torridus is P. oshimae's closest relative, with approximately 3% difference in full-length 16S rRNA gene sequences (≈97% sequence identity). Phylogenetic analyses based on conserved 16S rRNA sequences place P. oshimae within the phylum Thermoplasmatota, more specifically as a member of the order Thermoplasmatales. In 1996, the species was officially described and assigned to the newly established family Picrophilaceae.

While P. torridus and P. oshimae were originally described as separate species, more recent genome-based research has suggested that P. torridus may represent a heterotypic synonym of P. oshimae, meaning they could represent the same species.

== Morphology ==
P. oshimae cells are typically irregularly spherical and are roughly 1.0-1.5 μm in diameter. The outer S-layer of its cell wall has a tetragonal crystal system with a characteristic single 4-fold rotation axis. Tetragonal S-layers in archaea play an important role in maintaining cell shape and structural stability, particularly in extreme environments.

== Physiology and metabolism ==
Picrophilus oshimae is an obligately aerobic heterotroph and does not grow in the absence of oxygen. A comparison between cell densities of cultures grown in media containing various sugars and cultures with CO_{2} as the sole carbon source revealed elevated cell densities in media grown in the presence of organic compounds confirming P. oshimae's heterotrophic metabolism. Additionally, no growth occurred under strictly anaerobic conditions, whether CO_{2} was provided as the sole carbon source or not. The organism cannot fix carbon and relies on organic compounds, such as yeast extract, as energy and carbon sources. Despite inhabiting sulfur-rich volcanic environments, it does not gain energy through lithotrophic metabolism.

Under laboratory conditions, P. oshimae shows optimal growth at about 60°C but remains viable between 45°C and 65°C. It is also capable of growth across a broad acidic range, from approximately pH 0 to 3.5, with the highest growth occurring near pH 0.7. The underlying cytoplasmic layer of P. oshimae also explains its intolerance to non-extreme acidic environments. At pH values above 4, the cytoplasmic membrane exhibits increased leakiness to protons resulting in lysis. When grown under optimal conditions, the cells divide approximately every six hours.

Because it thrives at both high temperatures and extremely low pH, P. oshimae is considered both thermophilic and acidophilic, making it one of the most extreme acid-tolerant archaea described to date. Compared to its close relative Thermoplasma acidophilum, which can grow under facultatively anaerobic conditions, P. oshimae is strictly aerobic and cannot grow in the absence of oxygen.

== Ecology ==
Picrophilus oshimae inhabits highly acidic geothermal environments, including volcanic soils and hot springs in northern Japan. Due to the intense acidity and geothermal activity in these habitats, the conditions created are inhospitable to most organisms.

P. oshimae, however, is well adapted to these extreme conditions. Capable of surviving at extremely low pH values, P. oshimae is one of the most acid-tolerant microorganisms described. Within these environments, P. oshimae exists as a free-living microorganism and relies on organic compounds available in its surroundings to grow, consistent with its heterotrophic metabolism.

== Genomics ==
Currently, DSM 9789 is the only strain of P. oshimae to have been sequenced. Its genome consists of a single circular chromosome with a guanine-cytosine content of approximately 36 mol%, comparable to that of other members of the order Thermoplasmatales. The genome encodes proteins that help maintain cellular stability under extremely low pH conditions. Higher guanine-cytosine content typically confers to enhanced resistance to denaturation because guanine-cytosine intermolecular attraction is greater than that of adenine-thymine (3 hydrogen bonds vs 2 hydrogen bonds). With regards to genome size, P. oshimae has a relatively small genome especially among nonparasitic archaea and bacteria with a genome size of around 1.55 Mb (genome size of E. coli ranges from 4.5-5.5 Mb). Parasitic organisms have been observed to have diminished genomes, having adapted to use their host's machinery. However, P. oshimae's small genome size is a result of having high coding density - 92% of the sequences are coding In addition, P. oshimae is known to contain two plasmids, one 8.3 kb in size and the other 8.8kb in size.

== Significance ==
Picrophilus oshimae is notable for its ability to grow in extremely low pH values, being described as one of the most acid-tolerant microorganisms. Despite other organisms' inability to survive in such acidic conditions, P. oshimae is able to maintain cellular stability, allowing it to grow in environments that are typically lethal for most life forms. Consequently, it serves as an important model organism for studying the limits of life on Earth.

Furthermore, P. oshimae has become a subject of research into cellular adaptation and stability because of its ability to thrive in acidic environments. Extremely low pH environments can damage proteins, DNA, and cell membranes, yet P. oshimae maintains its functional biological systems despite these pressures. Studying these adaptations provides insight into how life can persist under extreme environmental conditions. They may also provide clues about early Earth environments, which are thought to have been more acidic and volcanically active.

In addition to its scientific relevance, P. oshimae has potential applications in biotechnology. Many industrial processes, including mining, chemical production, and waste treatment, occur under acidic conditions. The stability of proteins and enzymes from P. oshimae under such conditions makes them of interest for developing acid-tolerant biotechnological tools.

Research on extremophiles such as P. oshimae also contributes to astrobiology. Understanding how life can survive in extreme environments on Earth helps inform the search for living organisms in places beyond Earth, including environments that may exist on other planetary bodies.

== See also ==
- Picrophilus torridus
