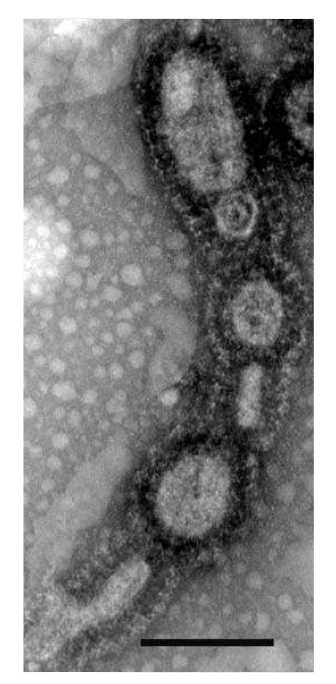
- Transmission electron micrograph of "Ca. A. boonei" vesicles from culture (scale bar, 200nm)

Scientific classification (Candidatus)
- Domain: Archaea
- Phylum: Euryarchaeota
- Class: DHVE2
- Order: incertae sedis
- Family: incertae sedis
- Genus: "Candidatus Aciduliprofundum"
- Species: "Ca. A. boonei"

Binomial name
- "Candidatus Aciduliprofundum boonei" Reysenbach et al. 2006

= Aciduliprofundum boonei =

Species of archaeon

"Candidatus Aciduliprofundum boonei" is an obligate thermoacidophilic candidate species of archaea belonging to the phylum "Euryarchaeota". Isolated from acidic hydrothermal vent environments, "Ca. A. boonei" is the first cultured representative of a biogeochemically significant clade of thermoacidophilic archaea known as the "Deep-Sea Hydrothermal Vent Euryarchaeota 2 (DHVE2)".

== Cell morphology and physiology ==
"Ca. A. boonei" is an obligate thermoacidophile capable of growing at pH 3.3-5.8, with its optimum zone being 4.2-4.8. Cultures have been shown to grow between 55 and 77 °C with best growth occurring at 70 °C with a 2.5-3.5% (w/v) NaCl optimum.

Morphologically, the archaeon has been described as a pleiomorphic coccus with a diameter of 0.6-1.0μm, that is motile via a singular, proximally sheathed flagellum. "Ca. A. boonei" cells are enveloped by a plasma membrane and a single S-layer, which is structurally comparable to that of Picrophilus oshimae. Despite the common belief that S-layers are quasi-crystalline, the S-layer of "Ca. A. boonei" demonstrates visible plasticity and is capable of bending into small, highly curved structures resembling vesicles. Budding from the cell, these spherical components can segregate small quantities of cytoplasm and travel extracellularly until they combine with neighboring cells. Other visual observations, through transmission electron microscopy, of "Ca. A. boonei" have depicted these vesicles as budding off the cell in chains. In other bacteria and archaea vesicles such as these are produced to remove misfolded proteins or toxins during periods of stress, to shuttle mRNA, cell-cell communication, and to deliver virulence factors. The biogeochemical significance of the energy demanding process of budding has yet to be identified in this species.

Further chemical analyses have shown its membrane lipids are primarily composed of glycerol dibiphytanyl glycerol tetraethers with 0-4 cyclopentane rings. This biochemical structure is likely a hallmark trait of acidophilic Thermoproteota and "Euryarchaeota", and have been detected in Ferroplasma and Thermoplasma, which are the closest cultured relatives of "Ca. A. boonei".

== Environment and ecology ==
Identification of the thermoacidophilic archaeon has been restricted to deep-sea hydrothermal vents that populate benthic environments. More specifically, "Ca. A. boonei" is found in samples collected from the horizontal flanges of chimneys that protrude from the ocean floor. It is believed that conductive cooling and diffusion of end member fluids creates the perfect microniche for optimum survival of the organism in such a harsh environment. These environments are extremely limiting as far as life is concerned, and demands unique metabolisms and behavior. Hydrothermal vents are characteristically hot, oxygen limited, toxic, and reduced, therefore limiting colonization to organisms that are capable of surviving under such harsh conditions. Consequently, organisms found in this environment are typically extremophiles such as thermophiles, acidophiles, halophiles, and barophiles/piezophiles.

The unique hydrothermal environment is rich in sulfur- and iron-based metabolites that are used by a variety of lithotrophic organisms as electron donors and acceptors. As a result, the local environment allows for a broad spectrum of metabolic processes that are dependent on thermal and chemical gradients.

== Metabolism ==
As an obligate anaerobe, "Ca. A. boonei" requires restrictive anoxic reduced niches to survive. It benefits from a continuous supply of inorganic electron acceptors such as elemental sulfur, sulfate, and ferric iron. Conditions such as these are naturally formed in the vent system by geophysical and geochemical processes that occur beneath the crust and within the benthic fluids that flood the vents.

The archaeon is shown to be an obligate heterotroph that primarily ferments peptides to harness energy. Genomic studies have revealed the presence of multiple proteolytic and peptidolytic enzymes that participate in peptide metabolism. Additionally, genome reconstruction revealed a complete but modified Embden-Meyerof-Parnas pathway that operates in the gluconeogenic direction.

As a strict chemoheterotroph, "Ca. A. boonei" requires a continuous supply of peptides to carry out its cellular processes. Culture-based studies have shown the archaeon to only grow on trypticase peptone, casein, and yeast extract. Growth on these complex organics has revealed the production of small organic acids such as formate and acetate. To obtain the necessary exogenous peptides, "Ca. A. boonei" has been shown to have a membrane embedded with peptidases and an arsenal of permeases which help degrade the extracellular components and subsequently transport them into the cell for utilization. Additionally, the cytoplasm is flooded with peptidases that continue the peptide metabolism. Genome analysis shows that the archaeon is auxotrophic for many amino acids, which is evidenced by incomplete biosynthetic pathways in its reconstructed genome. Therefore, some peptides and amino acids would be entering the cell to be used for energy, while others will be incorporated into cellular machinery.

Based on ecological studies of deep-sea hydrothermal vent systems, it is believed that the anoxic reduced environments in which "Ca. A. boonei" thrives, are shaped, in part, by the synergistic associations the organism has with other members of its hydrothermal vent community. Genomic studies have revealed that the members of the DHVE2 clade, which includes "Ca. A. boonei", co-occur (spatially) with other thermoacidophilic archaea that utilize different carbon and/or energy sources.

== Genome ==
Difficulties physically culturing "Ca. A. boonei" led to a plethora of genomic investigations to understand the organism and other members of its clade. Quantitative PCR was used to detect archaeal sequences in deep-sea vent samples globally. Analysis of the 16S rRNA gene allowed for phylogenetic reconstruction of the DHVE2 and other deep branching thermophilic archaea often found in the hydrothermal environment. Phylogenetic trees were constructed to visually demonstrate the novelty of the DHVE2 group as well as "Ca. A. boonei".

A draft genome of "Ca. A. boonei" strain T469 resulted in 31 scaffolds averaging approximately 47kbp (kilo-basepairs) in size, with a G+C% content of 39%. The reconstruction pieced together a map of genes involved in flagella formation, and show that the organism's novel organization resembles both prevailing architectures of flagellar genes in archaea; fla1 and fla2. The novel third pattern of flagellar organization is somewhat of a hybrid of fla1 and fla2 but without a few crucial components. This suggests that both reductive evolution and horizontal gene transfer may have played a role in the acquisition of the flagella genes.

== Discovery and isolation ==
The archaeon was first isolated in sulfide samples collected on diving expeditions at the Eastern Lau Spreading Center, as part of a research project directed by Anna-Louis Reysenbach in 2006. Despite prior difficulty isolating members from the DHVE2 class of archaea from these hydrothermal vent environments, it was ultimately isolated on ocean media under anaerobic and acidic conditions that prevented the growth of Thermoplasma volcanium which often outcompetes "Ca. A. boonei". The organism was later isolated in samples from the East Pacific Rise and Mid-Atlantic Ridge.

=== Etymology ===
Aciduliprofundum is derived from the acidulous (Latin), a little sour; and profundum (Latin), deep, for its acidophilic nature and benthic localization respectively. Boonei (Latin), of Boone, is in reference to David Boone who made significant contributions to the study of archaeal diversity.

== See also ==
- Archaea
- Euryarchaeota
- Hydrothermal vent
- Deep-Sea Hydrothermal Vent Euryarchaeota 2
