= Ferroplasma thermophilum =

Scientific classification
- Domain: Archaea
- Kingdom: Methanobacteriati
- Phylum: Thermoplasmatota
- Class: Thermoplasmata
- Order: Thermoplasmatales
- Family: Ferroplasmaceae
- Genus: Ferroplasma
- Species: F. thermophilum

Binomial name
- Ferroplasma thermophilum Zhou et al. 2008

Ferroplasma thermophilum is an extremely acidophilic, moderately thermophilic archaeon that plays a role in bioleaching of chalcopyrite. It is a chemomixotroph that requires both ferrous iron and an organic carbon source for growth and is capable of iron oxidation and sulfate reduction. The organism is commonly found in extreme environments such as acid mine drainage.

== Taxonomy and phylogeny ==
Ferroplasma thermophilum is an archaeon classified within the domain Archaea and is in the kingdom Methanobacteriati, phylum Thermoplasmatota, class Thermoplasmata, order Thermoplasmatales, and family Ferroplasmaceae. It belongs to the genus Ferroplasma and the species name thermophilum. Phylogenetic analysis based on 16S ribosomal DNA sequences shows that F. thermophilum is closely related to other members of the genus. Ferroplasma thermophilum shares 99% 16S rDNA sequence similarity with Ferroplasma cupricumulans BH2^T making it the closest known relative. This close relationship reflects shared ecological and physiological traits because both species are moderately thermophilic acidophiles found in bioleaching environments. Ferroplasma thermophilum shares 96% similarity with both Ferroplasma acidiphilum YT and Ferroplasma acidarmanus Fer1T, which are more mesophilic and prefer lower temperatures. Despite this high sequence similarity, DNA-DNA hybridization between F. thermophilum and F. cupricumulans is 46.3%. This is below the 70% threshold used to define species boundaries and supports its classification as separate species.

== Discovery and isolation ==
Ferroplasma thermophilum was first described by Zhou et al. in a study received in 2007 and published in 2008. The organism was isolated using a serial dilution method from a leachate solution obtained from a chalcopyrite-leaching bioreactor. Before diluting the leachate solution, it was enriched in modified 9K medium with trace elements and 0.02% yeast extract to encourage the growth of specific organisms to a detectable population size. The serial dilution allowed the researchers to separate cells and grow pure cultures. This bioreactor utilizes acidophilic microbes to extract copper from chalcopyrite ore. It had been inoculated with an acidic mine-drainage sample collected from a copper mine in Hubei province, China.

Multiple lines of evidence were used to confirm that the isolate was a new species. Microscopy revealed coccoid cells lacking flagella and cell walls, consistent with the genus Ferroplasma. 16S rRNA gene sequencing corroborated this, showing 96-99% similarity to known relatives in that genus. Although the similarity was high, it cannot distinguish species on its own. The G-C content (34.1 mol%) fell within the range of Ferroplasma species, providing more evidence for its placement in the genus Ferroplasma. The fatty acid analysis, which is a process that identifies and examines the types and proportions of fats in a sample, provided evidence of a biochemical distinction, as the profiles of F. thermophilum and F. cupricumulans, its closest relative, were noticeably different. The DNA-DNA hybridization showed only a 46.3% similarity, which is far below the 70% species threshold, confirming that F. thermophilum was a new species.

== Metabolism ==
Ferroplasma thermophilum requires both ferrous iron and an organic carbon source to grow, making it a chemomixotroph. In aerobic conditions, it can oxidize ferrous iron, and under anaerobic conditions, it reduces ferric iron and sulfate. In nature, iron exists commonly as ferric iron and ferrous iron. Among members of the genus Ferroplasma, only F. thermophilum has been reported to reduce sulfate under anaerobic conditions. For optimal growth, F. thermophilum should be grown at 45°C and pH 1, though it can grow over the range of 30 to 60°C and pH 0.2 to 2.5, with a generation time of 6.65 hours.

== Ecology ==
When combined, the metabolism and genomics of Ferroplasma thermophilum make it suited for extreme environments. It has been found in three natural environments across various provinces in China: thermal springs, acid mine drainage, and coal mine wastewater. The environments in which the microbe thrives are extremely acidic and heavy-metal-rich. This organism flourishes in high-temperature environments (30 to 60°C, with 45°C being optimal) and extremely acidic environments (pH 0.2 to 2.5, with pH 1 being optimal). Additionally, the microbe can survive in environments with high concentrations of heavy metals, including iron, silver, and lead. Several studies have shown that F. thermophilum showed a late-stage dominance pattern. According to Peng et al. and Wang et al., the microbe is rarely observed in the early stages of growth. However, over time, it becomes the most abundant microorganism because the organic materials produced by other microbes in the environment promote its growth. In communities where F. thermophilum is present, it benefits surrounding organisms. It hinders the negative effects of organic compounds on autotrophs, allowing them to grow.

== Environmental role ==
Ferroplasma thermophilum plays an important role in extreme environments, such as acid mine drainage systems. These environments often contain high concentrations of dissolved metals and can contribute to environmental pollution when mining activities allow sulfide minerals to react with oxygen and water. F. thermophilum participates in iron oxidation and bioleaching processes, which means that studying its metabolism may help improve biomining technologies that use microorganisms to extract metal from ores. Additionally, research on extremophilic archaea such as F. thermophilum helps scientists understand how life survives in harsh environments with extreme acidity and high temperatures.

== Genome characteristics ==
In addition to what is known about the metabolism, genomic studies have begun to unveil the genetic makeup of F. thermophilum. However, a complete genome sequence has not yet been published. Studies have identified various components of the microbe's genome, including functional genes. To find the G-C content of F. thermophilum, the researchers used HPLC. It was found to be 34.1 mol%. This value differs from other Ferroplasma species by less than 3 mol%, and this is within the accepted genus boundary of 10% and supports the classification within the genus. DNA-DNA hybridization with F. cupricumulans BH2^T showed 46.3% overall genetic similarity, which fell below the 70% threshold, confirming that F. thermophilum is a distinct species. In a mixed-culture bioleaching study, they monitored expression of the 4Fe-4S (four-iron four-sulfur) ferredoxin and sulfate adenylyltransferase genes, which are involved in iron oxidation and sulfur metabolism, respectively. The study found that pH levels significantly impacted gene expression.
