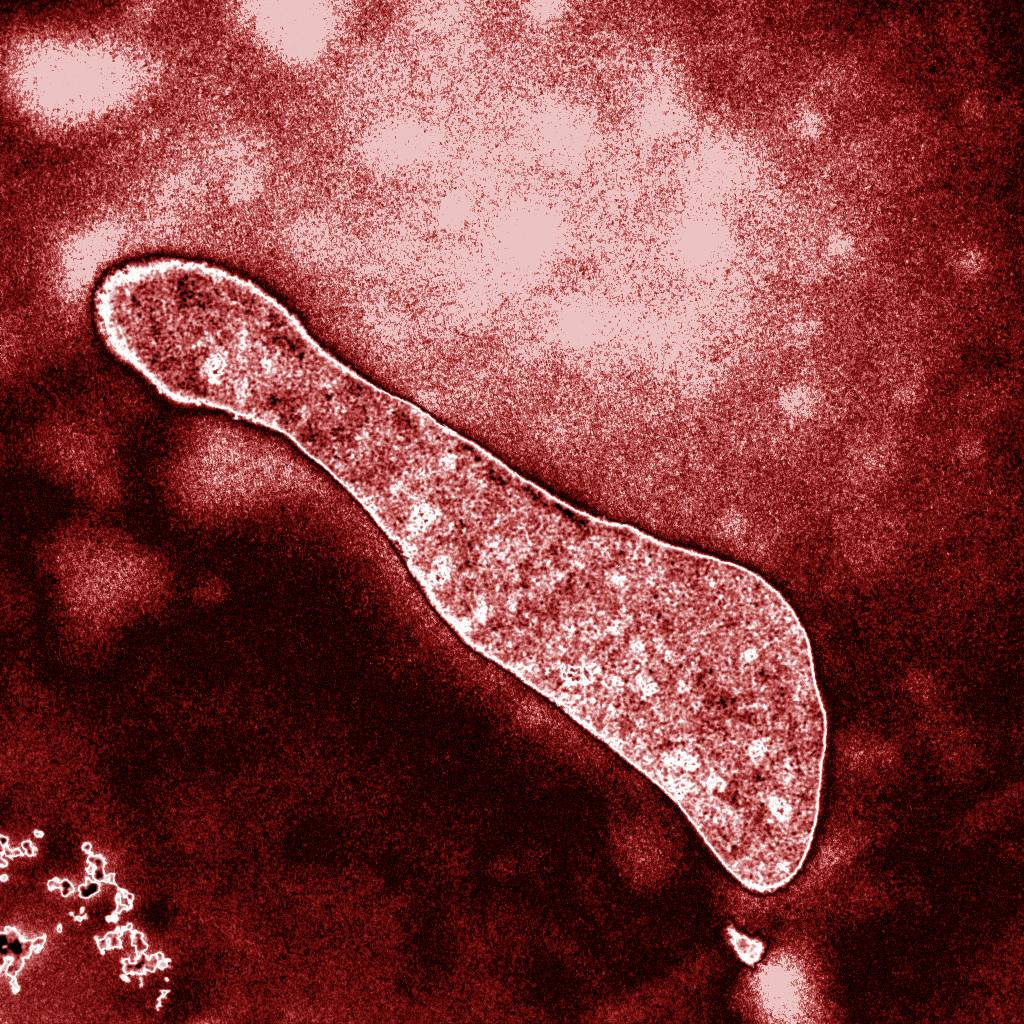
- Ferroplasma acidiphilum

Scientific classification
- Domain: Archaea
- Kingdom: Methanobacteriati
- Phylum: Thermoplasmatota
- Class: Thermoplasmata
- Order: Thermoplasmatales
- Family: Ferroplasmaceae
- Genus: Ferroplasma
- Species: F. acidiphilum

Binomial name
- Ferroplasma acidiphilum Golyshina et al. 2000

= Ferroplasma acidiphilum =

Species of archaeon

Ferroplasma acidiphilum is an acidophilic, autotrophic, ferrous iron-oxidizing, cell wall-lacking, mesophilic member of the Ferroplasmaceae. F. acidophilum is a mesophile with a temperature optimum of approximately 35 °C, growing optimally at a pH of 1.7. F. acidophilum is generally found in acidic mine tailings, primarily those containing pyrite (FeS_{2}). It is especially abundant in cases of severe acid mine drainage, where other organisms such as Acidithiobacillus and Leptospirillum lower the pH of the environment to the extent that F. acidophilum is allowed to flourish.

F. acidophilum obtains energy by oxidation of the ferrous iron in pyrite using oxygen as a terminal electron acceptor. This process produces sulfuric acid as a by-product, leading to further acidification of its environment. Its type strain is YT.
