= Picrophilus torridus =

Scientific classification
- Domain: Archaea
- Kingdom: Methanobacteriati
- Phylum: Thermoplasmatota
- Class: Thermoplasmata
- Order: Thermoplasmatales
- Family: Picrophilaceae
- Genus: Picrophilus
- Species: P. torridus

Binomial name
- Picrophilus torridus Schleper et al. 1996

Species of archaeon

Picrophilus torridus is a species of Archaea described in 1996. Picrophilus torridus was found in soil near a hot spring in Hokkaido, Japan. The pH of the soil was less than 0.5. P. torridus also has one of the smallest genomes found among organisms that are free-living and are non-parasitic and a high coding density, meaning that the majority of its genes are coding regions and provide instructions for building proteins. The current research suggests the two hostile conditions (high temperatures and low pH) favored by P. torridus have exerted selective pressure towards having a small and compact genome, which is less likely to be damaged by the harsh environment.
