= Thermoplasma volcanium =

Scientific classification
- Domain: Archaea
- Kingdom: Methanobacteriati
- Phylum: Thermoplasmatota
- Class: Thermoplasmata
- Order: Thermoplasmatales
- Family: Thermoplasmataceae
- Genus: Thermoplasma
- Species: T. volcanium

Binomial name
- Thermoplasma volcanium Segerer et al. 1988

Strains
- GSS1^{T}; A2; KD3; KD5; KD7; KO2; KS5; KS8; KS11; SL7; SLM2; YSC3

Species of archaeon

Thermoplasma volcanium is a moderate thermoacidophilic archaea isolated from acidic hydrothermal vents and solfatara fields. It contains no cell wall and is motile. It is a facultative anaerobic chemoorganoheterotroph. No previous phylogenetic classifications have been made for this organism. Thermoplasma volcanium reproduces asexually via binary fission and is nonpathogenic.

== Discovery and isolation ==
Thermoplasma volcanium was isolated from acidic hydrothermal vents off the shores of the beaches of Vulcano, Italy by Segerer et al. in 1988. Segerer et al. took 20 aerobic samples and 110 anaerobic samples from solfataric fields in Italy, Iceland, the United States, and Java, Indonesia. The collected samples from both aerobic and anaerobic environments contained multiple samples within the genus Thermoplasma, while rod-shaped eubacteria were only observed in aerobic samples. The pH at which they collected the samples was between 0.5-6.5, with the temperature ranging from 25 °C and 102 °C. Thermoplasma volcanium were cultivated at 57 °C via modified Darland medium (composed of 0.05% MgSO_{4}, 0.02% (NH_{4})_{2}SO_{4}, 0.025% CaCl_{2}*2H_{2}O, and 0.1% yeast extract) with a reduced glucose concentration. Segerer et al. established both aerobic and anaerobic conditions to grow all possible microbes taken from the solfatara fields, depending on each microbe’s particular metabolic functioning. The medium was attached to an air cooler in a glycerol shaker for microbes utilizing aerobic respiration for metabolic processing. The anaerobic media contained trace amounts of sulfur with a 4:1 ratio of nitrogen and carbon dioxide gases. Within certain anaerobic samples, isolated microbes demonstrating similar morphology to known Thermoplasma microbes were observable after anywhere from 2 days to 3 weeks of growth. Additionally, these cultures also showed growth on aerobic medium.

=== Etymology ===
Thermoplasma is derived from the Greek noun therme meaning "heat" and the Greek noun plasma, meaning "a form of something." Volcanium is taken from the Latin adjective volcanium, or "belonging to Volcanus," the Roman god of fire, who was told to have lived in Vulcano, where strains of this species were isolated.

== Characteristics ==
=== Morphology ===
The overall morphology of Thermoplasma volcanium isolates take on different shapes depending on their placement within the growth curve. During early logarithmic growth, the isolates take on forms of all shapes including, but not limited to, coccoid-, disc-, and club-shaped of around 0.2-0.5 micrometers. During stationary and late logarithmic growth phases, the isolates primarily take on a spherical (coccoid) shape and can produce buds around 0.3 micrometers in width that are thought to contain DNA. A single flagella is present on the organism, emerging from one polar end of the cell. The Thermoplasma volcanium isolates have no cell envelope or cell wall.

=== Genome ===
Kawashima et al. sequenced the total genome of Thermoplasma volcanium via fragment cloning. Thermoplasma volcanium possesses a circular genome composed of 1.58 megabase pairs (Mbp) with 1,613 total genes, 1,543 of which are protein-coding. The total GC content of the genome is 39.9%. This is a distinguishing feature between Thermoplasma volcanium and Thermoplasma acidophilum, which has a GC content about 7% larger than that of Thermoplasma volcanium. No significant correlation has been seen between optimum growth temperature (OGT) and GC content.

Genomic sequencing of several archaea has demonstrated a positive correlation between OGT and the presence of specific dinucleotide combinations of purines and pyrimidines. The DNA structure of Thermoplasma volcanium has greater flexibility than other archaeal DNA due to an increased presence of purine/pyrimidine conformations, as compared to hyperthermophilic archaea that contain a majority of purine/purine or pyrimidine/pyrimidine pairings.

=== Growth optima ===
Thermoplasma volcanium is an extremophile, as is characteristic of most archaea. Thermoplasma volcanium is a highly motile (via flagella) thermoacidophilic archaea found in hydrothermal vents, hot springs, solfatara fields, volcanoes, and other aquatic places of extreme heat, low pH, and high salinity content. The lack of a cell wall in Thermoplasma volcanium is what allows it to survive and thrive in temperatures of 33-67 °C (optimal at 60 °C) and pH of 1.0-4.0 (optimal at 2.0). To amend the lack of a cell wall, a specialized cell membrane is present within the archaea species; the cell membrane is made up of ether-linked molecules of glycerol and fatty acids.

=== Metabolism ===
Thermoplasma volcanium functions as a facultative anaerobic chemoorganoheterotroph that is also capable of lithotrophic metabolism through anaerobic sulfur respiration. Its electron donors are typically thought to be simple organic carbon compounds from cell extracts, and its electron acceptors are oxygen during aerobic respiration or elemental sulfur during anaerobic respiration. Under strict anaerobic growth conditions, the absence of sulfur markedly reduces the growth of the isolates, but some growth is still observed, due to an unknown electron acceptor. Based on its growth in medium containing yeast and glucose, it is thought that Thermoplasma volcanium also scavenges other microbes near hydrothermal vents for its carbon source.

OGT has also been shown to be correlated with the presence of individual proteins in archaea, especially those proteins mediating certain metabolic pathways. For example, in most hyperthermophiles, the protein precursors for heme denature at the higher temperatures where these microbes thrive. Therefore, this metabolic pathway will either be lost or modified to adapt to these extreme conditions. However, a majority of proteins involved in heme production were found to be intact in Thermoplasma volcanium. Similarly, most hyperthermophilic archaea utilize reverse gyrase and topoisomerase VI for modifying the superhelicity of their DNA, but Thermoplasma volcanium's genome substitutes these with gyrase and DNA topoisomerase I for the same purposes. Thus, Thermoplasma volcanium could reveal the mechanisms leading to evolutionary adaptations of archaea surviving in hotter environments.

== Relation to Thermoplasma acidophilum ==
Thermoplasma volcanium is most closely related to Thermoplasma acidophilum. Thermoplasma acidophilum was also isolated from the same acidic hydrothermal vents and solfatara fields as Thermoplasma volcanium, indicating a similar relationship between the two and their extremophile characteristics. These two members of the genus Thermoplasma are highly motile, lack a cell wall, and have homologous histone-like proteins indicative of an evolutionary divergence from eukarya. DNA homologies were significantly different between the two species, which is one source of uniqueness between Thermoplasma volcanium and Thermoplasma acidophilum.

== Research ==
=== HU Histone-like DNA-binding protein ===
As revealed by the research conducted by Kawashima et al., the genome of Thermoplasma volcanium encodes the histone-like DNA-binding protein HU, found on a segment known as huptvo. Similar genes encoding HU proteins have been discovered in numerous bacterial genomes, as it is a vital component in many bacterial DNA and metabolic functions. Thus, further investigation of this protein offers insight into the evolutionary relatedness seen between protein-DNA interactions in bacteria and archaea. Additionally, the ability of Thermoplasma volcanium to function in aerobic and anaerobic environments makes it a prime research subject on the endosymbiotic theory of the eukaryotic nuclei.

=== Potential uses in biotechnology ===
Thermoplasma volcanium exhibits extremophile characteristics through its lack of a cell wall to sustain proper functioning at high temperatures and high acidity levels. Thermoplasma volcanium’s anaerobic metabolism is capable of utilizing sulfur respiration, which can be used commercially by coal mining or petroleum industries to desulfurize coal stores. The burning of coal is one of the largest man-made contributions to sulfur dioxide in the atmosphere, which can form harmful compounds, such as sulfuric acid. Bacteria with proven desulfurization abilities (such as Thermoplasma volcanium) could be isolated and used in an attempt to identify, isolate, and clone the genes or enzymes responsible for desulfurization. To be able to harness the desulfurization process for economical and ecological use, an increase in the activity of the desulfurization pathway would be necessary. This activity enhancement could possibly occur by increasing the number present of the genes and/or increasing the amount of gene expression. It could also be possible to change the gene product yield of the desulfurization pathway to produce a better product for commercial use. If Thermoplasma volcanium’s extremophilic characteristics for desulfurization can be harnessed, then industries will be able to limit the amount of sulfur-induced environmental damage via acid rain, helping to better preserve the environment. Through this method, it may also offer insight into reversing the effects of sulfur within global warming.
