= Picrophilaceae =

Scientific classification
- Domain: Archaea
- Kingdom: Methanobacteriati
- Phylum: Thermoplasmatota
- Class: Thermoplasmata
- Order: Thermoplasmatales
- Family: Picrophilaceae; Schleper et al., 1996

Genus
- Picrophilus

Family of archaea

Picrophilaceae is a family of microbes within the order Thermoplasmatales.

== Morphology and ecology ==
The cells are round in shape, thermophilic, heterotrophic, and obligately aerobic. This species is hyperacidophilic, with an optimal pH of 0.7. Its optimal temperature is 60 °C. It has been isolated from fumaroles, acidic sediments, dry solfataric fields, and hot springs in Hokkaidō, Japan.

== Phylogeny ==
The currently accepted taxonomy is based on the List of Prokaryotic names with Standing in Nomenclature (LPSN) and National Center for Biotechnology Information (NCBI).

16S rRNA based LTP_07_2026

- Thermoplasmatales
  - - Thermoplasmataceae
      - Thermogymnomonas
      - Thermoplasma
  - - - Cuniculiplasmataceae
        - Oxyplasma
        - Cuniculiplasma
    - - Picrophilaceae
        Picrophilus
      - Ferroplasmataceae
        - Acidiplasma
        - Ferroplasma

53 marker proteins based GTDB 11-RS232

- Thermoplasmataceae
  - Thermoplasma
  - - - Cuniculiplasma
      - - Oxyplasma
        - Thermogymnomonas
    - - Picrophilus
      - - Acidiplasma
        - Ferroplasma

== See also ==
- List of Archaea genera
