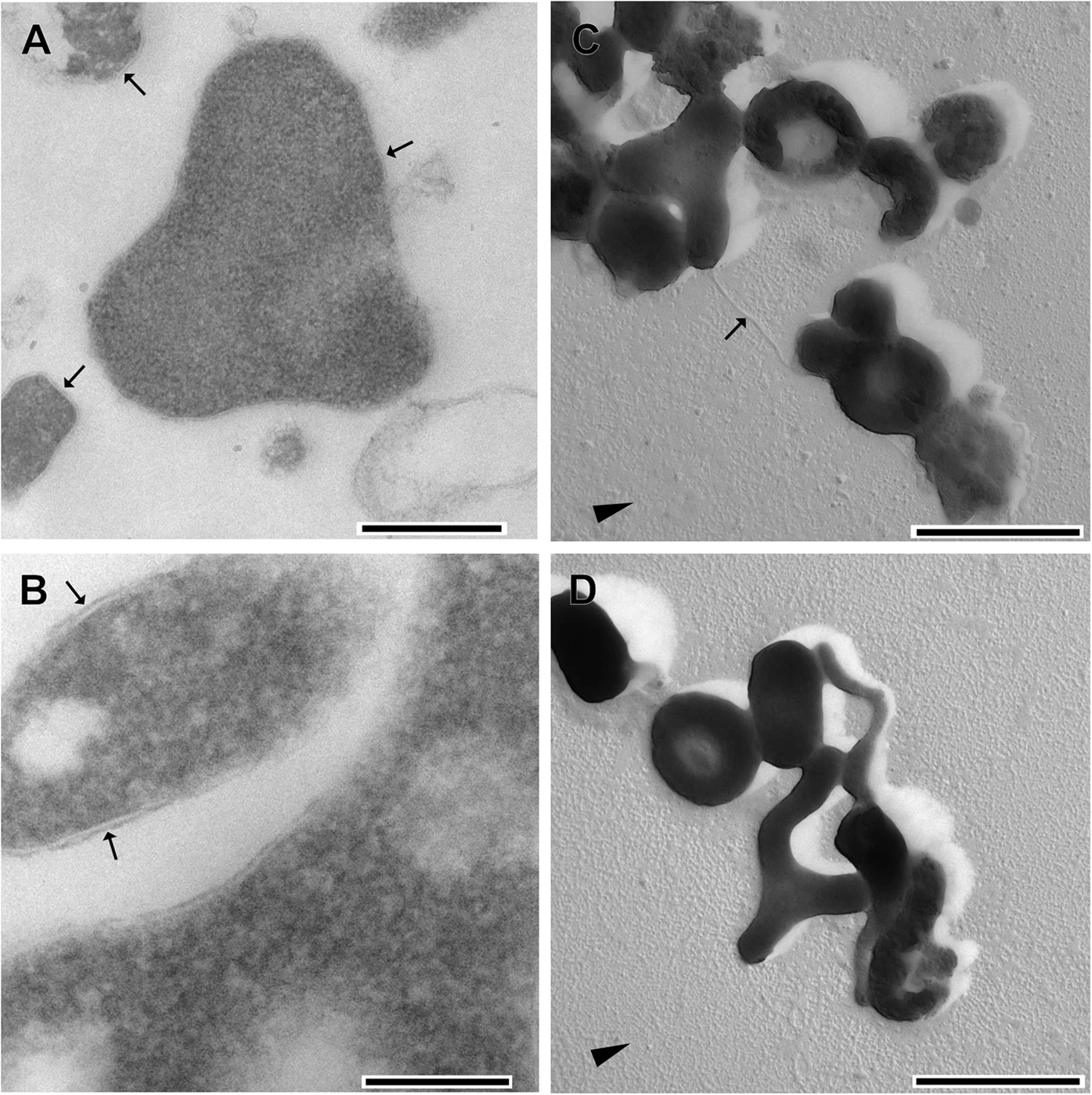
- Cuniculiplasma divulgatum

Scientific classification
- Domain: Archaea
- Kingdom: Methanobacteriati
- Phylum: Thermoplasmatota
- Class: Thermoplasmata
- Order: Thermoplasmatales
- Family: Thermoplasmataceae; Reysenbach, 2002

Genera
- "Caldiplasma"; "Ca. Carboxiplasma"; Oxyplasma; "Ca. Scheffleriplasma"; Thermoplasma

= Thermoplasmataceae =

Family of archaea

Thermoplasmataceae is a family of archaeans in the order Thermoplasmatales. It contains only one genus, Thermoplasma. All species within Thermoplasmataceae are thermoacidophiles, and they grow at a temperature of 60 °C and pH 2. They were isolated from hydrothermal vents, fumaroles and similar environments.

== Phylogeny ==
The currently accepted taxonomy is based on the List of Prokaryotic names with Standing in Nomenclature (LPSN) and National Center for Biotechnology Information (NCBI).

16S rRNA based LTP_07_2026

- Thermoplasmatales
  - - Thermoplasmataceae
      - Thermogymnomonas
      - Thermoplasma
  - - - Cuniculiplasmataceae
        - Oxyplasma
        - Cuniculiplasma
    - - Picrophilaceae
        Picrophilus
      - Ferroplasmataceae
        - Acidiplasma
        - Ferroplasma

53 marker proteins based GTDB 11-RS232

- Thermoplasmataceae
  - Thermoplasma
  - - - Cuniculiplasma
      - - Oxyplasma
        - Thermogymnomonas
    - - Picrophilus
      - - Acidiplasma
        - Ferroplasma

== See also ==
- List of Archaea genera
