= Thermoplasma acidophilum =

Scientific classification
- Domain: Archaea
- Kingdom: Methanobacteriati
- Phylum: Thermoplasmatota
- Class: Thermoplasmata
- Order: Thermoplasmatales
- Family: Thermoplasmataceae
- Genus: Thermoplasma
- Species: T. acidophilum

Binomial name
- Thermoplasma acidophilum Darland et al., 1970

Species of archaeon

Thermoplasma acidophilum is an archaeon, the type species of its genus. Unlike most organisms, its MVA pathway involves (R)-mevalonate-3-phosphate and (R)-mevalonate-3,5-bisphosphate.

T. acidophilum was originally isolated from a self-heating coal refuse pile, at pH 2 and 59 °C. It is highly flagellated and grows optimally at 56 °C (133 °F) and pH 1.8. The size of a cell is about 1 μm. T. acidophilum lacks a cell wall and the cell membrane is exposed directly outside. T. acidophilum shows various cell shapes depending upon growth conditions and stages.

The full genome of Thermoplasma acidophilum has been sequenced. It is only 1,565 kb in size.

== See also ==
- Thermoplasma volcanium
