= Streptomyces rubrisoli =

Scientific classification
- Domain: Bacteria
- Kingdom: Bacillati
- Phylum: Actinomycetota
- Class: Actinomycetia
- Order: Streptomycetales
- Family: Streptomycetaceae
- Genus: Streptomyces
- Species: S. rubrisoli

Binomial name
- Streptomyces rubrisoli Guo et al. 2015

Species of bacterium

Streptomyces rubrisoli is a neutrotolerant and acidophilic bacterium species from the genus of Streptomyces which has been isolated from red soil from Liu Jia Zhan from the Jiangxi Province in China.

== See also ==
- List of Streptomyces species
