= Sulfobacillus thermotolerans =

Scientific classification
- Domain: Bacteria
- Kingdom: Bacillati
- Phylum: Bacillota
- Class: Clostridia
- Order: Eubacteriales
- Family: "Sulfobacillaceae"
- Genus: Sulfobacillus
- Species: S. thermotolerans

Binomial name
- Sulfobacillus thermotolerans Bogdanova et al. 2006

Species of bacterium

Sulfobacillus thermotolerans is a species of thermotolerant, chemolithotrophic, Gram-positive, aerobic, endospore-forming, acidophilic bacterium with type strain Kr1^{T} (=VKM B-2339^{T} =DSM 17362^{T}). Its cells are straight to slightly curved rods, 0.8–1.2 μm in diameter and 1.5–4.5 μm in length.
