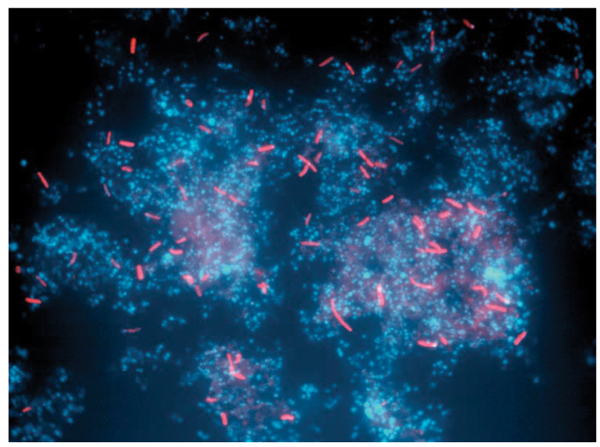
- FISH analyses of Sulfobacillus rods in a biofilm

Scientific classification
- Domain: Bacteria
- Kingdom: Bacillati
- Phylum: Bacillota
- Class: Clostridia
- Order: Eubacteriales
- Family: "Sulfobacillaceae"; Cavalier-Smith and Chao 2020
- Genus: Sulfobacillus; Golovacheva and Karavaiko 1991

Type species
- Sulfobacillus thermosulfidooxidans Golovacheva & Karavaiko 1991

Species
- Sulfobacillus acidophilus; Sulfobacillus benefaciens; Sulfobacillus harzensis; Sulfobacillus sibiricus; Sulfobacillus thermosulfidooxidans; Sulfobacillus thermotolerans

= Sulfobacillus =

Genus of bacteria

Sulfobacillus is a genus of bacteria containing six named species. Members of the genus are Gram-positive, acidophilic, spore-forming bacteria that are moderately thermophilic or thermotolerant. All species are facultative anaerobes capable of oxidizing sulfur-containing compounds; they differ in optimal growth temperature and metabolic capacity, particularly in their ability to grow on various organic carbon compounds.

== Ecology ==
Sulfobacillus species are found globally in both natural and artificial acidic environments, such as hot springs, solfatara environments, hydrothermal vents, and in various forms of acid mine drainage. Compared to other bacterial species found in similar acidic environments, Sulfobacillus species are often present at relatively low abundance.

== Genome ==
The genomes of several Sulfobacillus species have been sequenced. Differences between members include genome size and gene content related to sulfur oxidation pathways.

== Taxonomy ==
Sulfobacillus was first described in 1978, along with the type species, Sulfobacillus thermosulfidooxidans. Five additional species have since been described, in at least one case discovered after samples believed to be S. thermosulfidooxidans showed unexpected characteristics.

== Phylogeny ==
16S rRNA based LTP_10_2024

- Sulfobacillus
  - - S. acidophilus Norris et al. 1996
    - S. harzensis Zhang et al. 2021
  - - S. thermotolerans Bogdanova et al. 2006
    - - S. thermosulfidooxidans Golovacheva & Karavaiko 1991
      - - S. benefaciens Johnson et al. 2009
        - S. sibiricus Melamud et al. 2006

120 marker proteins based GTDB 10-RS226

- Sulfobacillus
  - - S. acidophilus
    - S. harzensis
  - - S. thermotolerans
    - - S. benefaciens
      - S. thermosulfidooxidans
