= Sulfobacillus acidophilus =

Scientific classification
- Domain: Bacteria
- Kingdom: Bacillati
- Phylum: Bacillota
- Class: Clostridia
- Order: Eubacteriales
- Family: "Sulfobacillaceae"
- Genus: Sulfobacillus
- Species: S. acidophilus

Binomial name
- Sulfobacillus acidophilus Norris et al. 1996

Species of bacterium

Sulfobacillus acidophilus is a species of moderately thermophilic mineral-sulphide-oxidizing bacteria. It is Gram-positive, acidophilic and ferrous-iron-oxidising as well.
