= Streptomyces yanglinensis =

Scientific classification
- Domain: Bacteria
- Kingdom: Bacillati
- Phylum: Actinomycetota
- Class: Actinomycetes
- Order: Streptomycetales
- Family: Streptomycetaceae
- Genus: Streptomyces
- Species: S. yanglinensis

Binomial name
- Streptomyces yanglinensis Xu et al. 2006

Type strain
- 1307, CGMCC 4.2023, CIP 109248, JCM 13275, NBRC 102071

Species of bacterium

Streptomyces yanglinensis is an acidophilic bacterium species from the genus of Streptomyces which has been isolated from soil from a pine forest in Yanglin in the Yunnan province in China.

== See also ==
- List of Streptomyces species
