= Aciduliprofundum =

Scientific classification (Candidatus)
- Domain: Archaea
- Phylum: Euryarchaeota
- Class: Thermoplasmata
- Order: "Aciduliprofundales"'
- Family: "Aciduliprofundaceae"
- Genus: "Ca. Aciduliprofundum" Reysenbach et al. 2006

Type species
- "Ca. Aciduliprofundum boonei" Reysenbach et al. 2006

Species
- "Ca. A. boonei"

Synonyms
- DHVE2

Genus of archaea

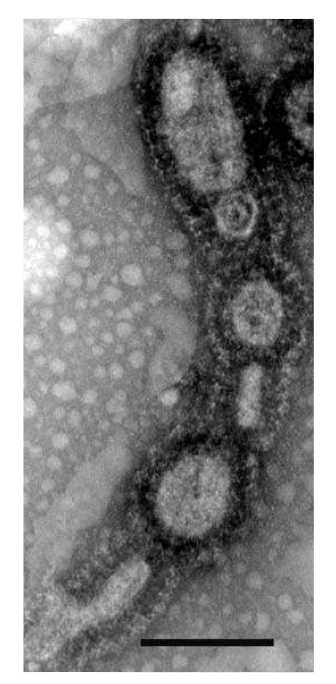
Ca. Aciduliprofundum boonei

Candidatus Aciduliprofundum is a genus of the Euryarchaeota.

Ca. A. boonei, is an extremophile, a thermoacidophilic archaeon that lives in oceanic deep-sea hydrothermal vents, that has been shown to produce antibiotics against common pathogenic bacteria. It is one of a group of euryarchaeotes classed as DHVE2 – Deep-Sea Hydrothermal Vent Euryarchaeota 2, and the only one to be isolated. It is extremely widespread and yet has not been able to be cultivated. For this reason it may sometimes have the taxonomic addition of Candidatus to its name - meaning a candidate for, until proven.

== See also ==
- List of Archaea genera
