= Picrophilus =

Scientific classification
- Domain: Archaea
- Kingdom: Methanobacteriati
- Phylum: Thermoplasmatota
- Class: Thermoplasmata
- Order: Thermoplasmatales
- Family: Picrophilaceae
- Genus: Picrophilus; Schleper et al. 1996

Type species
- Picrophilus oshimae Schleper et al. 1996

Species
- P. oshimae; P. torridus

Genus of archaea

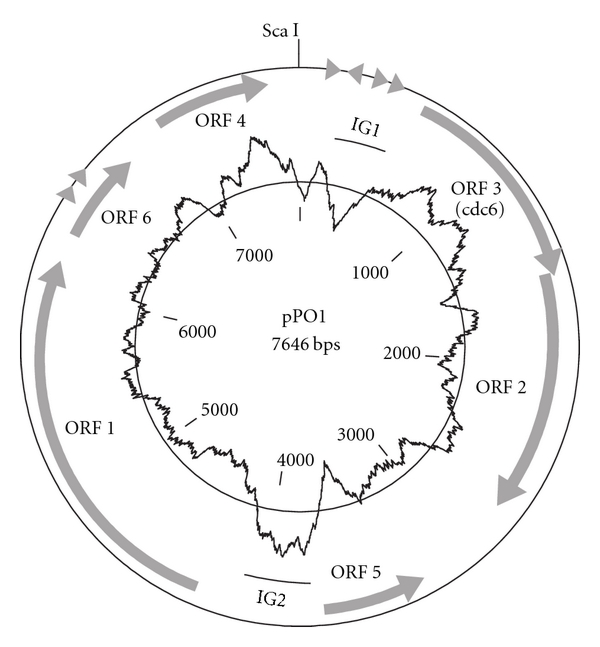
Schematic map of the pPO1 plasmid from the hyperacidophile Picrophilus oshimae

Picrophilus is a genus of archaeans in the family Picrophilaceae.

Picrophilus is an extremely acidophilic genus within Euryarchaeota. These microbes are the most acidophilic organisms currently known, with the ability to grow at a pH of less than 0.5. They were first isolated from samples taken from acidic hot springs and dry hot soil in Hokkaido (Japan). They are obligate acidophiles and are unable to maintain their membrane integrity at pH values above 4. While phylogenetically related to other organisms within Thermoplasmata, unlike Thermoplasma and Ferroplasma, Picrophilus contains an S-layer cell wall.

== Phylogeny ==
The currently accepted taxonomy is based on the List of Prokaryotic names with Standing in Nomenclature (LPSN) and National Center for Biotechnology Information (NCBI).

16S rRNA based LTP_07_2026

- Picrophilus
  - P. oshimae Schleper et al. 1996
  - P. torridus Zillig et al. 1996

53 marker proteins based GTDB 11-RS232

- Picrophilus
  - P. oshimae [incl. P. torridus]

== See also ==
- List of Archaea genera
