= Acidulidesulfobacteriota =

Acidulidesulfobacteriota is a recently proposed bacterial phylum that was formerly considered an order within the Deltaproteobacteria lineage, specifically known as Candidatus acidulodesulfobacterales. It represents a monophyletic group of bacteria found mainly in sulfur-rich environments such as acid mine drainage sites and marine hydrothermal sulfides.

== Ecological and evolutionary role ==
Acidulidesulfobacteriota are ecologically significant in biogeochemical cycling, especially with respect to sulfur and iron. Their genomes show evidence of interaction with viruses, which can influence host metabolic functions including folate biosynthesis and sulfur pathways.
