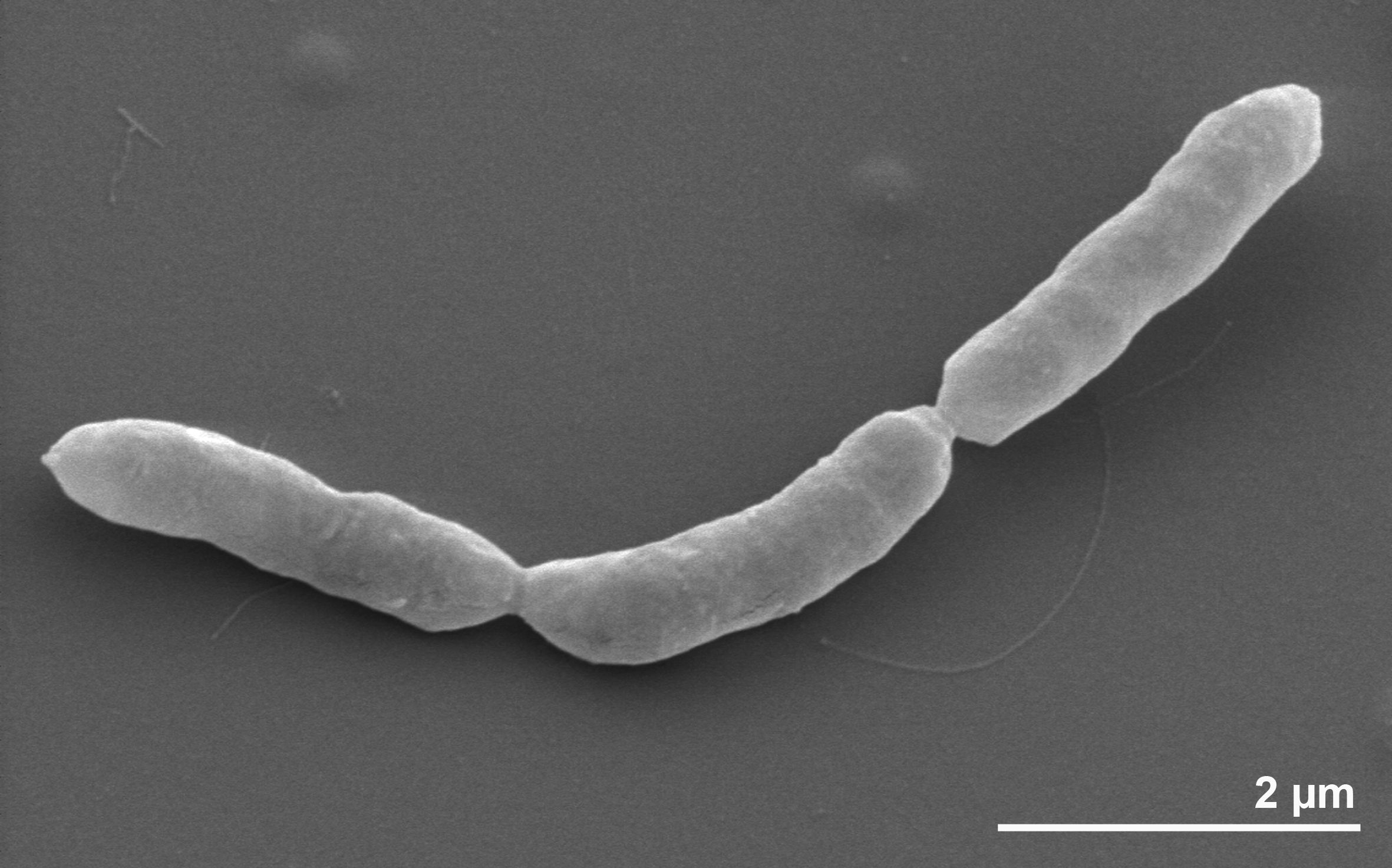
- Image of Sulfobacillus thermosulfidooxidans

Scientific classification
- Domain: Bacteria
- Kingdom: Bacillati
- Phylum: Bacillota
- Class: Clostridia
- Order: Eubacteriales
- Family: "Sulfobacillaceae"
- Genus: Sulfobacillus
- Species: S. thermosulfidooxidans

Binomial name
- Sulfobacillus thermosulfidooxidans Golovacheva and Karavaiko 1991

= Sulfobacillus thermosulfidooxidans =

Species of bacterium

Sulfobacillus thermosulfidooxidans is a species of bacteria of the genus Sulfobacillus. It is an acidophilic, mixotrophic, moderately thermophilic, Gram-positive, sporulating facultative anaerobe. As its name suggests, it is capable of oxidizing sulfur.

== Taxonomy ==
Sulfobacillus thermosulfidooxidans, as well as the genus Sulfobacillus, were first described in 1978 based on isolates from Kazakhstan. S. thermosulfidooxidans is the type species of the genus. The genus is of uncertain taxonomic position, likely related to the genus Thermaerobacter and possibly representing either a deep branch of the Bacillota or a separate phylum.

== Distribution and ecology ==
Sulfobacillus thermosulfidooxidans is widely distributed in both natural and artificial acidic environments, including hot springs and acid mine drainage. Strains have been isolated from a variety of locations including China, Chile, Kazakhstan, California, and Zambia. Compared to other bacteria often found in similar environments, Sulfobacillus species are typically present at relatively low abundance.

== Growth and metabolism ==
Sulfobacillus thermosulfidooxidans is acidophilic and moderately thermophilic; while different strains have slightly different pH and temperature growth optima, all prefer environments around pH 2.0 with optimal growth temperatures ranging from 45C to 55C. S. thermosulfidooxidans is iron- and sulfur-oxidizing, capable of oxidation of elemental sulfur, tetrathionate, and sulfides.

== Genome ==
The genomes of several S. thermosulfidooxidans strains have been sequenced, demonstrating a genome size of 3.2-3.9 megabases, with a GC content of 48-49% and a number of bioinformatically defined protein-coding genes ranging from a low of about 3200 to a high of about 3900. All of the sequenced genomes contain large numbers of genes associated with sulfur oxidation; for example, genes encoding sulfur oxygenase reductase (SOR) and heterodisulfide reductase-like enzymes. The genetic basis of the species' iron oxidation capacity is less clear but likely involves a sulfocyanin protein. The genome also contains large numbers of transport proteins, including those specialized for metal ion efflux, and several CRISPR/Cas systems. There is evidence of horizontal gene transfer as a significant contributor to S. thermosulfidooxidans evolution, including an unexpected relationship between a SOR gene and similar genes found only in archaea.
