= Acidiplasma =

Scientific classification
- Domain: Archaea
- Kingdom: Methanobacteriati
- Phylum: Thermoplasmatota
- Class: Thermoplasmata
- Order: Thermoplasmatales
- Family: Ferroplasmaceae
- Genus: Acidiplasma; Golyshina et al. 2009

Type species
- Acidiplasma aeolica Golyshina et al. 2009

Species
- A. aeolica; A. cupricumulans

Genus of archaea

Acidiplasma is a genus in the phylum Euryarchaeota (Archaea).

== Etymology ==
The name Acidiplasma derives from:
Neo-Latin neuter gender n acidum, an acid; Greek neuter gender noun plasma (πλάσμα), something shaped or moulded; Neo-Latin neuter gender noun Acidiplasma, an acid-living form.

== Species ==
The genus contains 2 species (including basonyms and synonyms), namely

- A. aeolica Golyshina et al. 2009 (Type species of the genus) (Latin neuter gender adjective aeolicum, from the Aeolian archipelago, to which Vulcano Island belongs, where the type strain was isolated.)
- A. cupricumulans (Hawkes et al. 2008) Golyshina et al. 2009 (Latin noun cuprum, copper; Latin participle adjective cumulans, heaping up, accumulating; Neo-Latin participle adjective cupricumulans, copper-accumulating.)

== Phylogeny ==
The currently accepted taxonomy is based on the List of Prokaryotic names with Standing in Nomenclature (LPSN) and National Center for Biotechnology Information (NCBI).

16S rRNA based LTP_07_2026

- Acidiplasma
  - A. aeolicum Golyshina et al. 2009
  - A. cupricumulans (Hawkes et al. 2008) Golyshina et al. 2009

53 marker proteins based GTDB 11-RS232

- Acidiplasma
  - A. aeolicum [incl. A. cupricumulans]

== See also ==
- List of Archaea genera
- Bacterial taxonomy
- Microbiology
