= Deep-Sea Hydrothermal Vent Euryarchaeota 2 =

Scientific classification
- Domain: Archaea
- Phylum: Euryarchaeota
- (unranked): DHVE2

Genus
- Ca. Aciduliprofundum

Deep-Sea Hydrothermal Vent Euryarchaeota 2 (DHVE2) is a lineage of Archaea ubiquitous in hydrothermal vent systems. Members of this clade are widespread in deep-sea hydrothermal environments are believed to be crucial components of microbial communities and hydrothermal ecosystems. Culture independent laboratory techniques have revealed that this group accounts for up to 15% of all archaeal sequences in 16S rRNA gene analyses.

Organisms belonging to the DHVE2 have been shown to be thermoacidophilic, capable of surviving high temperatures in additional to acidic (low pH) conditions.

The acidic habitats that allow these archaea to flourish are generated, in part, by geothermal, geophysical, and geochemical processes that occur at the ocean floor near the opening of the deep-sea ridges.

Cultivation of these organisms is difficult and only 12 axenic strains have been isolated from 6 vent fields. Similarly, replicating the environmental conditions of the hydrothermal vent systems is difficult to do in laboratory settings and often results in more fastidious deep-sea organisms outcompeting the DHVE2. To date the only cultured representative of the DHVE2 group is Aciduliprofundum boonei which is described as an obligate thermoacidophilic heterotroph capable of fermenting peptides for energy and carbon. A. boonei has a unique S-layer which is more flexible and allows it to generate vesicles that bud off the cells. Further, this particular archaeon reveals unique genomic arrangement of its flagellar genes suggesting horizontal gene transfer or reductive evolution of its flagella production pathway.
