= Leptospirillum ferriphilum =

Scientific classification
- Domain: Bacteria
- Kingdom: Pseudomonadati
- Phylum: Nitrospirota
- Class: Nitrospira
- Order: Nitrospirales
- Family: Nitrospiraceae
- Genus: Leptospirillum
- Species: L. ferriphilum

Binomial name
- Leptospirillum ferriphilum Coram & Rawlings, 2002

Species of bacterium

Leptospirillum ferriphilum is an iron-oxidising bacterium able to exist in environments of high acidity, high iron concentrations, and moderate to moderately high temperatures. It is one of the species responsible for the generation of acid mine drainage and the principal microbe used in industrial biohydrometallurgy processes to extract metals.

== Cell morphology ==
L. ferriphilum is a gram-negative, spiral-shaped bacterium. L. ferriphilum is an acidophile and a thermotolerant bacteria, allowing it to survive in extremely acidic environments and relatively high temperatures. This bacterium is an aerobic organism; it can only survive and grow in an oxygenated environment.

== Phylogeny ==
Leptospirillum ferriphilum is from the domain bacteria, genus Leptosprillium, and species L. ferriphilum. With analysis of the 16S rRNA gene, it was shown the G + C content is 58.5%, which closely resembles group II Leptospirilla; Group II Leptosprilla contains two rrn gene copies.

== Metabolic processes ==
Leptospirillum ferriphilum is one of the most prevalent iron oxidizers. This bacterium also fixes carbon dioxide through the reductive tricarboxylic acid (TCA) cycle. L. ferriphilum fixes nitrogen through ammonium assimilation, has pH homeostasis mechanisms, has metal resistance systems, and has oxidative stress management systems.

== Taxonomy ==
L. ferriphilum is one of four known species in the Leptospirillum genus. It has been identified as the primary organism active in the generation of acid mine drainage, although the species Acidithiobacillus ferrooxidans was originally described as the dominant biological catalyst for iron oxidation; L. ferriphilum and A. ferrooxidans are typically found in a 2:1 ratio. The high temperature, low pH, and high ferrous iron concentration conditions associated with acidic leaching microenvironments favor L. ferriphilum.

== Ecology ==
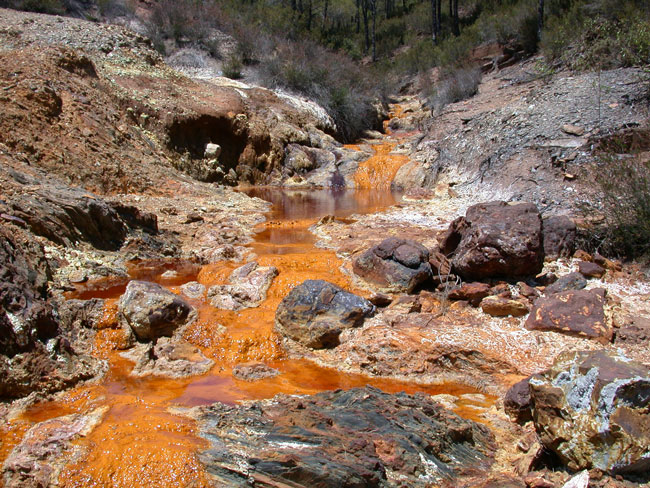
The Rio Tinto river in Spain is impacted by acid mine drainage.

L. ferriphilum is a chemolithoautotrophic and obligately anaerobic bacterium that exclusively oxidizes ferrous iron for energy. Certain subtypes are classified as moderately thermophilic. In addition, this species has the ability to fix carbon dioxide, and some strains are capable of fixing nitrogen. Transcriptomics and proteomics show that L. ferriphilum utilizes the tricarboxylic acid cycle to fix carbon dioxide. The microbe is also acidophilic and employs proton pumps within its membranes to maintain its internal pH. Found in highly acidic, metal-rich environments such as the Rio Tinto river in southwest Spain, it contributes to the water's extremely low pH and reddish-orange color. Due to its role in producing acid mine drainage, a major pollutant, it is linked to the acidification and degradation of some riverine and marine environments.

== Biomining ==
L. ferriphilum is central to commercial biomining processes, where the bacteria form biofilms on ore surfaces and catalyze their dissolution via the oxidation of ferrous iron. In bio-oxidation, it is typically used to separate out gold from ores. In bioleaching, it aids the separation of copper from chalcopyrite. Adhesion rates are higher with pyrite than chalcopyrite. Biofilm formation in these oxidation processes is optimal between 30°C to 37°C according to one study and at 41°C in another study. An optimal pH of 1.4 to 1.8 has been correlated with its highest adhesion rate to sulfide metals.
