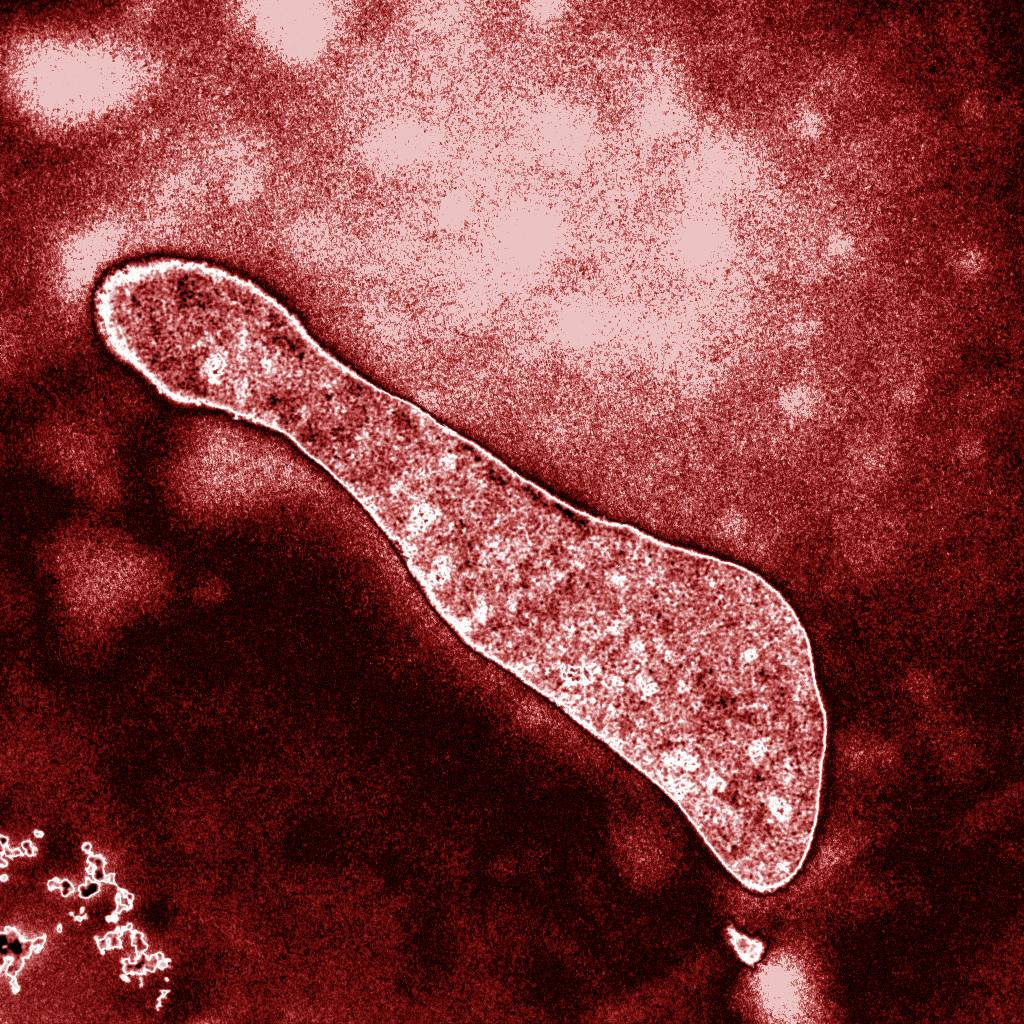
- Ferroplasma acidiphilum

Scientific classification
- Domain: Archaea
- Kingdom: Methanobacteriati
- Phylum: Thermoplasmatota
- Class: Thermoplasmata
- Order: Thermoplasmatales
- Family: Ferroplasmaceae
- Genus: Ferroplasma; Golyshina et al. 2000

Type species
- Ferroplasma acidiphila Golyshina et al. 2000

Species
- "F. acidarmana"; F. acidiphila; "F. thermophilum"

= Ferroplasma =

Genus of archaea

Ferroplasma is a genus of Archaea that belong to the family Ferroplasmaceae. Members of the Ferroplasma are typically acidophilic, pleomorphic, irregularly shaped cocci.

The archaean family Ferroplasmaceae was first described in the early 2000s. To date very few species of Ferroplasma have been isolated and characterized. Isolated species include Ferroplasma acidiphilum, Ferroplasma acidarmanus, and Ferroplasma thermophilum. A fourth isolate Ferroplasma cupricumulans was later determined to belong to a separate genus. All known Ferroplasma sp. are iron-oxidizers.

== Cell characteristics and Physiology ==
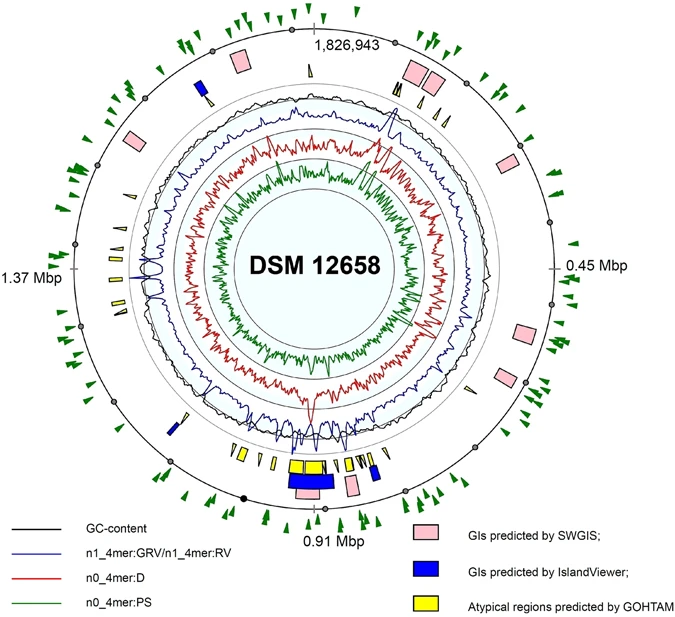
Genome map of Ferroplasma acidiphilum Y^{T} (aka DSM:12658)

CRISPR locus in F. acidiphilum Y^{T} with one operon encoding the CRISPR-associated (Cas) proteins (red arrows).

Ferroplasma cells are pleomorphic and lack a cell-wall. All known members of the genera are acidophiles that thrive in environments where pH ranges from 0.0 to 2.0. They are also mesophilic to moderately thermophilic with optimal temperatures ranging from 35 to 55 °C.

Tetraether-based lipids are an important part of the Ferroplasma cellular membrane and allow cells to maintain a pH gradient. A study of F. acidarmanus found that cytoplasmic pH was maintained ~5.6 while the environmental pH ranged from ~0-1.2. Variations in the tetraether lipids of the family Ferroplasmaceae are used for chemotaxonomic identification at the genus and species level because many members possess identical 16S rRNA sequences.

Members of the genus Ferroplasma are chemomixotrophs that can oxidize ferrous iron to acquire energy, but despite evidence of carbon fixation, lab cultures often require an organic carbon source such as yeast extract for growth. In the absence of iron, some lab-grown strains have been capable of chemoorganotrophic growth.

== Ecological importance ==
Iron is the fourth most abundant mineral in Earth's crust. As iron-oxidizers Ferroplasma sp. participate in the biogeochemistry of iron. Ferroplasma sp. are often identified at acid mine drainage (AMD) sites. When ferrous iron (Fe^{2+}) is oxidized to ferric iron (Fe^{3+}) at mine sites, Fe^{3+} spontaneously reacts with water and iron-sulfur compounds like pyrite to produce sulfate and hydrogen ions. During this reaction ferrous iron, which can be utilized by Ferroplasma, is also regenerated leading to a "propagation cycle" where pH is lowered. The reaction can be described by the following equation:

FeS_{2} + 14 Fe^{3+} + 8 H_{2}O → 15 Fe^{2+} + 2 SO^{2−}_{4} + 16 H^{+}

Ferroplasma species are often present at AMD sites where they participate in this cycle through the biotic oxidation of ferrous iron.

Ferroplasma sp. may have important applications for bioleaching metals. Microbial bioleaching occurs naturally in the highly acidic environments that are home to Ferroplasma sp. Harnessing the power of bioleaching to recover metal from low quality ores and waste material is energetically advantageous compared to smelting and purifying. It also produces fewer toxic byproducts. Studies have shown that the inclusion of Ferroplasma thermophilum along with the bacteria Acidithiobacillus caldus and Leptospirillum ferriphilum can bioaugment the leaching process of chalcopyrite and increase the rate at which copper is recovered.

== Isolated species ==
=== Ferroplasma acidiphilum ===
Ferroplasma acidiphilum has been shown to grow as a chemomixotroph and to grow synergistically with the acidophilic bacteria Leptospirillum ferriphilum. The strain Ferroplasma acidiphilum Y^{T} is a facultative anaerobe with all the required genes for arginine fermentation. Although it is unclear whether Ferroplasma acidiphilum Y^{T} uses its arginine fermentation pathway, the pathway itself is an ancient metabolism that traces back to the last universal common ancestor (LUCA) of the three domains of life.

=== Ferroplasma acidarmanus ===
Ferroplasma acidarmanus Fer1 was isolated from mine samples collected at Iron Mountain, California. Iron Mountain (CA) is a former mine that is known for its acid mine drainage (AMD) and heavy metal contamination. In addition to being acidophilic, F. acidarmanus Fer1 is highly resistant to both copper and arsenic.

=== Ferroplasma cupricumulans (formerly Ferroplasma cyprexacervatum) ===
In 2006 Ferroplasma cupricumulans was isolated from leachate solution collected from the Myanmar Ivanhoe Copper company (MICCL) mining site in Myanmar. It was noted to be the first slightly thermophilic member of the genus Ferroplasma. However, in 2009 a new genus of acidophilic, thermophilic archaea, Acidiplasma, was identified. It was proposed that, based on 16S rRNA similarity and DNA-DNA hybridization, be transferred to the genus Acidiplasma and renamed Acidiplasma cupricumulans.

=== Ferroplasma thermophilum ===
In 2008, Zhou, et al. described the isolation of the organism Ferroplasma thermophilum L1^{T} from a chalcopyrite column reactor that was inoculated with acid mine drainage (AMD) from the Daye copper mine in China's Hubei province. In aerobic conditions with low concentrations of yeast extract F. thermophilum grows by oxidizing ferrous iron. However, in anaerobic conditions F. thermophilum reduces ferric iron and sulfate. This makes F. thermophilum ecologically important for iron and sulfur cycling at pyrite-rich mine sites.

== See also ==
- List of Archaea genera
