= Christa Schleper =

German microbiologist

- Born: 1962 (age 63–64); Oberhausen, Germany
- Education: Max Planck Institute of Biochemistry
- Known for: Archaea
- Scientific career
- Workplaces: University of Vienna
- Thesis: (1993)
- Website: archaea.univie.ac.at/team/schleper/

Christa Schleper is a German microbiologist known for her work on the evolution and ecology of Archaea. Schleper is Head of the Department of Functional and Evolutionary Biology at the University of Vienna in Austria.

== Life and education ==
Having initially gone to university to study languages and economics, Schleper eventually switched to studying biology. She received a Ph.D. at the Max Planck Institute of Biochemistry in 1995 and subsequently did postdoctoral research at the Monterey Bay Aquarium Research Institute.

== Work and discoveries ==
Schleper is known for research advancing understanding of uncultivated Archaea in marine and terrestrial systems. Schleper's early research on Sulfolobus was the first research to indicate the presence of a virus in a thermophilic Archaea. Schleper went on to isolate multiple thermophilic Archaea capable of growth under acidic conditions, and led 16S RNA surveys to define the distribution of crenarchaeota in terrestrial environments. During postdoctoral research, Schleper used biochemical information from a low-temperature crenarchaeota to propose a non-thermophilic origin for these crenarchaeota, a novel idea at the time it was proposed in 1997. Schleper's more recent research has advanced understanding of ammonia-oxidizing thaumarchaeota. The research into ammonia-oxidizing archaea used the newly-isolated Nitrososphaera viennensis EN76 to provide the first description of the genes and proteins shared by terrestrial and marine ammonia-oxidizing archaea. Schleper's research on Lokiarchaeota provides a platform to examine the evolution of life from single celled organisms into complex, multicellular organisms.

Schleper has three patents granted: Isolation and cloning of DNA from uncultivated organisms, Archaeon expression system and Nucleic acids and proteins from Cenarchaeum symbiosum.

== Awards and recognition ==
- 2001 EMBO Young Investigator Award
- 2011 Elected member of the American Academy of Microbiology
- 2017 Elected full member of the Austrian Academy of Sciences
- 2022 Wittgenstein Award
