= Thermoplasma =

Scientific classification
- Domain: Archaea
- Kingdom: Methanobacteriati
- Phylum: Thermoplasmatota
- Class: Thermoplasmata
- Order: Thermoplasmatales
- Family: Thermoplasmataceae
- Genus: Thermoplasma; Darland et al. 1970

Type species
- Thermoplasma acidophilum Darland et al. 1970

Species
- T. acidophilum; "T. thiooxidans"; T. volcanium

Genus of archaea

Thermoplasma is a genus of archaeans. It belongs to the class Thermoplasmata, which thrive in acidic and high-temperature environments. Thermoplasma are facultative anaerobes and respire using sulfur and organic carbon. They do not contain a cell wall but instead contain a unique membrane composed mainly of a tetraether lipoglycan containing atypical archaeal tetraether lipid attached to a glucose- and mannose-containing oligosaccharide. This lipoglycan is presumably responsible for the acid and thermal stability of the Thermoplasma membrane.

== See also ==
- List of Archaea genera
