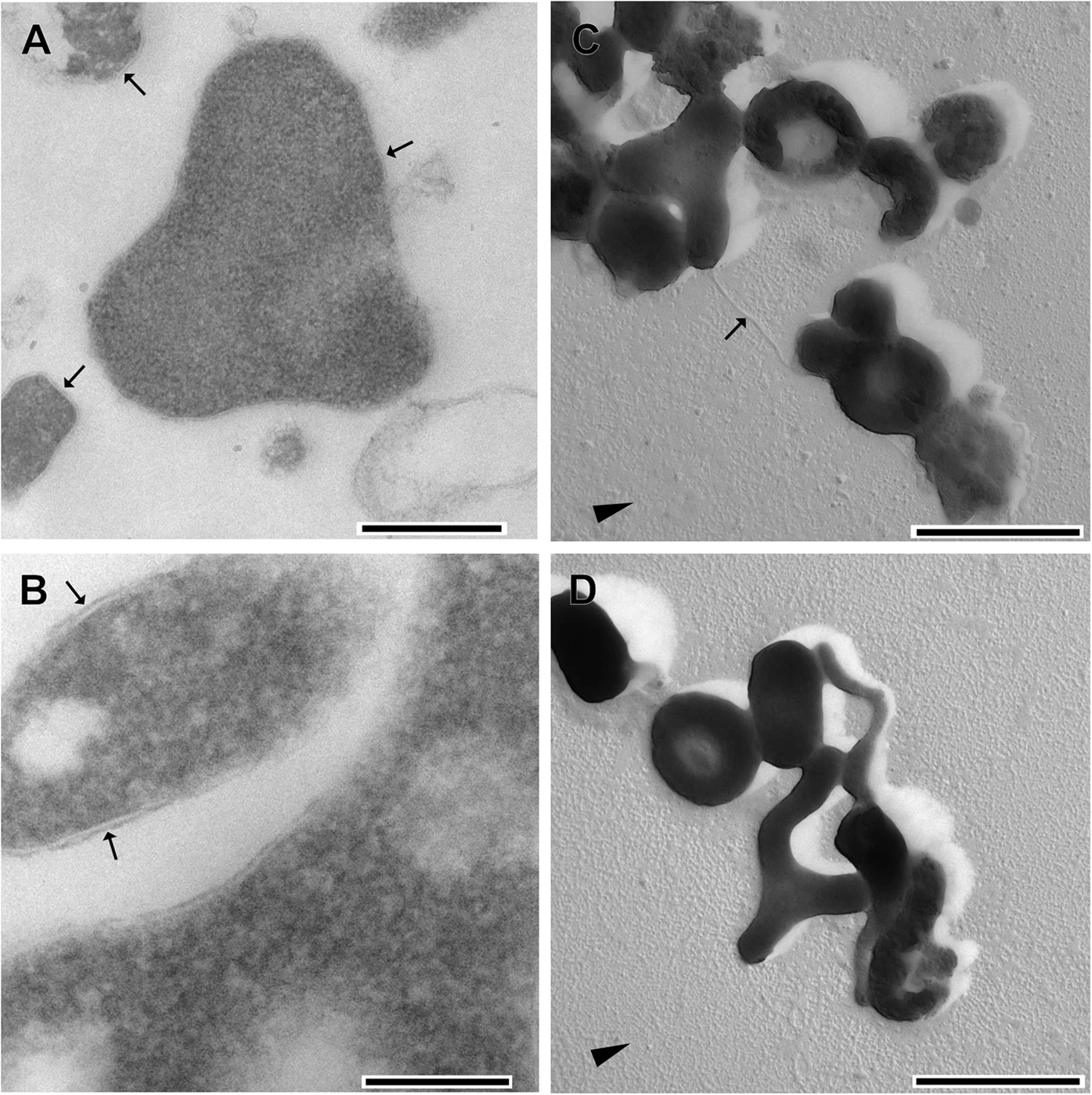
- Cuniculiplasma divulgatum

Scientific classification
- Domain: Archaea
- Kingdom: Methanobacteriati
- Phylum: Thermoplasmatota
- Class: Thermoplasmata
- Order: Thermoplasmatales; Reysenbach, 2002

Families
- Cuniculiplasmataceae; Ferroplasmataceae; Picrophilaceae; Thermoplasmataceae

Synonyms
- Picrophilales Cavalier-Smith 2002

= Thermoplasmatales =

Order of archaea

Thermoplasmatales is an order of archaeans in the class Thermoplasmata. All are acidophiles, growing optimally at pH below 2. Picrophilus is currently the most acidophilic of all known organisms, being capable of growing at a pH of -0.06. Many of these organisms do not contain a cell wall, although this is not true in the case of Picrophilus. Most members of the Thermotoplasmata are thermophilic.

== Phylogeny ==
The currently accepted taxonomy is based on the List of Prokaryotic names with Standing in Nomenclature (LPSN) and National Center for Biotechnology Information (NCBI).

16S rRNA based LTP_07_2026

- Thermoplasmatales
  - - Thermoplasmataceae
      - Thermogymnomonas
      - Thermoplasma
  - - - Cuniculiplasmataceae
        - Oxyplasma
        - Cuniculiplasma
    - - Picrophilaceae
        Picrophilus
      - Ferroplasmataceae
        - Acidiplasma
        - Ferroplasma

53 marker proteins based GTDB 11-RS232

- Thermoplasmataceae
  - Thermoplasma
  - - - Cuniculiplasma
      - - Oxyplasma
        - Thermogymnomonas
    - - Picrophilus
      - - Acidiplasma
        - Ferroplasma

== See also ==
- List of Archaea genera
