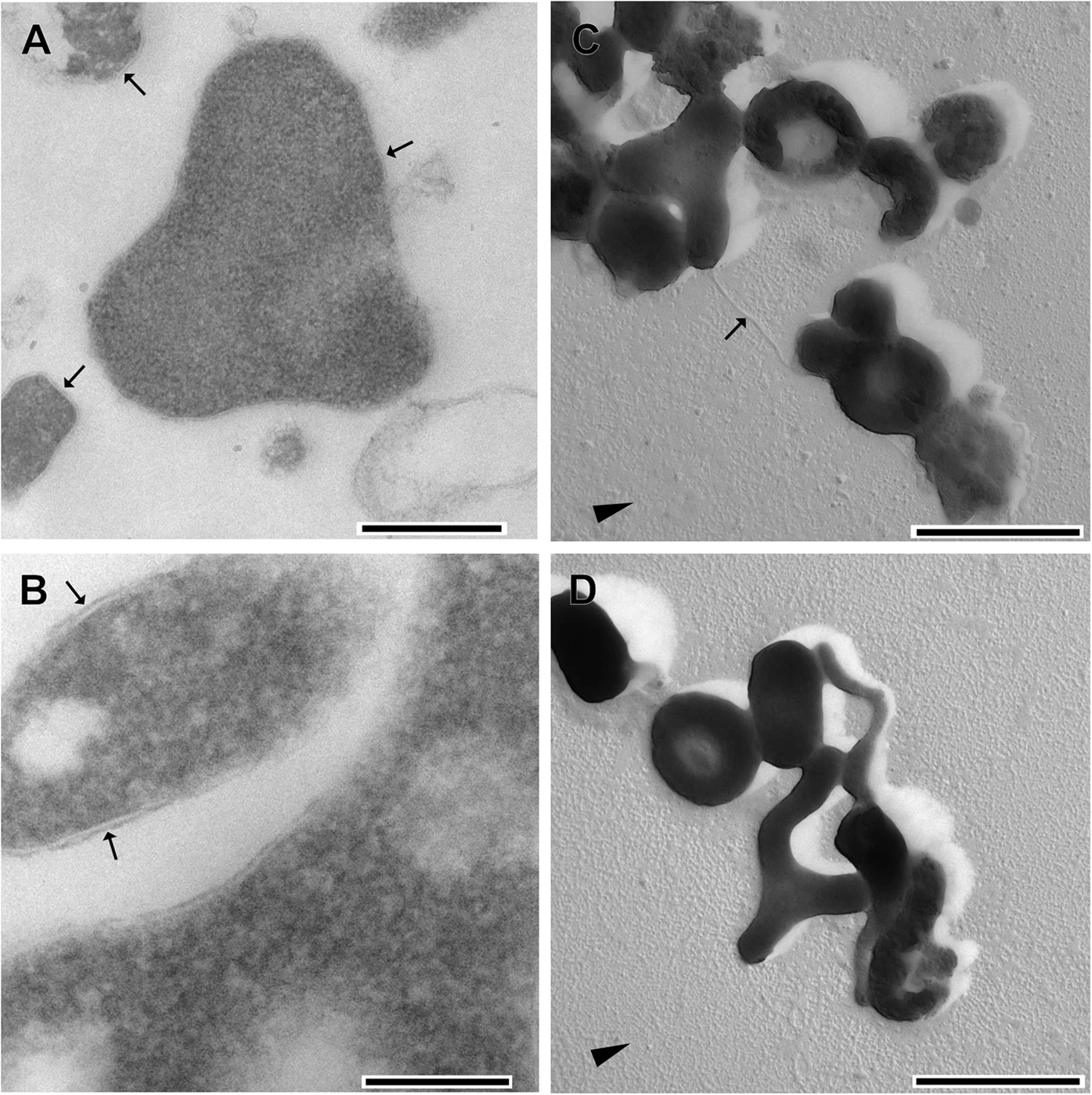
- Cuniculiplasma divulgatum

Scientific classification
- Domain: Archaea
- Kingdom: Methanobacteriati
- Phylum: Thermoplasmatota
- Class: Thermoplasmata; Reysenbach, 2002

Orders
- "Aciduliprofundales"; "Gimiplasmatales"; "Halarchaeoplasmatales"; "Lunaplasmatales"; "Lutacidiplasmatales"; Methanomassiliicoccales; "Proteinoplasmatales"; "Sysuiplasmatales"; Thermoplasmatales; "Yaplasmatales"

Synonyms
- Picrophilea Cavalier-Smith 2002; "Thermoplasmatia" Oren, Parte & Garrity 2016; "Thermoplasmia" Cavalier-Smith 2020

= Thermoplasmata =

Class of archaea

Thermoplasmata is a class of archaeans in the phylum Thermoplasmatota.

All are acidophiles, growing optimally at pH below 2. Picrophilus is currently the most acidophilic of all known organisms growing at a minimum pH of 0.06. Many of these organisms do not contain a cell wall, although this is not true in the case of Picrophilus. Most members of Thermoplasmata are thermophilic.

== Phylogeny ==
The currently accepted taxonomy is based on the List of Prokaryotic names with Standing in Nomenclature (LPSN) and National Center for Biotechnology Information (NCBI).

16S rRNA based LTP_07_2026

- - Methanomassiliicoccales
    - Methanomassiliicoccaceae
    - Methanomethylophilaceae
  - Thermoplasmatales
    - Thermoplasmataceae
    - - Cuniculiplasmataceae
      - - Picrophilaceae
        - Ferroplasmataceae

53 marker proteins based GTDB 11-RS232

- - - - "Proteinoplasmatales" [SG8-5]
      - "Yaplasmatales" [RBG-16-68-12]
    - - - "Sysuiplasmatales"
          "Sysuiplasmataceae"
      - - "Gimiplasmatales"
          "Gimiplasmataceae" (UA10834)
        - Methanomassiliicoccales
          - Methanomassiliicoccaceae
          - Methanomethylophilaceae
  - - - "Halarchaeoplasmatales"
        "Halarchaeoplasmataceae"
    - - "Lutacidiplasmatales"
        "Lutacidiplasmataceae" (UBA184: GCA_022750295)
      - Thermoplasmatales
        - "Aciduliprofundaceae"
        - Thermoplasmataceae

== See also ==
- List of Archaea genera
