= Thermoplasmatota =

Scientific classification
- Domain: Archaea
- Kingdom: Methanobacteriati
- Phylum: Thermoplasmatota; Chuvochina et al, 2024

Classes
- "Izemarchaeia"; "Penumbrarchaeia"; "Poseidoniia"; "Thermoplasmatia"

Synonyms
- "Diaforarchaea" Petitjean et al. 2015; "Poseidoniota" Rinke et al. 2019; "Thermoplasmatota" Rinke et al. 2019

Phylum of Archaea

Thermoplasmatota is a phylum of Archaea. It is among six other phyla validly published according to the Bacteriological Code. These Archaea can live in acidic environments and have also been found in the South China Sea and Mediterranean grassland soil.

== Phylogeny ==
The currently accepted taxonomy is based on the List of Prokaryotic names with Standing in Nomenclature (LPSN) and National Center for Biotechnology Information (NCBI).

16S rRNA based LTP_07_2026

- Thermoplasmatota
  "Thermoplasmatia"

53 marker proteins based GTDB 11-RS232

- Thermoplasmatota
  - "Izemarchaeia" corrig. Adam et al. 2017 (MBG-D, E2)
  - - "Poseidoniia" Rinke et al. 2019 (MGII & MGIII)
    - - "Penumbrarchaeia" Maeke et al. 2025
      - "Thermoplasmatia" Oren, Parte & Garrity 2016

== See also ==
- List of Archaea genera
