= Acidophile =

Organisms that thrive under highly acidic conditions

Acidophiles or acidophilic organisms are those that thrive under highly acidic conditions (usually at pH 5.0 or below). These organisms can be found in different branches of the tree of life, including Archaea, Bacteria, and Eukarya.

== Examples ==
A list of these organisms includes:

=== Archaea ===
- Sulfolobales, an order in the Thermoproteota branch of Archaea
- Thermoplasmatales, an order in the Euryarchaeota branch of Archaea
- ARMAN, in the Euryarchaeota branch of Archaea
- Acidianus brierleyi, A. infernus, facultatively anaerobic thermoacidophilic archaebacteria
- Halarchaeum acidiphilum, acidophilic member of the Halobacteriacaeae
- Metallosphaera sedula, thermoacidophilic

=== Bacteria ===
- Acidobacteriota, a phylum of Bacteria
- Acidithiobacillales, an order of Pseudomonadota e.g. A. ferrooxidans, A. thiooxidans
- Thiobacillus prosperus, T. acidophilus, T. organovorus, T. cuprinus
- Acetobacter aceti, a bacterium that produces acetic acid (vinegar) from the oxidation of ethanol.
- Alicyclobacillus, a genus of bacteria that can contaminate fruit juices.

=== Eukarya ===
- Mucor racemosus
- Urotricha
- Dunaliella acidophila
- Members of the algal class Cyanidiophyceae, including Cyanidioschyzon merolae

== Mechanisms of adaptation to acidic environments ==
Most acidophile organisms have evolved extremely efficient mechanisms to pump protons out of the intracellular space in order to keep the cytoplasm at or near neutral pH. Therefore, intracellular proteins do not need to develop acid stability through evolution. However, other acidophiles, such as Acetobacter aceti, have an acidified cytoplasm which forces nearly all proteins in the genome to evolve acid stability. For this reason, Acetobacter aceti has become a valuable resource for understanding the mechanisms by which proteins can attain acid stability.

Studies of proteins adapted to low pH have revealed a few general mechanisms by which proteins can achieve acid stability. In most acid stable proteins (such as pepsin and the soxF protein from Sulfolobus acidocaldarius), there is an overabundance of acidic residues which minimizes low pH destabilization induced by a buildup of positive charge. Other mechanisms include minimization of solvent accessibility of acidic residues or binding of metal cofactors. In a specialized case of acid stability, the NAPase protein from Nocardiopsis alba was shown to have relocated acid-sensitive salt bridges away from regions that play an important role in the unfolding process. In this case of kinetic acid stability, protein longevity is accomplished across a wide range of pH, both acidic and basic.

== See also ==
- Acidophiles in acid mine drainage
- Acidophobe
- Neutrophile
- Acidophile (histology)
